= Nellis Air Force Base Complex =

American military region in Southern Nevada

- Basin
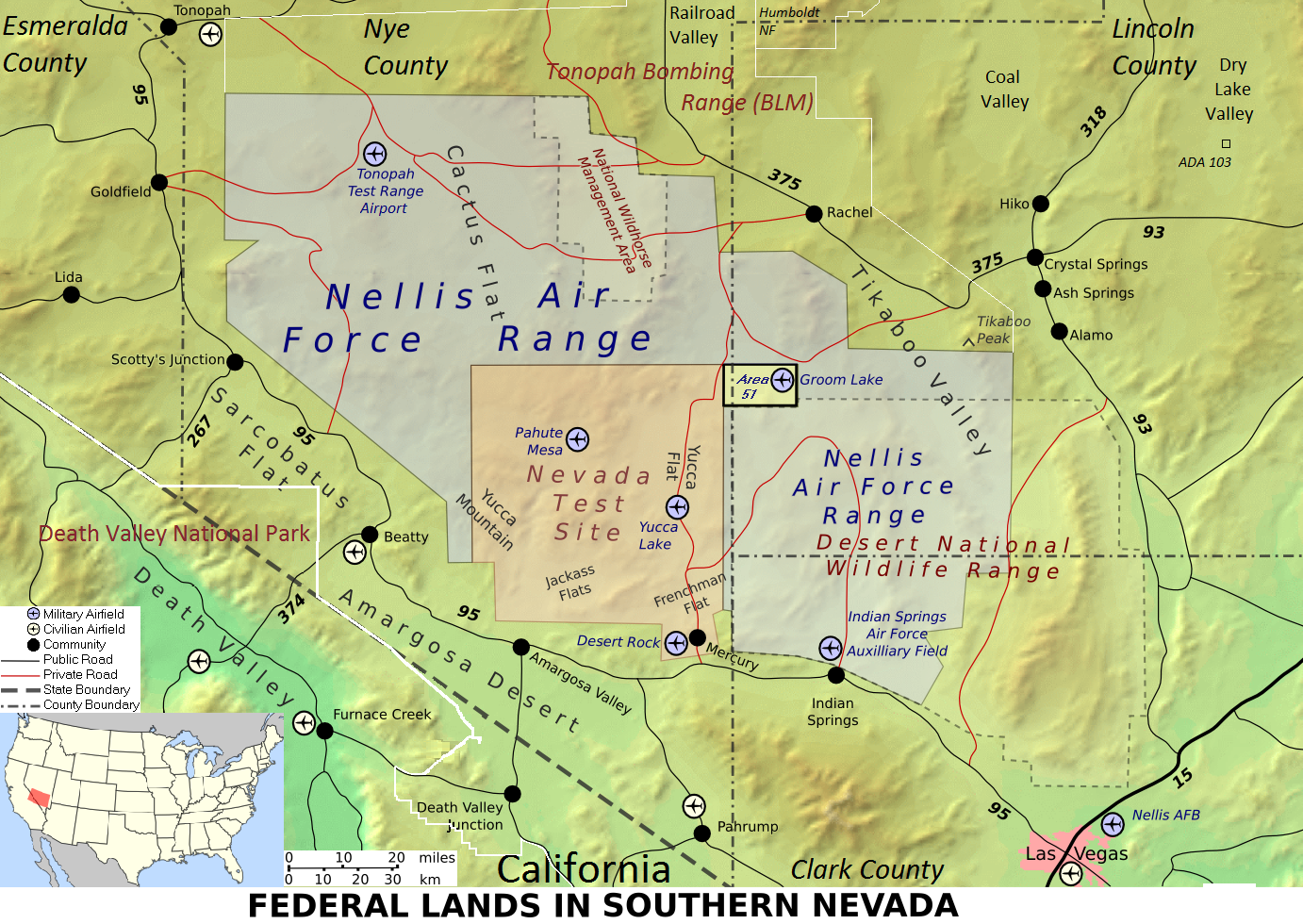
- "Nellis Air Force Range" [sic], Tonopah Bombing Range (FUDS), and other federal lands (the Tonopah Test Range/Area 52, the Red Mountain VORTAC site, and the Regional Training Complex are not demarcated).
- Location: basin between Quartzite Mountain & the Belted Range; 37°32′N 116°12′W

The Nellis Air Force Base Complex (Nellis AFB complex, NAFB Complex) is the southern Nevada military region of federal facilities and lands, e.g., currently and formerly used for military and associated testing and training such as Atomic Energy Commission atmospheric nuclear detonations of the Cold War. The largest land area of the complex is the Nevada Test and Training Range, and numerous Formerly Used Defense Sites remain federal lands of the complex. Most of the facilities are controlled by the United States Air Force and/or the Bureau of Land Management, and many of the controlling units are based at Creech and Nellis Air Force Bases (e.g., 98th SRSS for NTTR's southern range). Initiated by a 1939 military reconnaissance for a bombing range, federal acquisition began in 1940, and McCarran Field became the World War II training area's 1st of 3 Nevada World War II Army Airfields (cf. Indian Springs & Tonopah) and 10 auxiliary fields. The area's first military unit was initially headquartered in the Las Vegas Federal Building while the WWII Las Vegas Army Airfield buildings were constructed.

== Geography ==
The complex is primarily within the Great Basin physiographic section, and the White River portion east of the Great Basin Divide is in the Colorado River Watershed. Ecology is primarily Tonopah Basin surrounding elevated areas (Foothills/Uplands & High Valleys/Mid-Slope Woodland & Brushland) and 6 Tonopah Playas in Antelope Lake's valley, Cactus Flat, Groom Lake Valley, southern Railroad Valley, Sand Springs Valley, and the northwest NTTR corner. The southern part of the complex in the Mojave Desert ecoregion is mostly Creosote Bush-Dominated Basins and Arid Footslopes (Jackass Flats is in the Amargosa Desert ecoregion.) The complex includes 2 Salt Deserts—in the Coal Valley which has 3 sites of the "ADA activity area" (110E, 110F, & 110G) and in Dry Lake Valley (site 103 along the Burnt Springs Range). The highest ecoregion is in the Tonopah Bombing Range (FUDS) which includes a Central Nevada Bald Mountains ecoregion in the Kawich Range—the southern Bald Mountains are within the NTTR between the TTR & Wildhorse Management Area. The Logistic Supply Area of the ADA activity area is near the only Wetland ecoregion of the Tonopah Basin—in the Pahrangat Valley near both the Mojave ecotone and the northeast corner of the DNWR.

Traversing the complex is the mid-1800s Utah & New Mexico Territories' dividing line (37th parallel north), and the area was used for the 1900–1921 silver rush (e.g., Tonopah Mining District & Tonopah Manhattan Stage Route) The region of mining claims was grouped into numbered geographic areas (e.g., Area 2, Area 5, Area 11, Area 12, Area 25, Area 27, Area 52) which are used for current names, e.g., "Area 3 Compound" and "Groom Lake Field" ("Area 51" colloq.). The 1941-9 demarcation between the Tonopah & Las Vegas Bombing and Gunnery Ranges (Parallel 36°30′ north) is generally along the serpentine Creosote Bush ecotone between the Central Basin and Range ecoregion and "Mojavian flora".

=== Airspace ===
The Nellis managed airspace is composed of the Desert MOA, with overlying Air Traffic Control Assigned Airspace (ATCAA), Reveille North and South MOA and ATCAA, [and] Restricted Areas":

- Desert MOA: "subdivided into Sally Corridor, Elgin, Caliente, and Coyote training areas."
- Reveille Airspace: North and South MOA
- Restricted Areas (joint use airspace): R-4806 East/West, R-4809 and R-4807 A/B "subdivided as follows: Alamo A, B, & C, Areas 61, 62B & C, 63, 64A, B, C, & D, 65N, 65S, 71N, 71S, 74A, 74B, 74C, 75E, 75W, 76, 76A, Tolicha, Pahute A & B, ECE, ECW, ECS and Cactus EC."
- "R-4808N and portions of R-4808S are non-joint use restricted areas."

The former Oil Burner/Olive Branch route ("OB-10-Hawthorne") for Strategic Air Command low-level bomber flights scored by the Hawthorne Bomb Plot extended from a "point west of Elko, Nevada, running southwest to Mina, Nevada" at flight level "FL130-140" (the TTR sites for "SAC Targets 1 and 2" are at Antelope Lake.)

=== Wildlife areas ===
The Nevada Division of Wildlife's Key Pittman Wildlife Management Area has a NOAA weather station, and Wilderness Areas include the "Worthington Mountains, Weepah Springs, Big Rocks, [and] Ash Springs Wildlife Area". Lands for federal protection of natural resources include:

- Desert National Wildlife Refuge Complex
  - Desert National Wildlife Refuge: "established to preserve habitat for the desert bighorn sheep, and is managed by the USFWS as a unit of the Desert National Wildlife Refuge Complex".
  - Amargosa Pupfish Station
  - Ash Springs Public Rock Art Site: petroglyphs and semi-circular rock alignments south of Ash Springs and managed by the BLM
  - Moapa Valley National Wildlife Refuge
  - Pahranagat National Wildlife Refuge: migratory bird habitat south of Alamo along U.S. Route 93 in Nevada
- Leviathan Cave Geologic Area:. Leviathon Cave tunnels and chambers for spelunkers and geologists on the east side of the Worthington Mountain Range and administered by the BLM
- White River Narrows Archaeological District: cultural artifacts such as petroglyphs on SR-318 north of Hiko and managed by the BLM
- Railroad Valley Wildlife Management Area

Military operations "when a tortoise is found in harms way" are suspended until it has been removed by an authorized biologist (e.g., dispatched by the Nellis AFB Natural Resources Manager), nesting surveys are conducted prior to military exercises for species protected under the Migratory Bird Treaty Act, and the BLM & USFS provide protections under the Wild Free-Roaming Horse and Burro Act.

Public lands managed by the federal government in southern Nevada by size
Area FUDS #	Location (landforms, etc.)	Facilities/sites	Agency	Years	Size
Nevada Test and Training Range—shares ~1,276 sq mi (3,300 km^{2}) of the Southern Range with the DNWR	Northern Range: Southern Range: southern Tikaboo Valley, Dogbone Dry Lake in Range 62,	Northern: Tolich Peak ECR, Tonopah ECR; Southern: Point Bravo ECR, Dogbone Lake G&BR, Groom Lake Field in Area 51	USAF	1942–present	4,531 sq mi (11,740 km^{2})
Nevada National Security Site •includes Camp Desert Rock FUDS of 23,058 acres (9,331 ha) J09NV0276	Frenchman Flat, Jackass Flats, Yucca Flat, Rainer & Pahute Mesas,	10 heliports, 2 "wild horse units ... Unit 252 [&] Unit 253", Pahute Mesa Airstrip (Area 18), Desert Rock Airport (Area 20), "Yucca Lake UAV testing facility", "Yucca Mountain Underground Facility", Big Explosives Experimental Facility (Area 4), Criticality Experiments Facility (Area 6), former Base Camp Mercury	DOE	1951–present	~1,355 sq mi (3,510 km^{2})
Desert National Wildlife Refuge land east of the NTTR		FUDS: Former NAFR Areas B-G, e.g., Area F of 47,481.50 acres (19,215.08 ha)	USFWS	1936–present	1,248 sq mi (3,230 km^{2})
Tonopah Bombing Range (FUDS)* J09NV1114	Stone Cabin, Hot Creek, Railroad, Tikaboo, and Sand Springs valleys ("60 miles east of Tonopah")	USFWS National Wildlife Refuge of ~22.25 sq mi (57.6 km^{2}) at the Kawich Range, Rachel community (Sand Springs Valley), Area 51 viewing areas (Tonopah Uplands along Tikaboo Valley)	BLM	1942–19xx (FUDS: 1999)	~311,040 acres (125,870 ha)
Tonopah Rifle Range J09NV0970 Tonopah Army Airfield Practice Bombing Ranges* J09NV1112	"Sand Spring [sic]-Tikaboo Valleys"			1941-tbd	
Area A J09NV1103	north and northeast of NTTR	former ranges 46-56 "returned to public domain" by 1941 EO9019 and 1957 EO10355	BLM		~1,107 sq mi (2,870 km^{2})
Tonopah Test Range	"Cactus and Gold Flats, Kawich Valley, Goldfield Hills, and the Stonewall Mountains", Cactus Flat, Antelope Lake Valley	Tonopah Test Range Airport (Cactus Flat), Operations Control Center (Area 3), Area 10 airfield/strip, Mellan Airstrip (37°41′16″N 116°37′50″W),	DOE	1957–present	~280 sq mi (730 km^{2})
Humboldt National Forest	"Total Acreage" includes "217,086" acres not federally-owned				2,618,165 acres (1,059,534 ha)
Wildhorse Management Area	bordered on 3 sides by the NTTR Northern Range and on the north, Tonopah Bombing Range (FUDS)		BLM		
Nellis Air Force Base	Las Vegas Valley (northeast corner) adjacent to North Las Vegas	Area I: Airport, "Nellis Control", Suter Hall; Area II: former Lake Mead Base J09NV0442 Area III: Armory, family housing	USAF	1941-6, 1947–present	17.7 sq mi (46 km^{2})
Nellis Small Arms Range Complex	Las Vegas Valley & Mojave Arid Footslopes of Sheep Mountain, "north of the main base of Nellis AFB" and adjacent to "World War II Gunnery Range (FUDS)" on west and north	active area: 6,957 acres (2,815 ha) inactive (MRA MU732): 6.2 sq mi (16 km^{2})	USAF tbd	1941–present 1941-65	17.1 sq mi (44 km^{2})
Tonopah Air Force Base J09NV0969			BLM	1942–195x	7,228.23 acres (2,925.16 ha)
Creech Air Force Base	adjacent to Indian Springs, Nevada and FUDS J09NV0399 (Indian Springs AFAF land designated a FUDS by 2002)	Joint Unmanned Aerial Systems Center of Excellence; UAV-Logistic and Training Facility	USAF	1942-5, 1948–present	2,300 acres (930 ha)
Patriot "Radar/Communications activity area" ("ADA activity area"), part of eastern DNWR	Coal V (sites 110E*, F*, G), Delamar V (102, 108), Dry Lake V (103), Pahranagat V (LSA), Sand Springs V (112C, E, F, G, H, I), Six Mile Flat (109),	Logistics Support Area (LSA) at Alamo Airfield & 13 sites each 500 ft × 500 ft (150 m × 150 m) *in "wild horse Herd Management Areas (HMA)	BLM	2008–present	74.1 acres (30.0 ha)+
Las Vegas Air Force Station J09NV0445 Lathrop Wells radar site Red Mountain VORTAC site FAA radar facility (former Tonopah AFS); Former GATR & Soviet radar site	Portion is leased to Nellis AFB west of Indian Springs near Boulder City, Nevada; 38°03′06″N 117°13′32″W in Esmeralda Co. 38°08′37″N 117°11′57″W "near the former" TAFS	Former Phoenix ADS radar site Former Phoenix ADS radar site Former Phoenix ADS radar site 2 radar platforms at former Reno ADS site Former Reno ADS site	FAA; FAA; USAF	1956-69 1956-70	
Regional Training Complex (Silver Flag Alpha facility)	~15 miles south of Indian Springs on US95	12 small arms ranges, MOUT village, bare base tent city, maneuver area			
Tonopah (TPH) VORTAC	38°01′50.321″N 117°02′00.627″W near Nye County's Tonopah Airport (38°03′37″N 117°05′12″W)		FAA		
Hawthorne Bomb Plot	Babbitt, Nevada (Mineral County)	former "USAF Radar Station" for RBS	USAF; US Navy	1962–1985; 1993	
Delamar Dry Lake Test Annex J09NV0023	Delamar Valley				
Sunrise Mountain Machine Gun Range J09NV0639					
"North Las Vegas Station" near Nellis AFB "Key Pittman WMA station"	4.19 in (106 mm) average precipcipitation/year 7.94 in (202 mm) "	Climatology monitoring sites (weather stations)	NOAA	1951–present 1964–present	

== History ==
The original 1940 area named Tonopah Bombing Range was split during WWII and 1 of the 2 subdivisions was named Tonopah Bombing and Gunnery Range in 1947. In 1999 a different area was named a FUDS with the original name--"Tonopah Bombing Range" (J09NV1114)—and the different FUDS J09NV1112 was given a new name --"Tonopah Army Airfield Practice Bombing Ranges"—by 1999.
