= Nevada Test and Training Range =

Military training area in Nevada, United States

- Part of Nellis Air Force Base Complex
- Nye, Lincoln, and Clark counties, Nevada; Near Las Vegas in US
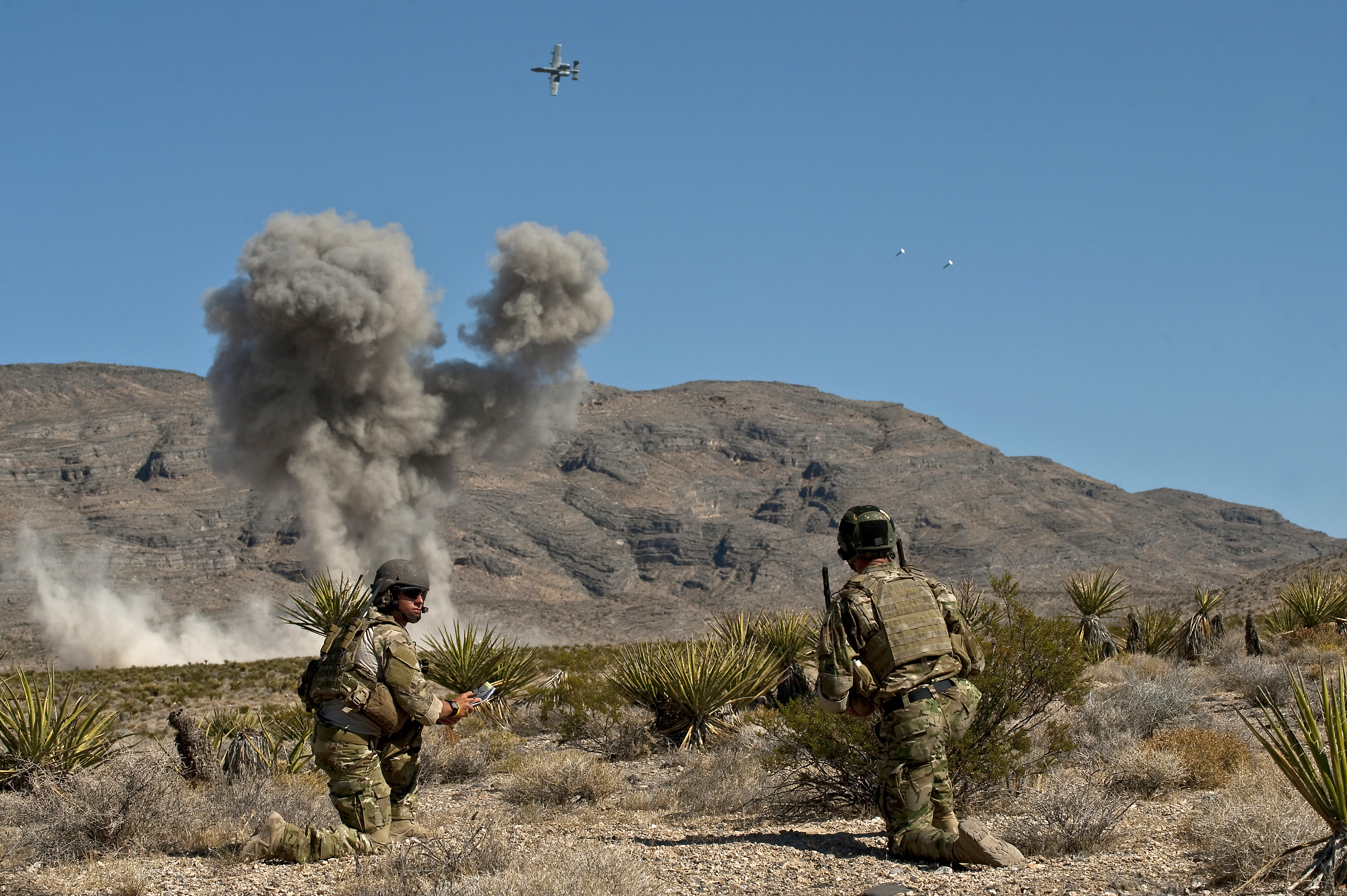
- An A-10 Thunderbolt II releases its munitions during a close air support training mission on September 23, 2011

Site information
- Owner: Department of Defense
- Website: www.nellis.af.mil/Units/NTTR/

Location
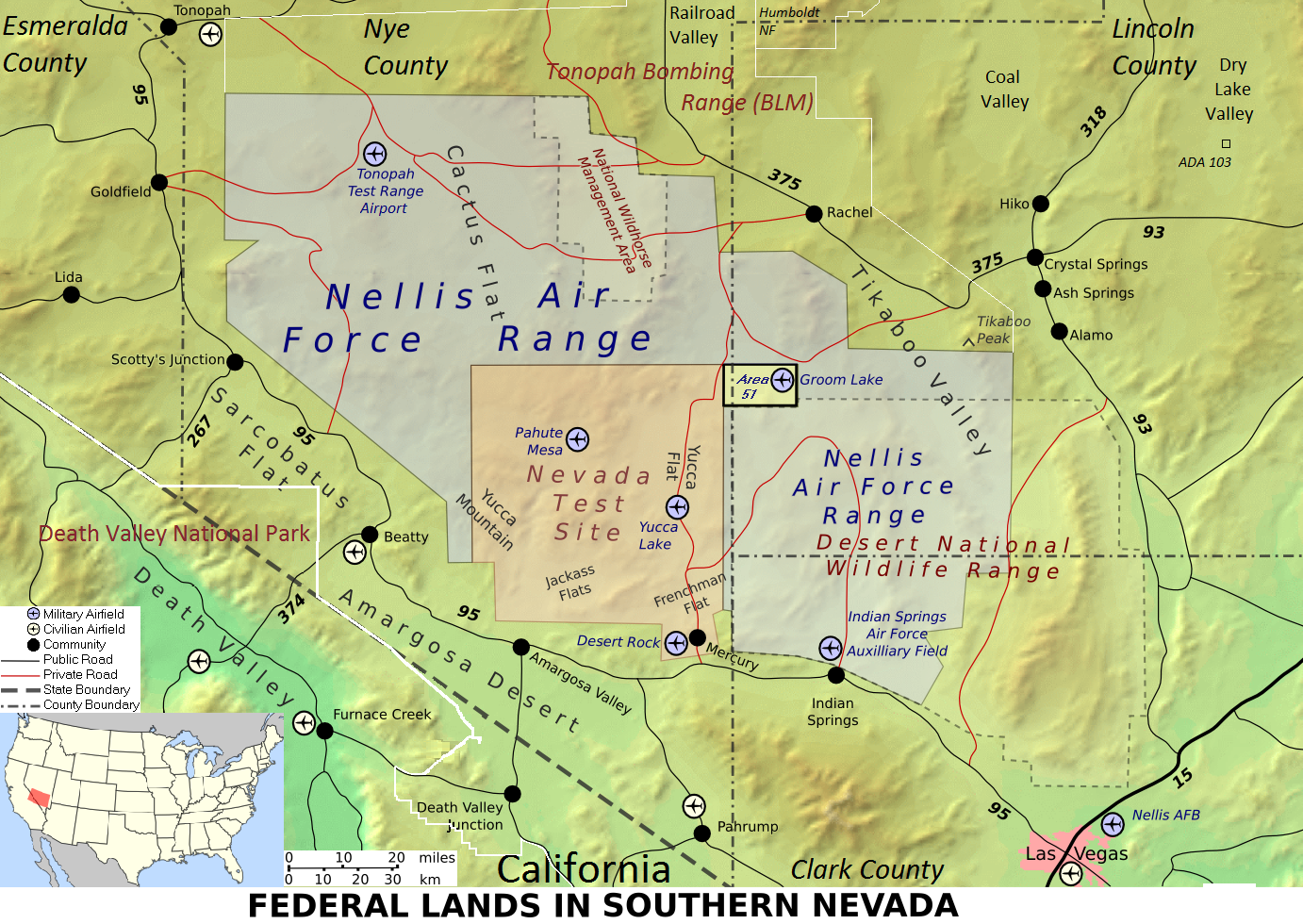
- "Nellis Air Force Range" and nearby federal lands
- Coordinates: 37°31′36″N 116°11′53″W
- Area: Land: 4,531 sq mi (11,740 km^{2}) in 2012; Airspace: 5,000 sq mi (13,000 km^{2}) restricted, 7,000 sq mi (18,000 km^{2}) shared (MOA)

Site history
- Built: established September 29, 1940

Garrison information
- Occupants: 2011: NTTR military unit 2001: 98th Range Wing : 99th Range Group; 1948: ATC Flying Division c. 1945: Fifteenth Air Force; 1942: Fourth Air Force detachment 1941: AFCC & WCACTC
- GNIS code 2511961

The Nevada Test and Training Range (NTTR) is one of two military training areas at the Nellis Air Force Base Complex in Nevada and used by the United States Air Force Warfare Center at Nellis Air Force Base. The NTTR land area includes a "simulated Integrated Air Defense System", several individual ranges with 1200 targets, and 4 remote communication sites. The current NTTR area and the range's former areas have been used for aerial gunnery and bombing, for nuclear tests, as a proving ground and flight test area, for aircraft control and warning, and for Blue Flag, Green Flag, and Red Flag exercises.

== Geography ==
The Nevada Test and Training Range land area is mostly Central Basin and Range ecoregion (cf. southernmost portion in the Mojave Desert), and smaller ecoregions (e.g., Tonopah Basin, Tonopah Playa, and Bald Mountain biomes) are within the area of numerous basin and range landforms of the NTTR.

=== Landforms ===
The NTTR is at the serpentine section of the Great Basin Divide in southern Nevada and uses numerous landforms for military operations, e.g., Groom Lake near the northeast NTTR border is the airstrip for Area 51, the 1955 Site II west of the lake's WWII field. Tolicha Peak and Point Bravo are the sites of for electronic combat ranges, and the Mercury Valley is the eponym for a Cold War camp that became Mercury, Nevada. The Tonopah Test Range, within the boundaries of the NTTR (e.g., "Nellis Range 75") includes Antelope Lake, Radar Hill, and the "Cactus, Antelope, and Silverbow Springs".

=== Northern Range ===
The Northern Range includes the Tolicha Peak Electronic Combat Range (TPECR, e.g., Range 76 targets 76–03, -05, -11, & -14) and Tonopah Electronic Combat Range (the Wildhorse Management Area encircled by the Northern Range is not part of the NTTR.)

=== Eastman Airfield Target ===
The Eastman Airfield Target (Target 76–14, Korean Airfield, 37°22′N 116°50′W) is a Range 76 target 4.3 miles (6.9 km) northwest of the TPECR. The target has a northeastern taxiway loop, characteristic for the former Soviet Air Force base at Jüterbog Airfield in East Germany, and three ramps in front of hangars on the western side of the loop. The other taxiways have a similar layout to Jüterbog, although the runway is about 1,300 feet (400 m) shorter. There are two accompanying SAM sites, one 1.6 miles (2.5 km) northwest of the airfield, and one 3.5 miles (5.6 km) northwest just like the original.

=== Southern Range ===
The Southern Range includes the Point Bravo Electronic Combat Range. An area of about 1,276 sq mi (3,300 km^{2}) of the Southern Range that was withdrawn from the Desert National Wildlife Range is co-managed by the United States Air Force (USAF) and the United States Fish and Wildlife Service.

=== Nearby facilities ===
In addition to Nellis AFB, areas outside of the current NTTR land area are used for related activities, e.g., about 1,107 sq mi (2,870 km^{2}) of the former military range land (relinquished 1942, e.g. ranges 46–56, and c. 1953) is under the Nellis "Area A" airspace that is a Military Operations Area (MOA). The Formerly Used Defense Site north and northeast of the NTTR with "Stone Cabin, Hot Creek, Railroad, Tikaboo, and Sand Spring valleys" is a "former portion of the Tonopah Bombing Range", includes "Permit Required Confined space", and prohibits vehicles in "suspected ordnance impact area[s]" (e.g., "green markings" indicate chemical agents). Most areas adjacent to the NTTR are managed by the Bureau of Land Management for limited non-residential use such as grazing. Temporary sites, e.g., for Patriot Communications Exercises (about "21 days per exercise"), are in the "ADA activity area" east of the NTTR with 13 empty "500 feet by 500 feet" sites for mobile electronic equipment on BLM land in the "Sand Springs Valley, Coal Valley, Delamar Valley, and Dry Lake Valley" ("general area" of the Key Pittman WMA) and "under MOA airspace".

== History ==
"Tertiary age" lava flows formed 5 erupted groups in the area, and block faulting such as the Siebert and Mizpah faults formed the ranges and valleys. Precambrian and Paleozoic marine sediments form an "almost uniform thickness of 40,000 feet", and surface geology is "typically the Cenozoic Era continental deposits and some Paleogene volcanic rocks". Located at the southern tip of the Great Basin tribes area, the eventual range area was crossed by the Old Spanish Trail (trade route), was south of the Pony Express route, and was split by the 37th parallel north of the 1850 New Mexico & 1863 Arizona territories' northwest corner. In the 1930s the land had been used as an Animal Sanctuary where the Department of the Interior made it a wildlife reservation. However, in 1942 during World War II the region restricted it from public access for the War Department to use. The original bombing range had been used for the 1900–1921 silver rush (e.g., Tonopah Mining District & Tonopah Manhattan Stage Route), and the region was subdivided into smaller numbered management areas (e.g., Area 2, Area 5, Area 11, Area 12, Area 25, Area 27, Area 52), which are used for names of some of the range installations (e.g., "Area 3 Compound" and "Area 51" for "Groom Lake Field").

=== Tonopah Bombing Range ===
The Tonopah Bombing Range was designated on federal land "withdrawn ... October 29, 1940, from the public domain" and in June 1941, the "Tonopah Gunnery and Bombing Range" was split at "37 degrees and 30 minutes" latitude into the "Tonopah General Range" and "Las Vegas General Range". On October 28, 1941, "United States v. 1,855,720 Acres of land ..." (US Fifth District) was initiated to seize private land, and in July 1942 the Fourth Air Force Bombing and Gunnery Range Detachment from "Muroc Lake" arrived as the 1st unit. Several Nevada World War II Army Airfields were established, e.g., the August 1942 Tonopah Army Air Field in the north area and in the south, Indian Springs Auxiliary Army Airfield and its additional fields, e.g., at Area 18 (Aux. Field#4) and Area 51 (Aux. Field#1). In February 1943, Indian Springs AAF was being used for the 82d Flying Training Wing for air-to-air gunnery training, and Indian Springs AAF closed in January 1947. In June 1947 Tonopah AAF was declared excess along with its 3 auxiliary areas (Mizpah and Butler housing terraces and Columbia Junction gasoline unloading station). The Indian Springs main facility re-opened in January 1948 and on June 13, 1949, Air Training Command merged the Las Vegas Bombing and Gunnery Range and the Tonopah Bombing and Gunnery Range. On June 28, 1949, the "Gunnery Range of the Tonopah Air Force Base" had about 30 sq mi (78 km^{2}) and after the 1949 Las Vegas Air Force Base was renamed on April 30, 1950, a United States Atomic Energy Commission (AEC) committee selected the "Las Vegas Bombing and Gunnery Range" [sic] for a nuclear test site on December 12, 1950. The land was ideal for training aerial gunners because the land was far from people and contained dry lake beds, which worked perfectly for target practices.

=== Nellis Air Force Gunnery and Bombing Range ===
A 680-square mile section of the Nellis Air Force Gunnery and Bombing Range was designated the Nevada Proving Grounds (NPG) on December 18, 1950. The new NPG included "Yucca and Frenchman Flats, Paiute and Rainier Mesas". The presidential order also established Groom Lake Field (colloq. "The Pig Farm") at the WWII installation. The first NPG nuclear test was for Operation Ranger on January 27, 1951, and the Indian Springs main facility (renamed an Air Force Base in 1951) supported NPG testing after ARDC General Order No. 39 on July 16, 1952. The NPG Camp Desert Rock "military support facility" (now the private Desert Rock Airport) operated September 1951-October 7, 1957 (electricity was from AEC's Camp Mercury) and closed June 18, 1964. In 1955 on the southwest corner of Groom Lake, a survey team laid out the 5,000-foot (1,500 m) north–south "Site II" runway for Project AQUATONE. The 1st Lockheed U-2 (Article 341) left the Skunk Works in a C-124 Globemaster II cargo plane for the AQUATONE site in July 1955 and first flew on July 29 during a runway test. The Tonopah Test Range (TTR) land was withdrawn from public use in 1956 to replace nuclear test sites at the "Salton Sea Test Base" and the Yucca Flat site, and in 1957 Sandia Laboratories began TTR operations at Cactus Flat.

From 1956 to 1969–70, the Las Vegas Air Force Station and Tonopah Air Force Stations provided Reno Air Defense Sector radar tracks and in 1957, the "instrumented AEC range at Tonopah" was used by NAS Fallon and Point Mugu pilots. "A safety experiment (Project 57 No. 1) with ground zero coordinates of N 932646, E 688515 was detonated on April 24, 1957" in "Area 13" at the northeast NTTR boundary. In 1958, the Tonopah Test Range Airport was planned with a single runway of 19,000 ft (5,800 m). In 1960, Camp Mercury was a base camp for Project 5.5 that studied nuclear detonation effect on the Northrop F-89D Scorpion (a similar Project 6.5 was for effect of nuclear detonations on the Nike Hercules missile system). A 1961 Public Land Order transferred USAF land to the AEC, and after the 1962 RBS Express #2 near the Hawthorne Naval Ammunition Depot was used for Radar Bomb Scoring of flights over the range, the Hawthorne Bomb Plot radar station operated in Babbitt until c. 1993. Operation Roller Coaster was a TTR nuclear test series in May and June 1963 and in November and December 1965, B-52 Combat Skyspot testing at the range used the only CONUS AN/MSQ-77 developed for the Vietnam War. Planning to integrate the range with the Fallon and Hill/Wendover/Dugway ranges to create the Great Basin's "Continental Operations Range" ended in 1975, the first year for a Nellis range Red Flag exercise.

=== Nellis Air Force Range ===
The Nellis Air Force Range (NAFR) was used to bury wreckage of the 1978 Groom Lake & 1979 NAFR Lockheed F-117 Nighthawk crashes, and additional Cold War accidents at the range included the 1975 NAFR TR-1 crash, the 1979 Tonopah MiG-17 crash during training versus an Northrop F-5, the 1984 Little Skull Mountain MiG-23 crash, which killed a USAF general, and the 1986 NAFR crash, which "Air Force sources" identified as an "F-19" stealth fighter. Circa 1980, NAFR received 806L "Range Threat" systems for electronic warfare simulation and from 1983 to 1985, the area of South Antelope Lake was used for two Tomahawk missile targets. NAFR range operations transferred to the 99th Range Group at the end of the Cold War (the range received various Radar Bomb Scoring electronic systems from Strategic Training Ranges, e.g., Nellis had 5 AN/MSQ-77s by 1994). In 1999 the range's land withdrawal was renewed and the unused portion of the original Tonopah Bombing Range was redesignated a Formerly Used Defense Site.

External image
- map at UFOmind.com

In 2001, NAFR was renamed the Nevada Test and Training Range (NTTR) and in October 2001, the range group personnel and assets for range operations transferred to the 98th Range Wing. In 2005, Indian Springs AFAF was renamed Creech Air Force Base and in 2010, the NTS was renamed the Nevada National Security Site. The NTTR had four tracts in the 2010 U.S. census. In 2011, the 98th Range Wing was redesignated with the same name as the range (NTTR).

=== Area 51 Facebook Raid ===
In June 2019, a joke Facebook event was created rallying the public to storm the training range on September 20 that year. Over two million people responded as "going" to the event, with another 1.5 million "interested". The county commission chairman estimated that approximately 40,000 people would turn up on 20 September.

On July 10, speaking with The Washington Post, Air Force spokeswoman Laura McAndrews said officials were aware of the event, and issued a warning saying that the area was "an open training range for the U.S. Air Force, and we would discourage anyone from trying to come into the area where we train American armed forces", adding: "The U.S. Air Force always stands ready to protect America and its assets". A public information officer at Nellis Air Force Base told KNPR that "any attempt to illegally access the area is highly discouraged".
