= KTPH =

KTPH may refer to:

- KTPH (FM), a radio station (91.7 FM) licensed to Tonopah, Nevada, United States
- The ICAO code for Tonopah Airport near Tonopah, Nevada, United States
- Khoo Teck Puat Hospital, a hospital in Yishun, Singapore
