= 15th Attack Squadron =

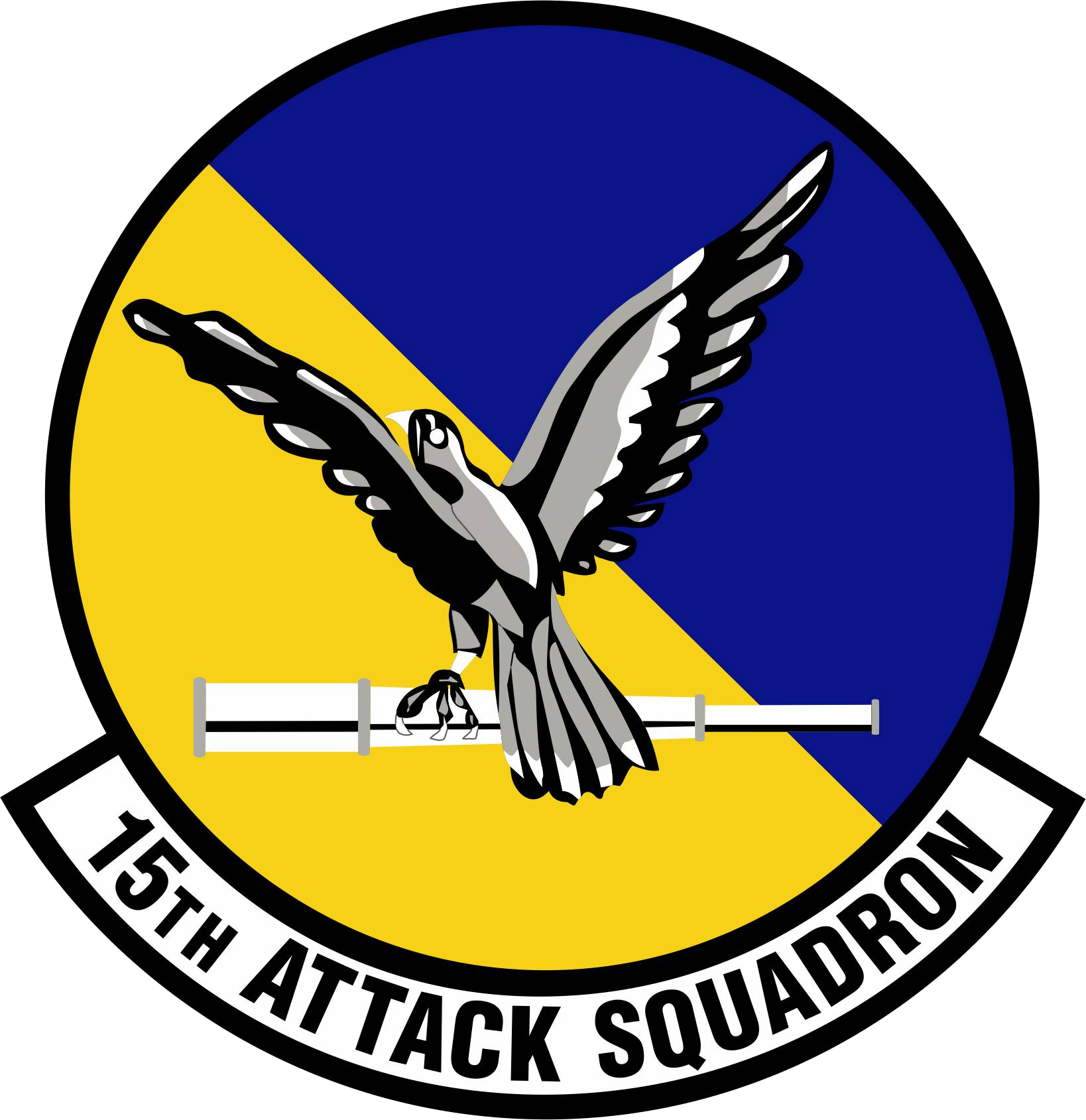
- Active: 1917–1919; 1921–1927; 1928–1946; 1947–1949; 1951–1990; 1991–1994; 1997–present
- Country: United States
- Branch: United States Air Force
- Role: Persistent Attack and Reconnaissance
- Part of: Air Combat Command
- Garrison/HQ: Creech Air Force Base
- Nickname: "Cottonpickers" (c. 1956-c. 1989) (Note: This nickname derived from WWII instances of squadron's aircraft returning with shrubbery in the wings from flying low-level reconnaissance missions.) "Pigeons"
- Mottos: Find, Fix, Finish
- Mascot: Pigeon
- Battle honours: Antisubmarine; European Theater of Operations; Korean War; War on terrorism

Commanders
- Current Commander: Lieutenant Colonel John Stripling
- First Sergeant: MSgt Justin Wilson
- Notable commanders: General Arthur J. Lichte; Lieutenant General Paul Selva; Brigadier General Michelle D. Johnson

Insignia
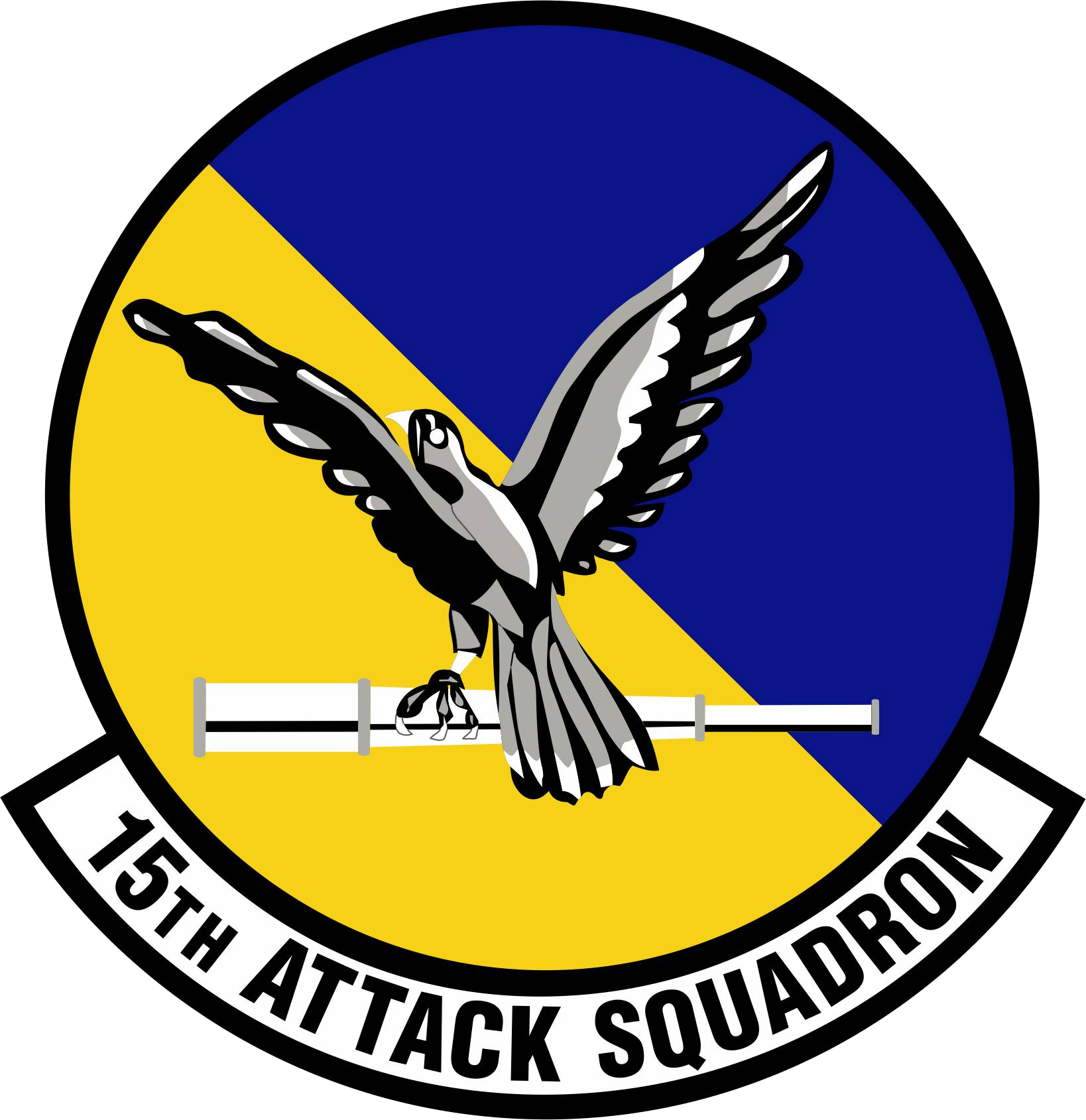
- 15th Attack Squadron emblem (approved 9 March 2017)

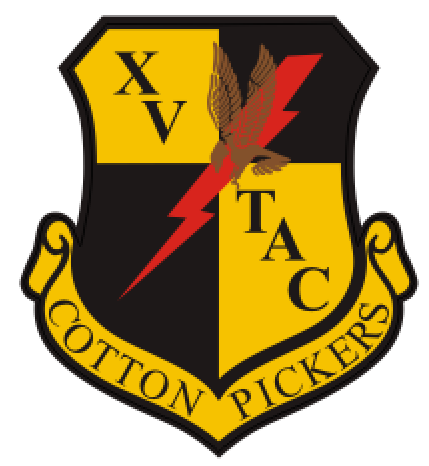
- 15th Tactical Reconnaissance Squadron emblem (Note: Shield quartered in yellow and black, eagle riding a red lightning bolt descending from right to left, XV in upper left yellow quarter, TAC in lower left yellow quarter, scroll below with Cottonpickers. Used while on Okinawa. Apparently the squadron also wore a patch shortly after in converted to the RF-80 depicting a tiger riding a jet plane with a camera for its nose and a bullet narrowly missing the plane. This was not official, however. See Maurer, Combat Squadrons, p. 87 (1924 emblem still official in 1963).)

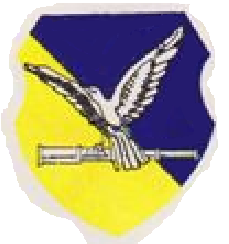
- 15th Observation Squadron emblem (approved 2 April 1924) (Note: A carrier pigeon in natural colors with wings extended perched on a telescope white outlined in black upon a shield of blue and yellow parted diagonally from "northwest" to "southeast", the blue above, the yellow below. Maurer, p. 87) (Note: The 15th Observation Squadron also had a Disney Studios designed emblem with a bee on a cloud peering through binoculars and seated on a camera, while taking notes, all in front of the number 15. It was not official. See Maurer, Combat Squadrons, p. 87 (1924 emblem still official in 1963).)

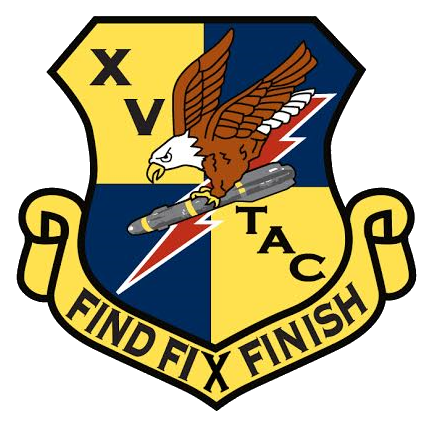
- 15th Attack Squadron Heritage emblem

Aircraft flown
- MQ-9 Reaper

The 15th Attack Squadron is a United States Air Force unit assigned to the 432d Wing, 732nd Operations Group at Creech Air Force Base near Indian Springs, Nevada. It flies the General Atomics MQ-9 Reaper remotely piloted aircraft.

It was the second of the Air Force's RQ-1 Predator remotely piloted aircraft squadrons. The squadron provides combatant commanders with persistent intelligence, surveillance and reconnaissance, full-motion video, and precision weapons employment. Global operations support continuous MQ-9 Reaper employment providing real-time actionable intelligence, strike, interdiction, close air support, and special missions to deployed war fighters. The squadron operates medium altitude multi-sensor platforms. It also collects, exploits and distributes imagery and intelligence products to the Unified Combatant Commands and national-level leadership.

== History ==
=== World War I ===
The 15th Attack Squadron's origins go back to 8 May 1917, when it stood up as the 2d Aviation School Squadron at Hazelhurst Field, Long Island, New York. A little more than three months later, the squadron became the 15th Aero Squadron. The original mission of the squadron was as part of the New York City defenses, flying coastal patrols and as a flying training unit. The squadron was demobilized at Hazelhurst on 18 September 1919, after the end of World War I.

=== Interwar years ===
The 15th Squadron (Observation) was organized in the Army Air Service on 21 September 1921 at Chanute Field, Illinois, and equipped primarily with Dayton-Wright DH-4s. the main focus of the squadron was flying training, including gunnery, observation, reconnaissance, photography, radio familiarization and similar missions. The squadron served as the air component of the 6th Division. In April 1924 the squadron, now the 15th Observation Squadron was consolidated with its World War I predecessor. The squadron moved to Kelly Field, Texas in June 1927, where on 1 August, it was inactivated and its personnel and equipment used to form the 39th School Squadron.

The squadron reformed at Selfridge Field, Michigan on 15 March 1928, once again providing air support for the 6th Division. On 20 March 1938, the 15th Observation Squadron deployed from Scott Field, Illinois, to Eglin Field, Florida, for two weeks of gunnery training. Thirty-five officers and 108 enlisted men were involved.

=== World War II ===
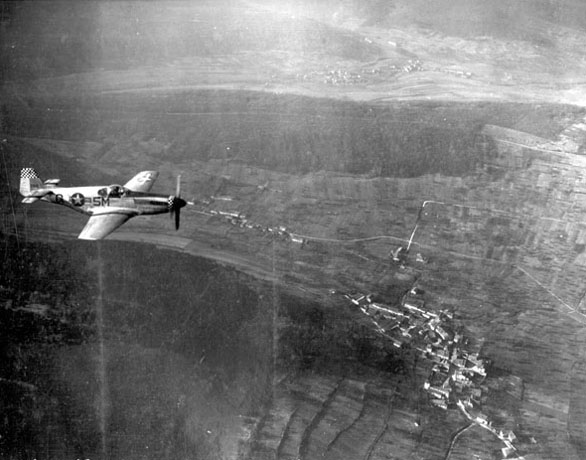
15th Reconnaissance Squadron F-6C Mustang (fuselage code 5M-Q)

During the early stages of World War II, the 15th supported the Field Artillery School in Oklahoma. On 26 March 1944, the unit deployed to England and began combat operations over France. Its first combat mission was photographic reconnaissance on a North American F-6 Mustang. On 6 June 1944, the 15th received credit for the first aerial victory by a tactical reconnaissance pilot as well as the first victory of D-Day. The unit continued armed reconnaissance operations in the European theater until July 1945. After returning to the United States, the squadron provided visual and photographic reconnaissance and artillery adjustments for Army, Navy and Air Forces until it was inactivated in April 1949.

=== Korean War ===
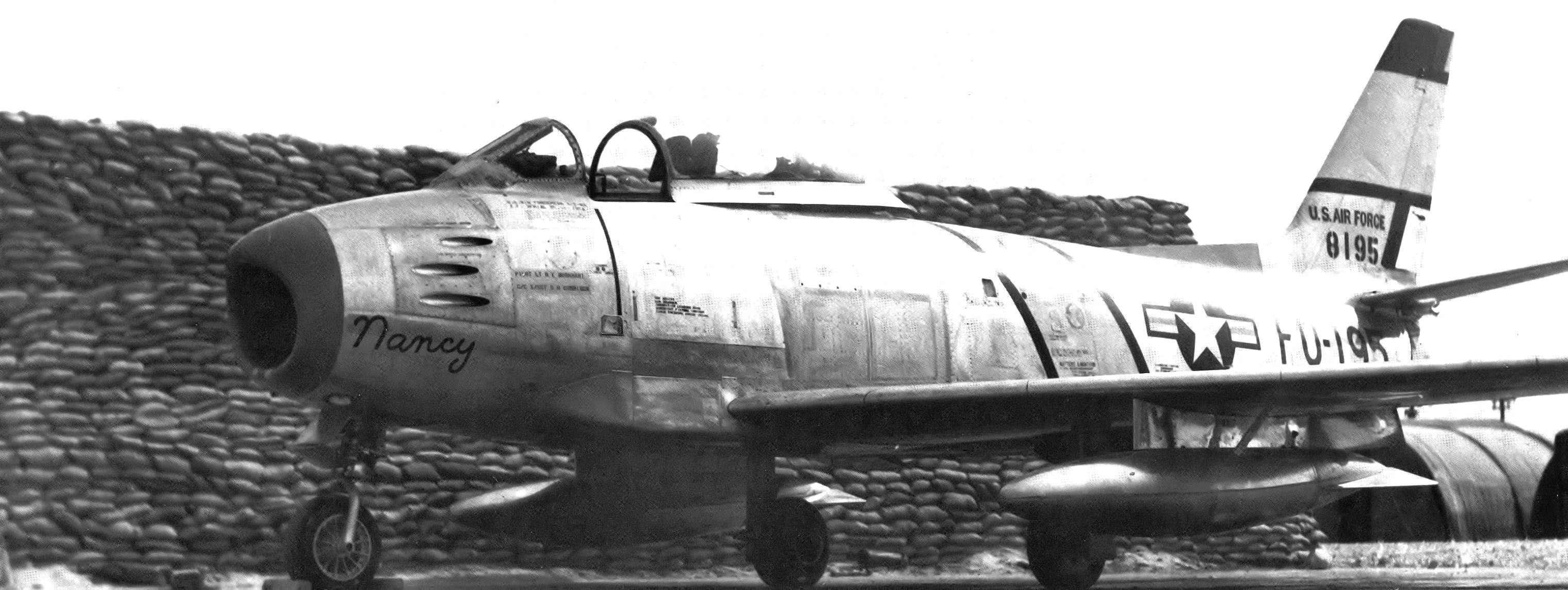
15th Tactical Reconnaissance Squadron RF-86A Sabre (Note: Aircraft is North American RF-86A-5-NA Sabre serial 48–195 at K-14 Airfield, South Korea, 1952.)

The 15th Tactical Reconnaissance Squadron, Photo-jet, was reactivated on 5 February 1951, in Japan and immediately deployed to Korea to provide visual and photographic reconnaissance. The unit flew Lockheed F-80 Shooting Stars North American F-86 Sabres and the RF-80 and RF-86 reconnaissance versions of these fighters during this period.

=== Pacific reconnaissance ===
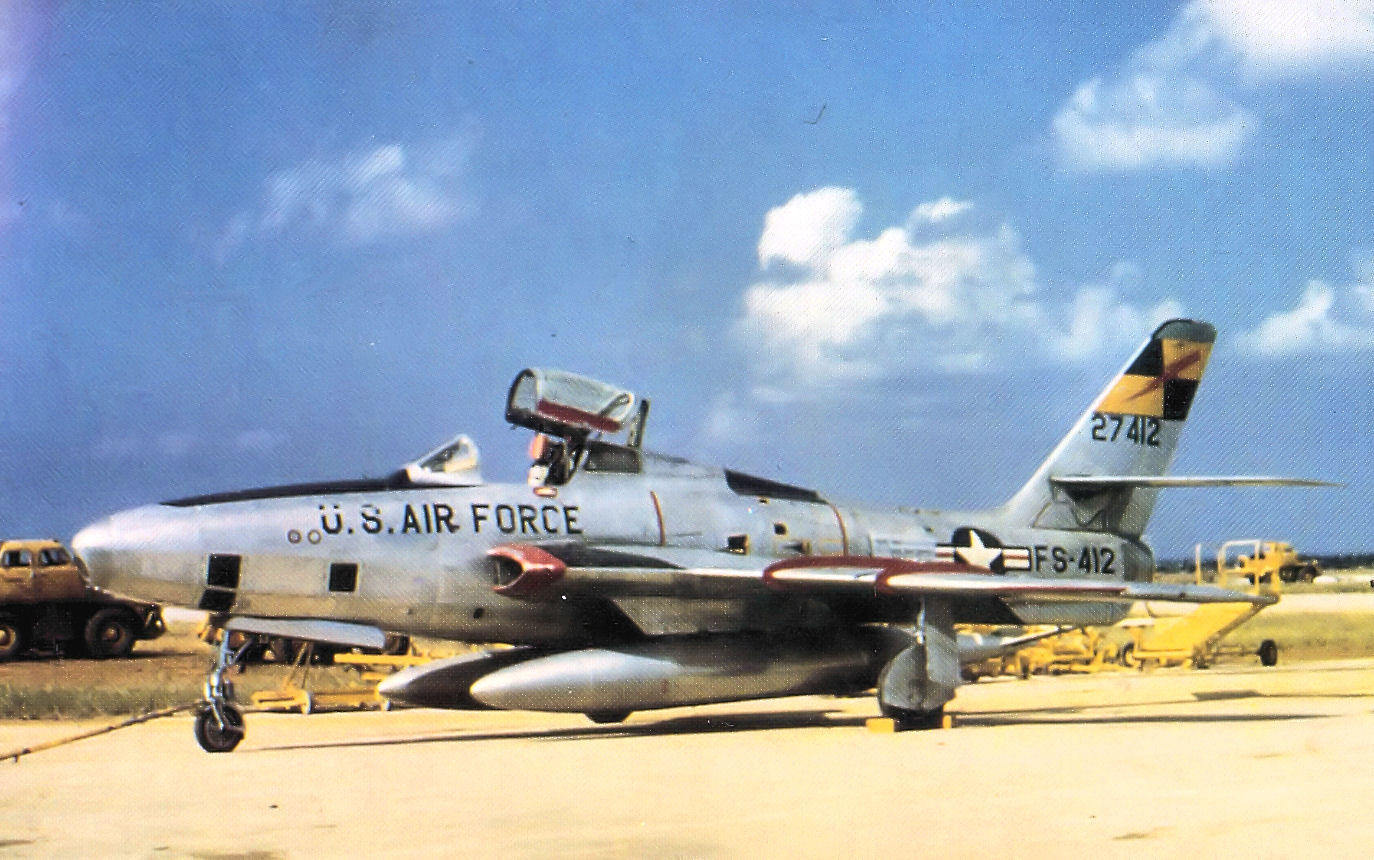
RF-84F Thunderflash at Kadena AB (Note: Aircraft is Republic RF-84F-30-RE Thunderflash, serial 52-7412, taken in 1956.)

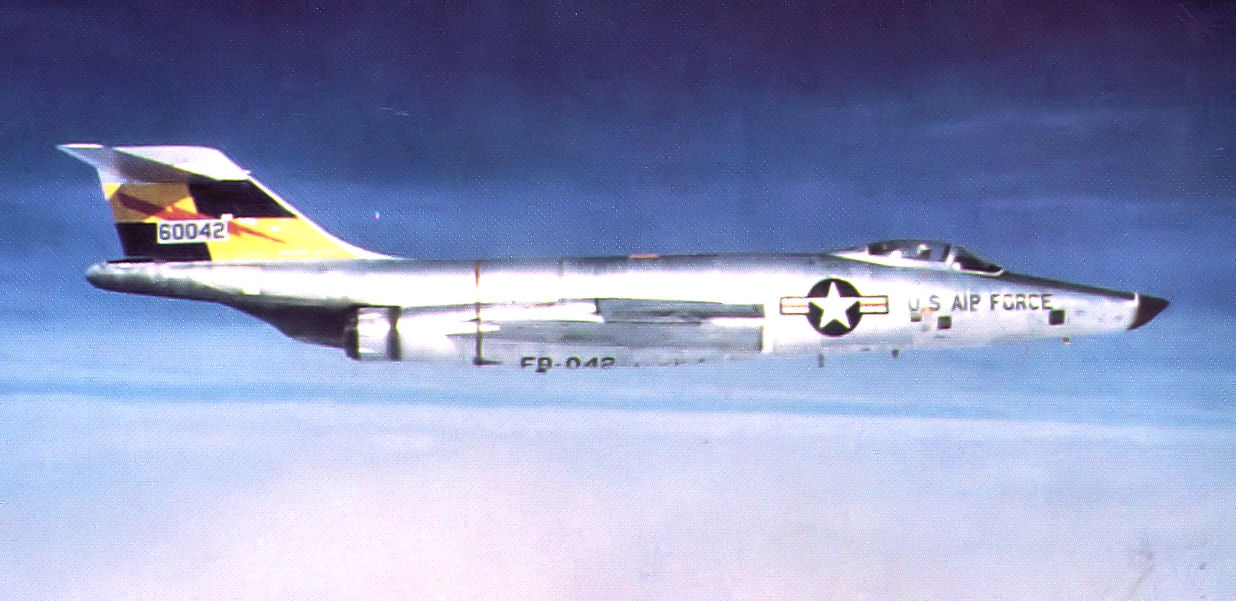
RF-101 Voodoo at Kadena AB (Note: Aircraft is RF-101 Voodoo, serial 56-42, taken in 1960.)

In March 1954 the unit moved back to Japan and in August 1956, moved to Okinawa. The unit transitioned to Republic RF-84F Thunderflashes from 1956 to 1958 and then to McDonnell RF-101 Voodoos, continuing its long history of photographic reconnaissance. During the Vietnam era the 15th Squadron was based at Kadena Air Base, Okinawa, flying the RF-101C. The unit had many deployments to Southeast Asia, flying reconnaissance missions in support of US combat operations in that theatre. From 14 – 28 March 1961, the 18th Tactical Fighter Wing deployed the 15th Reconnaissance Squadron to Kung Kuan Air Base, Taiwan equipped with McDonnell RF-101 Voodoo.

During the summer and fall of 1966, the squadron transitioned to the McDonnell RF-4C Phantom II, the aircraft that it was to operate for the next 25 years. Redesignated as 15 Tactical Reconnaissance Squadron on 8 Oct 1966.

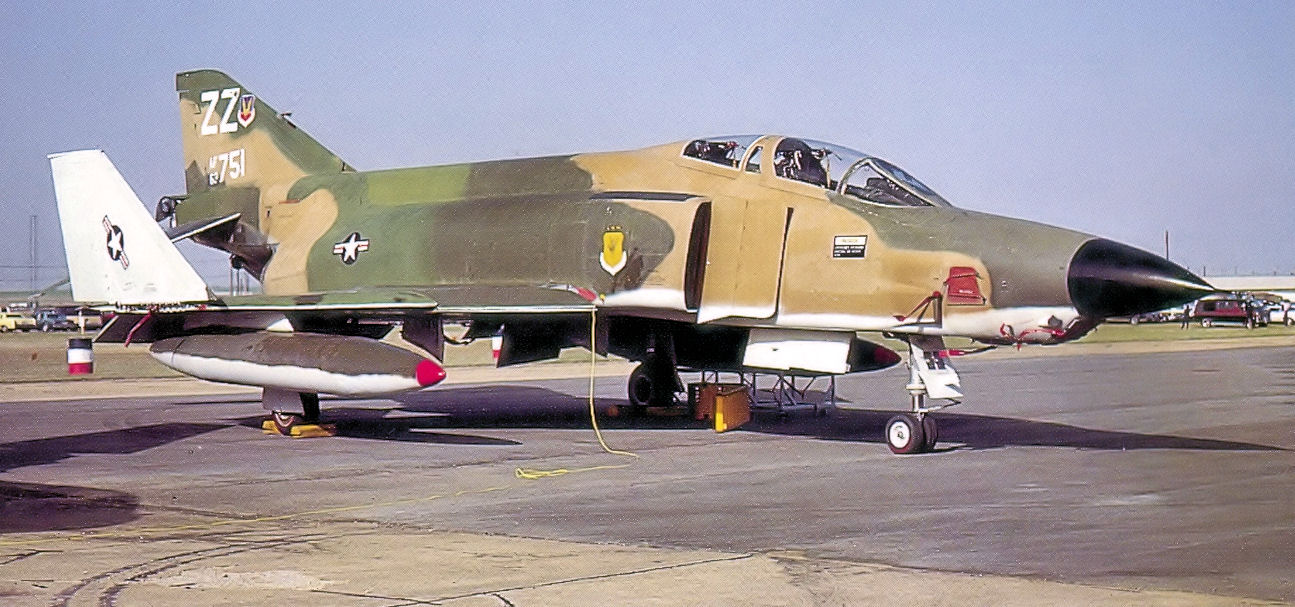
15th Tactical Reconnaissance Squadron RF-4C Phantom II (Note: Aircraft is McDonnell RF-4C-19-MC Phantom II, serial 63-7751 at Kadena AB, Okinawa in 1975.)

In January 1968 the squadron deployed from Kadena to Osan Air Base, Korea in support of Operation Combat Fox, flying reconnaissance missions over North Korea during the Pueblo Crisis under extremely harsh winter conditions that disabled many of the squadron's aircraft, reducing squadron strength to as low as six aircraft at one point. One aircraft, tail number 748, flown by Captains Lee and Hannikin, was lost on mission during this period. Despite many searches, the wreckage and bodies weren't located until after the spring melt. A second aircraft was lost in an accident after the squadron moved to Itazuke Air Base, Japan.

During the 1970s and 1980s, the squadron maintained aerial surveillance capabilities in support of American ground, naval and air forces in the Far East. The 15th Squadron was inactivated 1 October 1990.

=== Intelligence activities ===
The unit was reactivated as the 15th Tactical Intelligence Squadron on 20 February 1991. On 13 April 1992, the unit was redesignated as the 15th Air Intelligence Squadron. On 1 June 1994, it was once more inactivated.

=== Remotely Piloted Aircraft operations ===
The unit was reactivated as the 15th Reconnaissance Squadron on 1 August 1997, at Indian Springs Air Force Auxiliary Field under the 57th Operations Group. It was assigned to fly the General Atomics MQ-1 Predator remotely piloted aircraft.

From July 2005 to June 2006, the 15th Reconnaissance Squadron participated in more than 242 separate raids; engaged 132 troops in contact-force protection actions; fired 59 Hellfire missiles; surveyed 18,490 targets; escorted four convoys; and flew 2,073 sorties for more than 33,833 flying hours.

Starting in 2005, the unit trained California Air National Guard's 163d Reconnaissance Wing members to operate the MQ-1. The 163d is being retasked as an MQ-1 unit. In May 2016, the squadron was redesignated the 15th Attack Squadron. The MQ-1 Predator was retired from United States Air Force service on 9 March 2018.

== Lineage ==
15th Aero Squadron

- Organized as the 2d Aviation School Squadron on 9 May 1917

Redesignated 15th Aero Squadron on 22 August 1917
Demobilized on 18 September 1919
Reconstituted, and consolidated with the 15th Observation Squadron as the 15th Observation Squadron on 8 April 1924

15th Attack Squadron

- Authorized as the 15th Squadron (Observation) on 30 August 1921

Organized on 21 September 1921
Redesignated 15th Observation Squadron on 25 January 1923
Consolidated with the 15th Aero Squadron on 8 April 1924
Inactivated on 1 August 1927

- Activated on 15 May 1928

Redesignated 15th Observation Squadron (Medium) on 13 January 1942
Redesignated 15th Observation Squadron on 4 July 1942
Redesignated 15th Reconnaissance Squadron (Fighter) on 2 April 1943
Redesignated 15th Tactical Reconnaissance Squadron on 11 August 1943
Inactivated on 31 March 1946

- Activated on 3 December 1947

Inactivated on 1 April 1949

- Redesignated 15th Tactical Reconnaissance Squadron, Photo-Jet on 5 February 1951

Activated on 25 February 1951

- Redesignated 15th Tactical Reconnaissance Squadron on 8 October 1966

Inactivated on 1 October 1990

- Redesignated 15th Tactical Intelligence Squadron on 20 February 1991

Activated on 15 March 1991
Redesignated 15th Air Intelligence Squadron on 13 April 1992
Inactivated on 1 June 1994

- Redesignated 15th Reconnaissance Squadron on 31 July 1997

Activated on 1 August 1997
Redesignated 15th Attack Squadron on 15 May 2016

=== Assignments ===
- Unknown, 1917–1919 (Note: Possibly Aeronautical Division (later Air Division), Signal Corps, 9 May 1917; Training Section, Department of Military Aeronautics, Signal Corps, 24 April 1918; Operations Section, Department of Military Aeronautics, Signal Corps, 9 July 1918; Training and Operations Group, Air Service, 29 January – 18 September 1919. Dollman.)
- Sixth Corps Area, 21 September 1921
- 6th Division Air Service, 24 March 1923 (attached to Sixth Corps Area)
- Sixth Corps Area, June–1 August 1927
- 6th Division Air Service (later 6 Division Aviation), 15 May 1928 (attached to Sixth Corps Area)
- 14th Observation Group, 8 May 1929 (attached to Sixth Corps Area)
- 12th Observation Group, 17 July 1937 (attached to Sixth Corps Area) (Note: Dollman just says July 1937. However, Clay also indicates the 12th Group was inactivated on 1 July 1937. Clay, p.1306.)

Detachment operated at Field Artillery School, 1 December 1940

- Field Artillery School, c. 9 Jan 1941
- III Air Support Command, 1 September 1941 (attached to Field Artillery School, further attached to 68th Observation Group, 12 December 1941 – 2 February 1942)
- 73d Observation Group (later 73d Reconnaissance Group, 73d Tactical Reconnaissance Group, 10th Photographic Group), 12 March 1942 (attached to Field Artillery School until 1 April 1942)
- Ninth Air Force, 22 December 1943 (attached to 67th Tactical Reconnaissance Group)
- IX Fighter Command, 30 Dec 1943 (attached to 67th Tactical Reconnaissance Group)
- 67th Tactical Reconnaissance Group, 4 January 1944 (attached to IX Air Support Command (later IX Tactical Air Command) (Note: Dollman says "later XIX Air Support Command." However, XIX Air Support Command was a different unit. Maurer, Combat Units, pp. 451-452. This attachment is omitted in Maurer, Combat Squadrons, p. 86) until c. 16 March 1944)
- 10th Photographic Group (later 10th Reconnaissance Group), 13 June 1944 (attached to IX Tactical Air Command until 27 June 1944)

Flight attached to 67th Tactical Reconnaissance Group, 3–12 August 1944

- United States Strategic Air Forces in Europe, 24 June 1945
- Third Air Force, 3 August 1945
- First Air Force, 3 February 1946
- Tactical Air Command, 21–31 March 1946
- 10th Reconnaissance Group (later 10th Tactical Reconnaissance Group), 3 December 1947 – 1 April 1949 (attached to 363d Reconnaissance Group, 22 August – 3 November 1948)
- 67th Tactical Reconnaissance Group, 25 Feb 1951 (attached to 67th Tactical Reconnaissance Wing, 1 June–c. 25 November 1954 and after 1 July 1957)
- 67th Tactical Reconnaissance Wing, 1 October 1957 (attached to 18th Tactical Fighter Wing after 15 March 1960)
- 313th Air Division, 25 April 1960 (attached to 18th Tactical Fighter Wing until 20 April 1970)
- 18th Tactical Fighter Group, 1 May 1978
- 18th Tactical Fighter Wing, 11 February 1981
- 460th Tactical Reconnaissance Group, 1 October 1989 – 1 October 1990
- 548th Reconnaissance Technical Group, 15 March 1991
- Pacific Air Forces, 3 July 1991
- 15th Operations Group, 13 April 1992 – 1 June 1994
- 57th Operations Group, 1 August 1997
- 432d Operations Group, 1 May 2007 – 2017
- 732d Operations Group, 2017 - current

=== Stations ===
- Hazelhurst Field, New York, 9 May 1917 – 18 September 1919
- Chanute Field, Illinois, 21 September 1921
- Kelly Field, Texas, June–1 August 1927
- Selfridge Field, Michigan, 15 May 1928 (Deployed to Camp McCoy, Wisconsin, 24 September – 28 October 1928; Camp Skeel, Michigan, 28–31 October 1928; Fort Sheridan, Illinois, 8–11 June 1930; Bowman Field, Kentucky, 14–27 June 1930)
- Scott Field, Illinois, circa 28 June 1930. (Detachment at Post Field, Oklahoma after c. 1 December 1940)
- Post Field, Oklahoma 9 January 1941
- Ellington Field, Texas, 16 December 1941 (Flight at Post Field, Oklahoma, until April 1942)
- Godman Field, Kentucky, 23 April 1942
- Camp Campbell Army Air Field, Kentucky, 26 June 1942
- Key Field, Mississippi, 6 November – 4 December 1943
- RAF Aldermaston (AAF-467), England, 22 December 1943
- RAF Chilbolton (AAF-404), England, 1 March 1944
- RAF Middle Wallop (AAF-449), England, 16 March 1944
- RAF Chalgrove (AAF-465), England, 27 June 1944
- Rennes Airfield (A-27), France, 10 August 1944
- Châteaudun Airfield (A-39), France, 26 August 1944
- Saint-Dizier Airfield (A-64), France, 9 September 1944
- Conflans Airfield (Y-94), France, 1 December 1944
- Trier Airfield (Y-57), Germany, 14 March 1945
- Ober Olm Airfield (Y-64), Germany, 3 April 1945
- Erfurt/Bindersleben Airfield (R-9), Germany, 16 April 1945
- Fürth Airfield (R-28), Germany, 24 April 1945
- Reims-Champagne Airport (A-62), France, 23 June – 13 July 1945
- Drew Field, Florida, 3 August 1945
- MacDill Field, Florida, 21 December 1945
- Shaw Field, South Carolina, 3 February – 31 March 1946
- Pope Field (later Pope Air Force Base), North Carolina, 3 December 1947 – 1 April 1949 (Deployed to Lawson Air Force Base, Georgia, 22 August–September 1948; Turner Air Force Base, Georgia, September 1948; and Eglin Air Force Auxiliary Field No. 3, Florida, 3 October–November 1948)
- Komaki Air Base, Japan, 25 February 1951 (operated from Taegu Air Base, Republic of Korea)
- Taegu Air Base, Republic of Korea, 16 March 1951
- Kimpo Air Base, Republic of Korea, 23 August 1951
- Komaki Air Base, Japan, 2 March 1954.
- Yokota Air Base, Japan, 25 August 1955
- Kadena Air Base, Okinawa (later, Japan), 18 August 1956. (deployed to Kung Kuan Air Base, Taiwan, 14 – 28 March 1961; Osan Air Base, Republic of Korea, 26 January – 12 February 1968; and Itazuki Air Base, Japan, 13 February–c. 25 July 1968)
- Taegu Air Base, Republic of Korea, 1 October 1989 – 1 October 1990
- Hickam Air Force Base, Hawaii, 15 March 1991 – 1 June 1994
- Indian Springs Air Force Auxiliary Field (later Creech Air Force Base), Nevada, 1 August 1997 – present

=== Aircraft ===
- Curtiss JN-4, apparently 1917–1919, 1921–1927.
- Curtiss JN-6, apparently 1917–1919, 1921–1927.
- Dayton-Wright DH-4, apparently 1917–1919, 1921–1927.
- Douglas O-2, 1921–1927, 1928–1930
- Curtiss JNS-1, 1921–1927
- Apparently M-1, 1921–1927
- Thomas-Morse O-19, 1930-c. 1938
- Douglas O-46, 1936-c. 1939
- North American O-47, 1939–1942,
- Douglas O-43, during part of the period 1939–1942
- Stinson O-49 Vigilant, during part of the period 1939–1942
- Curtiss O-52 Owl, during part of the period 1939–1942
- Douglas A-20 Havoc, 1942–1943
- Bell P-39 Airacobra, 1942–1943
- Curtiss P-40 Warhawk, 1942–1943
- North American P-51 Mustang, 1942–1943, 1947–1948
- Supermarine Spitfire, 1943–1944
- Piper L-4 Grasshopper, 1943–1944
- Stinson L-5 Sentinel, 1943–1944
- North American F-6 (later RF-51) Mustang, 1944–1945, 1947–1949
- Lockheed RF-80 Shooting Star, 1951–1956
- North American RF-86 Sabre, 1951–1956
- Lockheed F-80 Shooting Star, 1952–1953
- North American F-86Sabre, 1953
- Republic RF-84F Thunderflash, 1956–1958
- McDonnell RF-101 Voodoo, 1958–1966
- McDonnell RF-4C Phantom II, 1967–1990
- General Atomics MQ-1 Predator, 1997–2018
- General Atomics MQ-9 Reaper, 2018-current

=== Honors ===
==== Campaign streamers ====
- World War II: Europe-Africa-middle Eastern (EAME) Theater: Air Offensive, Europe; Normandy; Northern France; Rhineland Ardenees-Alsace; Central Europe; Air Combat.
- Korean War: First UN Counteroffensive; CCF Spring Offensive; UN Summer-Fall Offensive; Second Korean Winter; Korea Summer-Fall, 1952; Third Korean Winter; Korea Summer-Fall, 1953.

==== Decorations ====
- Distinguished Unit Citations: Korea, 25 February – 21 April 1951; Korea, 9 July – 27 November 1951; Korea, 1 May – 27 July 1953.
- Cite in Order of the Day, Belgian Army: 6 June- [25 June] 1944.
- Republic of Korea Presidential Unit Citation: [25] February 1951 – 31 March 1953.
- Republic of Vietnam Gallantry Cross with Palm: 1 April – 30 November 1966.
- Air Force Outstanding Unit Awards: 1 December 1952 – 3 April 1953; 10 May −27 August 1962; 1 September 1962 – 31 August 1963; 1 August 1964 – 5 June 1965; 6 June 1965 – 31 December 1966; 1 January 1968 – 31 December 1969; 1 January 1974 – 31 December 1975; 1 June 1977 – 31 May 1979; 1 October 1979 – 31 May 1980; 1 July 1981 – 31 May 1983; 1 June 1983 – 31 May 1984; 1 June 1984 – 31 May 1986; 1 June 1987 – 31 May 1989; 1 October 1989 – 30 October 1990; 13 April 1992 – 30 June 1993.

== See also ==
- List of American Aero Squadrons
- Land of Bad
