= Unmanned Aerial Vehicle Battlelab =

Coordinates: 36°35′32″N 115°40′00″W

The UAV Battlelab is a U.S. Air Force flight test and development facility specifically dedicated to developing unmanned aerial vehicles. One of six original Air Force battlelabs established in 1997, this battlelab falls directly under the Air Warfare Center and recently moved to Creech Air Force Base, located near Indian Springs, Nevada from Eglin Air Force Base, Florida.

== Overview ==
The battlelab's mission is to work UAV problems and then go to industry, academia, and service and national labs system for solutions. "Battlelabs find problems, identify solutions and transition them to the warfighter," said Col. Larry Felder, who commands the unit and also assisted with developing the Air Force's original battlelab concept. "Once potential solutions are found, we conduct objective demonstrations to see if the technology, concept, tactics or procedures will actually work and transition the solution to our warfighters," Colonel Felder said.

Even though the battlelab core is on the West Coast, small UAV activities will still be staying at Eglin. The battlelab will continue to improve the Air Force's ability to execute the mission and support joint warfighting initiatives, said the colonel.

"We’re currently going through a buildup process," Colonel Felder said. "We have moved the majority of the organization across country and are building a new team. The key to our immediate future success will be our operating location at Eglin. (Besides) managing our small UAV program, Eglin is the seed corn of knowledge and will be integral to training the new people out here."

Besides subject-matter experts at Eglin, the battlelab relies on liaisons outside the organization for assistance.

"With the help of six liaisons from the Air Force Research Laboratory, Electronic Systems Center and reserve components, our battlelab has the ability to reach back into the Air Force lab system, reach forward into the acquisition system to move technologies from one system to another and look at the mission from a total-force perspective," Colonel Fedner said.

Initially aligned under the Air Warfare Center's 53rd Wing, control of the battlelab transferred to the Aerospace Command and Control and Intelligence, Surveillance and Reconnaissance Center at Langley Air Force Base, Virginia, on 1 March 1999. Control of the battlelab returned to the Air Warfare Center in April 2002 as the UAV mission evolved to include weapons delivery, forward-air control and surface attack.

Since its inception, battlelab initiatives have decreased the time it takes for UAV products to reach decision makers. Officials have also been able to improve UAV target precision coordinates from sensors and enhance integration with other airborne intelligence, surveillance and reconnaissance assets. Battlelab officials have also enhanced the UAV's ability to operate in civil airspace, improved friendly force combat identification and illuminated enemy ground targets for attack.

"We are looking at numerous items for the future," Colonel Felder said. "UAVs originally gave us intelligence, surveillance and reconnaissance, but that has changed with additional roles. We are seeing UAVs used more in the shooter role, and aircraft, such as the unmanned combat aerial vehicle, will give us the capability to carry multiple payloads, pull high G-forces, penetrate airspace that hasn’t been penetrated before and hit high-risk targets without jeopardizing our pilots' lives."

== See also ==
- Unmanned aerial vehicle
- History of unmanned aerial vehicles
- UCAV
- MASINT
