= Area 1 =

Area 1 can refer to:

- Area 1 (Nevada National Security Site), used for nine nuclear detonations, in Nye County, Nevada, U.S.
- Area One, a 2001 touring music festival across Canada and the United States
- Brodmann area 1 or the "postcentral gyrus", part of the human brain
- East Cambridge, Cambridge, Massachusetts, a neighborhood

== See also ==
- Area 2 (disambiguation)
