= Creech Air Force Base =

US Air Force base in Clark County, Nevada

- Indian Springs, Nevada in the US
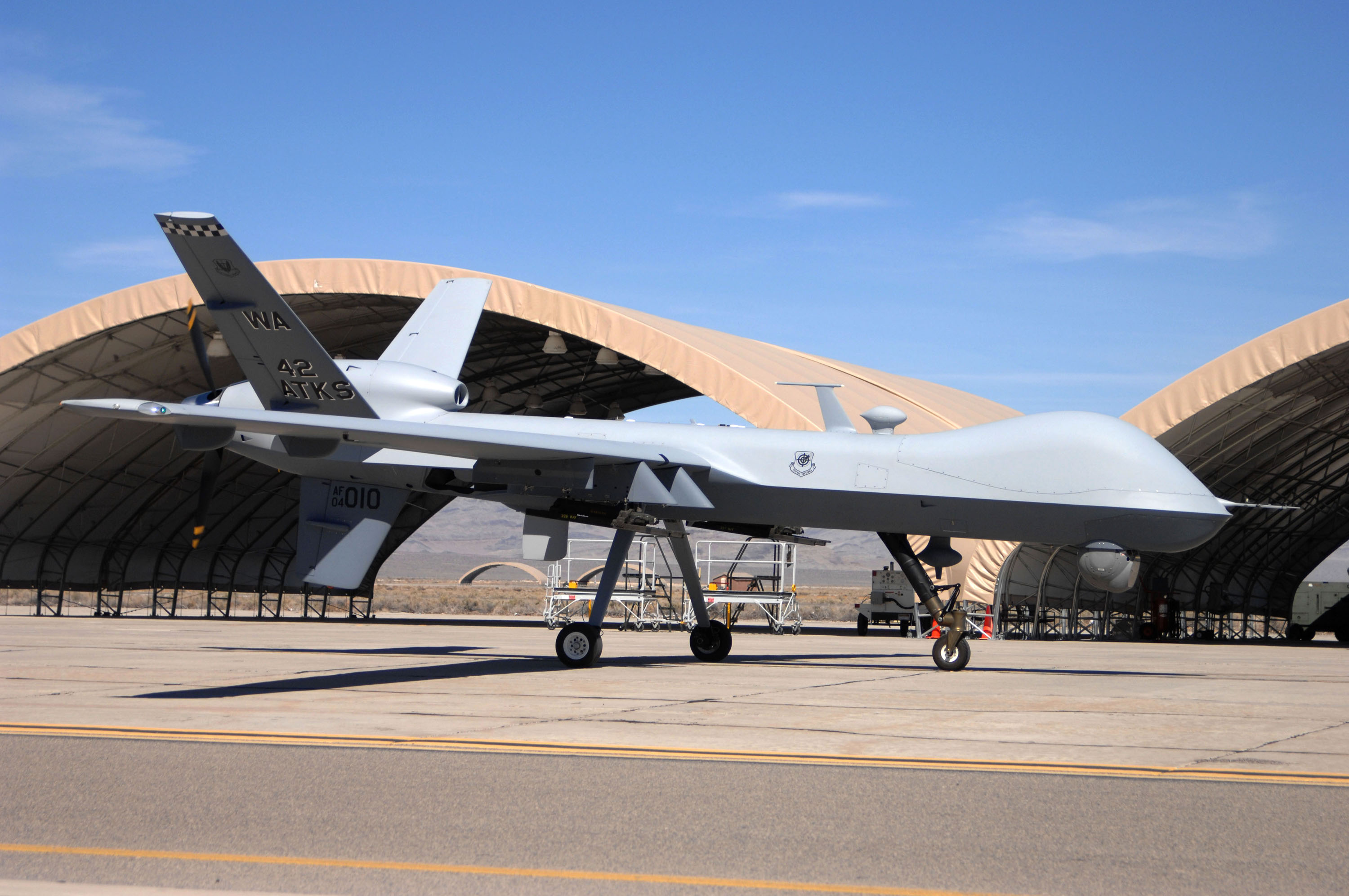
- A MQ-9 Reaper Unmanned Aerial Vehicle taxis at Creech Air Force Base during 2007.

Site information
- Type: US Air Force base
- Owner: Department of Defense
- Operator: US Air Force
- Controlled by: Air Combat Command (ACC)
- Condition: Operational
- Website: www.creech.af.mil

Location
- Location within Nevada Location within the United States
- Coordinates: 36°35′32″N 115°40′00″W
- Area: 2,300 acres (3.6 sq mi)

Site history
- Built: 1941 (as Indian Springs Airport)
- In use: 1942–1945 and 1949–present

Garrison information
- Current commander: Colonel Stephen R. Jones
- Garrison: 432nd Wing

Airfield information
- Identifiers: IATA: INS, ICAO: KINS, FAA LID: INS, WMO: 746140
- Elevation: 955 metres (3,133 ft) AMSL
Runways
Direction	Length and surface
8/26	2,744 metres (9,003 ft) Asphalt
13/31	1,525 metres (5,003 ft) Asphalt

Creech Air Force Base is a United States Air Force (USAF) command and control facility in Clark County, Nevada used "to engage in daily Overseas Contingency Operations …of remotely piloted aircraft systems which fly missions across the globe." In addition to an airport, the military installation has the Unmanned Aerial Vehicle Battlelab, associated aerial warfare ground equipment, and unmanned aerial vehicles of the type used in Afghanistan and Iraq. Creech is the aerial training site for the USAF Thunderbirds and "is one of two emergency divert airfields" for the Nevada Test and Training Range.

In addition to the airfield, the base includes the "UAV-Logistic and Training Facility", the Joint Unmanned Aerial Systems Center of Excellence, Silver Flag Alpha Regional Training Center, and other military units/facilities. The base is named in honor of retired US Air Force General Wilbur L. Creech, the former commanding officer of Tactical Air Command (TAC), the predecessor command of the current Air Combat Command (ACC).

== History ==
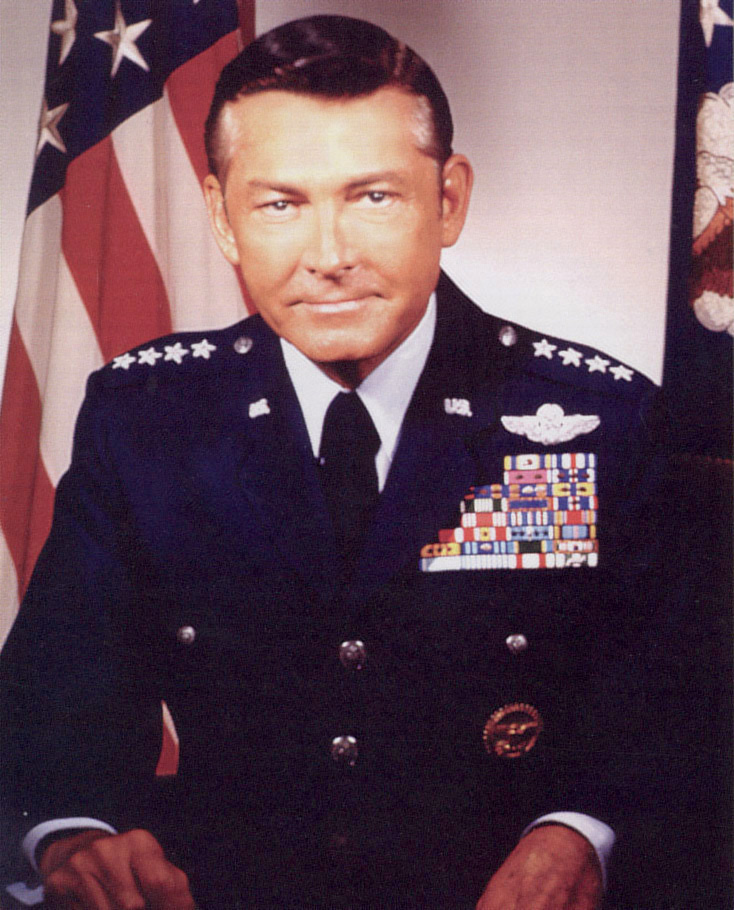
General Wilbur L. Creech, namesake of the base, commander of Tactical Air Command from 1978 to 1984

After World War I, Nevada and other western inland states were surveyed by Capt. Lowell H. Smith and Sgt. William B. Whitefield for landing sites. The United States Army Air Corps subsequently rented a large room in Reno, and used the 1929 civilian airfield near Las Vegas (named "McCarran Field" c. 1935) for 1930s training flights. A 1939 "western site board" reconnaissance was conducted near Tonopah for a practice range and in October 1940, Maj. David Schlatter surveyed the southwest United States for a military airfield (Executive Order 8578 transferred a "60 × 90-mile area at Tonopah to the War Department on 29 October 1940".) Congressional appropriations of 19 November 1941 for the Commissioner of Public Roads to build "21 flight strips" along highways for "bombing ranges or for other specialized training" included inland airstrips. "Initially a "tent city" military training camp", construction of "Indian Springs Airport" permanent facilities began in March 1942, "and by February 1943 the camp was used as a divert field and as a base for air-to-air gunnery training."

Ten protesters were arrested at Creech Air Force Base on 2 October 2019. The base is home to drone operators who pilot drones for both the U.S. military and the CIA in missions across Afghanistan and the Middle East. A week earlier, drones had killed 30 civilian farmers in Afghanistan.

=== Indian Springs Army Airfield ===
The Nevada World War II Army Airfield at Indian Springs hosted B-17 Flying Fortress and T-6 Texan aircraft. Five Indian Springs Auxiliary Army Airfields were developed at the bombing range. Area 18 had an auxiliary field at Auxiliary Field#4, and Area 51 had an auxiliary field Auxiliary Field #1. In March 1945, Indian Springs AAF was placed on stand-by with a small housekeeping staff, and in January 1947, it was closed along with Las Vegas AAF. The Army reopened Indian Springs in January 1948 and in 1950, the first US Air Force unit was assigned to the installation.

Former Indian Springs auxiliary fields:

- Indian Springs Auxiliary Field No. 1

37°16′35″N 115°45′19″W
East side of Groom Dry Lake (a secret 1955 site was built at a different site south of the Groom Lake playa)

- Indian Springs Auxiliary Field No. 2

37°32′03″N 116°29′40″W
Now, two faintly visible runways and a series of taxiways, unused since World War II.

- Indian Springs Auxiliary Field No. 3

37°30′30″N 116°29′00″W
No remains visible. Might have been using part of a dry lake bed.

- Indian Springs Auxiliary Field No. 4 (now Pahute Mesa Airstrip)

37°06′10″N 116°18′45″W

- Indian Springs Auxiliary Field No. 5

37°01′30″N 116°04′00″W
Undetermined, area used in the 1950s for nuclear weapons testing.

=== Indian Springs Air Force Base ===
Indian Springs Air Force Base was designated in August 1951, and in July 1952, jurisdiction transferred from Air Training Command to the Air Force Special Weapons Center (AFSWC) of Air Research and Development Command (ARDC). As an AFSWC facility, "Indian Springs AFB served as a support base for projects from Operation Ranger in 1951 to Operation Storax in 1962." "The 4935th Air Base Squadron was activated to operate the base in accordance with ARDC General Order No. 39 on 16 July 1952". The base's mission was to support United States Atomic Energy Commission (AEC) nuclear testing at the Nevada Proving Grounds, 30 mi (48 km) northwest, as well as Nellis AFB's operation of the Nellis Air Force Gunnery and Bombing Range. "At first fewer than 300 officers and enlisted men were stationed at Indian Springs AFB, but when testing began, the population grew to more than 1,500 personnel. The base also hosted more than 100 of the most modern aircraft in the world at the time."

Operation Teapot
Indian Springs' support of Teapot nuclear tests included hosting media visits and "Official and Congressional Observer groups" e.g., "by agreement reached in January 1955" for flights from Washington. Aircrews at Indian Springs were briefed on weather for tests and when the "Yucca Lake airstrip" became flooded, "nuclear devices" were instead landed at the AFB until Yucca Lake "was completely dried out". AFSWC personnel at Indian Springs AFB provided "facilities and messing for observers and experimental groups, air freight terminal services, servicing for Department of Defense and project vehicles stationed at Indian Springs AFB and transient vehicles", and support of flights between Kirtland and Indian Springs. (The 4925th Special Weapons Group conducted the "live test drops at Nevada" and flew through and sampled "highly radioactive nuclear "clouds" after explosions"—the 4926th Test Squadron (Sampling) also tested Nevada mushroom clouds.)

The Air Base Squadron transferred under the 4950th Test Group (Nuclear) in 1956, the base launched the Shot John F-89J that fired the MB-1 Genie which detonated over Area 10, and AFSWC jurisdiction at Indian Springs AFB "continued until 1961".

=== Indian Springs Air Force Auxiliary Field ===
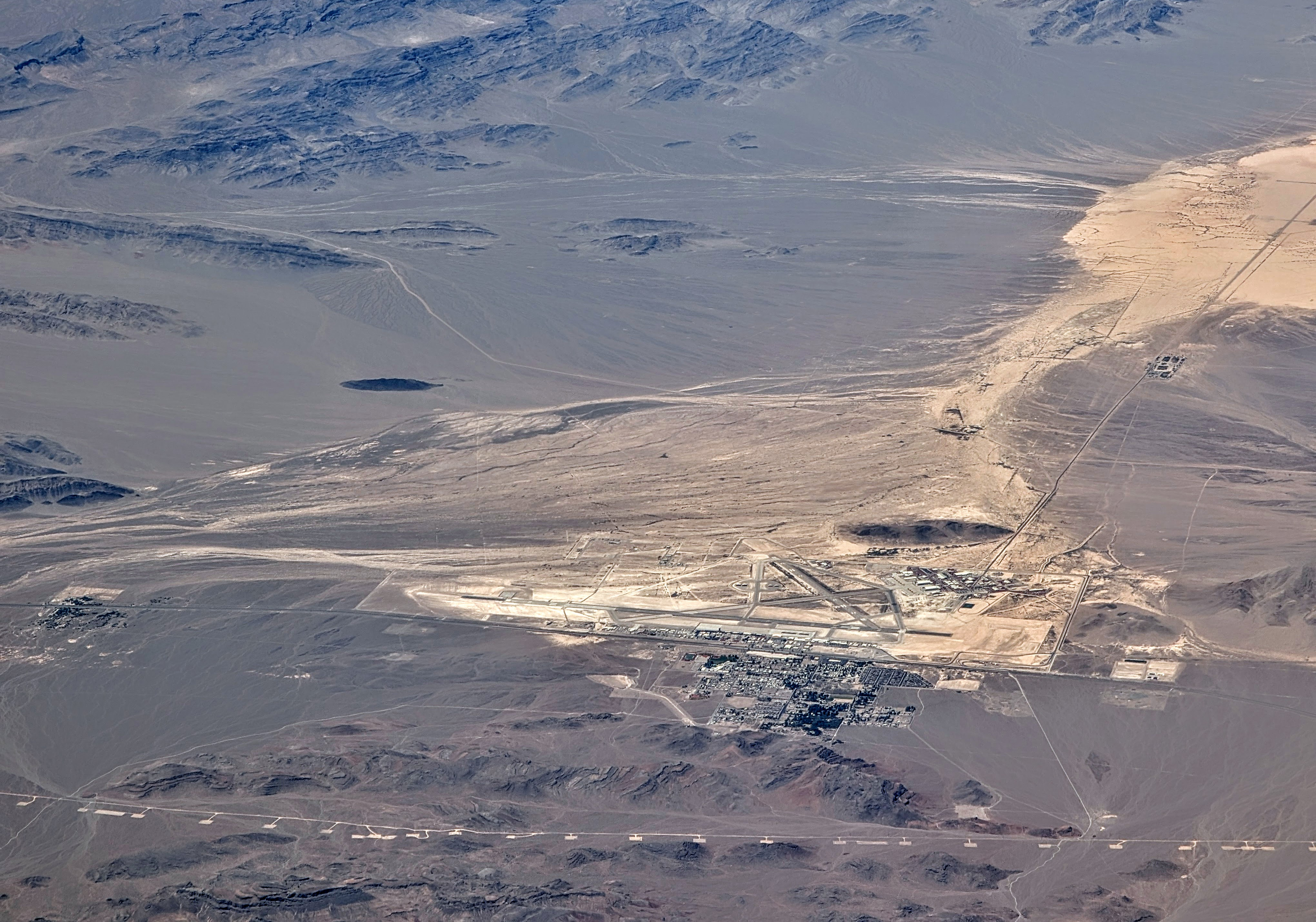
Aerial view of Indian Springs, Nevada, and Creech Air Force Base

Indian Springs Air Force Auxiliary Field was designated on 1 April 1961 when "the USAF transferred Indian Springs AFB missions to Nellis AFB under the control of" Tactical Air Command.

Det 1, AFSWC
Detachment 1, AFSWC had all six aircraft stationed at Indian Springs c. 1963 to support the Nevada Test Site by transporting personnel to/from Camp Mercury and Yucca Flats and to orbit/hover over selected underground tests while monitoring for radiation leaks. Ancillary missions were carried out including target marking at the nearby bombing range for the aircraft from Nellis AFB as well as searching for and retrieving weather balloons. In 1966, the unit replaced two Kaman HH-43 Huskie helicopters with two Bell UH-1F Huey utility helicopters.

During the 1970s and 1980s, the primary base mission was range maintenance and the primary unit was the 57th Combat Support Squadron of civil engineers—the only assigned aircraft unit was a detachment of Bell UH-1N Twin Huey helicopters (designated as "Det 1").

The 1982 Thunderbirds Indian Springs Diamond Crash killed all four Northrop T-38 Talon pilots impacting along the runway (controlled flight into terrain). Around 1988 the bulk of Silver Flag Alpha moved to the Indian Springs Air Force Auxiliary Field from Nellis. Indian Springs AFAF was designated a Formerly Used Defense Site by 30 September 2002. In January 2005, No 1115 Flight was formed at the base to operate the Royal Air Force's first UAVs (became part of No. 39 Squadron RAF in March 2007).

=== Creech AFB ===
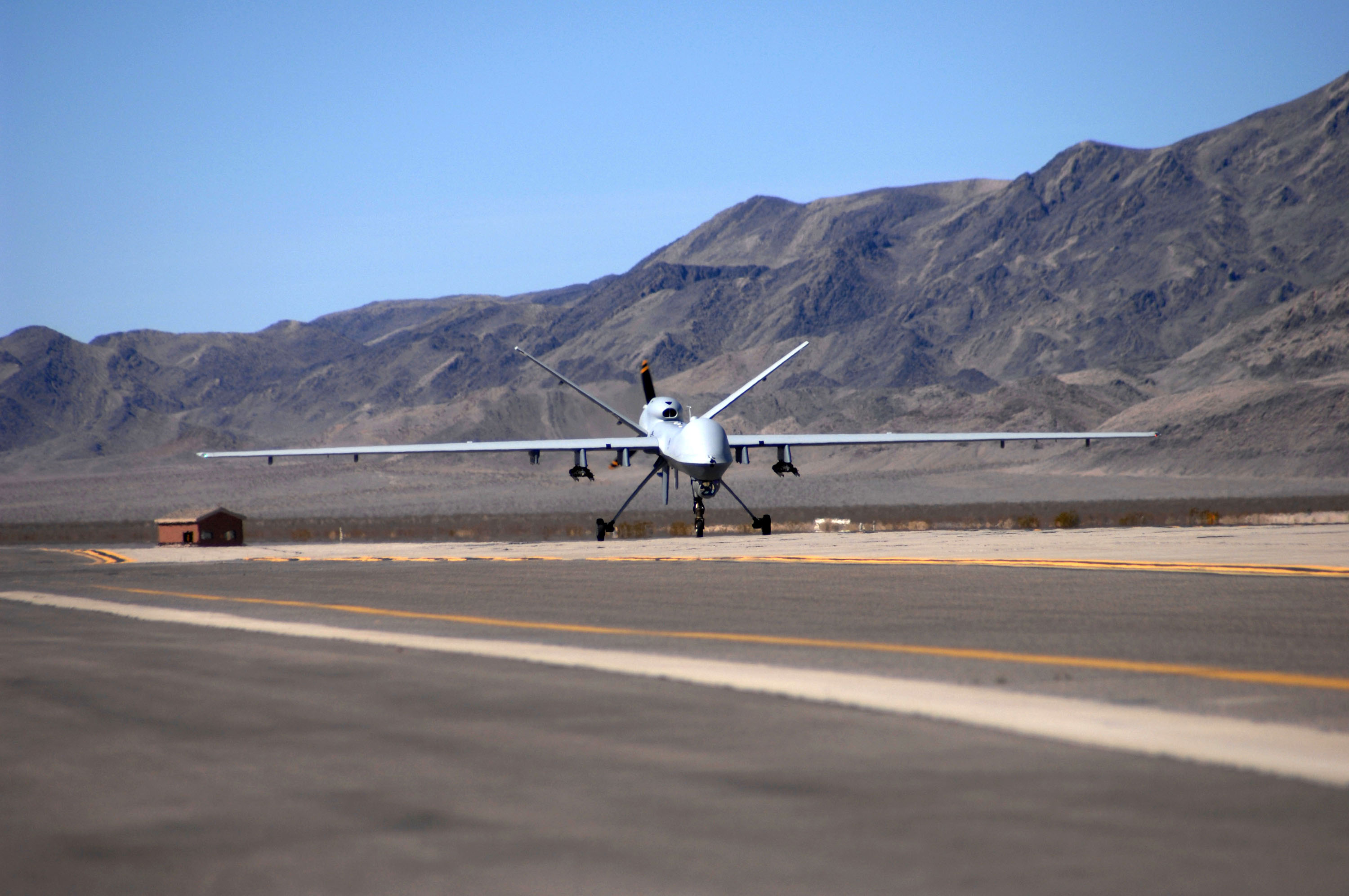
An MQ-9 taxies on a Creech AFB runway

External image
- Creech UAV pilot/copilot console

On 20 June 2005, Indian Springs Air Force Auxiliary Field officially changed its name to Creech Air Force Base in honor of Wilbur L. "Bill" Creech, the commander of Tactical Air Command from 1978 to 1984, and activated in October 2005 the Joint Unmanned Aerial Systems Center of Excellence and the 3d Special Operations Squadron (the latter was the 1st MQ-1 Predator squadron in the Air Force Special Operations Command (AFSOC). The 42d Attack Squadron was formed at Creech AFB on 8 November 2006 as the first Reaper squadron. By 2007, Creech personnel of the 432nd Aircraft Maintenance Squadron had been deployed to Ali Air Base, and the base transferred from a Nellis AFB unit to the 432d Wing when activated on 1 May 2007 On 5 March 2008, the 556th Test and Evaluation Squadron became operational as "the Air Force's [1st] test squadron for unmanned aerial systems". In 2008 the USGS added the military installation to the Geographic Names Information System (the airport portion of the base was separately designated in 2011).

A 2009 Nevada Desert Experience protest against drone attacks on Pakistan by the United States of America resulted in the convictions of the "Creech 14" (e.g., Father Louie Vitale, Kathy Kelly, and John Dear) arrested on the base for trespassing and sentenced on 27 January 2011 for time served (a 2009 protest was also held.) In 2011, keystroke logging software had infected UAV ground stations ("believed to have spread through...removable drives"), and the Twenty-Fourth Air Force was alerted to the problem by an article in Wired magazine. (The virus "posed no threat to our operational mission".) In 2012, the ceremony in which the 99th Security Forces Group "stands down" also activated the 799th Air Base Group at Creech.

In July 2019, the 799th Air Base Group was inactivated and responsibility for base support operations transferred to the newly activated the 432nd Mission Support Group, part of the 432nd Wing. The change allowed the 432nd Wing to become installation command authority at Creech, representing a shift away from the base relying on nearby Nellis AFB for support.

==== Silver Flag Alpha RTC ====
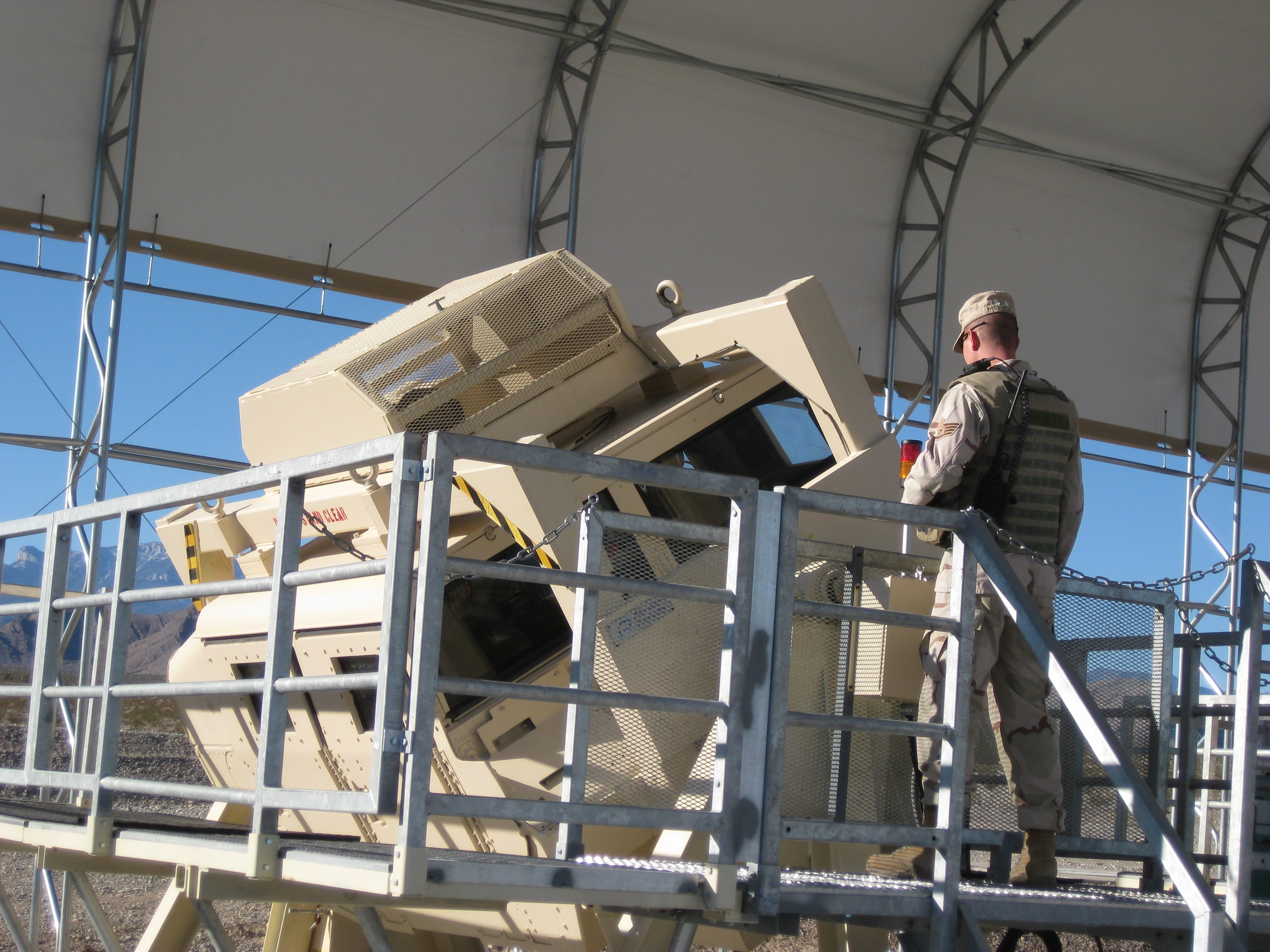
An instructor from the 99th GCTS overseeing 'HMMWV Egress Assistance Training' (HEAT) at Silver Flag Alpha RTC

Creech was also home to the "Silver Flag Alpha Regional Training Center", operated by the 99th Ground Combat Training Squadron (99 GCTS). At Silver Flag Alpha, Security Forces airmen received mission-specific training prior to being deployed to combat areas. There were two basic courses taught at Silver Flag Alpha; the 17-day Base Security Operations Course which focuses on base defense from within the base boundary and the Area Security Operations Course for airmen whose deployment tasking includes "outside the wire" missions where the airmen leave the base perimeter to conduct various missions. Military Working Dog handlers received additional training along with attending one of the two Silver Flag Alpha courses. Depending on the course the airmen may have received training on the following:

- Vehicles: uparmored Humvees, MRAPs, MATVs. Which may or may not be equipped with the CROWS system for remotely operating mounted weapons such as the M2, M-240 or Mk 19 grenade launcher.
- Tactical Automated Sensor Systems, for base perimeter sensor systems.
- Heavy weapons qualifications courses for the M2 Mk 19 and M107
- Non-lethal weapons: shotgun/grenade launcher/hand grenade rounds; expandable baton; taser; and glare mout lasers.

Silver Flag Alpha's range complex included 12 small arms ranges, a Military Operations in Urban Terrain (MOUT) village, a bare base tent city, convoy combat training route, and a vehicle maneuver area.

Silver Flag Alpha was closed on Dec. 20, 2014 when the course was transferred to Desert Defender at Ft Bliss, TX.

== Based units ==
Flying and notable non-flying units based at Creech Air Force Base.

Units marked GSU are Geographically Separate Units, which although based at Creech, are subordinate to a parent unit based at another location.

=== United States Air Force ===
Air Combat Command (ACC)

- Fifteenth Air Force
  - 432nd Wing / 432nd Air Expeditionary Wing
    - Headquarters 432nd Wing
    - 432nd Operations Group
      - 11th Attack Squadron – MQ-9A Reaper
      - 30th Reconnaissance Squadron – RQ-170A Sentinel
      - 44th Reconnaissance Squadron – RQ-170A Sentinel
      - 432nd Operations Support Squadron
      - 489th Attack Squadron – MQ-9A Reaper
    - 432d Maintenance Group
      - 432d Aircraft Communications Maintenance Squadron
      - 432d Aircraft Maintenance Squadron
      - 432d Maintenance Squadron
    - 432nd Mission Support Group
      - 432nd Security Forces Squadron
      - 432nd Support Squadron
    - 732nd Operations Group
      - 15th Attack Squadron – MQ-9A Reaper
      - 17th Attack Squadron – MQ-9A Reaper
      - 22nd Attack Squadron – MQ-9A Reaper
      - 732nd Operations Support Squadron
      - 867th Attack Squadron – MQ-9A Reaper
    - 25th Attack Group
      - 42nd Attack Squadron (dormant)
- US Air Force Warfare Center
  - 53rd Wing
    - 53rd Test and Evaluation Group
      - 556th Test and Evaluation Squadron (GSU) – MQ-1B Predator and MQ-9A Reaper
  - 57th Wing
    - US Air Force Weapons School
      - 26th Weapons Squadron (GSU) – MQ-9A Reaper

Air Force Reserve Command (AFRC)

- Tenth Air Force
  - 926th Wing
    - 726th Operations Group
      - 78th Attack Squadron (GSU) – MQ-9A Reaper
      - 91st Attack Squadron (GSU) – MQ-9A Reaper

=== Joint units ===
- Joint Unmanned Aircraft Systems Center of Excellence

=== Royal Air Force ===
No. 1 Group (Air Combat) RAF

- No. 39 Squadron – MQ-9A Reaper

== In popular culture ==
Author Stephen King presented the site as the base of military operations for the antagonist, in his novel The Stand. Creech was the site for the control of drone surveillance and Hellfire missile deployment in the 2015 film Eye in the Sky.

It was also briefly seen in London Has Fallen, being the base of a drone strike in Pakistan during the prologue, supposedly killing the antagonist and his family. It is also hinted to be the base of another drone strike in Yemen, this time successfully killing the antagonist.

In 2018, it appeared as a location for launching drone strikes in the third episode of the first season of Tom Clancy's Jack Ryan.

== See also ==
- List of United States Air Force installations
- Nevada World War II Army airfields
