= Black Canyon Wilderness (Nevada) =

Protected area in the United States

- IUCN category Ib (wilderness area)
- Location: Clark County, Nevada, United States
- Nearest city: Boulder
- Coordinates: 35°54′N 114°43′W
- Area: 17,220 acres (6,970 ha)
- Established: November 6, 2002
- Governing body: National Park Service

The Black Canyon Wilderness in the state of Nevada is a 17,220-acre (6,970 ha) wilderness area located in the Dry Lake Watershed along Dry Lake Valley at Black Canyon of the Colorado, west of the Great Basin Divide. It is part of the Lake Mead National Recreation Area. Immediately to the south is the Eldorado Wilderness, in the El Dorado Mountains. Together, the two wilderness areas protect 49,170 acres (19,900 ha).
