= Area 2 =

Area 2 can refer to:

- Brodmann area 2
- Area 2 (Nevada National Security Site)
