= Joint Unmanned Aircraft Systems Center of Excellence =

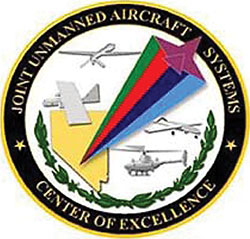
JUAS COE Emblem

The Joint Unmanned Aircraft Systems Center of Excellence (JUAS COE) is a multi service unit of the United States Armed Forces based at Creech Air Force Base in Indian Springs, Nevada. It went operational in 2005.

The Center of Excellence is designed to improve interoperability and use, and examines the use of sensors and intelligence collection assets to meet joint operational requirements of U.S. forces in any combat environment. The COE is an operationally focused organization concentrating on UAV systems technology, joint concepts, training, tactics, and procedural solutions to the warfighters’ needs.

The Army was initially lead the Joint UAV COE with the Air Force as deputy. These positions will rotate among the four military services. The center has representatives from all four military services and other DOD and non-DOD agencies

== History ==
The JUAS COE replaced the Air Force Unmanned Aerial Vehicle Center of Excellence at Creech.

The Joint COE stood up at Creech AFB in 2005.
