= Nevada World War II Army airfields =

Nevada World War II Army Airfields
- Part of United States Army

Site information
- Type: Army airfields

Location
- Nevada World War II Army airfields (Nevada)

Site history
- Built: 1940–1944
- In use: 1940–present

During World War II, the United States Army Air Forces (USAAF) established numerous airfields in Nevada for training pilots and aircrews of USAAF fighters and bombers.

Most of these airfields were under the command of Fourth Air Force or the Army Air Forces Training Command (AAFTC). However other USAAF commands (Air Technical Service Command (ATSC); and Air Transport Command (ATC) or Troop Carrier Command) had airfields in support roles.

It is still possible to find remnants of these wartime airfields. Many were converted into municipal airports (such as Derby Field, near Lovelock), some were returned to agriculture or simply abandoned to decay and return to desert, and several were retained as United States Air Force installations and were front-line bases during the Cold War. Hundreds of the temporary buildings that were used survive today, and are being used for other purposes.

== Major airfields ==
Army Air Forces Training Command
Western Flight Training Command

- Las Vegas AAF, Las Vegas

AAC Gunnery School, 1941
AAF West Coast Training Center
70th Army Air Force Base Unit
Now: Nellis Air Force Base

Indian Springs Airport, Indian Springs
Sub-base of Las Vegas AAF
Was: Indian Springs Air Force Base (1951–1961)
Was: Indian Springs Air Force Auxiliary Field (1961–2005)
Now: Creech Air Force Base (2005–present)

Air Technical Service Command

- Reno AAB, Reno

Part of Sacramento Air Service Command
381st Army Air Force Base Unit
Later Stead Air Force Base (Air Training Command base, closed 1966)
Now: Reno Stead Airport (FAA LID: 4SD)

Fourth Air Force

- Tonopah Bombing Range/AAF, Tonopah

413th Army Air Force Base Unit
Now: Tonopah Airport (IATA: TPH, ICAO: KTPH)
John J Pogchampus Airfield

== Map of airfields ==
WWII Nevada military sites included Army Airfields (red) such as Las Vegas AAF (airplane symbol) and Army/Navy ranges (black) such as Aerial Gunnery Range No. 4, Pyramid Torpedo Dropping Range, and the Lovelock Aerial Gunnery Range (yellow indicates Indian Springs auxiliary fields).
