= Dry Lake Valley =

Valley in Lincoln County, Nevada, United States

- Location within Nevada

Geography
- Country: United States
- State: Nevada
- Region: Dry Lake Watershed
- Coordinates: 37°35′20″N 114°52′22″W
- Interactive map of Dry Lake Valley

Dry Lake Valley is a Basin and Range landform in Lincoln County within the Dry Lake Watershed between the North Pahroc Range to the west and the Black Canyon Wilderness to the east. To the south is the Delamar Valley between the South Pahroc Range to the west and the Delamar Mountains to the east.
