= Tactical Automated Security System =

US Air Force security system

TASS Desert Logo

The Tactical Automated Security System (TASS) is a U.S. Air Force intrusion detection and surveillance system used for security monitoring around fixed site airbases, semi-permanent Forward Operating Bases (FOBs), and other mobile tactical deployments.

The system consists of thermal imagers, sensors, communications, power and annunciation components. The system provides for wide-area and perimeter intrusion detection, assessment, and surveillance via both hardwire and UHF/VHF communications.

Sensor technologies within TASS include wide-area and short range radar, microwave, thermal, active and passive infrared, seismic, magnetic, and trip-wire. New sensor types are always being evaluated for future introduction. For fixed and semi-permanent site installations, delay/denial capabilities may also be used within TASS such as fence sensors and various barrier technologies. TASS users can receive sensor alerts via hand-held (roving patrol) devices and/or map based PC annunciators known as Sector Command Posts (SCPs), which can also communicate events to a centralized Base defense operations center (BDOC).

TASS operators can employ a variety of camera systems such as CCTV and high tech military cameras such as Wide-Area Surveillance Thermal Imagers (WSTI) and Long Range Thermal Imagers (LRTIs) which detect enemy movement by tracking body heat or other heat resonances. Such thermal devices can operate in total darkness while still displaying a daylight like image to the operator. Camera devices can be programmatically linked to automatically slew to a target's location upon sensor activation which provides for near real-time assessment.

TASS communications is via RF and/or hardwire, depending on the TASS element being considered. Microwave links are also used for long distance communications with outlying devices such as the WSTI, LRTI and RADAR equipment.

For tactical deployments, the system is designed to be packed into specialized containers of varying sizes that support differing levels of capability. This allows for efficient movement of equipment by aircraft to designated locations while delivering just the right amount of equipment required. Once arrived, containers are unpacked quickly providing for fast system set up. For a pure tactical footprint, the entire system can be set up without any specialized tools (a hard requirement for TASS).

Prior to introduction into the current baseline, new TASS components are rigorously tested by specially trained test squadrons operating from Eglin AFB, FL. Inclusion of new equipment undergoes a lengthy and involved process to determine requirements compliance, mission suitability, and interoperability/interchangeability with current baseline elements. Equipment must meet rigid military environmental requirements, including extreme temperatures, EMI/EMR, drop/shock, and Mean Time Before Failure (MTBF) minimums. Many devices fail to meet one or more TASS standards and thus do not get employed which is a constant frustration for vendors attempting to gain access to the TASS market.

TASS has evolved and has been refined for more than a decade allowing for major additions and improvements in equipment functionality, reliability, and operational availability. TASS has been and continues to be used very effectively in Iraq and Afghanistan where early detection of insurgents is critical to personnel and material survivability.
