= Tikaboo Valley =

Valley in Lincoln County, Nevada, United States

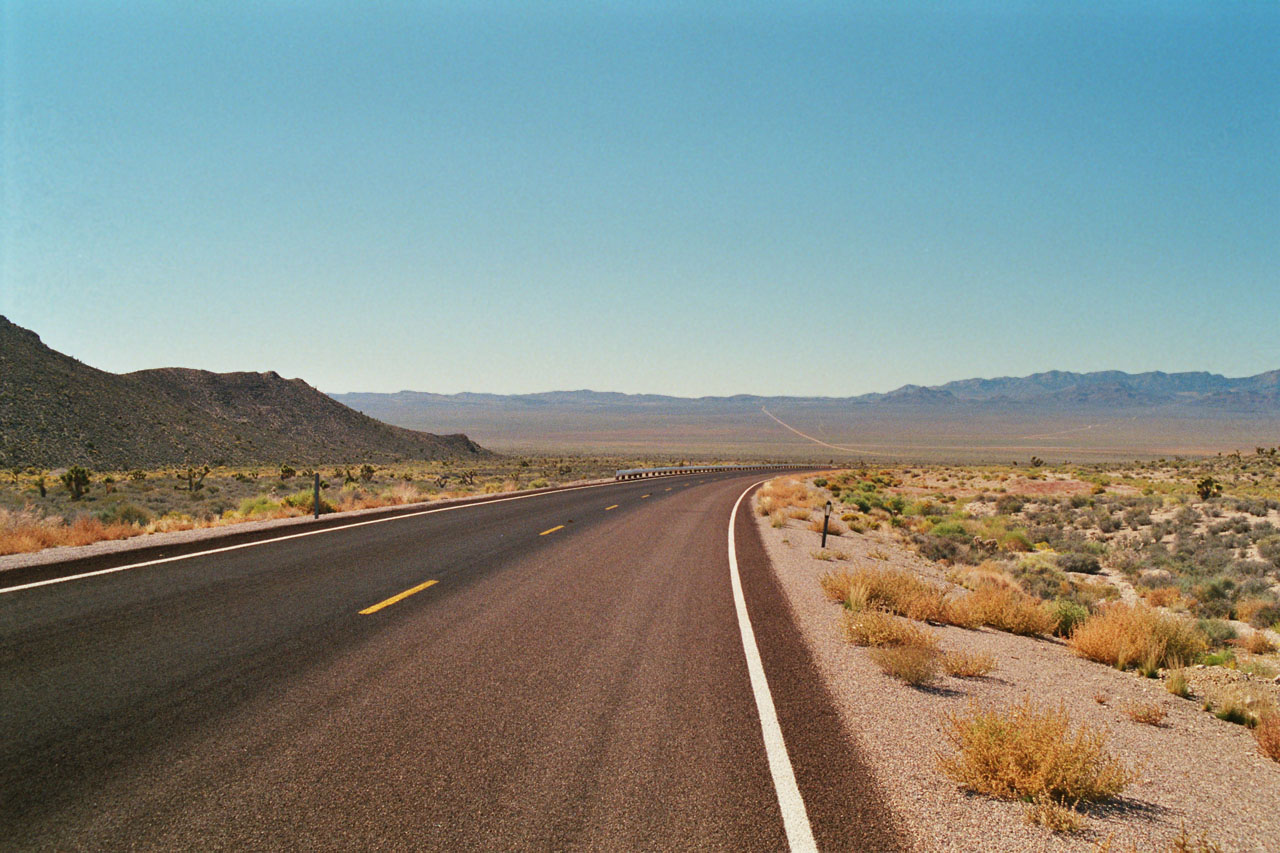
View along State Route 375 in the Tikaboo Valley, October 1997

Tikaboo Valley is a valley in Lincoln County, Nevada, United States. Its geographical coordinates are 37.1563494 and -115.4016881. It has an elevation of 3,793 feet or 1,156 meters.

== Climate ==
The climate there is dry, even on cool mornings after a rainfall.

== Fauna ==
Biologist Chris Smith has studied flora and fauna in the area including Joshua trees and moths. It appears that this may be the only place where two types of Joshua tree, namely the Eastern and Western varieties have come together. Part of the reason for this is the possibility of Climate change which could account for the northward appearance of a hybridized species.

== Military use ==
B-52H and B-1B Bombers often do low-level runs there. There have been other military tests there.

== See also ==
- List of valleys of Nevada
