= Delamar Valley =

Valley in Nevada, United States

Coordinates: 37°16′24″N 114°56′56″W

Panorama of Delamar Valley in October, 2026

Delamar Valley is one of the central Nevada desert basins and the southern portion of the Dry Lake Watershed, including a low point on the serpentine section of the Great Basin Divide in Nevada.
