= Pahute Mesa Airstrip =

Coordinates: 37°06′10″N 116°18′48″W

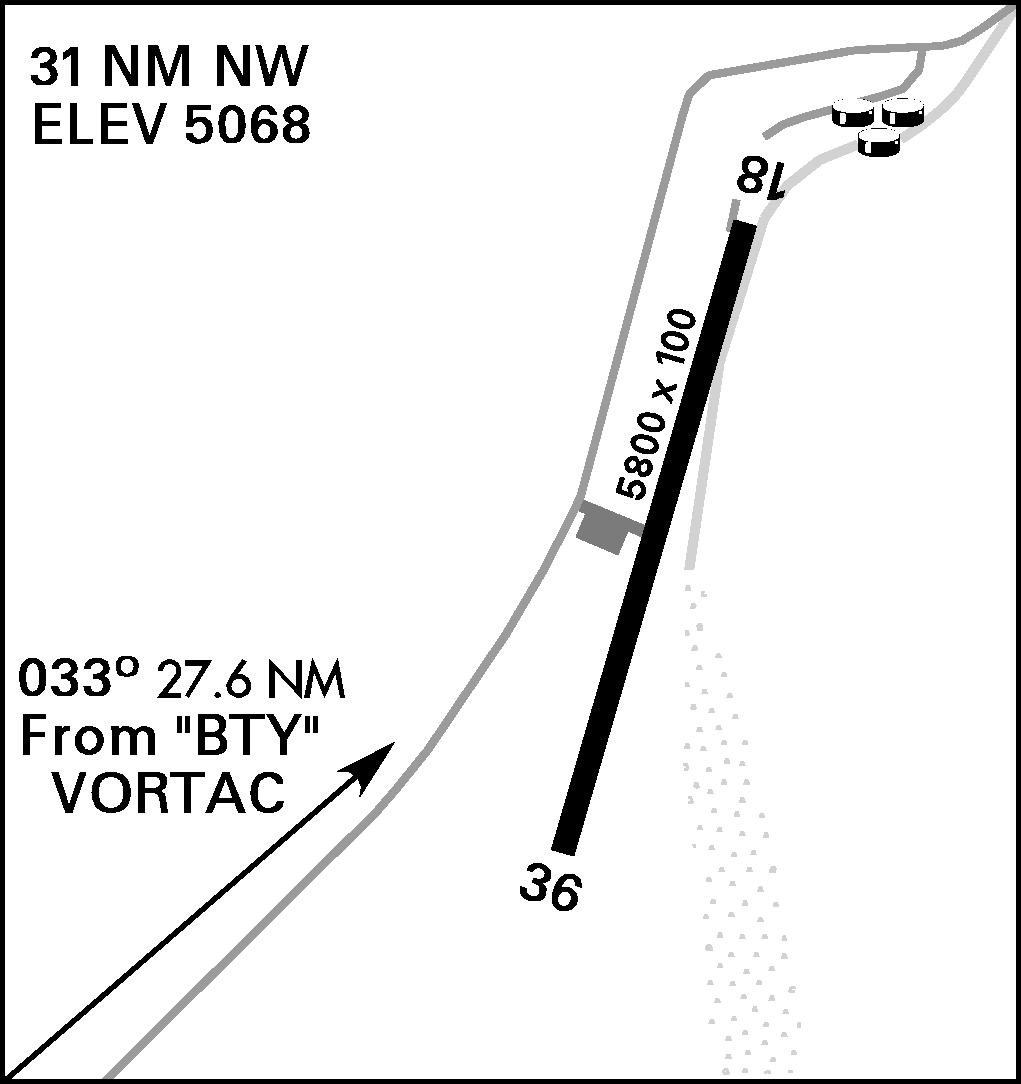
- IATA: none; ICAO: none; FAA LID: L23

Summary
- Airport type: Private
- Operator: United States Department of Energy/Nevada
- Location: Mercury, Nevada
- Elevation AMSL: 5,068 ft / 1,545 m
- Interactive map of Pahute Mesa Airstrip

Runways
Direction	Length		Surface
Direction	ft	m	Surface
18/36	5,800	1,768	Asphalt
- Source: Federal Aviation Administration

Pahute Mesa Airstrip (FAA LID: L23) is a private-use airport located 31 miles (50 km) northwest of the central business district of Mercury, in Nye County, Nevada, United States. The airport is owned by the United States Department of Energy.

== History ==
Originally built in 1941 as an emergency landing strip for Army Air Corps fighters, the airstrip was expanded in 1968 to allow transport aircraft to bring test materials and supplies to projects at Areas 19 and 20. Permission to land must be obtained in advance from the US Department of Energy.

== Facilities ==
Pahute Mesa Airstrip covers an area of 35 acres (14 ha) which contains one asphalt paved runway designated 18/36 and measuring 5,800 by 100 feet (1,768 m × 30 m). The runway had numbers with both ends, but it is now marked with "X" on either end.

A small ramp area allows planes and helicopters to park at the airstrip. Beside three small hangars, there are no other permanent structures at the airstrip.
