= Area 2 (Nevada National Security Site) =

Site of 14 nuclear weapons tests

Coordinates: 37.13796°N 116.07353°W

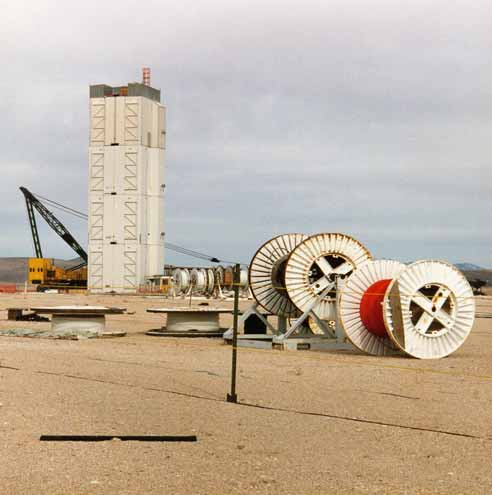
Tower of the Gabbs test

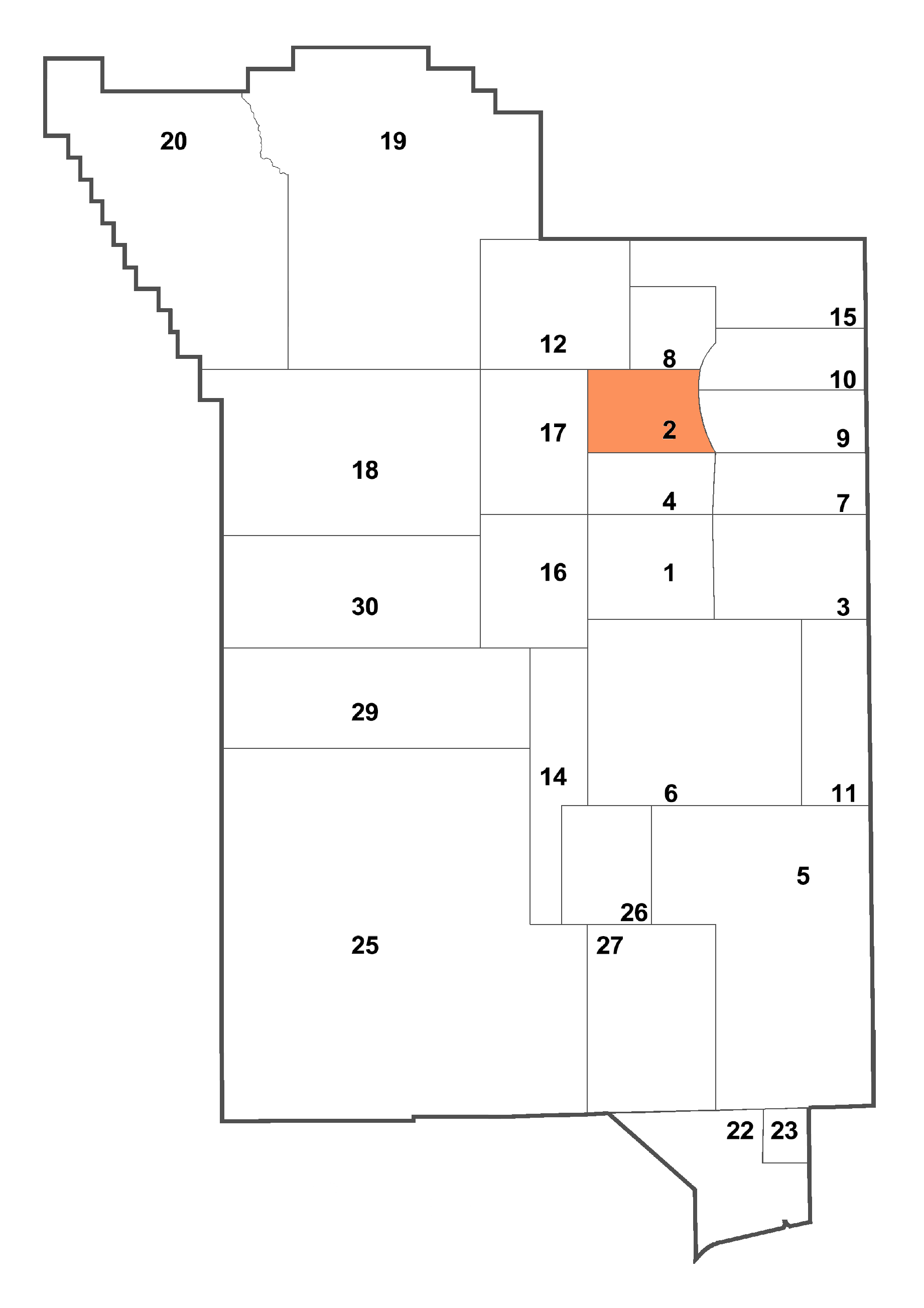
Area 2 within the Nevada Test Site.

Area 2 is a division of the Nevada Test Site in the Mojave Desert. The area is located 18 miles south-west of Area 51 in the Yucca Flat.

== History ==
Testing began in July 1946 and was conducted intermittently until 31 October 1958, when President Eisenhower signed a moratorium with the former Soviet Union to stop testing. On 15 September 1961, testing at the Nevada Test Site resumed on a year-round basis. The Nevada Test Site is made up of 18 sites.

On 25 May 1953, Grable was fired from a 280mm gun and produced a yield of 15 kilotons. Priscilla which produced a yield of 37 kilotons, was detonated on 24 June 1957. The Sedan Crater at Area 2 was created when a 104 kiloton explosive was fired on 6 July 1962.

Area 2 was the site of 144 tests comprising 169 detonations. Shot "Gabbs" a detonation test, was intended for early 1993 but was cancelled in 1992 due to a pre-emptive stop of testing based around the Comprehensive Nuclear-Test-Ban Treaty.

The Nevada National Security Site provides historical tours yearly, which include visits to various locations on the site including the Area 2 Gun Turret.
