= Tonopah Airport =

Public-use airport in Nye County, Nevada, US

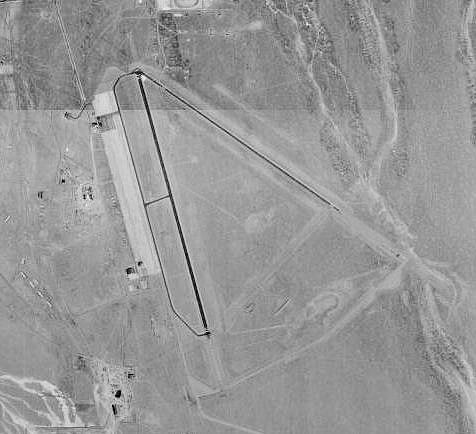
- USGS aerial image, 1999
- IATA: TPH; ICAO: KTPH; FAA LID: TPH

Summary
- Airport type: Public
- Owner: Nye County
- Serves: Tonopah, Nevada
- Elevation AMSL: 5,430 ft / 1,655 m
- Coordinates: 38°03′37″N 117°05′12″W
- Interactive map of Tonopah Airport

Runways
Direction	Length		Surface
Direction	ft	m	Surface
15/33	7,160	2,183	Asphalt
11/29	5,660	1,725	Asphalt

Statistics (2022)
- Aircraft operations (year ending 5/18/2022): 7,002
- Based aircraft: 7
- Source: Federal Aviation Administration

Tonopah Airport (IATA: TPH, ICAO: KTPH, FAA LID: TPH) is a county-owned, public-use airport located seven nautical miles (13 km) east of the central business district of Tonopah, in Nye County, Nevada, United States.

It incorporates the former Tonopah Army Airfield, a World War II installation where many units of the USAAF, such as the 357th Fighter Group, trained. The 357th (whose pilots included Chuck Yeager and Bud Anderson among others) later flew P-51 Mustang fighters against the German Luftwaffe, from their base at Leiston, on the south-eastern coast of Britain.

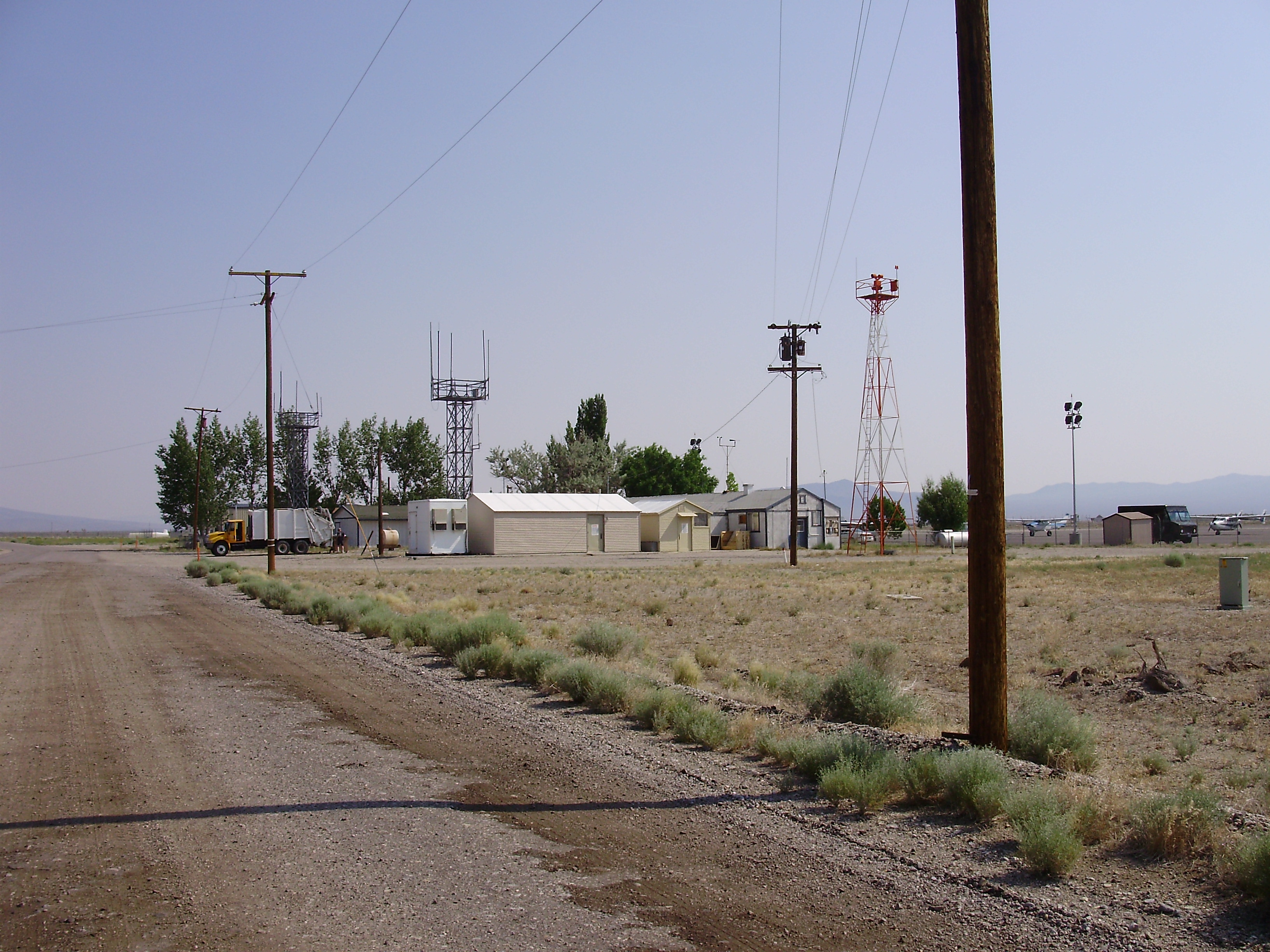
Tonopah Airport

== Facilities and aircraft ==
Tonopah Airport covers an area of 3,820 acres (1,550 ha) at an elevation of 5,430 feet (1,655 m) above mean sea level. It has two asphalt paved runways: 15/33 is 7,160 by 80 feet (2,182 x 23 m) and 11/29 is 5,660 by 50 feet (1,725 x 15 m).

For the 12-month period ending May 18, 2022, the airport had 7,002 aircraft operations, an average of 134 per week: 68% general aviation, 26% air taxi, and 6% military. At that time seven aircraft were based here: 5 single-engine, 1 muli-engine, and 1 helicopter.

== See also ==
- List of airports in Nevada
