= Indian Springs, Nevada =

Unincorporated town in the State of Nevada, United States

Indian Springs
- Unincorporated community
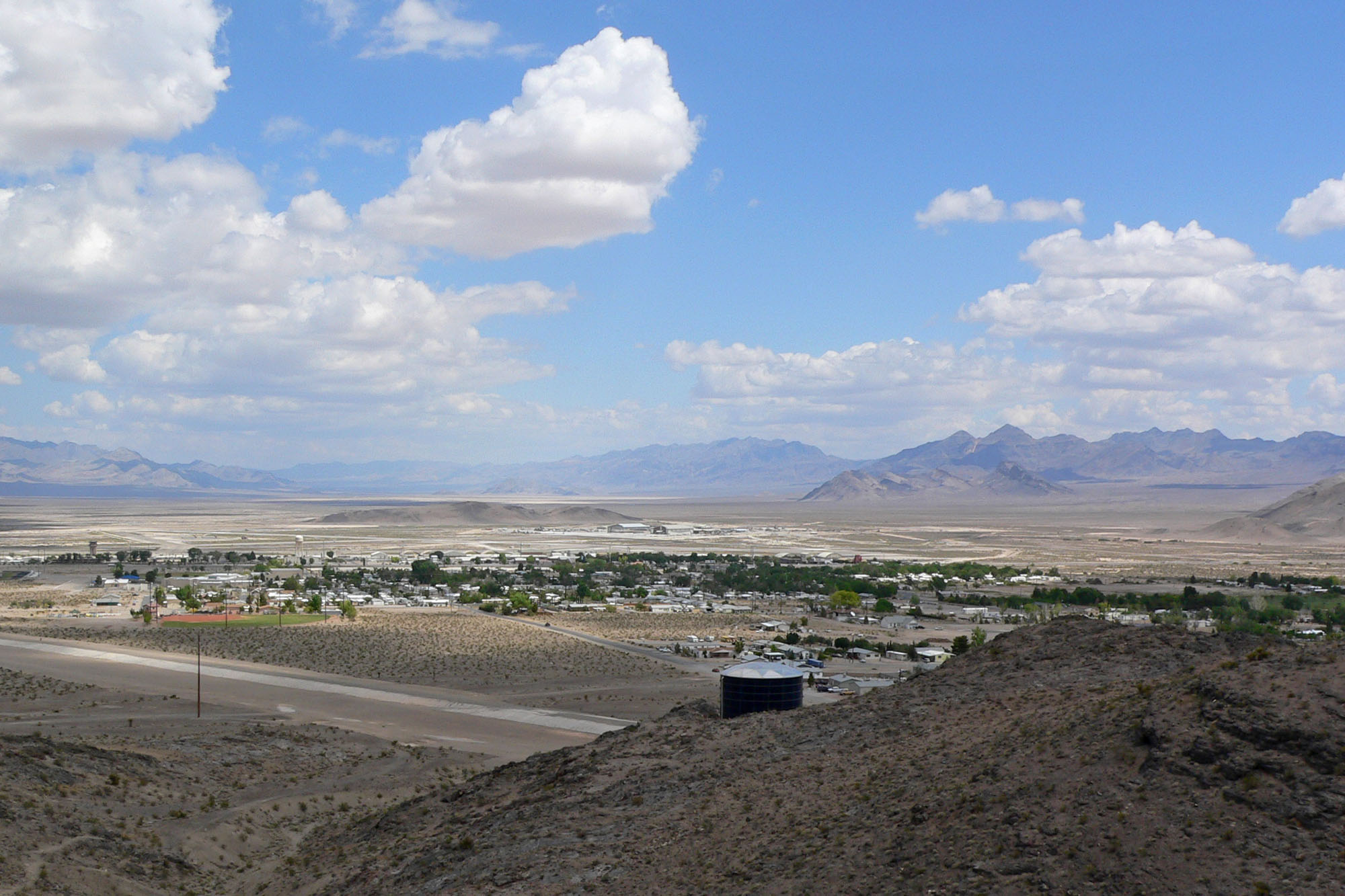

- Location of Indian Springs in Clark County, Nevada

- Location in the United States
- Coordinates: 36°34′18″N 115°40′38″W
- Country: United States
- State: Nevada
- County: Clark
- Founded: 1906; 120 years ago
- Named for: Native Americans and Spring

Area
  - Total: 18.04 sq mi (46.72 km^{2})
  - Land: 18.04 sq mi (46.72 km^{2})
  - Water: 0 sq mi (0.00 km^{2})
- Elevation: 3,169 ft (966 m)

Population (2020)
  - Total: 912
  - Density: 50.6/sq mi (19.52/km^{2})
- Time zone: UTC-8 (PST)
  - Summer (DST): UTC-7 (PDT)
- ZIP code: 89018
- Area codes: 702 and 725
- FIPS code: 32-35300
- GNIS feature ID: 0847373
- Website: Indian Springs Town Advisory Board

Indian Springs is an unincorporated town and a census-designated place located on U.S. Route 95 next to Creech Air Force Base in northwestern Clark County and southern Nevada.

The population was 912 at the 2020 census.

== History ==
The community was named for the fact that Native Americans had settled on the springs near the original town site.

In 1906, Indian Springs became a way station and watering place for the Las Vegas and Tonopah Railroad. The original rail line ran under what is now US 95. The LV&T ceased operation in 1918.

=== Army Air Forces to Air Force Base ===
Indian Springs Auxiliary Airfield also known as Indian Springs Field, was rapidly constructed in Nevada by the United States Army Air Forces the month after the Pearl Harbor attack. Indian Springs was immediately entered into service as a training camp for Army Air Force B-25 air-to-air gunnery training, and as a divert field for Las Vegas Army Airfield.

In 1947, Las Vegas AAF was inactivated, and so was Indian Springs.

One year later, Indian Springs was reactivated as Indian Springs Air Force Base by the new United States Air Force, with a new role as a new weapons systems and aircraft research and testing. Among these missions were support for nuclear arms testing at the Nevada Proving Grounds, high-altitude balloon search and retrieval, new gunnery and rocketry systems, and testing of experimental aircraft. For a period of the 1950s and 1960s Indian Springs AFB housed some of the most advanced aircraft and air weapons systems in the world.

In the 1960s, Indian Springs AFB was transferred to the Tactical Air Wing and re-designated as Indian Springs Air Force Auxiliary Field. The Indian Springs mission was focused on monitoring of Nellis range, and became the remote training site of the USAF Thunderbirds elite air demonstration squadron. The 1982 "Diamond Crash" caused the deaths of four Thunderbird pilots and hastened their transition from the T-38A Talon to the F-16C Fighting Falcon.

From 1985-87, Indian Springs was home to a helicopter squadron of the 554th Operations Support Wing.

==== Creech Air Force Base ====
Indian Springs Air Force Auxiliary Field was renamed Creech Air Force Base in 2005, in honor of General Wilbur L. "Bill" Creech, a former commander of the Tactical Air Command. Also in the 2000s, Creech AFB began to host the 432d Wing and 432d Air Expeditionary Wing, operating/flying unmanned aerial vehicles, and returning the base to its history as a base of advanced special aircraft development.

The base also hosts the operations of the 556th Test and Evaluation Squadron and 99th Ground Combat Training Squadron, The National Desert Warfare Center, and those of the Air Force Reserve's 78th Reconnaissance Squadron, 91st RS, and Nevada Air National Guard's 232nd Operations Squadron.

=== "Wild Bill" Williams ===
George and Belle Lattimer owned a ranch where the Indian Springs Hotel & Casino was located until October 1, 2014 when it was closed by the USAF to expand a security buffer around Creech AFB. In 1906, George Lattimer was bitten by an insect, or perhaps a brown recluse spider, and Belle hitched the wagon to take him into the doctor. A 16-year-old Paiute Indian boy named Coachie Siegmuller was left to watch the ranch.

While they were gone, Siegmuller saw another Paiute named Bill "Wild Bill" Williams approached the ranch. Williams was known as "bad" and Siegmuller was terrified of him. Williams was notorious for exploiting young Paiute men by hiring them out to local ranchers and then pocketing their wages. Williams was there that day to collect some of these wages. Finding no one home, Williams stretched out on the porch and was soon fast asleep. Siegmuller felt he needed to defend the ranch, fetched a rifle from the kitchen, silently crept up on Williams, and shot him dead in the head.

Coachie Siegmuller pleaded guilty to the murder and was sentenced to death. The area's Paiute Reservation, the Las Vegas Indian Colony, threatened to go to war over the death penalty, and to keep the peace Siegmuller was instead sentenced to three years in the Carson City Prison. The Lattimers buried Wild Bill Williams behind the ranch. Dogs kept digging his remains up, so they were buried a few times before staying under.

== Demographics ==
Historical population
Census	Pop.	Note	%±
2000	1,302		—
2010	991		−23.9%
2020	912		−8.0%
U.S. Decennial Census

As of the census of 2000, there were 1,302 people, 526 households, and 341 families residing in the census designated place (CDP). The population density was 68.4 inhabitants per square mile (26.4/km^{2}). There were 657 housing units at an average density of 34.5 per square mile (13.3/km^{2}). The racial makeup of the CDP was 88.02% White, 1.15% African American, 2.00% Native American, 1.15% Asian, 0.84% Pacific Islander, 4.22% from other races, and 2.61% from two or more races. Hispanic or Latino of any race were 6.84% of the population.

There were 526 households, out of which 32.1% had children under the age of 18 living with them, 44.3% were married couples living together, 13.1% had a female householder with no husband present, and 35.0% were non-families. 30.2% of all households were made up of individuals, and 9.3% had someone living alone who was 65 years of age or older. The average household size was 2.48 and the average family size was 3.05.

In the CDP the population was spread out, with 29.0% under the age of 18, 8.5% from 18 to 24, 23.4% from 25 to 44, 28.0% from 45 to 64, and 11.1% who were 65 years of age or older. The median age was 37 years. For every 100 females, there were 105.0 males. For every 100 females age 18 and over, there were 108.3 males.

The median income for a household in the CDP was $40,966, and the median income for a family was $40,608. Males had a median income of $35,609 versus $24,286 for females. The per capita income for the CDP was $14,687. About 7.2% of families and 10.7% of the population were below the poverty line, including 13.2% of those under age 18 and 13.5% of those age 65 or over.

== Education ==
Indian Springs has a public library, a branch of the Las Vegas-Clark County Library District.

== Climate ==
Indian Springs experiences a desert climate, typical of southern Nevada. Precipitation is rare throughout the year, and summers are hot, although very low humidity helps temper the effects of the heat. Indian Springs' climate is similar to that of nearby Las Vegas, but with some significant differences. Nighttime temperatures at Indian Springs are much cooler than those in Las Vegas. This is due both to Indian Springs' higher elevation, and the lack of the Urban heat island effect that prevents temperatures in Las Vegas from falling quickly after dark.

Climate data for Indian Springs, Nevada. (data from 1913–2012)
Month	Jan	Feb	Mar	Apr	May	Jun	Jul	Aug	Sep	Oct	Nov	Dec	Year
Record high °F (°C)	78 (26)	82 (28)	90 (32)	97 (36)	108 (42)	118 (48)	116 (47)	114 (46)	117 (47)	100 (38)	86 (30)	83 (28)	118 (48)
Mean daily maximum °F (°C)	55.3 (12.9)	60.7 (15.9)	68.0 (20.0)	78.0 (25.6)	87.7 (30.9)	97.1 (36.2)	103.1 (39.5)	101.2 (38.4)	95.1 (35.1)	81.1 (27.3)	66.1 (18.9)	57.9 (14.4)	79.3 (26.3)
Mean daily minimum °F (°C)	23.1 (−4.9)	27.8 (−2.3)	32.7 (0.4)	42.0 (5.6)	49.8 (9.9)	57.2 (14.0)	63.4 (17.4)	61.4 (16.3)	52.8 (11.6)	41.4 (5.2)	29.4 (−1.4)	24.2 (−4.3)	42.1 (5.6)
Record low °F (°C)	−5 (−21)	3 (−16)	13 (−11)	21 (−6)	26 (−3)	38 (3)	49 (9)	40 (4)	31 (−1)	21 (−6)	8 (−13)	2 (−17)	−5 (−21)
Average precipitation inches (mm)	0.36 (9.1)	0.27 (6.9)	0.26 (6.6)	0.33 (8.4)	0.12 (3.0)	0.11 (2.8)	0.43 (11)	0.29 (7.4)	0.28 (7.1)	0.25 (6.4)	0.31 (7.9)	0.28 (7.1)	3.29 (84)
Average snowfall inches (cm)	1.5 (3.8)	0.2 (0.51)	0.4 (1.0)	0.1 (0.25)	0 (0)	0 (0)	0 (0)	0 (0)	0 (0)	0 (0)	0.1 (0.25)	0.4 (1.0)	2.7 (6.9)
Source: The Western Regional Climate Center

== See also ==
- Census-designated places in Clark County, Nevada
- Populated places in the Mojave Desert
