= Operation Faust =

Operation Faust may refer to:

- Operations Manna, Chowhound, and Faust, a series of humanitarian missions to get food to starving Dutch civilians at the end of World War II
- an early name of Operation Ranger, an American nuclear bomb test series
