= Target Nevada (film) =

1951 instructional documentary film by the United States Air Force

- Title card
- Narrated by: Carey Wilson
- Cinematography: United States Air Force Air Photographic & Charting Service
- Production company: Lookout Mountain Laboratory
- Distributed by: United States Air Force First Motion Picture Unit, Hollywood, California
- Release date: 1951
- Running time: 13 minutes, 30 seconds
- Country: United States
- Language: English

Target Nevada Special Film Project (S.F.P.) 281 (1951) is an instructional documentary short film produced by United States Air Force (USAF). The film documents the story of the USAF support to the United States Atomic Energy Commission for 1949–1951 continental atom bomb tests. In an era of postwar "atomic scare" films, Target Nevada is a straightforward documentary film on nuclear weapons testing. (Note: A later three-minute black and white newsreel film produced by British Pathé is also named Target Nevada (Aka Atom Bomb Test At Nevada) (1953) that used sequences from the color Target Nevada (1951).)

== Synopsis ==
Target Nevada established that throughout the early history and development of nuclear weapons, scientists at Los Alamos National Laboratory began nuclear weapons testing. Two locations were used, the Pacific Proving Grounds in the Marshall Islands and the Nevada Test Site which ultimately was chosen as the optimal site for reasons of logistics and cost effectiveness.

In the period from 1949–1951, out of the 20 atom bomb tests that were conducted, 14 were via "air drop" by USAF aircraft. The USAF Special Weapons Command led by Major General John S. Mills, operated out of Indian Springs Air Force Base, in conjunction with the United States Atomic Energy commission.

In preparation for each mission, weather reports are carefully analyzed in order to ensure that the nuclear test will not affect commercial air lanes when the "mushroom cloud" is released. Air bursts are also studied by a fleet of over 40 aircraft that collect samples of the air in the drop zone as well as surrounding areas. Data is sent back to the radiological command center. After each flight, all aircraft used in trailing and sampling are washed down to decontaminate the aircraft and return them to service within a 24-hour period.

The USAF also conducts experiments including volunteer flight surgeons evaluating eyewear that will effectively block the brilliant atomic flare. A group of obsolete as well as contemporary USAF aircraft were also assembled near the blast zone to determine the extent of blast damage on aircraft.

One of the benefits in operational training in conjunction with nuclear weapons testing was that the USAF could carry out realistic atomic bombing missions. In each flight, the key crew members aboard: pilot, radar navigator and bombardier share the responsibility for a successful mission and the USAF is better prepared for its role in a nuclear war.

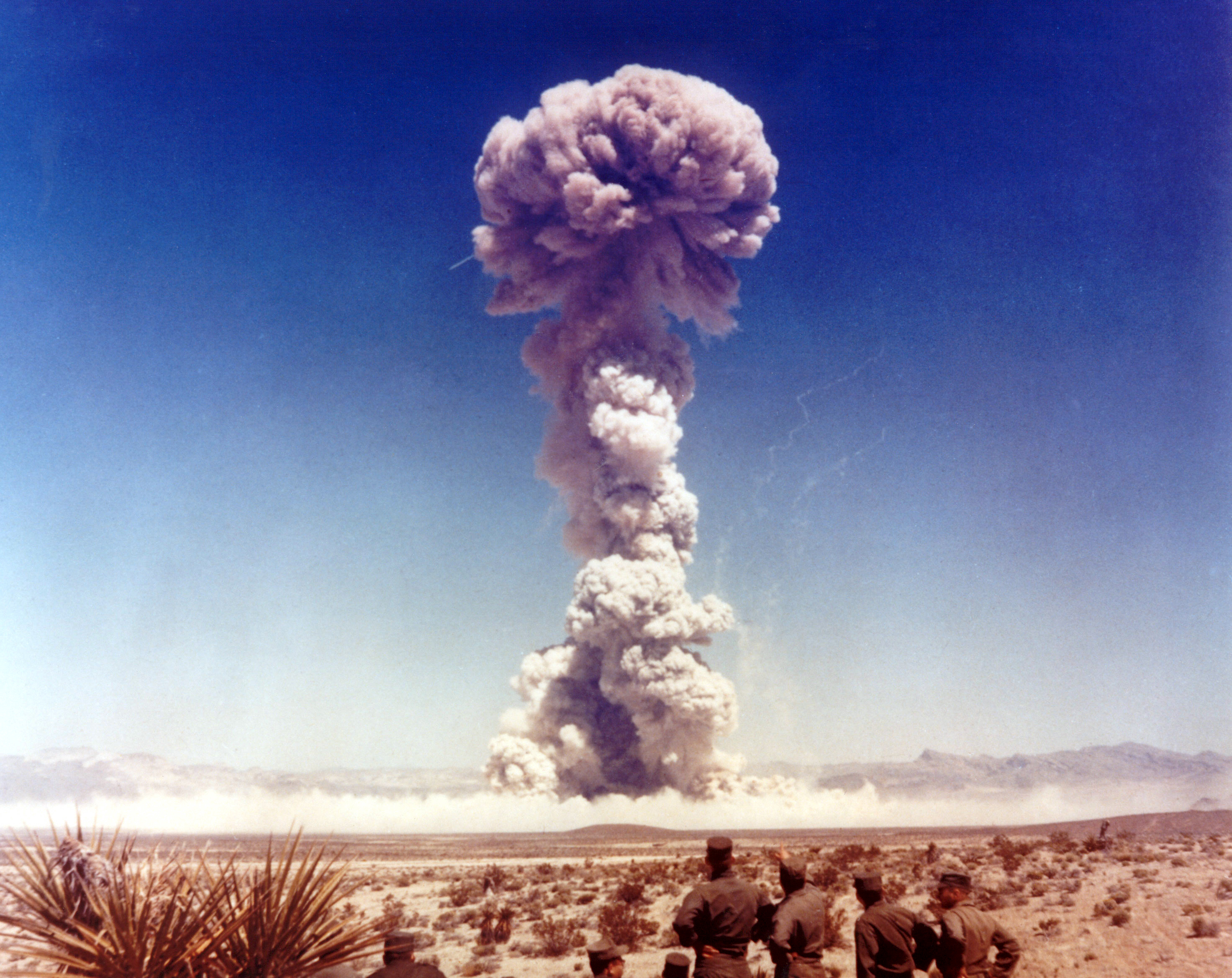
"Buster-Jangle Dog", c. 1951

== Production ==
Target Nevada was produced with the technical assistance and "security guidance" of the United States Department of Defense and the United States Atomic Energy commission. The actual first atmospheric detonation of a 1-kiloton atom bomb is depicted in Target Nevada. It occurred on January 27, 1951, with the airburst of a bomb dropped from 20,000 feet over the desert, on Frenchman Flat, Nevada, by "Rosebud", a Boeing B-50D Superfortress bomber. The dawn test, code named "Ranger Able", part of Operation Ranger, was visible for 50 miles and lit the sky "like the morning sun".

Target Nevada uses footage shown also in Operation Buster-Jangle (1951). Due to the lack of knowledge on the residual effects of exposure to radiation, military personnel and civilian observers were in close proximity to the bomb blasts.

Aircraft seen in Target Nevada include: Boeing B-17 Flying Fortress, Boeing B-29 Superfortress, Boeing B-50 Superfortress, Boeing B-47 Stratojet, Convair B-36, Douglas C-47 Skytrain, Lockheed XF-90, North American B-45 Tornado, North American F-86 Sabre, Republic F-84 Thunderjet, Republic P-47 Thunderbolt and Sikorsky S-52 helicopter.

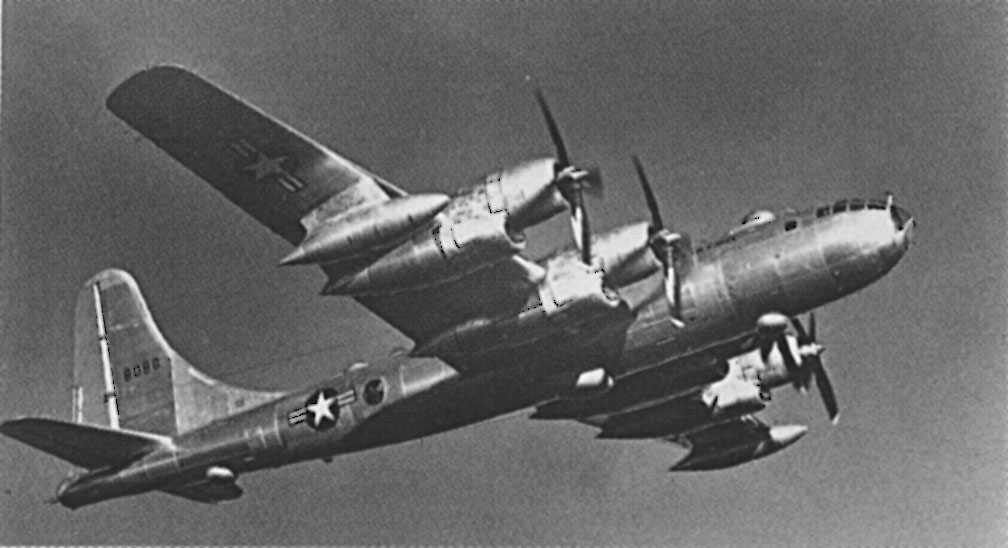
B-50D Superfortress

== Reception ==
Target Nevada was not produced for a theatrical market, but was widely distributed to schools and public institutions. The film was not part of the postwar "atomic scare" films, rather, it could be characterized as an example of "nuclearism", an exaggerated dependence and reliance on nuclear arms.

Other examples of nuclear films that propagated nuclearism included The Big Picture, an American documentary television series which aired from 1951 to 1964. The series consisted of documentary films produced by the United States Army Signal Corps Army Pictorial Service which could be considered propaganda. During one episode, a nuclear blast was described as "... one of the most beautiful sights ever seen by man ..."

Being a USAF production, Target Nevada is in the public domain and is now preserved in many sites including at the Prelinger Archives.

== See also ==
- List of films about nuclear issues – Films discussing the dangers, utilization, and existence of nuclear power and weapons
- List of films in the public domain in the United States
