= Target Nevada =

Target Nevada may refer to:

- Target Nevada (band), a super-group
- Target Nevada (film), a 1951 documentary short film
