= Frenchman Flat =

Hydrographic basin in the Nevada National Security Site

Coordinates: 36.807305°N 115.935379°W

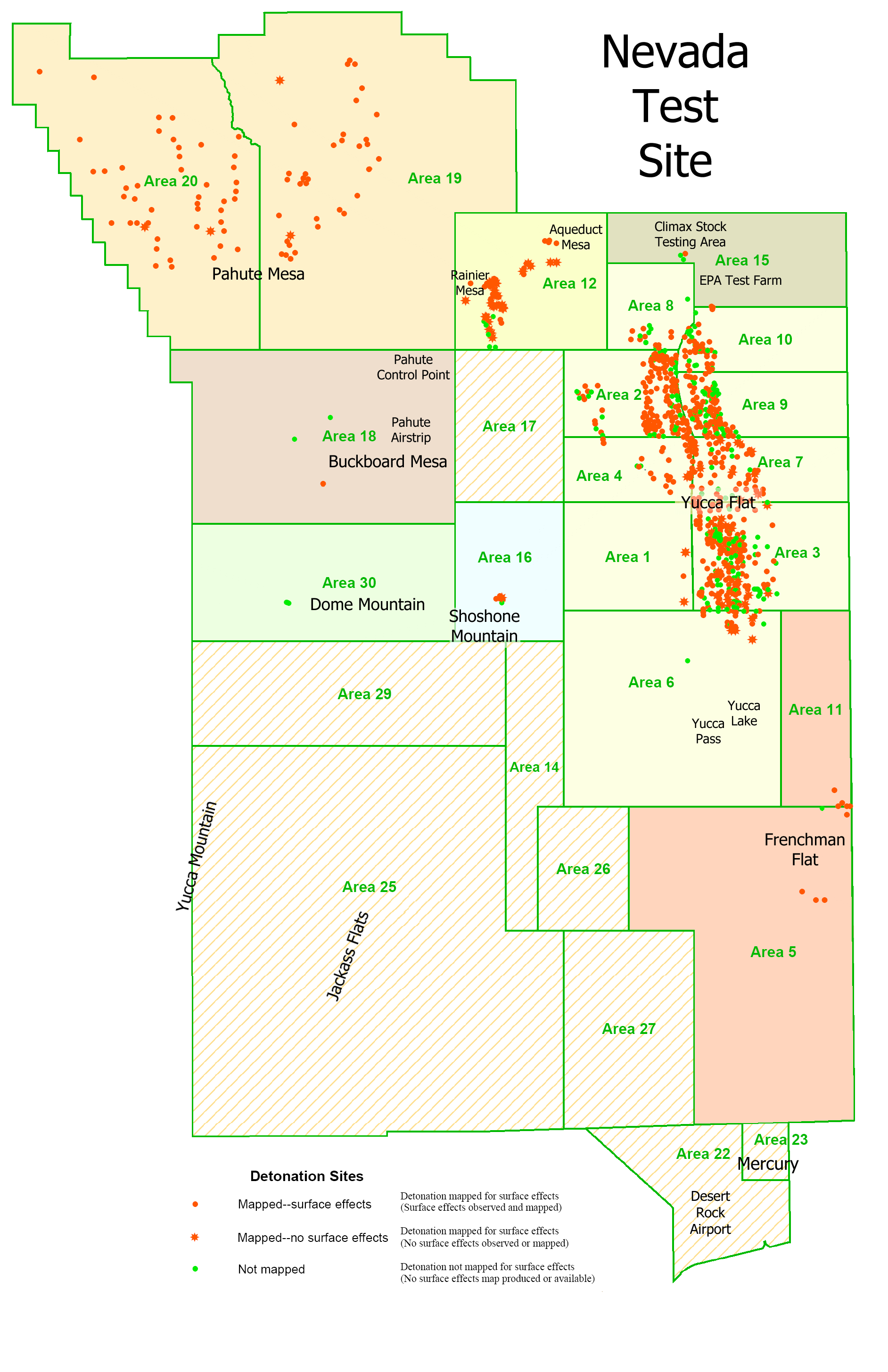
Frenchman Flat spans Area 5 and Area 11 (pink).

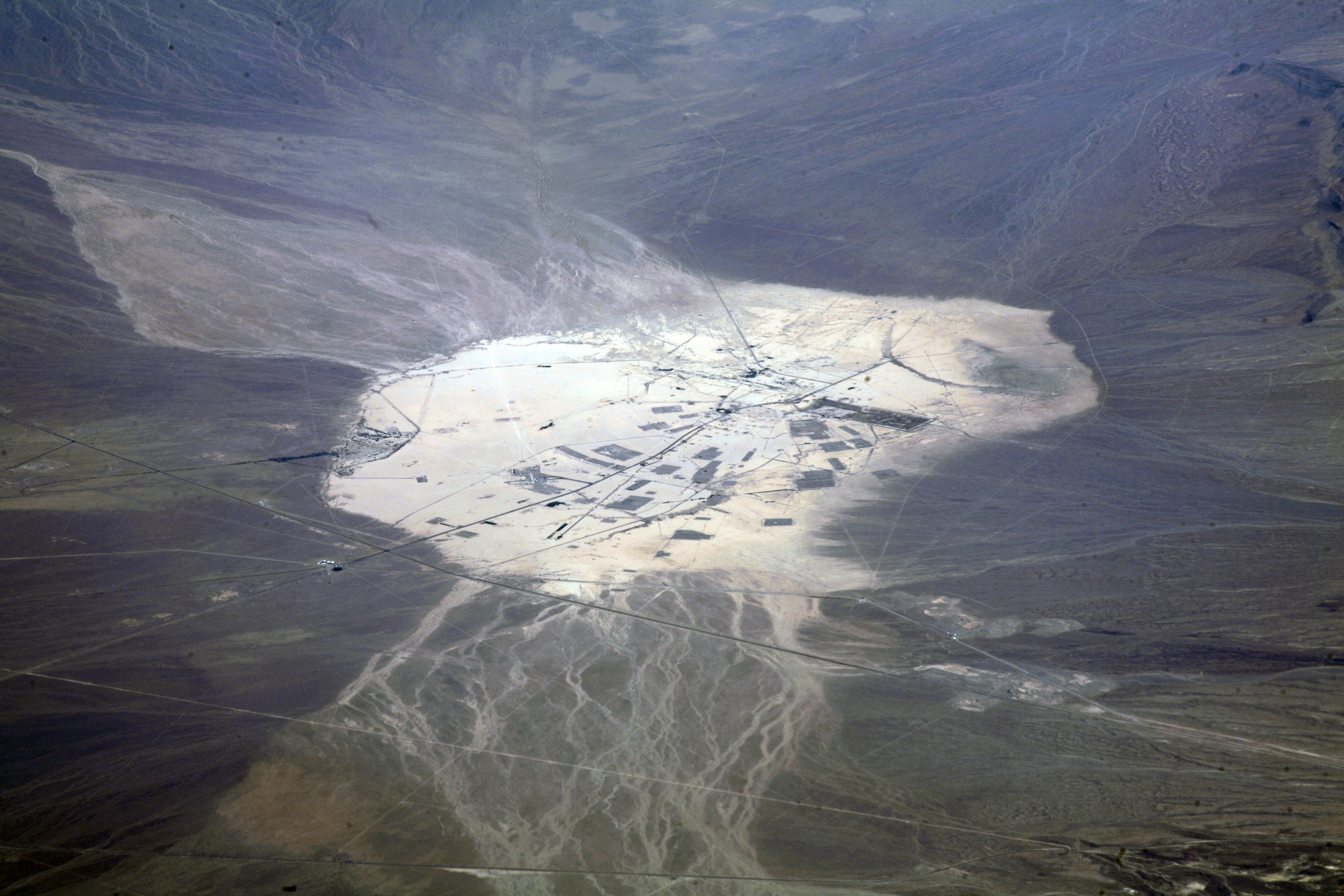
The dry lake of Frenchman Flat

Frenchman Flat is a hydrographic basin in the Nevada National Security Site south of Yucca Flat and north of Mercury, Nevada. The flat was used as an American nuclear test site and has a 5.8 sq mi (15 km^{2}) dry lake bed (Frenchman Lake) that was used as a 1950s airstrip before it was chosen after the start of the Korean War for the Nevada Proving Grounds. Nellis Air Force Base land 12 mi × 30 mi (19 km × 48 km) was transferred to the Atomic Energy Commission on which Site Mercury was constructed on the flat for supporting American nuclear explosive tests. The 1951 Operation Ranger "Able" test (ground zero at UTM Coordinates 923758 on the flat) was the first continental US nuclear detonation after the 1945 Trinity test, and Frenchman Flat also had the only detonation of an American artillery-fired nuclear projectile in the 1953 Upshot-Knothole Grable test using the M65 Atomic Cannon.

== Area 5 ==
Area 5 consists of 95 square miles (250 km^{2}) of the southeastern portion of NTS, north of the town of Mercury, and includes the Area 5 Radioactive Waste Management Site, the Hazardous Waste Storage Unit, and the Spill Test Facility. In the decade 1951–1962, 14 above ground nuclear tests were conducted at Frenchman Flat; several of these atmospheric tests were weapons effects tests. A relatively modest 8-kiloton blast in January 1951 broke storefront windows in Las Vegas.

Tests to determine building damage by nuclear blasts have left remains at the site that are of historical interest. Five underground nuclear weapons were detonated at Frenchman Flat between 1965 and 1968. A carbonate aquifer makes Area 5 not well suited to underground testing, so there were fewer detonations carried out.

=== Waste management ===
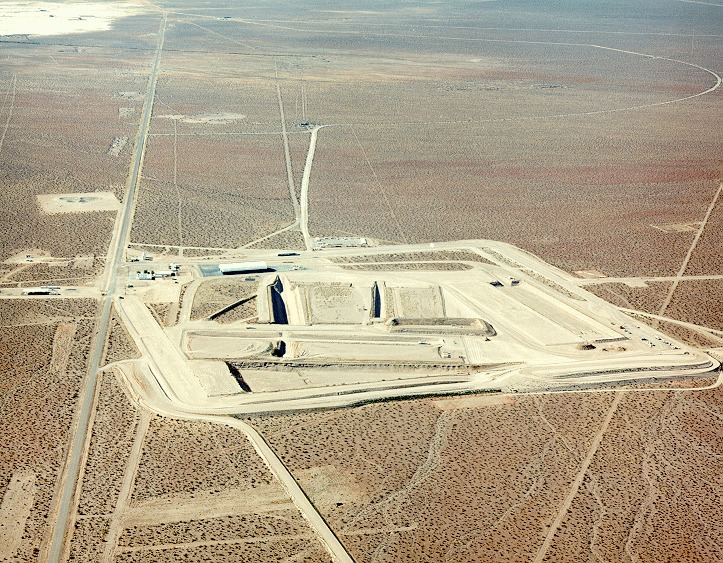
Aerial view of the Area 5 Radioactive Waste Management Site

The Area 5 Radioactive Waste Management Site covers 732 acres (296 ha), a section of desert land used for low-level waste disposal. Mixed waste, including transuranic mixed waste, is stored.

=== Nonproliferation Test and Evaluation Complex ===
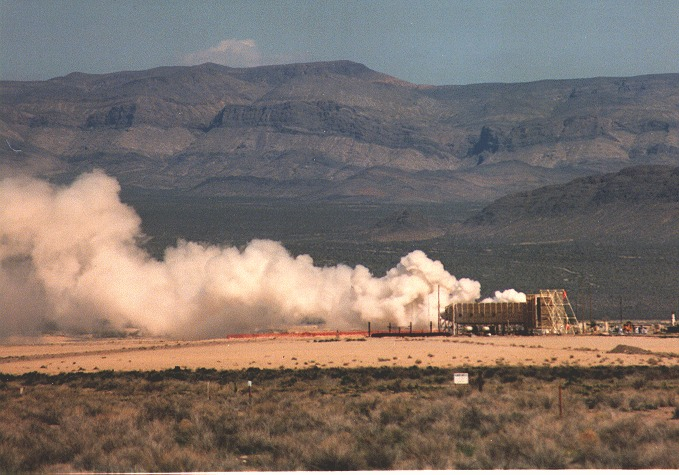
HAZMAT Spill Center wind tunnel in operation.

The Nonproliferation Test and Evaluation Complex (NPTEC), formerly called the Hazardous Material (HAZMAT) Spill Center, is located on Frenchman Flat in Area 5, a natural geological basin. It is the world's largest facility for open-air testing of hazardous materials and biological simulants. It includes a control building with data acquisition and recording instruments, a command and control computer, and support personnel. The test area has a tank farm, a wind tunnel, elevated stacks and spill pans, and storage tanks for the test chemicals. The facility houses both large-scale and small-scale hazardous materials testing and training. It provides a secure test-bed, calibrated release systems, weather data, ground truth instrumentation, and logistics in field verification and validation of technology.

== Area 11 ==
Area 11 covers 26 square miles (67 km^{2}) of the eastern border of NTS. Four atmospheric plutonium-dispersal safety tests were conducted in the northern portion of Area 11 in 1954 and 1956. Hazardous residues from these tests continue to provide a realistic environment for safety training, radiological monitoring, sampling instruction and first-responder drills. Five underground nuclear weapons were detonated in Area 11 from 1966 to 1971.

== See also ==
- Pahute Mesa
- Jackass Flats, Nevada
- Nye County, Nevada
