= Yucca Flat =

Nuclear test region in Nevada, US

Coordinates: 37.06°N 116.08°W

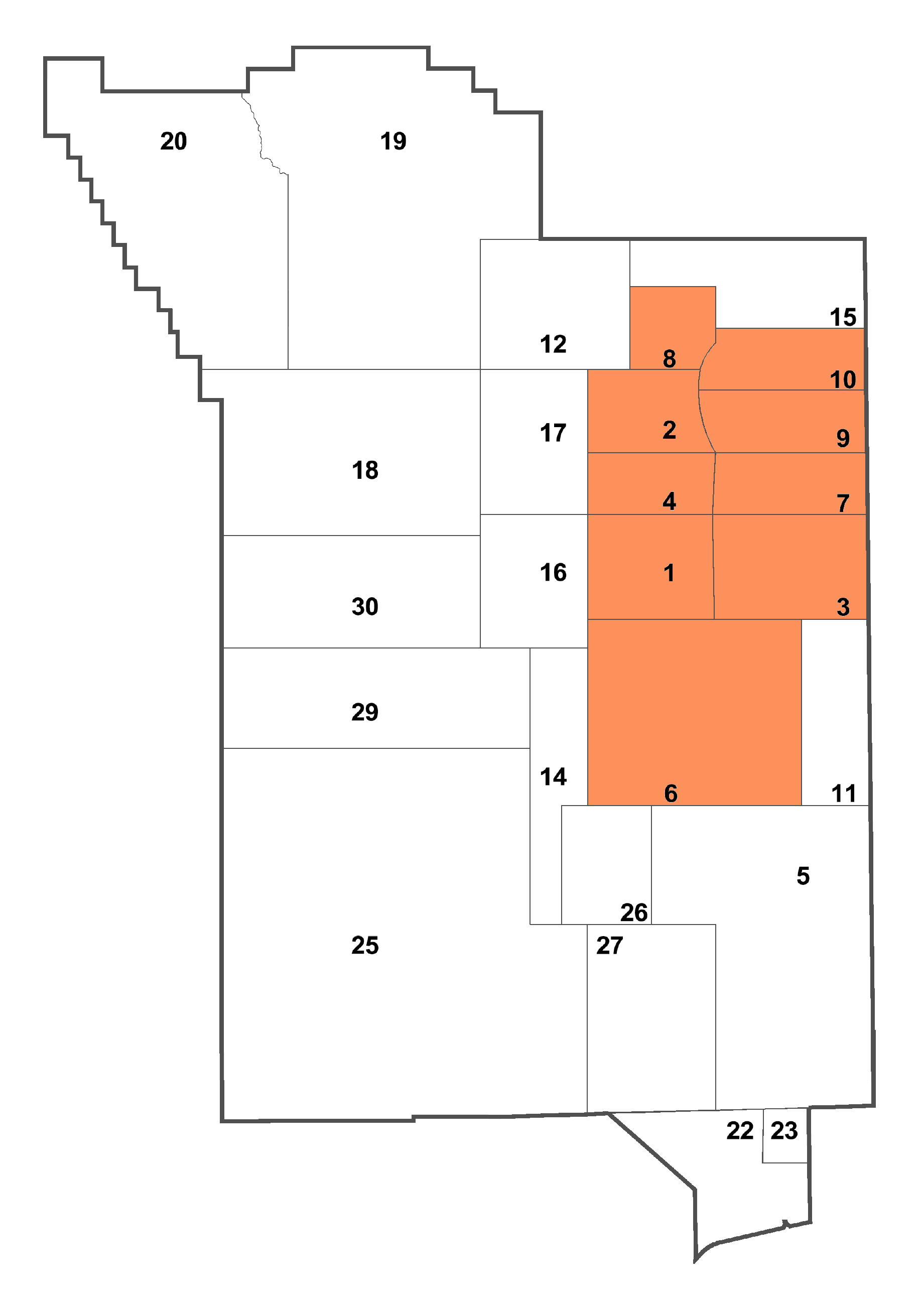
Yucca Flat occupies most of the central east portion of the Nevada Test Site

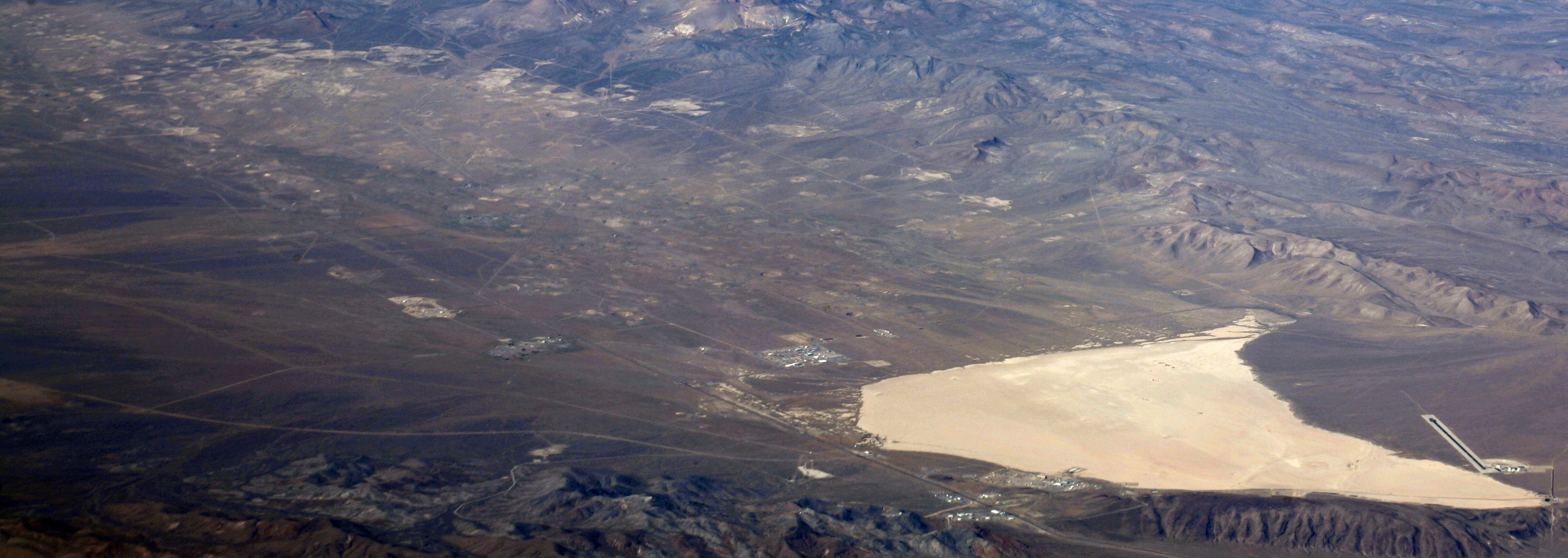
Yucca Flat has hundreds of subsidence craters from underground nuclear weapons tests. Asian Lake is visible on the right.

Yucca Flat is a closed desert drainage basin, one of four major nuclear test regions within the Nevada Test Site (NTS), and is divided into nine test sections: Areas 1 through 4 and 6 through 10. Yucca Flat is located at the eastern edge of NTS, about ten miles (16 km) north of Frenchman Flat, and 65 miles (105 km) from Las Vegas, Nevada. Yucca Flat was the site for 739 nuclear tests – nearly four of every five tests carried out at the NTS.

Yucca Flat has been called "the most irradiated, nuclear-blasted spot on the face of the earth". In March 2009, TIME identified the 1970 Yucca Flat Baneberry Test, where 86 workers were exposed to radiation, as one of the world's worst nuclear disasters.

== Geology ==
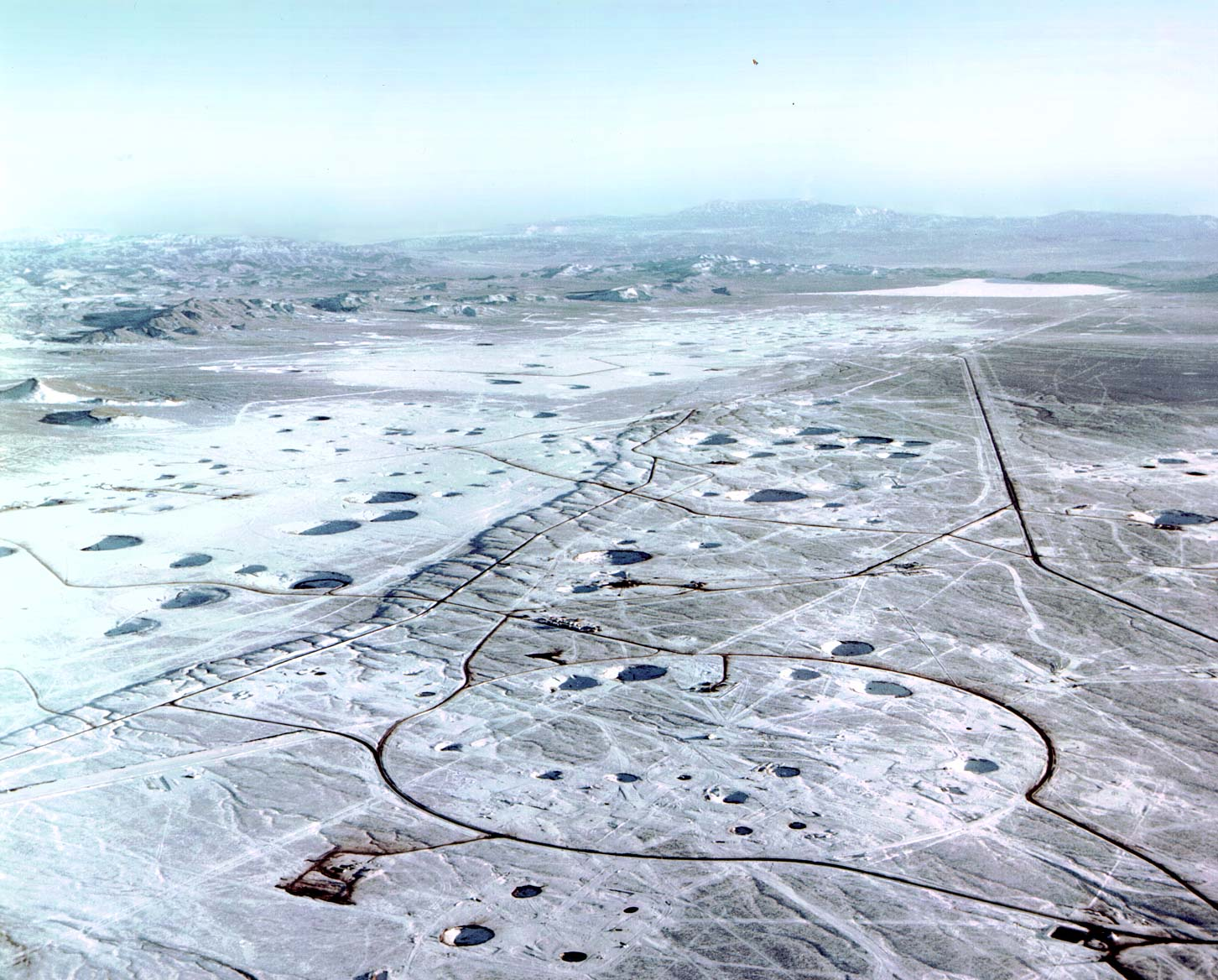
Subsidence craters at Yucca Flat

The open, sandy geology of Yucca Flat in the Tonopah Basin made for straightforward visual documentation of atmospheric nuclear tests. When testing went underground, deep layers of sedimentary soil from the erosion of the surrounding mountains allowed for relatively easy drilling of test holes.

Hundreds of subsidence craters dot the desert floor. A crater could develop when an underground nuclear explosion vaporized surrounding bedrock and sediment. The vapor cooled to liquid lava and pooled at the bottom of the cavity created by the explosion. Cracked rock and sediment layers above the explosion often settled into the cavity to form a crater.

At the south end of Yucca Flat is Yucca Lake, also called Yucca Dry Lake. The dry, alkaline lake bed holds a restricted runway (Yucca Airstrip) which was built by the Army Corps of Engineers before nuclear testing began in the area. To the west of the dry lake bed is News Nob, a rocky outcropping from which journalists and VIPs were able to watch atmospheric nuclear tests at Yucca Flat.

=== Nearby ===
West of the dry lake bed, cresting the top of Yucca Pass, is Control Point, or CP-1, the 31,600 sq ft (2,940 m^{2}) complex of buildings that contains testing and monitoring equipment for nuclear tests, and a cafeteria that seats 32. CP-1 overlooks Yucca and Frenchman Flats. Today, Control Point is the center for support of all activity at the NTS.

A subsidence crater in nearby Area 5 is used to store containers of contaminated scrap metal and debris; its radioactivity is periodically measured.

== Nuclear testing ==
Yucca Flat saw 739 nuclear tests, including 827 separate detonations. The higher number of detonations is from single tests that included multiple nuclear explosions occurring within a 0.1-second time window and inside a 1.2 mi (2 km) diameter circle. Sixty-two such tests took place at NTS.

No test at Yucca Flat ever exceeded 500 kilotons of expected yield. Tests of larger explosions were carried out at Rainier Mesa and Pahute Mesa, as their geology allowed deeper test shafts.

=== First tests ===
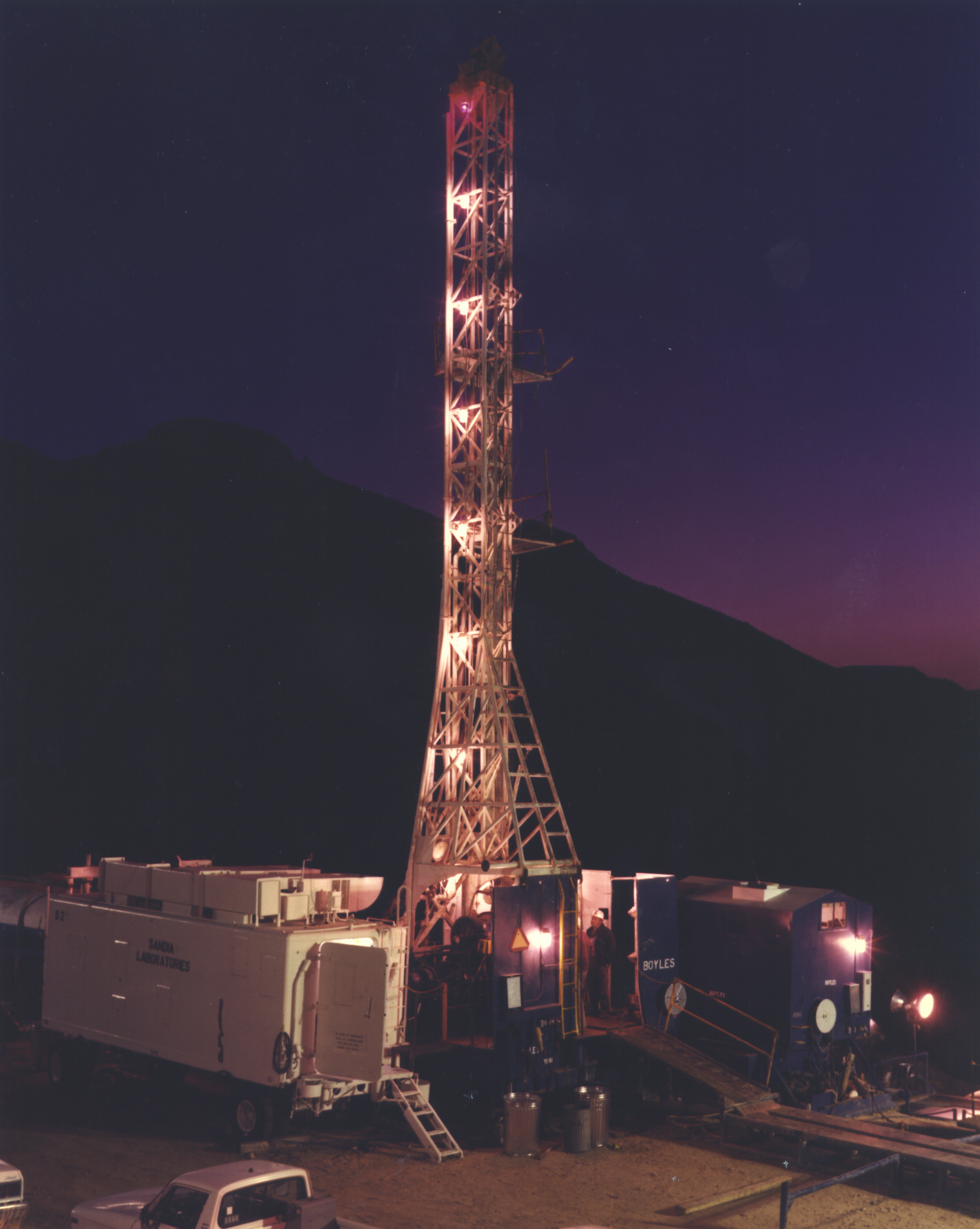
Drill rigs operated around the clock to prepare shafts deep enough for nuclear testing

The first test explosion at Yucca Flat came after five atmospheric tests at nearby Area 5 as part of Operation Ranger. On October 22, 1951, the "Able" test of Operation Buster was detonated at the top of a tower in Area 7, resulting in a nuclear yield less than an equivalent kilogram of TNT; the shot was a fizzle. It was the world's first failure of a nuclear device. Over the next two weeks, four successful tests were conducted by bomber aircraft that dropped nuclear weapons over Area 7.

The first underground test at NTS was the "Uncle" shot of Operation Jangle. Uncle detonated on November 29, 1951, within a shaft sunk into Area 10.

=== Operation Plumbbob ===
In Area 9, the 74-kiloton "Hood" test on July 5, 1957, part of Operation Plumbbob, was the largest atmospheric test ever conducted within the continental United States; nearly five times as large in yield as the bomb dropped on Hiroshima. A balloon carried Hood up to 1,510 ft (460 m) above the ground where it was detonated. Over 2,000 troops took part in the test in order to train them in conducting operations on the nuclear battlefield. The test released 11 megacuries (410 PBq) of iodine-131 (^{131}I) into the air. With a relatively brief half-life of eight days, ^{131}I is useful as a determinant in tracking specific nuclear contamination events. Iodine-131 comprises about 2% of radioactive materials in a cloud of dust stemming from a nuclear test, and causes thyroid problems if ingested.

The "John" shot of Plumbbob, on July 19, 1957, was the first test firing of the nuclear-tipped AIR-2 Genie air-to-air rocket designed to destroy incoming enemy bombers with a nuclear explosion. The two-kiloton warhead exploded approximately three miles (4.8 km) above five volunteers and a photographer who stood unprotected at "ground zero" in Area 10 to demonstrate the purported safety of battlefield nuclear weapons to personnel on the ground. The test also demonstrated the ability of a fighter aircraft to deliver a nuclear-tipped rocket and avoid being destroyed in the process. A Northrop F-89J fired the rocket.

=== Project Plowshare ===
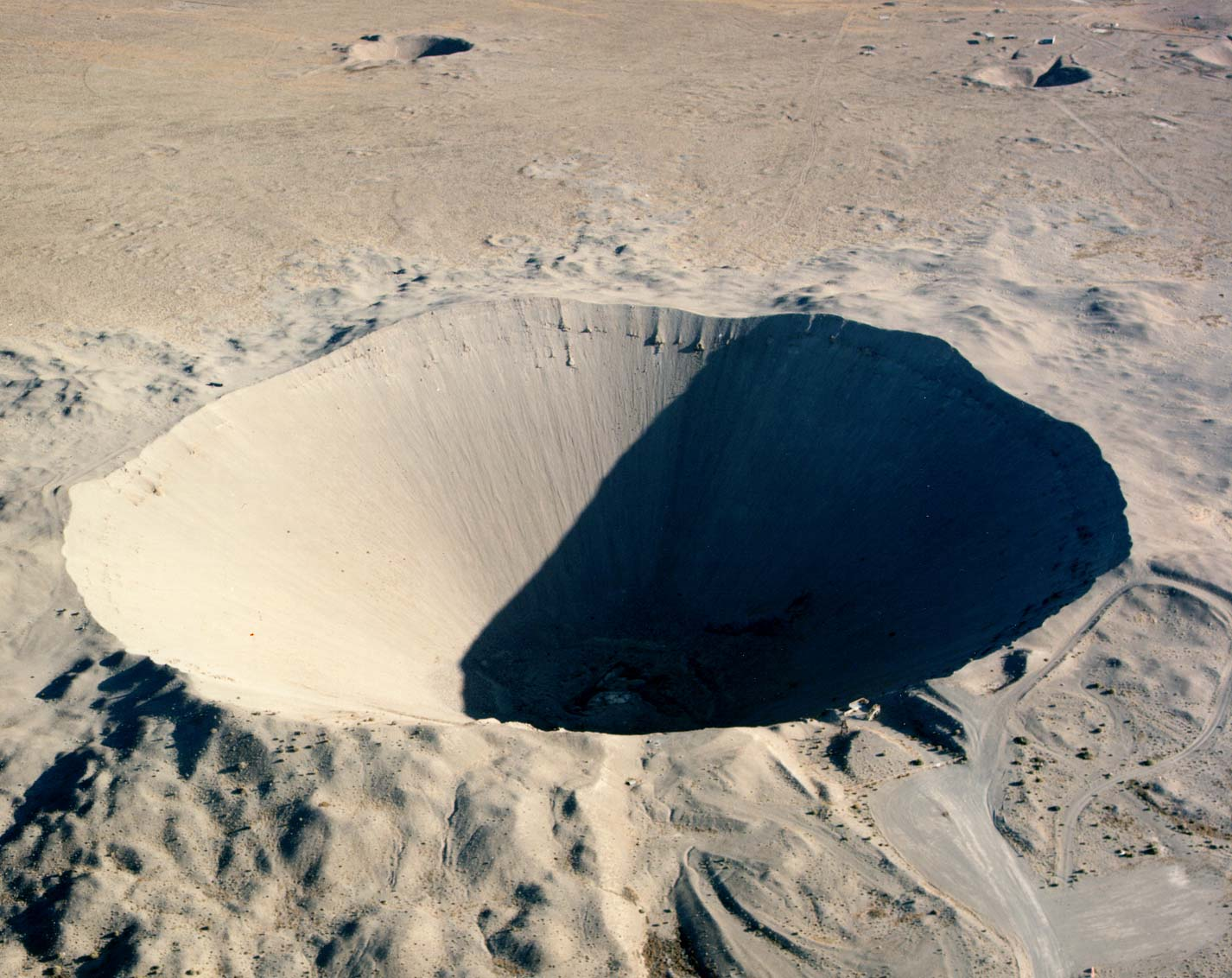
Area 10's Sedan crater is the largest at the Nevada Test Site

A dramatically different test shot was the "Sedan" test of Operation Storax on July 6, 1962, a 104 kiloton shot for Project Plowshare which sought to discover whether nuclear weapons could be used for peaceful means in creating lakes, bays or canals. The explosion displaced twelve million tons of earth, creating a crater 1,280 ft (390 m) wide and 320 ft (98 m) deep in Area 10. For an underground shot, a relatively large amount of energy was vented to the atmosphere, estimated to be 2.5 kilotons (7.4 bars of pressure). Two radioactive dust clouds rose up from the explosion and traveled across the United States, one at 10,000 ft (3,000 m) and the other at 16,000 ft (4,900 m). Both dropped radioactive particles across the USA before crossing into the sky above the Atlantic Ocean. Among many other radioisotopes, the clouds carried 880 kCi (33 PBq) of ^{131}I.

Sedan Crater was added to the National Register of Historic Places in 1994.

=== Baneberry ===
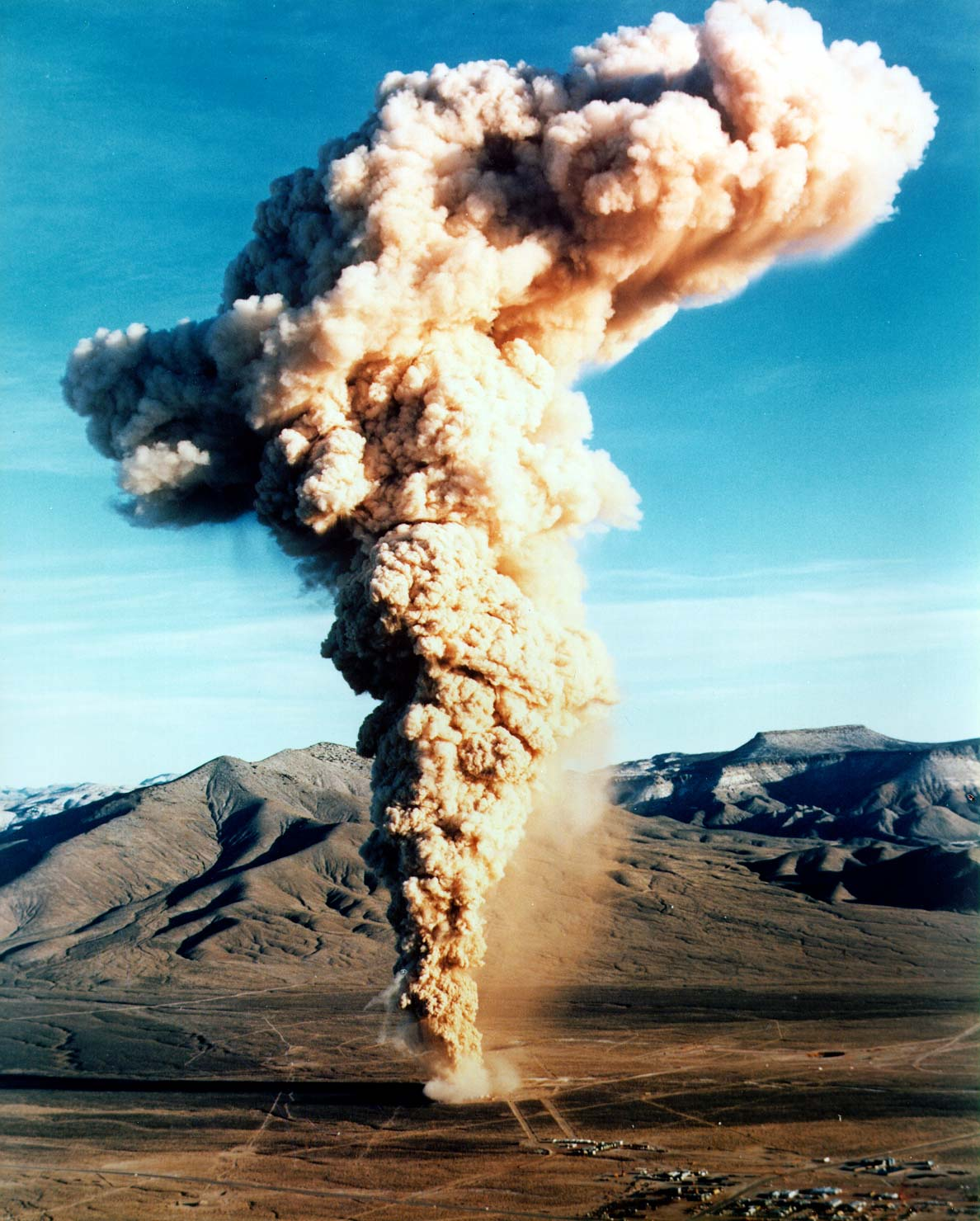
Baneberry's accidental radioactive plume rises from a shock fissure. It was carried in three different directions by the wind

Area 8 hosted the "Baneberry" shot of Operation Emery on December 18, 1970. The Baneberry 10-kiloton test detonated 900 ft (270 m) below the surface but its energy cracked the soil in unexpected ways, causing a fissure near ground zero and the failure of the shaft and cap. A plume of fire and dust was released 3.5 minutes after initiation, raining fallout on workers in different locations within NTS. The radioactive plume released 6.7 megacuries (250 PBq) of radioactive material, including 80 kCi (3.0 PBq) of iodine-131. After dropping a portion of its material locally, the plume's lighter particles were carried to three altitudes and conveyed by winter storms and the jet stream to be deposited heavily as radionuclide-laden snow in Lassen and Sierra counties in northeast California, and to lesser degrees in southern Idaho, northern Nevada and some eastern sections of Oregon and Washington states. The three diverging jet stream layers conducted radionuclides across the US to Canada, the Gulf of Mexico and the Atlantic Ocean.

Some 86 workers at the site were exposed to radioactivity, but according to the Department of Energy none received a dose exceeding site guidelines and, similarly, radiation drifting offsite was not considered to pose a hazard by the DOE. In March 2009, TIME magazine identified the Baneberry Test as one of the world's worst nuclear disasters.

Two US Federal court cases resulted from the Baneberry event. Two NTS workers who were exposed to high levels of radiation from Baneberry died in 1974, both from acute myeloid leukemia. The district court found that although the Government had acted negligently, the radiation from the Baneberry test did not cause the leukemia cases. The district decision was upheld on appeal in 1996.

=== Huron King ===
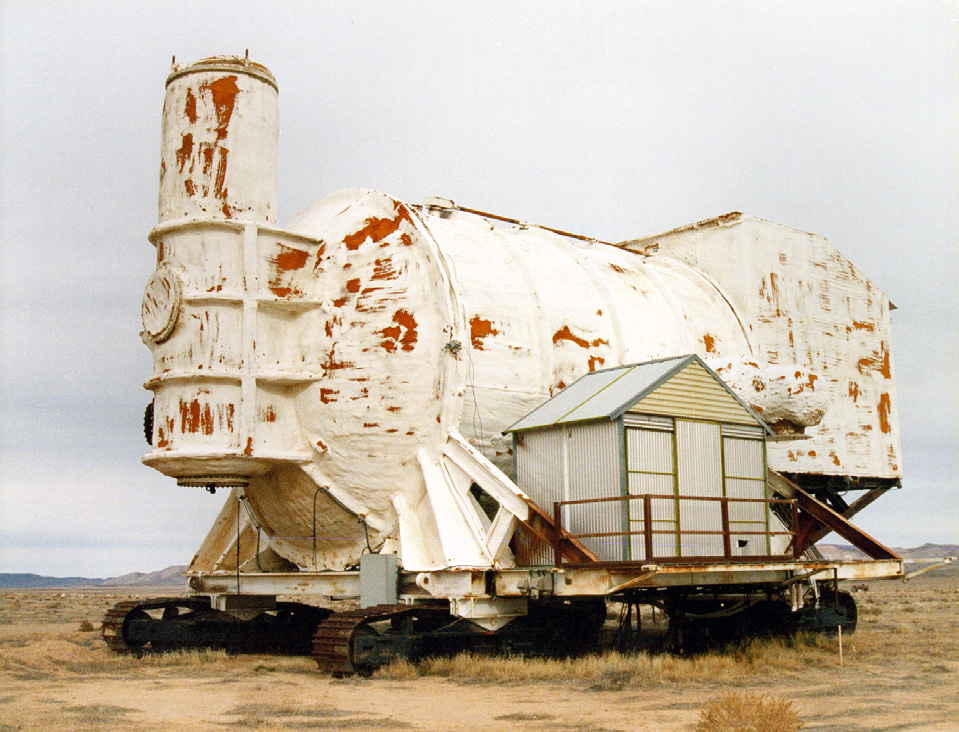
The Huron King test chamber was used to simulate the vacuum of space

As part of Operation Tinderbox, on June 24, 1980, a small satellite prototype (DSCS III) was subjected to radioactivity from the "Huron King" shot in a vertical line-of-sight (VLOS) test undertaken in Area 3. This was a program to improve the database on nuclear hardening design techniques for defense satellites. The VLOS test configuration involved placing a nuclear device (less than 20 kilotons) at the bottom of a shaft. A communications satellite or other experiment was placed in a partially evacuated test chamber simulating a space environment. The test chamber was parked at ground level at the top of the shaft. At zero time, the radiation from the device shot up the vertical pipe to the surface test chamber. Mechanical closures then intercepted and sealed the pipe, preventing the explosive shock wave from damaging the targets. The test chamber was immediately disconnected by remote control from the pipe and quickly winched to safety before the ground could subside to form a crater. The Huron King test cost US$10.3 million in 1980 (equivalent to $40.2 million today).

=== Last test ===
The final test at Yucca Flat (also the last test at the entire Nevada Test Site) was Operation Julin's "Divider" on September 23, 1992, just prior to the moratorium temporarily ending all nuclear testing. Divider was a safety experiment test shot that was detonated at the bottom of a shaft sunk into Area 3.

=== Abandoned tests ===
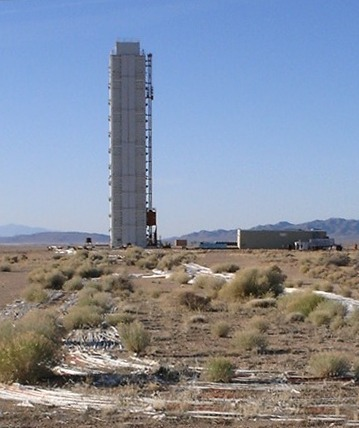
IceCap test tower

Three tests planned for 1993 have been abandoned in place, two in Yucca Flat. The Comprehensive Nuclear-Test-Ban Treaty had been strongly supported by the UN General Assembly in 1991, and negotiations began in earnest in 1993. The United States, on October 3, 1992, suspended all nuclear weapons testing programs in anticipation of eventual ratification of the treaty. The partially assembled cabling, towers and equipment for shot "Icecap" in Area 1 and shot "Gabbs" in Area 2 lie amid weeds and blowing dust, waiting for a possible resumption of nuclear testing. Shot "Greenwater" awaits its fate in Area 19 at Pahute Mesa. "Icecap" was to be a joint US-UK test event.

== Radioactivity ==
=== UGTA ===
The United States Department of Energy produced a report in April, 1997, on a subproject of the Nevada Environmental Restoration Project. The larger project involves environmental restoration and mitigation activities in the NTS, Tonopah Test Range, Nellis Air Force Range, and eight further sites in five other states. The Underground Test Area (UGTA) subproject focuses on defining the boundaries of areas containing unsafe water contaminated with radionuclides from underground nuclear tests. The ongoing subproject is tasked with predicting the future extent of contaminated water due to natural flow and it is expected to quantify safe limits for human health. Yucca Flat was identified as a Corrective Action Unit (CAU). Because of the great expense and virtual impossibility of cleaning up the Nevada Test Site, it has been characterized as a "national sacrifice zone."

=== USGS ===
In 2003, the United States Geological Survey (USGS) collected and processed magnetotellurics (MT) and audio-magnetotelluric (AMT) data at the Nevada Test Site from 51 data stations placed in and near Yucca Flat to get a more accurate idea of the pre-Tertiary geology found in the Yucca Flat Corrective Action Unit (CAU). The intent was to discover the character, thickness, and lateral extent of pre-Tertiary rock formations that affect the flow of underground water. In particular, a major goal was to define the upper clastic confining unit (UCCU) in the Yucca Flat area.

=== First responder training ===
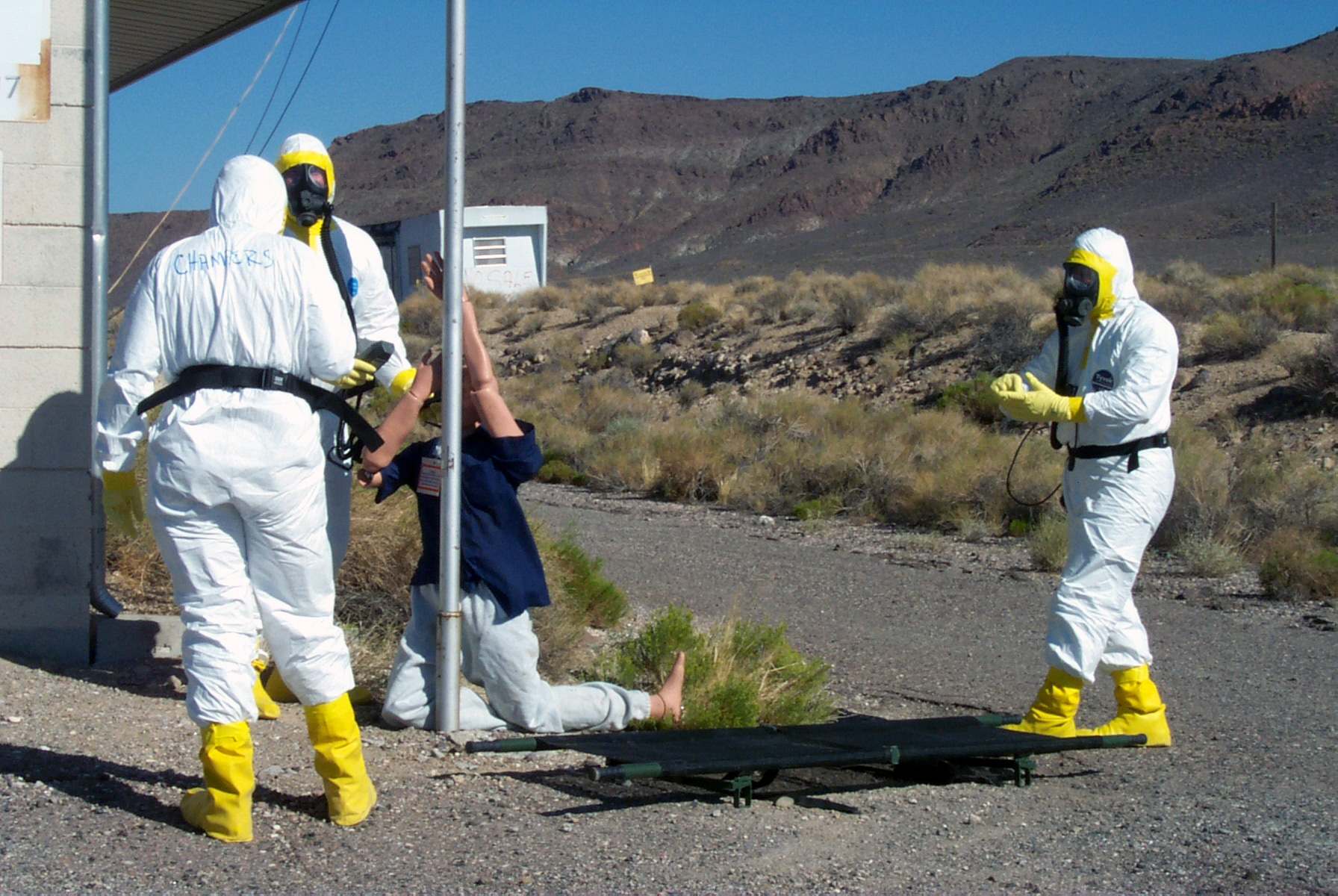
First responder trainees treat a simulated radiation victim in Area 1

The radioactivity present on the ground in Area 1 provides a radiologically contaminated environment for the training of first responders. Trainees are exposed to methods of radiation detection and its health hazards. Further training takes place in other areas of NTS.

== See also ==
- How to Photograph an Atomic Bomb
- Jackass Flats, Nevada
- Mercury, Nevada
- Nevada Test Site
- Nye County, Nevada
- Pahute Mesa
- The Beast of Yucca Flats
