= Rokkasho Rhapsody =

- Directed by: Hitomi Kamanaka
- Produced by: Shūkichi Koizumi
- Cinematography: Natsuro Ōno
- Edited by: Yoshiko Matsuda
- Production company: Group Gendai
- Release date: March 3, 2006
- Running time: 119 minutes
- Country: Japan
- Language: Japanese

Rokkasho Rhapsody (六ヶ所村ラプソディー, Rokkashomura rapusodī; also sometimes called in English Rokkashomura Rhapsody) is a Japanese documentary directed by Hitomi Kamanaka and released in 2006. It is the second in Kamanaka's trilogy of films on the problems of nuclear power and radiation, preceded by Hibakusha at the End of the World (also known as Radiation: A Slow Death) and followed by Ashes to Honey.

== Content ==
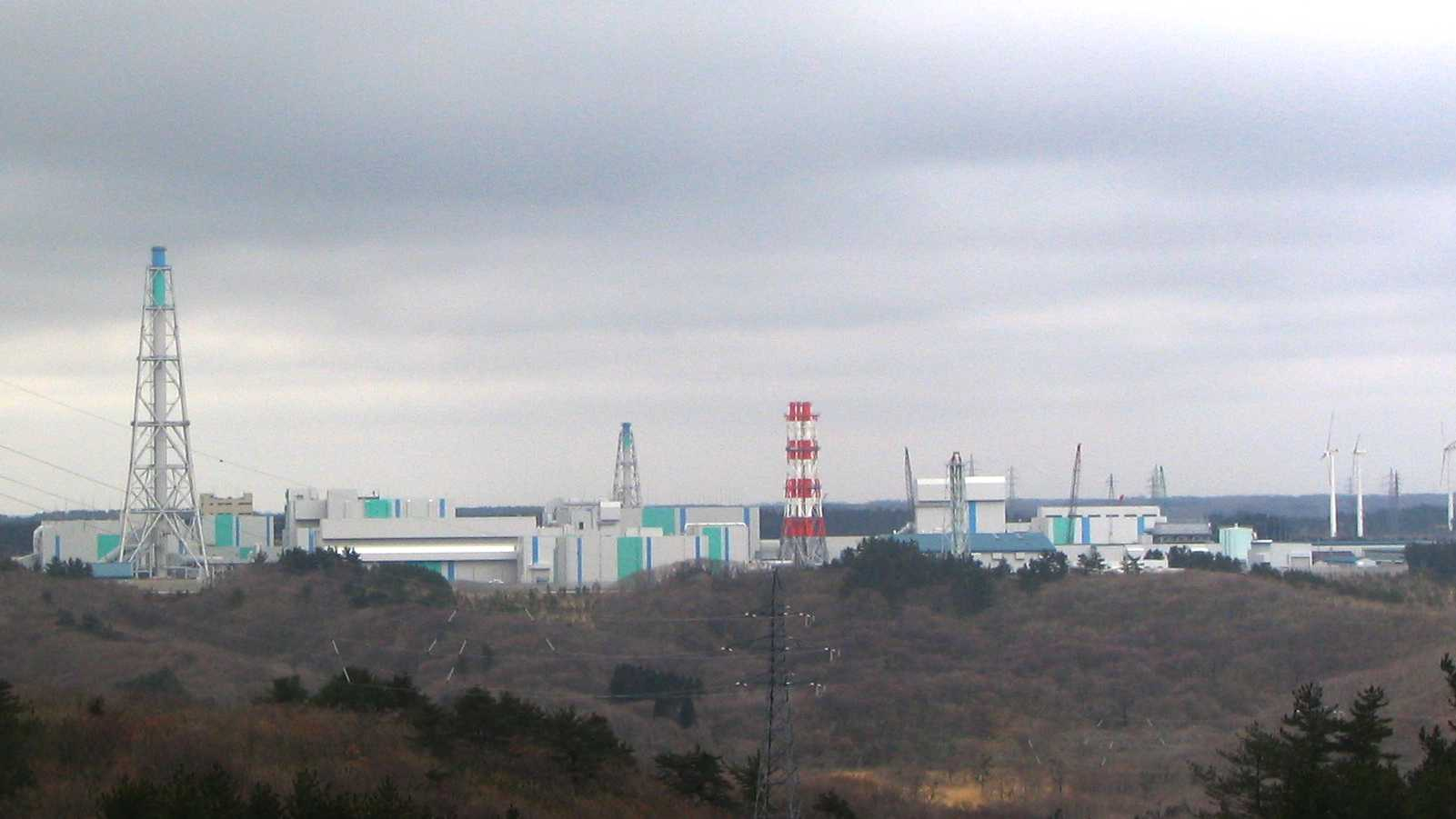
Rokkasho Reprocessing Plant

The documentary reports on the issues surrounding the construction of the Rokkasho Reprocessing Plant in Aomori Prefecture, especially focusing on the lives of the nearby residents who, while nervous about the dangers of radiation, continue living near the plant. It also covers the protests against the plant.

== Reception ==
In a poll of critics at Kinema Junpo, Rokkasho Rhapsody was selected as the fourth best documentary of 2006.

== See also ==
- List of books about nuclear issues
- List of films about nuclear issues
- Ashes to Honey

== Bibliography ==
- Kamanaka, Hitomi; Norma Field (2008). Rokkasho-mura rapusodī = Rokkashomura rhapsody: dokyumentarī genzai shinkōkei. Tokyo: Kage Shobō. ISBN 9784877143893.
