= Rokkasho Reprocessing Plant =

Nuclear reprocessing plant in Japan

Coordinates: 40°57′45″N 141°19′35″E

Rokkasho Reprocessing Plant (Japan)

The Rokkasho Nuclear Fuel Reprocessing Facility (六ヶ所村核燃料再処理施設, Rokkasho Kakunenryō Saishori Shisetsu) is a nuclear reprocessing plant with an annual capacity of 800 tons of uranium or 8 tons of plutonium. It is owned by Japan Nuclear Fuel Limited (JNFL) and is part of the Rokkasho complex located in the village of Rokkasho in northeast Aomori Prefecture, on the Pacific coast of the northernmost part of Japan's main island of Honshu.

== History ==
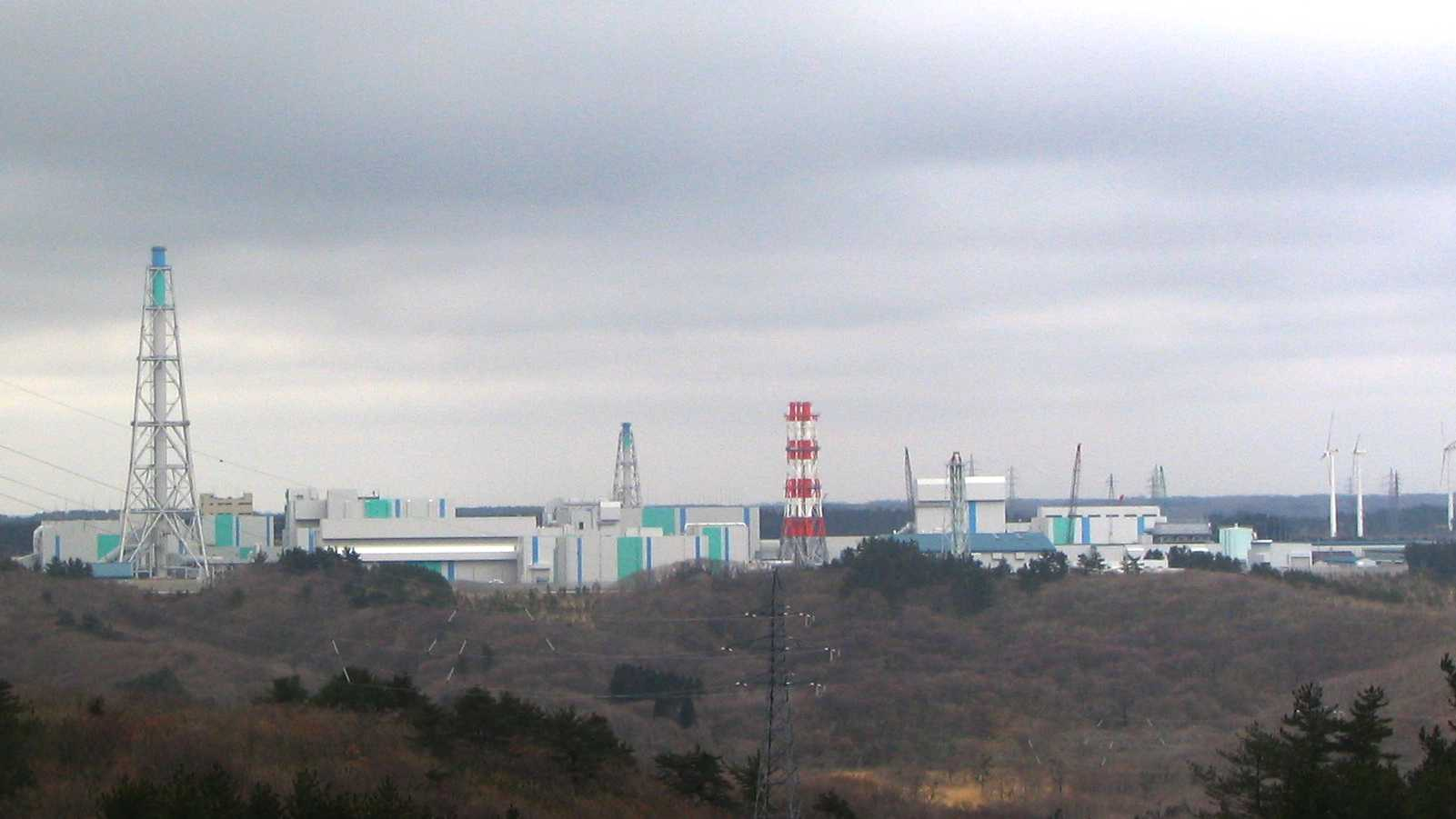
Rokkasho Reprocessing Plant

Construction of the plant began in 1993, and was originally expected to be completed in 1997, but the completion date has been postponed 23 times by 2017.

It took inspiration of the French site at La Hague (then operated by the COGEMA and then Areva) and was built in partnership with Areva.

Construction and testing of the facility were complete in 2013 according to JNFL, and the site was intended to begin operating in October 2013; however this was delayed by new safety regulations. In December 2013 JNFL announced the plant would be ready for operation in October 2014. In 2015, the start of the reprocessing plant was postponed again, this time to as late as September 2018.

In December 2017, the completion date was put back a further three years, to 2021, to allow for further safety measures at the reprocessing plant and the MOX fuel fabrication plant to meet post-Fukushima safety standards. The delays have caused many parts of the plant to deteriorate, and the closure of the unsuccessful fast breeder reactor at Monju in 2016 reduces the need for the policy of nuclear fuel reprocessing. In August 2018 more corroded pipes were found.

In 2018 the Japanese Atomic Energy Commission updated plutonium guidelines to try to reduce plutonium stockpiles, stipulating that Rokkasho should only produce the amount of plutonium required for mixed oxide fuel for Japan's nuclear plants.

In 2020 the completion date was put back again to 2022 for further safety measures including the construction of another cooling tower. The MOX fuel manufacturing plant is expected to be operational in 2024. As of 2023, JNFL claims an operational date of April–October 2024

== Description ==
The Rokkasho plant is the successor to a smaller reprocessing plant that was located in Tōkai, Ibaraki in central Japan which shutdown in 2014 and was approved for decommissioning in 2018.

The Rokkasho facilities complex includes:

- A high level nuclear waste monitoring facility
- A MOX fuel fabrication plant
- A uranium enrichment plant
- A low level radioactive waste landfill

In 2010, the Rokkasho complex consisted of 38 buildings on an area of 3,800,000 m^{2}.

Vitrification tests were completed in November 2007. This consists of pouring high level dry waste residue along with molten glass into steel canisters.

As of 2018, over a third of Japan's 10 metric tons of domestically held plutonium is stored at Rokkasho.

== Economic aspects ==
Since 1993 there has been US$20 billion invested in the project, nearly triple the original cost estimate. A 2011 estimate put the cost at US$27.5 billion.

== Protests ==
In May 2006, an international awareness campaign about the dangers of the Rokkasho reprocessing plant called "Stop Rokkasho" was launched by musician Ryuichi Sakamoto. Greenpeace Japan opposed the Rokkasho Reprocessing Plant and ran an online campaign to stop the project called "Wings of Peace – No more Hiroshima Nagasaki" from 2002 until 2005. The Consumers Union of Japan together with 596 organisations and groups participated in a march against the Rokkasho Reprocessing Plant in central Tokyo on 27 January 2008. Over 810,000 signatures were collected and handed in to the government on 28 January 2008. Representatives of the protesters, which included fishery associations, consumer cooperatives and surfer groups, handed the petition to the Cabinet Office and the Ministry of Economy, Trade and Industry.

Seven consumer organisations have joined in this effort: Consumers Union of Japan, Seikatsu Club Consumer's Co-operative Union, Daichi-o-Mamoru Kai, Green Consumer's Co-operative Union, Consumer's Co-operative Union "Kirari", Consumer's Co-operative Miyagi and Pal-system Co-operative Union.

According to The Japan Times, "Experts including Frank von Hippel, a Princeton University theoretical physicist, have urged Japan to stop spent fuel reprocessing." The fundamental objection to reprocessing—the separation of plutonium from spent power reactor fuel—is that the plutonium could be used in nuclear weapons. The plant in Rokkasho aims to be able to separate several tons of plutonium per year where a nuclear weapon requires only several kilograms. To mitigate this risk the plant uses a combined uranium plutonium extraction process where plutonium cannot be recovered by itself.

== 2011 Tōhoku earthquake and tsunami ==
In June 2008, several scientists stated that the Rokkasho plant is situated directly above an active geological fault line that could produce a magnitude 8 earthquake but Japan Nuclear Fuel Limited stated that according to their investigation the fault had not been active in the last million years and there was no reason to fear an earthquake of more than magnitude 6.5 at the site and that the plant could withstand a 6.9 quake. Other scientists say that more study is needed.

After the Tōhoku earthquake (magnitude 9.1) on 11 March 2011, the plant ran on emergency power provided by backup diesel generators. The emergency generators were not intended for long-term use. There were about 3,000 tons of highly radioactive used nuclear fuel stored in Rokkasho at that time. Japanese radio reported on 13 March that 600 liters of water had leaked from the Rokkasho spent fuel pool. According to The New York Times, grid power was restored 3 days later on 14 March 2011.

The 7 April aftershock caused the loss of grid power again until the next day.

== See also ==
- Rokkasho Rhapsody – A documentary by Hitomi Kamanaka on the plant
- Nuclear reprocessing; other reprocessing sites:
  - La Hague site (Orano Cycle), in France
  - Thorp nuclear fuel reprocessing plant (Sellafield), in the United Kingdom
- 5 yen coin
- Tōkai Nuclear Power Plant, whose reprocessing facility Rokkasho was meant to succeed to
