= Ashes to Honey =

- Original poster
- Directed by: Hitomi Kamanaka
- Produced by: Shūkichi Koizumi
- Production company: Group Gendai
- Release date: September 18, 2010 (Ishikawa)
- Running time: 116 minutes
- Country: Japan
- Language: Japanese

Ashes to Honey (ミツバチの羽音と地球の回転, Mitsubachi no haoto to chikyū no kaiten), (literally "Humming of Bees and Rotation of the Earth") is a Japanese documentary directed by Hitomi Kamanaka and released in 2010. It is the third in Kamanaka's trilogy of films on the problems of nuclear power and radiation, preceded by Hibakusha at the End of the World (also known as Radiation: A Slow Death) and Rokkasho Rhapsody.

== Content ==
The documentary covers the long struggle of the residents of Iwaijima island in the Inland Sea of Japan to prevent the construction of a nuclear power plant across the bay. It compares the situation to Sweden, where models of sustainable energy are being explored.

== Production ==
Kamanaka began filming the documentary in 2008 and completed it in 2010. The 2011 Tōhoku earthquake, which later caused the Fukushima nuclear accident, took place right during the film's first Tokyo screening.

== Reception ==
In a poll of critics at Kinema Junpo, Ashes to Honey was selected as the fifth best documentary of 2011.

== See also ==
- List of books about nuclear issues
- List of films about nuclear issues
- Rokkasho Rhapsody
