= Nuclear Threat Initiative =

American foreign policy think tank

- Abbreviation: NTI
- Formation: 2001; 25 years ago
- Founders: Sam Nunn; Ted Turner
- Type: 501(c)(3) organization
- Tax ID no.: 52-2289435
- Purpose: Global catastrophic risk
- Headquarters: 1776 Eye Street, NW
- Location: Washington, D.C., U.S.
- President: Christine Wormuth
- Expenses: (2017)
- Website: www.nti.org

The Nuclear Threat Initiative (NTI) is an American non-profit organization located in Washington, D.C. NTI was founded in 2001 by former U.S. senator Sam Nunn and philanthropist Ted Turner and describes itself as a "nonprofit, nonpartisan global security organization focused on reducing nuclear, biological, and emerging technology threats imperiling humanity".

NTI has four policy programs: the Global Nuclear Policy Program, Nuclear Materials Security, Emerging Tech, and Global Biological Policy and Programs (stylized as NTI | bio).

== History ==
NTI's launch event was held at the National Press Club on January 8, 2001. An event celebrating NTI's 20th anniversary was held on April 12, 2022, with a one-year delay due to the COVID-19 pandemic.

== Work ==
=== Low-enriched uranium bank ===
NTI supported the development of an international low-enriched uranium bank to help prevent the proliferation of nuclear technology. NTI advisor Warren Buffett provided $50 million to jump-start the reserve, which is owned and managed by the International Atomic Energy Agency and located in Kazakhstan. The bank became fully operational in October 2019 after receiving its first shipment of uranium.

=== Highly enriched uranium elimination ===
==== Serbia ====
In 2002, NTI provided much of the financial support for a joint U.S.-Russian mission to remove 100 pounds of highly enriched uranium from the Vinča Nuclear Institute in Serbia, to be flown to Russia.

==== Kazakhstan ====
NTI provided technical and financial support to help convert 2,900 kilograms of highly enriched uranium to low-enriched uranium in Kazakhstan in 2005. The organization committed $1.3 million for reactor safety systems.

=== Nuclear Security Index ===
NTI has produced a biennial "Nuclear Security Index" in partnership with Economist Impact since 2012. The "NTI Index" benchmarks nuclear security conditions across 176 countries.

As part of the Index, NTI also develops and releases a Radioactive Source Security Assessment that includes recommendations on securing and eliminating radiological sources used and stored at thousands of sites across more than 100 countries.

=== Global Health Security Index ===
The Global Health Security Index, produced by NTI, the Johns Hopkins Center for Health Security, and Economist Impact, is a biennial index that assesses countries' preparedness to respond to pandemics and epidemics. The GHS Index assesses 195 countries' abilities to prevent, detect, and respond to health emergencies based on publicly available information.

=== World Health Organization–Nuclear Threat Initiative Emergency Outbreak Response Fund ===
In 2002, NTI partnered with the World Health Organization (WHO) to create a $500,000 rapid response fund for infectious disease outbreaks.

=== Global dialogue on nuclear security priorities ===
NTI regularly convenes meetings among global nuclear security experts and government officials to discuss issues related to nuclear security. Global Dialogue summits have taken place in France, the Netherlands, the Czech Republic, Germany, Austria, the United Kingdom, the United States, and Japan.

=== Establishment of new organizations ===
In 2003, NTI created the Middle East Consortium for Infectious Disease Surveillance (MECIDS) with participation from Israel, Jordan, and the Palestinian Authority. MECIDS shares official health data and conducts infectious disease prevention training.

In 2008, NTI helped create the World Institute for Nuclear Security (WINS), in Vienna, as part of its focus to secure nuclear materials worldwide.

NTI also created Connecting Organizations for Disease Surveillance (CORDS), which launched in 2013 as an independent NGO that links international disease surveillance networks, supported by the World Health Organization and Food and Agriculture Organization of the United Nations.

=== Films ===
The organization produced the 2005 film, Last Best Chance, a docudrama about nuclear terrorism that aired on HBO. NTI also produced the 2010 documentary film Nuclear Tipping Point, which was screened by President Obama at the White House in April 2010 and featured on The Colbert Report.

== Leadership ==
Ernest J. Moniz was chief executive officer from June 2017 to September 2025, when former Army Secretary Christine Wormuth was named president and CEO.

=== Board of directors ===
- Ernest J. Moniz, co-chairman and chief executive Officer, NTI
- Sam Nunn, co-chair, co-founder and strategic advisor, NTI
- Ted Turner, co-chair
- Des Browne, vice chairman, NTI
- Joan Rohlfing, president, NTI
- Ambassador Hamad Alkaabi, permanent representative of the United Arab Emirates to the International Atomic Energy Agency and special representative for International Nuclear Cooperation
- Ambassador Brooke D. Anderson, president of Pivotal Ventures
- Dr. Alexey Arbatov, head, Center for International Security at Institute of World Economy and International Relations, Russian Academy of Sciences
- Edmund G. Brown Jr., former Governor of California
- Ambassador Rolf Ekeus, chairman emeritus of the board, Stockholm International Peace Research Institute
- Gideon Frank, former director general of the Israel Atomic Energy Commission
- Margaret A. Hamburg, M.D., former commissioner of the U.S. Food and Drug Administration
- Igor S. Ivanov, former minister of foreign affairs, Russia
- Jeong H. Kim, former president, Bell Labs
- Michelle McMurry-Heath, president and CEO, Biotechnology Innovation Organization
- Admiral Michael G. Mullen, USN (ret.), 17th chairman, Joint Chiefs of Staff
- Ronald L. Olson, Partner, Los Angeles office of Munger, Tolles & Olson
- Michael A. Peterson, chairman and chief executive Officer of the Peter G. Peterson Foundation
- Malcolm Rifkind, former foreign secretary, UK
- Ray Rothrock, executive chairman, RedSeal, Inc. and partner emeritus, Venrock
- Louis Salkind, president, Bright Horizon Foundation
- Laura Turner Seydel, chair of Captain Planet Foundation and director of Turner Foundation
- Dr. Nathalie Tocci, director, Istituto Affari Internazionali
- Ambassador Alexa Wesner, former U.S. Ambassador to Austria
- Dr. Peng Yuan, president, China Institutes of Contemporary International Relations

=== Advisors to the board of directors ===
- Warren Buffett, CEO of Berkshire Hathaway Inc.
- Siegfried S. Hecker, co-director, Stanford University Center for International Security and Cooperation

=== Emeritus board ===
- Charles A. Bowsher, former comptroller general to the United States and head of the General Accounting Office
- Liru Cui, former president of China Institutes of Contemporary International Relations
- Charles B. Curtis, president emeritus of NTI
- Susan Eisenhower
- HRH Prince El Hassan bin Talal of Jordan
- Ambassador Jon M. Huntsman, Jr., former U.S. Ambassador to Russia, China, and Singapore
- Riaz Mohammad Khan, former foreign secretary of Pakistan
- Pierre Lellouche
- Jessica T. Mathews
- Ambassador Hisashi Owada
- William J. Perry
- Nafis Sadik
- Amartya Sen
- Fujia Yang

== Financials ==
NTI receives funding from a number of sources, including foundations, individuals, non-U.S. governments, and corporations. Funders and financial information are listed in NTI's annual report, which is published online each year. The organization does not accept U.S. government funding.

== See also ==
- Global Health Security Index
