= Hitomi Kamanaka =

Japanese documentary filmmaker

- Born: 11 June 1958 (age 67); Toyama Prefecture, Japan
- Occupation: Documentary film director
- Known for: Rokkasho Rhapsody

Hitomi Kamanaka (鎌仲ひとみ, Kamanaka Hitomi) (born 11 June 1958, Toyama Prefecture, Japan) is a Japanese documentary filmmaker known particularly for her films on nuclear power and radiation.

== Career ==
Graduating from Waseda University in 1984, Kamanaka began working as an assistant director for documentaries at Group Gendai, Iwanami Productions, and other companies. She directed her first film in 1990 and between 1990 and 1995, worked and studied in Canada and the United States, first on a grant from Japan's Agency for Cultural Affairs. Returning to Japan, she worked as a freelance director for television and film. Her film, Hibakusha at the End of the World (also known as Radiation: A Slow Death), was the first of several she has made on the problems of nuclear radiation. It won several awards, including one from the Agency for Cultural Affairs for excellence in documentary. Her next film on nuclear issues, Rokkasho Rhapsody, covered the problems surrounding the Rokkasho Reprocessing Plant. Her most recent work, Ashes to Honey, about residents fighting the construction of a nuclear power plant in Yamaguchi Prefecture, opened in theaters only a month before the Fukushima Daiichi nuclear disaster. After the disaster, her work has garnered increased attention and she has been asked to present her work at numerous venues at home and abroad.

== Selected filmography ==
- Hibakusha at the End of the World (ヒバクシャ 世界の終わりに Hibakusha, sekai no owari ni) (2003) (also known as Radiation: A Slow Death)
- Rokkasho Rhapsody (六ヶ所村ラプソディー Rokkashomura rapusodī) (2006)
- Ashes to Honey (ミツバチの羽音と地球の回転 Mitsubachi no haoto to chikyū no kaiten) (2010)
- Little Voices from Fukushima (小さき声のカノン－選択する人々Chisaki koe no kannon - sentaku suru hitobito) (2014)
