= List of films about nuclear issues =

Films discussing the dangers, utilization, and existence of nuclear power and weapons

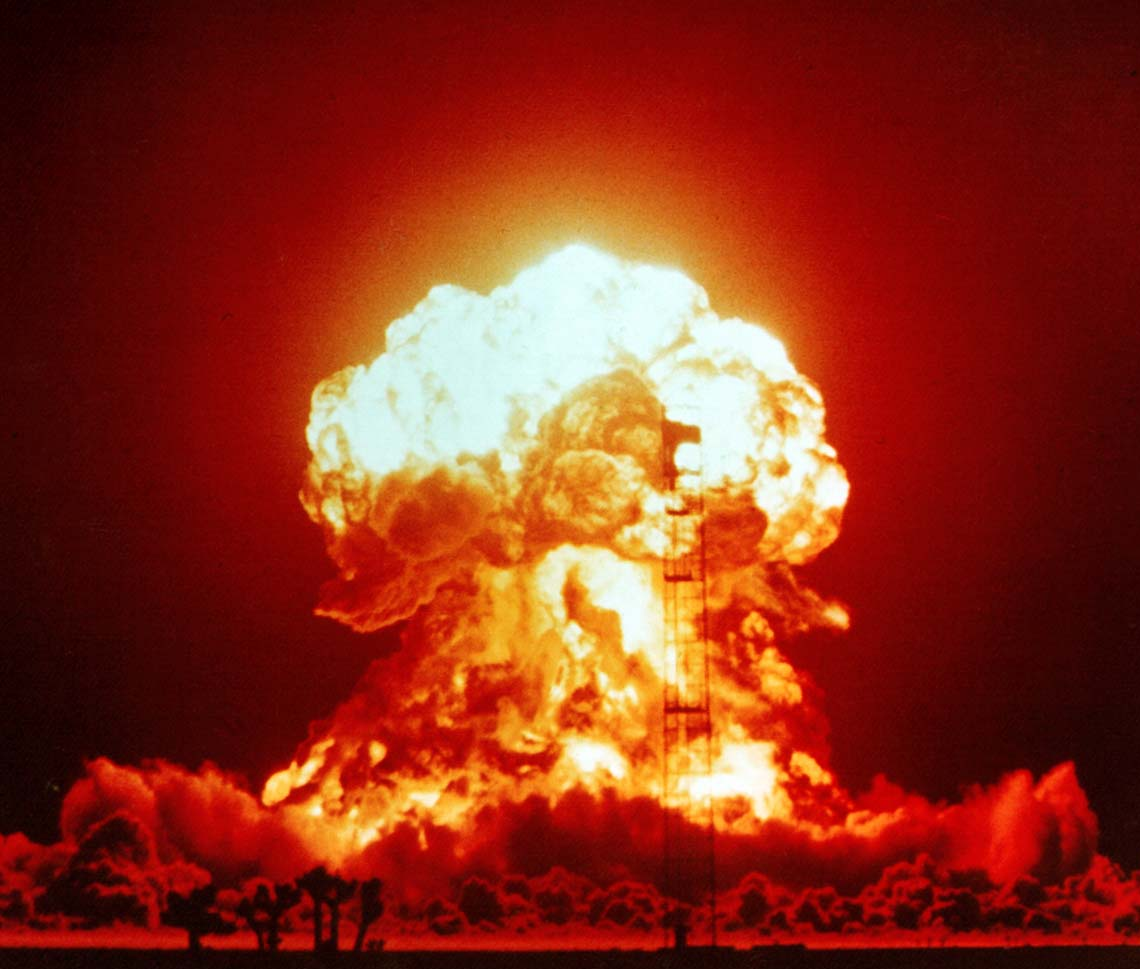
A nuclear fireball lights up the night in a United States nuclear test.

This is a list of films about nuclear issues:

== Documentary films ==
- Ashes to Honey
- The Atom Strikes!
- The Atomic Cafe
- Atomic Ed and the Black Hole
- Atomic Power
- The Bomb (2015)
- Chernobyl Heart
- Command and Control
- Countdown to Zero
- Dark Circle
- The Day After Trinity
- Deadly Deception: General Electric, Nuclear Weapons and Our Environment
- Duck and Cover
- Heavy Water: A Film for Chernobyl
- First Strike
- A Guide to Armageddon (Q.E.D. episode)
- Hiroshima
- The Hole in the Ground
- The House in the Middle
- If You Love This Planet
- Into Eternity
- Last Best Chance
- The Man Who Saved the World
- The Mushroom Club
- Nuclear Secrets
- Nuclear Tipping Point
- One World or None
- Our Friend the Atom
- Pandora's Promise
- Parmanu: The Story of Pokhran
- Protect and Survive
- Radio Bikini
- Resan
- The Return of Navajo Boy
- Rokkasho Rhapsody
- Silent Storm
- Target Nevada
- Trinity and Beyond: The Atomic Bomb Movie
- Uranium – Twisting the Dragon's Tail
- White Horse
- White Light/Black Rain: The Destruction of Hiroshima and Nagasaki
- Windscale: Britain’s Biggest Nuclear Disaster
- War and Peace
- The War Game (1966 BBC)

== Dramatic films ==
- A Boy and His Dog (1975) – the story of a boy and his talking dog in a post-apocalyptic world.
- Aman (1967) - the story of a UK-trained Indian doctor who moves to Japan to treat patients suffering after the nuclear attack.
- Amazing Grace and Chuck (1987) – a 12-year-old boy becomes anxious after seeing a Minuteman missile on a school field trip. He protests the existence of nuclear weapons by refusing to play baseball.
- The Atomic Cafe (1982) – collection of the 1940s and 1950s United States government-issued propaganda films designed to reassure Americans that the atomic bomb was not a threat to their safety
- The Atomic Kid (1954) – a man is in a house within the danger area of a nuclear bomb test area when the bomb is activated.
- Atomic Twister (ABC, made-for-TV) – a film about a modern automated power plant in the path of a tornado which threatens the plant
- Barefoot Gen (1983) – an anime film based on a manga series which depicts the terror of the atomic bombing of Hiroshima during World War II from the perspective of a child. Although in slow motion, the film is notable for featuring an accurate representation of the bomb's explosion and the effects it had on Hiroshima's people.
- Battle Beneath the Earth (1967) – a discovery that Communist China, using innovative tunneling vehicles, is tunneling under the U.S. to place nuclear bombs in strategic locations, results in a U.S. effort to foil the plan and defeat them.
- The Bed Sitting Room (1969) – an absurdist, post-apocalyptic, satirical black comedy set in the ruins of London on a recent anniversary of the nuclear war.
- The Bedford Incident (1965) – a U.S. destroyer finds a Soviet Submarine and a false alarm causes trouble for the crew on board the ship.
- The Beginning or the End (1947) – a fictionalized docudrama about the Manhattan Project and the nuclear bombing of Hiroshima.
- Black Rain - based on the novel of the same name by Masuji Ibuse, the film centers on the atomic bombing of Hiroshima and its effects on the lives of one family.
- Broken Arrow (1996) – a film about two friends in the United States Air Force, who become bitter enemies after one of them steals two nuclear weapons and gives the U.S. government an ultimatum: either pay a huge ransom, or he will destroy a major U.S. city.
- By Dawn's Early Light (HBO, 1990) – about rogue Soviet military officials framing NATO for a nuclear attack in order to spark a full-blown nuclear war
- A Carol for Another Christmas (1964) – The Ghost of Christmas Future gives a tour across a desolate landscape of the ruins of a once-great civilization (Hiroshima).
- The Children's Story (1982) – this short film, which originally aired on TV's Mobil Showcase, depicts the first day of indoctrination of an elementary school classroom by a new teacher, representing a totalitarian government that has taken over the United States. It is based on the 1960 short story of the same name by James Clavell.
- The China Syndrome – this has been described as a "gripping 1979 drama about the dangers of nuclear power", which had an extra impact when the real-life accident at the Three Mile Island nuclear plant occurred several weeks after the film opened. Jane Fonda plays a TV reporter who witnesses fears over risk of a meltdown (the "China syndrome" of the title) at a local nuclear plant, which was averted by a quick-thinking engineer. The plot suggests that corporate greed and cost-cutting "have led to potentially deadly faults in the plant's construction".
- The Cloud (2006) – German drama film in which two teenagers try to survive after a nuclear accident.
- Chernobyl (miniseries) (HBO, Sky, 2019) – a five-part historical drama television miniseries, dramatizes the story of the 1986 Chernobyl nuclear disaster
- Confessions of a Dangerous Mind (2002) – in this movie directed by George Clooney, the CIA approaches an actor who becomes an assassin that kills some of America's enemies.
- Copenhagen (BBC, 2002) - British television drama film based on the play of the same name, about a meeting between the physicists Niels Bohr and Werner Heisenberg in Copenhagen in 1941.
- In This Corner of the World (2016) – and its extended version In This Corner (and Other Corners) of the World (2019) describe nature and traditional culture in Japan are and contrast them with the cruel and irredeemable scenes brought by the war.
- Countdown to Looking Glass (HBO, 1984) – a film that presents a simulated news broadcast about a nuclear war
- Crimson Tide (1995) – a suspenseful drama about a nuclear submarine, and the mutiny of its Executive Officer, regarding decisions on whether to launch a nuclear missile
- Damnation Alley (20th Century Fox, 1977) – a surprise attack launched on the United States, and the subsequent efforts of a small band of survivors in California to reach another group of survivors in Albany, New York
- The Dark Knight Rises (2012) – an entire metropolitan city is taken hostage as masked mercenary takes hold of a fully armed neutron bomb.
- The Day After (1983) – this made-for-television-movie by ABC depicts the consequences of a nuclear war in Lawrence, Kansas and the surrounding area.
- The Day the Earth Caught Fire (1961) – a drama about nuclear tests that throw the Earth off its course around the Sun, dooming it unless scientists can find a way to reverse the change, and a news team that covers the affair
- The Day the Fish Came Out (1967)
- Day One (CBS, 1989) – made-for-TV docudrama about the Manhattan Project
- The Dead Zone (1983) – a school teacher acquires psychic powers then learns a political candidate will order a nuclear strike at some point in the future
- Deterrence (film) (1999) – depicting fictional events about nuclear brinkmanship involving the United States and the dropping of a nuclear bomb on Baghdad, Iraq.
- Dirty War (BBC/HBO, 2004) – follows the journey of a radioactive isotope into England, where it is ultimately turned into multiple dirty bombs and detonated in central London. Meanwhile, the city of London conducts preparedness drills for a possible terrorist attack
- Disaster at Silo 7 (1988).
- The Divide (2011) – survivors of a nuclear attack are grouped together for days in the basement of their apartment building, where fear and dwindling supplies wear away at their dynamic.
- Dr. Strangelove or: How I Learned to Stop Worrying and Love the Bomb (1964) – a black comedy film that satirizes the Cold War and the threat of nuclear warfare
- Der Dritte Weltkrieg ("World War III") (1998) – a German/American TV mockumentary of an alternate history in which Soviet hard-liners oust Mikhail Gorbachev with the Iron Curtain intact, soon initiating a conventional war which accidentally triggers a full nuclear exchange; the film then rewinds to the point of divergence and ends with jubilant scenes from the "different path" of our history.
- Edge of Darkness (1985) - is a British television drama serial produced by BBC Television in 1985. It revolves around a widowed policeman whose investigations soon lead him into a murky world of government and corporate cover-ups and nuclear espionage.
- Enola Gay: The Men, the Mission, the Atomic Bomb (NBC, 1980) – made-for-television docudrama about the Army Air Force B-29 unit that dropped the first atomic bomb to be used in combat on Hiroshima, Japan at the end of World War II.
- Fail-Safe (1964) – a film based on the novel of the same name about an American bomber crew and nuclear tensions
- Fail-Safe (CBS, 2000) – a remake of the 1964 film, broadcast live and in black-and-white
- Fat Man and Little Boy a.k.a. Shadow Makers (1989) – film that reenacts the Manhattan Project
- Five (1951) – Four men and a woman together are apparent sole survivors of a global nuclear holocaust.
- The Fourth Protocol (1987) – A Cold War thriller in which a rogue Soviet plot smuggles a nuclear device into Britain to trigger political chaos and weaken NATO.
- Friend of the World (2020) – Trapped in a bunker, a filmmaker and a military general piece together the cause of nuclear war.
- A Gathering of Eagles (1963) – a Strategic Air Command B-52 wing commander must shape up his unit to pass a tough inspection, sacrificing friendships and happiness at home to ensure the wing can accomplish its mission.
- Godzilla – atomic tests in the South Pacific awakens a huge, prehistoric, aquatic reptile that threatens to destroy Japan.
- Goldeneye (1995) – tells the story of a Russian terrorist group trying to settle a score in England by capturing two secret Soviet nuclear EMP weapon and detonating them across the globe
- Goldfinger (1964) – a businessman plans to irradiate America's gold supply with a dirty bomb.
- Hava Aney Dey (2004) – Indian drama film by Partho Sen-Gupta about a future nuclear war between Indian and Pakistan.
- The Heavy Water War (2015) - a Norwegian/Danish/British TV drama based on the true story of the Norwegian heavy water sabotage in the 1940s.
- The Hero: Love Story of a Spy (2003) – Indian spy thriller film by Anil Sharma about a Research and Analysis Wing (RAW) agent who must stop terrorists from gaining access to a nuclear bomb.
- A House of Dynamite (2025) - an American thriller depicting the U.S. government response to a single nuclear weapon launched by an unidentified enemy.
- The Hunt for Red October (1990) – based on Tom Clancy's 1984 bestseller of the same title. It involves a Soviet naval captain who wants to defect to the United States with his crew and with the Soviet's most advanced nuclear missile submarine.
- I Am Cuba (1964) – a Cuban-Soviet film that encompasses the lives of everyday Cubans during the Cuban Missile Crisis.
- Iranium – a movie about the nuclear weapons program of Iran
- K-19: The Widowmaker (2002) – covers the Soviet submarine K-19 nuclear accident
- Ladybug, Ladybug (1963) – During the 1962 Cuban Missile Crisis, teachers at a secluded countryside elementary school are asked to walk their pupils home after a nuclear bomb warning alarm sounds.
- Lucky Dragon No. 5 (1959)
- The Manhattan Project (1986) – though not about a nuclear war, this was seen as a cautionary tale.
- Matinee (1993 film) – this film takes place during the Cuban Missile Crisis and dramatizes the lives of Americans about to meet their impending doom.
- Miracle Mile (1988) – a film about two lovers in Los Angeles leading up to a nuclear war
- Mission: Impossible – The Final Reckoning (2025) - follows a sentient artificial intelligence that gains control of the world's nuclear weapons in an attempt to wipe out humanity
- Nightbreaker (1989)
- On the Beach (1959) – film depicting a gradually dying, post-apocalyptic world in Australia that remained after a nuclear Third World War
- On the Beach (Showtime, 2000) – a remake of the 1959 film.
- One Night Stand (1984) – an Australian film directed and written by John Duigan. Four teenagers are in the Sydney Opera House when news breaks of a U.S.-Soviet conflict in Europe that quickly goes nuclear – first in Europe, and soon in Australia as well.
- Oppenheimer (2023) - The story of American scientist, J. Robert Oppenheimer, and his role in the development of the atomic bomb.
- Outside the Wire (2021) – In the near future, a drone pilot sent into a war zone finds himself paired up with a top-secret android officer on a mission to stop a nuclear attack.
- Pandora (2016) – South Korean disaster film about a nuclear power plant.
- Panic in Year Zero (1961) – a man on a camping trip with his family takes actions to protect them from looters and cutthroats, in a no-law, no-authorities public panic situation caused by a nuclear bomb attack nearby, but a safe distance from him and his family.
- Parmanu: The Story of Pokhran (Atom, 2018) – Indian historical drama film by Abhishek Sharma based on Pokhran-II, the Indian nuclear weapons test at Pokhran in 1998.
- The Peacemaker (1997) – a U.S. Army colonel and a civilian nuclear expert supervising him must track down a stolen Russian nuclear weapon before it is used by terrorists.
- Planet of the Apes (1968) – this, and two of its sequels depict Earth after being destroyed in a nuclear war, while two middle sequels depict Earth before such a war.
- Race for the Bomb (1987)
- The Rainbow Warrior (ABC, 1993)
- Red Alert (1977) – an investigator must fight both a saboteur and the plant’s own computer after an emergency at a nuclear power plant.
- Right at Your Door (2007) – a thriller about a couple in Los Angeles following multiple dirty bomb detonations.
- The Sacrifice (Sweden, 1986) – a philosophical drama about nuclear war
- Silkwood (1983) – inspired by the true-life story of Karen Silkwood, who died in a suspicious car accident while investigating alleged wrongdoing at the Kerr-McGee plutonium plant where she worked
- SOS Pacific (1959) – the survivors of a plane crash land on an island close to a hydrogen bomb set to go off in a few hours
- Space Cowboys (2000) – a space drama film; four older "ex-test pilots" are sent into space to repair an old Soviet satellite, unaware that it is armed with nuclear missiles.
- Special Bulletin (1983) – a gripping NBC drama about some anti-nuke activists who ironically threaten to detonate a nuclear device in Charleston, South Carolina
- Split Second (1953) – an escaped killer and his two partners hold a few people hostage in a ghost town that is scheduled to be destroyed by a nuclear bomb.
- The Sum of All Fears (2002) – a tale of terrorists' attempts to cause a nuclear war between the U.S. and Russia
- Superman IV: The Quest for Peace (1987) – Superman rounds up the world's nuclear weapons and hurls them into the Sun, resulting in unintended consequences.
- Testament (1983) – depicts the after-effects of a nuclear war in a town near San Francisco, California
- Thirteen Days (2000) – tells the story of the Cuban Missile Crisis of 1962
- Threads (BBC, 1984) – this film, set in the British city of Sheffield, shows the long-term results of a nuclear war on the surrounding area.
- Tirangaa (Tricolour, 1993) – Indian action drama film by Mehul Kumar depicting the abduction of Indian nuclear scientists by a terrorist leader who wants to build nuclear missiles for an invasion of India.
- True Lies (1994)
- Twilight's Last Gleaming (1977) – tells the story of Lawrence Dell, a renegade USAF general, who escapes from a military prison and takes over an ICBM silo near Montana, threatening to launch the missiles and start World War III unless the President reveals a top secret document to the American people about the Vietnam War
- Under Siege (1992) – movie about arms dealers who take over a U.S. Navy battleship, and attempt to sell the ship's nuclear-tipped Tomahawk Cruise Missiles on the black market
- Vikram (1986) – Indian action adventure film by Rajasekhar about a Research and Analysis Wing agent who has to retrieve AgniPutra, a stolen nuclear-capable Indian ICBM.
- The War Game (BBC, 1965) – an early drama-documentary that depicts the effects of a nuclear war in Britain following a conventional war that escalates to nuclear war
- WarGames (1983) – about a young computer hacker who accidentally hacks into a defense computer and risks starting a nuclear war
- Watchmen (2009) – an alternate universe superhero film based on the DC comic book set in the year 1985 at the height of the Cold War. During the Soviet invasion of Afghanistan, the superpowered Dr. Manhattan acts as America's symbolic nuclear deterrent.
- When the Wind Blows (1986) – an animated film about an elderly British couple in a post-nuclear war world
- The Wolf's Call (2019) - Film about a submarine's sonar operator, who must use his brilliant sense of hearing to track down a French ballistic missile submarine and end the threat of nuclear war.
- The World Is Not Enough (1999) – tells the story of a terrorist stealing a nuclear bomb in order to create an accident with a stolen nuclear submarine
- The World, the Flesh and the Devil (1959 film), Harry Belafonte survives global irradiation by being inadvertently trapped in a collapsed mine.

== See also ==
- Environmental issues in film and television
- International Uranium Film Festival
- List of books about nuclear issues
- List of films about renewable energy
- List of nuclear holocaust fiction
- List of songs about nuclear war and weapons
- Nuclear weapons in popular culture
