= Pahute Mesa =

Nuclear test area in Nye County, Nevada, US

Coordinates: 37.2609°N 116.6726°W

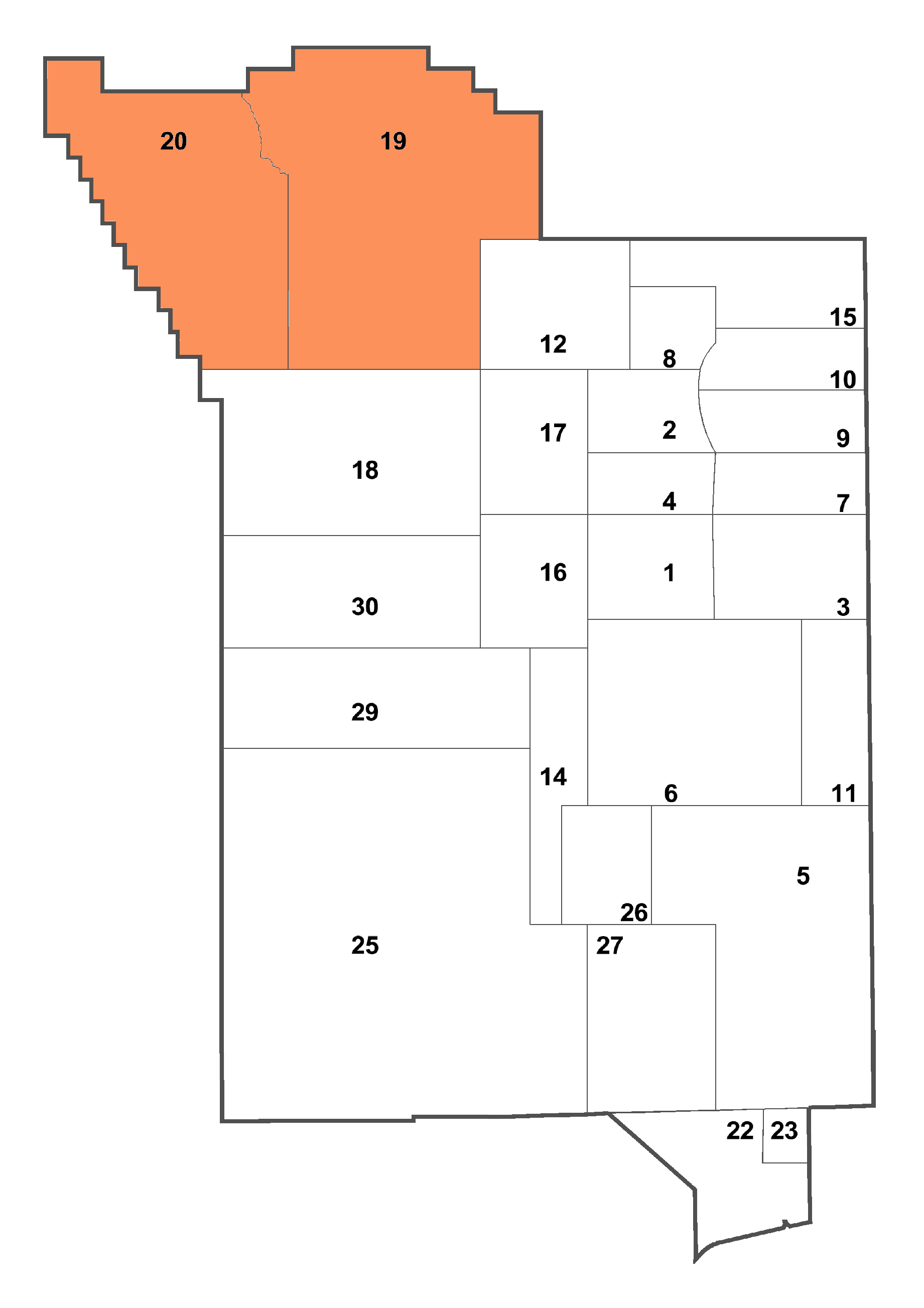
Location of Pahute Mesa within the Nevada National Security Site

Pahute Mesa or Paiute Mesa is one of four major nuclear test regions within the Nevada National Security Site (NNSS). It occupies 243 square miles (630 km^{2}) in the northwest corner of the NNSS in Nevada. The eastern section is known as Area 19 and the western section as Area 20.

== History ==
The Partial Test Ban Treaty of 1963 banned atmospheric nuclear testing. This led to a requirement for an underground test area that could accommodate higher yield tests than Yucca Flat.

Pahute Mesa was seen as ideal due to its geology and distance of over 160 kilometers (99 mi) from Las Vegas. Holes can be drilled to a depth of more than 1,370 meters (4,490 ft). This allows tests in the megaton range to be fully contained with minimal ground motion being felt in Las Vegas.

Pahute Mesa was thus incorporated into the boundary of the NNSS in late 1963 under an agreement between the United States Atomic Energy Commission and the U.S. Air Force.

== Geology and climate ==
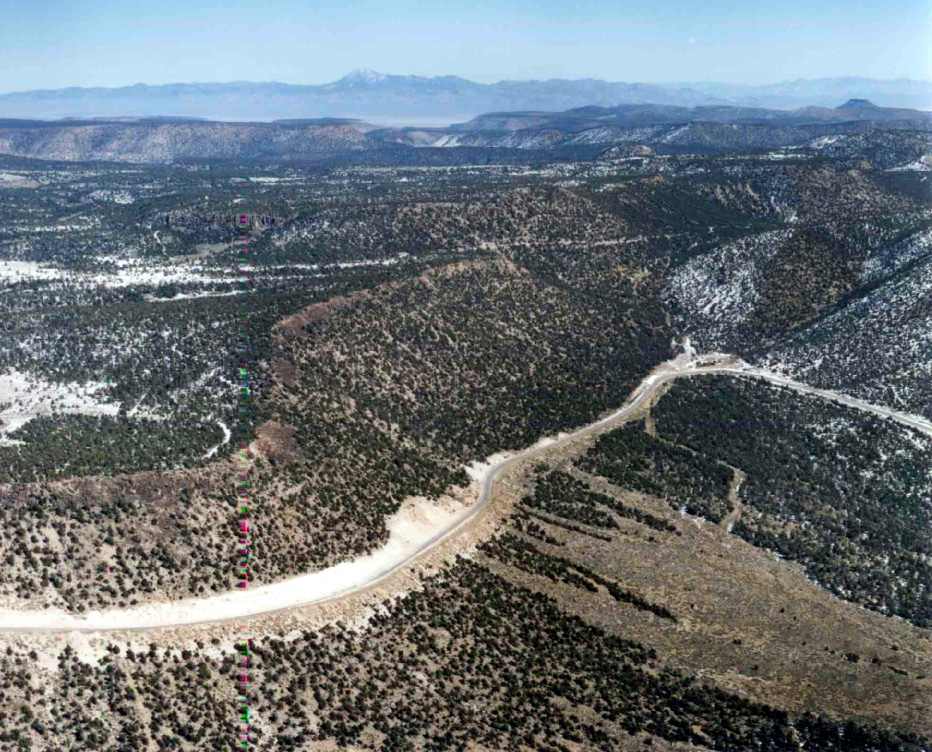
Aerial view of Pahute Mesa

Pahute Mesa is part of the Tonopah Basin and includes the Silent Canyon caldera complex of the Southwest Nevada volcanic field.

Rugged terrain features and harsh winter conditions make year-round operations difficult.

== Nuclear testing ==
A total of 85 nuclear tests were conducted in Pahute Mesa between 1965 and 1992. Three of them—Boxcar, Benham and Handley—had a yield of over one megaton. Three tests were conducted as part of operation Plowshare and one as part of Vela Uniform.

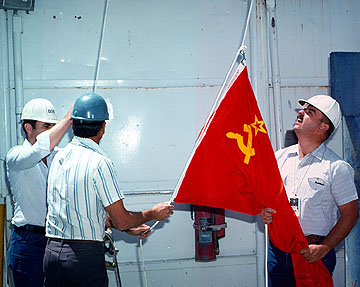
The Soviet Union flag is raised to the top of the emplacement tower to be flown beside the U.S. flag for the Kearsarge test.

In 1988, as a prelude to the signing of the protocols to the Threshold Test Ban Treaty and the Peaceful Nuclear Explosions Treaty, the United States and the Soviet Union conducted two joint tests employing proposed treaty verification techniques. The first was Kearsarge, conducted in Area 19 of the NNSS, the second Shagan, conducted at the Semipalatinsk Test Site.

=== Radioactive contamination ===
The following tests resulted in a release of radioactivity that was detected outside of the NNSS.

Test	Date	Type	Purpose	Location	Atmospheric release of iodine-131
Palanquin	1965-04-14	Crater	Plowshare	Area 20	910 kilocuries (34 PBq)
Cabriolet	1968-01-26	Crater	Plowshare	Area 20	6 kilocuries (0.22 PBq)
Schooner	1968-12-08	Crater	Plowshare	Area 20	15 kilocuries (0.56 PBq)

The Schooner plume spread plutonium and other radionuclides across Area 20 and northward into Nellis Air Force Range. According to measurements taken in 2001, the Schooner crater has the highest annual mean concentration of radioactive tritiated water of any area of the NNSS.

== Other uses ==
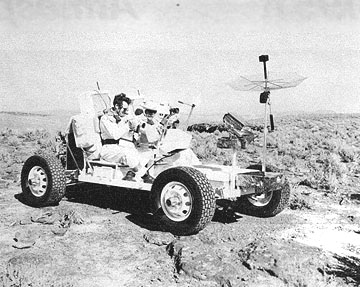
Apollo 16 astronauts train in the Lunar rover by driving over a near-lunar landscape at the Schooner crater site in Area 20

The Schooner crater area resembles the lunar landscape. It was used along with other areas of the NNSS to train some of the astronauts of the Apollo program, among them Neil Armstrong, Dick Gordon, Buzz Aldrin, Dave Scott and Rusty Schweickart. In 1970, the Apollo 16 team of John Young and Charlie Duke trained at Schooner in the lunar rover. In May 2023, NASA returned to Schooner to test lunar equipment for the Artemis program.

== Supporting infrastructure ==
The Pahute Control Point is located in Area 18, south of Pahute Mesa. It was used until 1971 to monitor tests in Pahute Mesa.

The Pahute Mesa Airstrip, also in Area 18, was used to ship supplies and equipment to Pahute Mesa.
