= Nuclear Tipping Point =

- Directed by: Ben Goddard
- Written by: Ben Goddard
- Produced by: Nuclear Threat Initiative
- Starring: Henry Kissinger; George Shultz; Sam Nunn; William Perry; Colin Powell
- Narrated by: Michael Douglas
- Cinematography: Bill Harrison
- Edited by: Aaron Goddard
- Music by: Pete Kneser
- Release date: January 27, 2010
- Running time: 56 minutes

Nuclear Tipping Point is a 2010 documentary film produced by the Nuclear Threat Initiative. It features interviews with four American government officials who were in office during the Cold War period, but are now advocating for the elimination of nuclear weapons: Henry Kissinger, George Shultz, Sam Nunn, and William Perry. Michael Douglas narrated the film.

These "Four Cold Warriors", who each contributed in important ways to the nuclear arms race, built on classical deterrence theory, now argue that we must eliminate all nuclear weapons or face disaster on an enormous scale. Former secretary Kissinger puts the new danger this way: "The classical notion of deterrence was that there was some consequences before which aggressors and evildoers would recoil. In a world of suicide bombers, that calculation doesn’t operate in any comparable way". Shultz has said, "If you think of the people who are doing suicide attacks, and people like that get a nuclear weapon, they are almost by definition not deterrable".

The film was screened at the White House on April 6, 2010.

== See also ==
- List of films about nuclear issues
  - Countdown to Zero
- Nuclear weapons debate
