= Operation Ranger =

Series of 1950s US nuclear tests

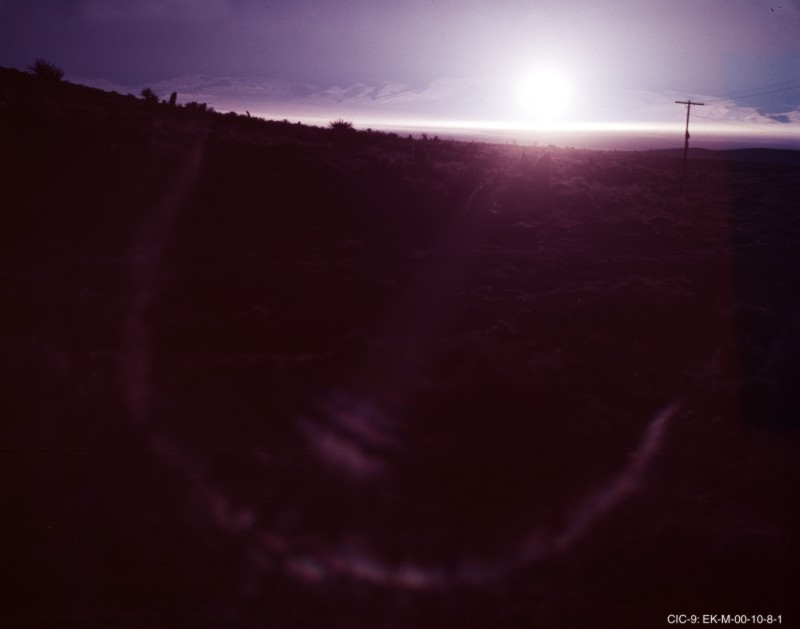
- Ranger Able, 1 kiloton.

Information
- Country: United States
- Test site: NTS Areas 5, 11, Frenchman Flat
- Period: 1951
- Number of tests: 5
- Test type: free air drop
- Max. yield: 22 kilotonnes of TNT (92 TJ)

Test series chronology

Operation Ranger was the fourth American nuclear test series. It was conducted in 1951 and was the first series to be carried out at the Nevada Test Site. All the bombs were dropped by B-50D bombers of the 4925th Atomic Test Group, exploded in the open air over Frenchman Flat (Area 5).

These tests centered on the practicality of developing a second generation of nuclear weapons using smaller amounts of valuable nuclear materials. They were planned under the name Operation Faust.

The exact locations of the tests are unknown, as they were all air drops. However, the planned ground zero was set at 36°49′32″N 115°57′54″W for all except the Fox shot, which was "500 feet [150 m] west and 300 feet [91 m] south" in order to minimize damage to the control point.

Footage of the Buster-Jangle Baker test is often mislabeled as belonging to the Ranger Able test. Both shots can be told apart because the Buster Baker test was conducted at Yucca Flat in the daytime, meanwhile Ranger Able was conducted at Frenchman Flat in the nighttime. No motion picture of Operation Ranger has ever been declassified.

== History ==
The primary purpose of Operation Ranger was to perform experiments in preparation for Operation Greenhouse. As the device to be tested in Greenhouse was in the stockpiling stage with respect to its high explosive system, it was felt that the entire test series could be performed using air dropped weapons.

The test led to the establishment of the Nevada Proving Ground (later Nevada Test Site, now Nevada National Security Site or NNSS). Following this test series it was believed appropriate to conduct tests up to approximately 60 kilotonnes of TNT (250 TJ) at Nevada instead of at the Pacific Proving Ground.

== Shots ==
United States' Ranger series tests and detonations
Name (Note: The US, France and Great Britain have code-named their test events, while the USSR and China did not, and therefore have only test numbers (with some exceptions – Soviet peaceful explosions were named). Word translations into English in parentheses unless the name is a proper noun. A dash followed by a number indicates a member of a salvo event. The US also sometimes named the individual explosions in such a salvo test, which results in "name1 – 1(with name2)". If test is canceled or aborted, then the row data like date and location discloses the intended plans, where known.)	Date time (UT)	Local time zone (Note: To convert the UT time into standard local, add the number of hours in parentheses to the UT time; for local daylight saving time, add one additional hour. If the result is earlier than 00:00, add 24 hours and subtract 1 from the day; if it is 24:00 or later, subtract 24 hours and add 1 to the day. Historical time zone data obtained from the IANA time zone database.)	Location (Note: Rough place name and a latitude/longitude reference; for rocket-carried tests, the launch location is specified before the detonation location, if known. Some locations are extremely accurate; others (like airdrops and space blasts) may be quite inaccurate. "~" indicates a likely pro-forma rough location, shared with other tests in that same area.)	Elevation + height (Note: Elevation is the ground level at the point directly below the explosion relative to sea level; height is the additional distance added or subtracted by tower, balloon, shaft, tunnel, air drop or other contrivance. For rocket bursts the ground level is "N/A". In some cases it is not clear if the height is absolute or relative to ground, for example, Plumbbob/John. No number or units indicates the value is unknown, while "0" means zero. Sorting on this column is by elevation and height added together.)	Delivery, (Note: Atmospheric, airdrop, balloon, gun, cruise missile, rocket, surface, tower, and barge are all disallowed by the Partial Nuclear Test Ban Treaty. Sealed shaft and tunnel are underground, and remained useful under the PTBT. Intentional cratering tests are borderline; they occurred under the treaty, were sometimes protested, and generally overlooked if the test was declared to be a peaceful use.) Purpose (Note: Include weapons development, weapon effects, safety test, transport safety test, war, science, joint verification and industrial/peaceful, which may be further broken down.)	Device (Note: Designations for test items where known, "?" indicates some uncertainty about the preceding value, nicknames for particular devices in quotes. This category of information is often not officially disclosed.)	Yield (Note: Estimated energy yield in tons, kilotons, and megatons. A ton of TNT equivalent is defined as 4.184 gigajoules (1 gigacalorie).)	Fallout (Note: Radioactive emission to the atmosphere aside from prompt neutrons, where known. The measured species is only iodine-131 if mentioned, otherwise it is all species. No entry means unknown, probably none if underground and "all" if not; otherwise notation for whether measured on the site only or off the site, where known, and the measured amount of radioactivity released.)	References	Notes
Able	January 27, 1951 13:44:51.0	PST (–8 hrs)	NTS Area 5 ~ 36.82664°N 115.95883°W	1,010 m (3,310 ft) + 323 m (1,060 ft)	free air drop, weapons development	Mk-4, Type D	1 kt	I-131 venting detected, 1.3 MCi (48 PBq)		First test over continental United States since Trinity. Testing compression against critical mass as inspired by the demon core. Often later used for a 1 kt calibrated explosion. See also Ranger Easy.
Baker 1	January 28, 1951 13:52:04.5	PST (–8 hrs)	NTS Area 5 ~ 36.82664°N 115.95883°W	1,010 m (3,310 ft) + 329 m (1,079 ft)	free air drop, weapons development	Mk-4, Type D, TOM Init	8 kt	I-131 venting detected, 3.2 MCi (120 PBq)		Fractional critical core, TOM initiator. See also Ranger Easy.
Easy	February 1, 1951 13:46:39.5	PST (–8 hrs)	NTS Area 5 ~ 36.82664°N 115.95883°W	1,010 m (3,310 ft) + 329 m (1,079 ft)	free air drop, weapons development	Mk-4, Type D	1 kt			Testing compression against critical mass.
Baker 2	February 2, 1951 13:48:48.0	PST (–8 hrs)	NTS Area 5 ~ 36.82664°N 115.95883°W	1,010 m (3,310 ft) + 335 m (1,099 ft)	free air drop, weapons development	Mk-4, Type D	8 kt			Identical to Ranger Baker 1, test of reproducible results. See also Ranger Easy.
Fox	February 6, 1951 13:46:55.0	PST (–8 hrs)	NTS Area 5 36.82485°N 115.96708°W	1,010 m (3,310 ft) + 437 m (1,434 ft)	free air drop, weapons development	Mk-6 HOW, Type D "Freddy"	22 kt			Proof Test of Mark 6 HOW "Fox" core. "500 ft west and 300 ft south of drop target used by other Ranger blasts, to avoid damage to the control point.".

== Gallery ==
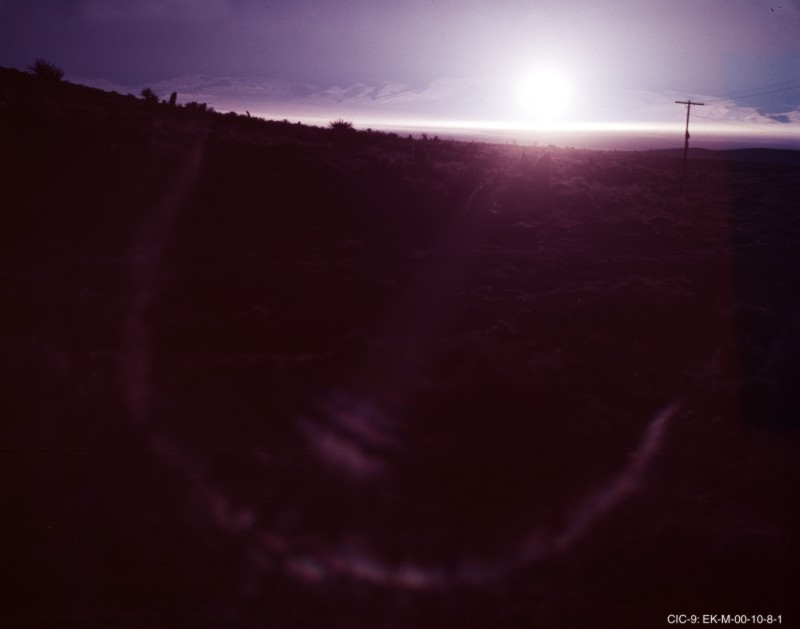
Ranger Able, 1 kiloton

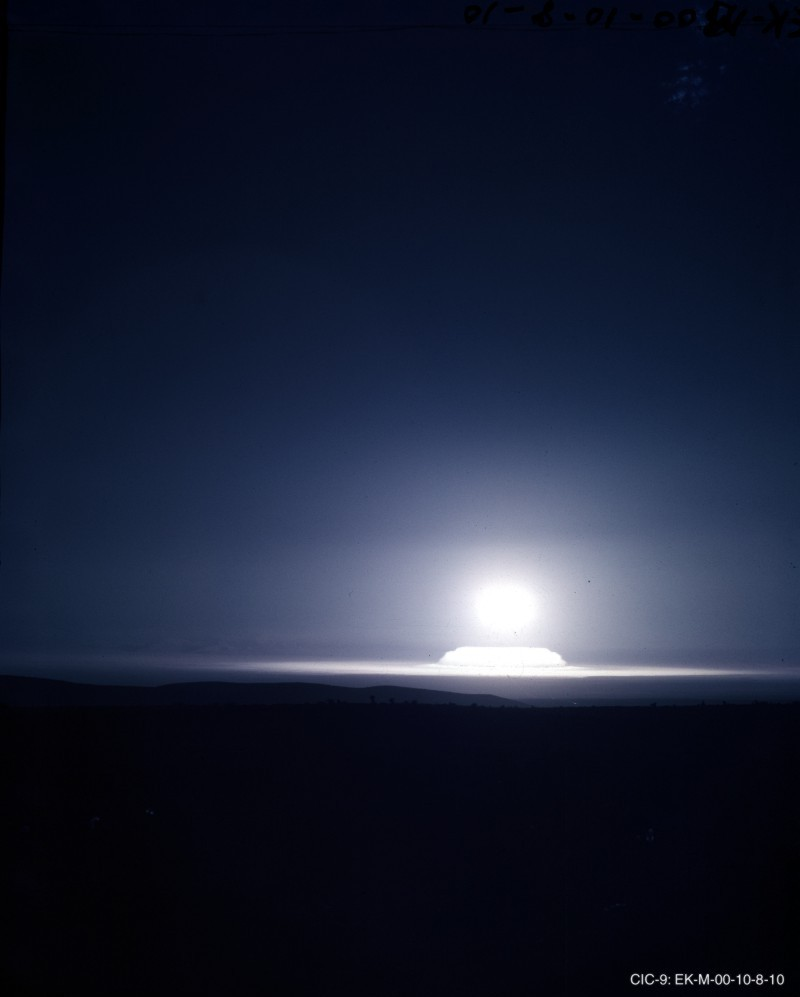
Ranger Baker 1, 8 kilotons

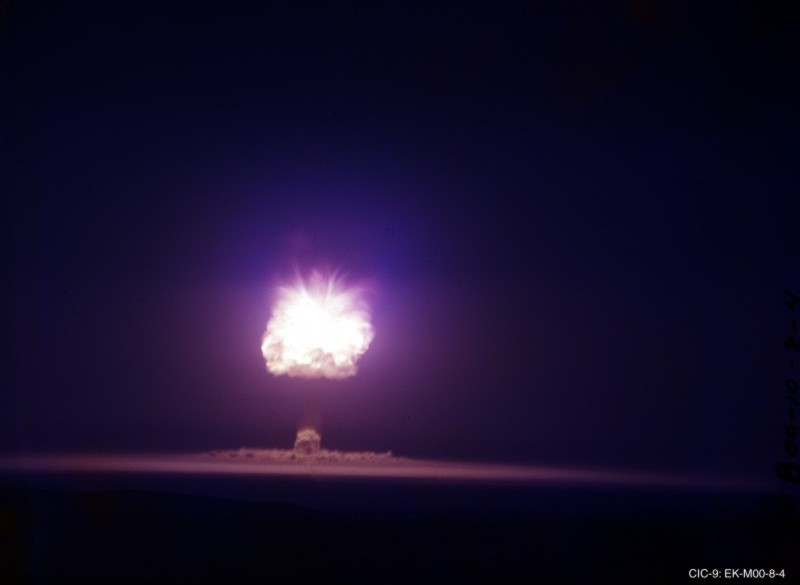
Ranger Fox, 22 kilotons.

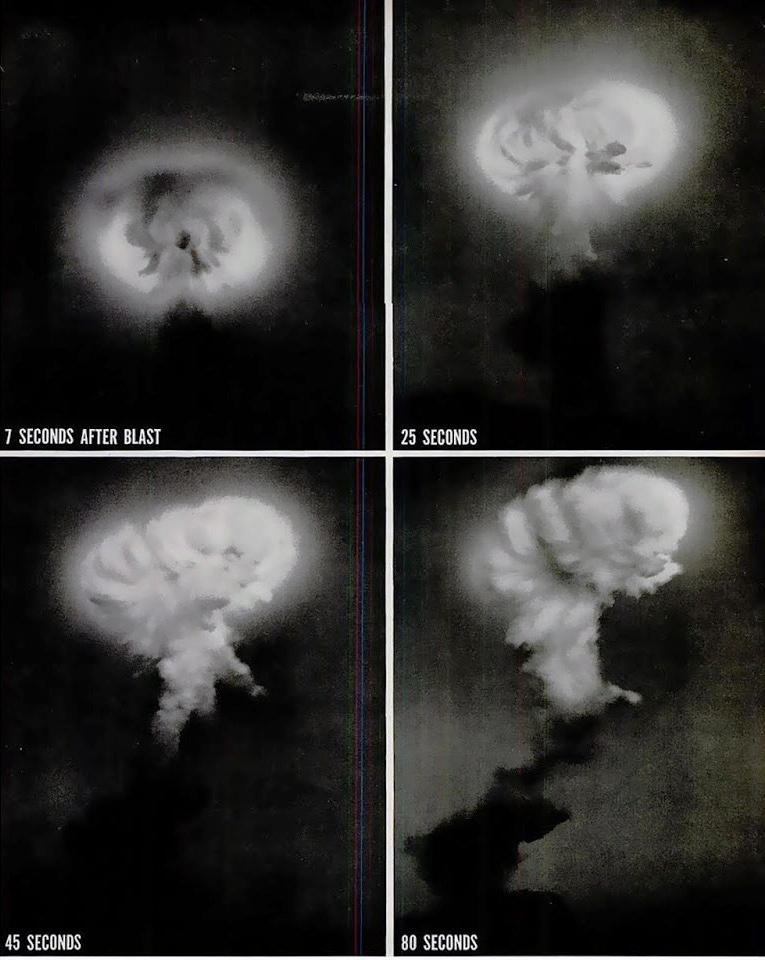
Ranger Fox mushroom cloud development.

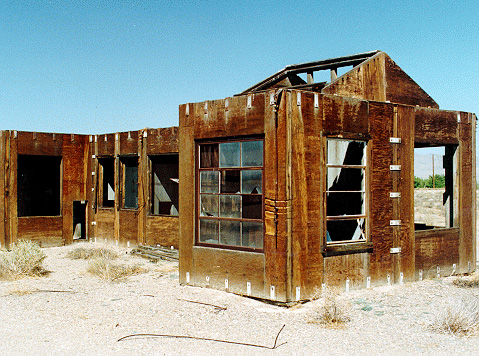
"Glass-House" structure built to determine blast effects on glazing and window construction, and to assess the problem of flying glass, test Ranger-Easy.

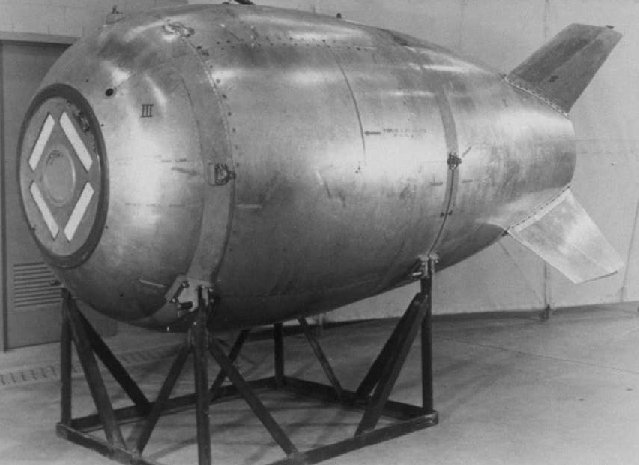
Mark 4 device as detonated in all Ranger tests, excluding test Fox.

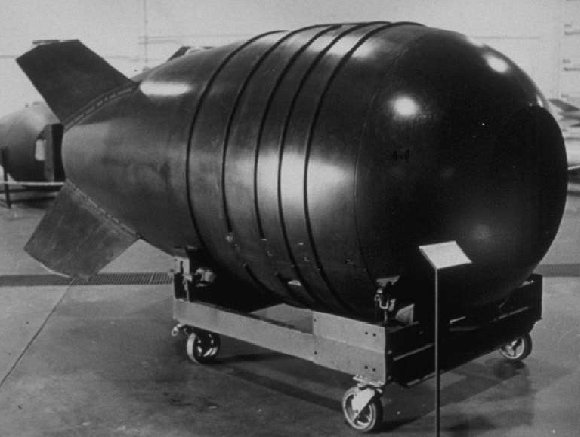
Mark 6 device as detonated in test Fox.

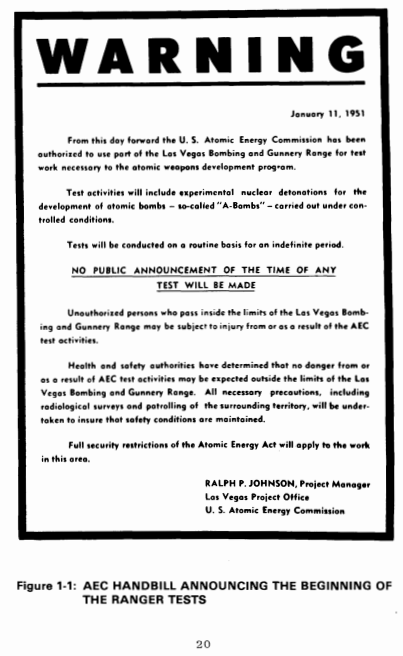
A AEC Handbill announcing the beginning of the ranger tests
