= Corsica Airfield Complex =

Airfield complex in Corsica

Corsica Airfield Complex
- Corsica in France
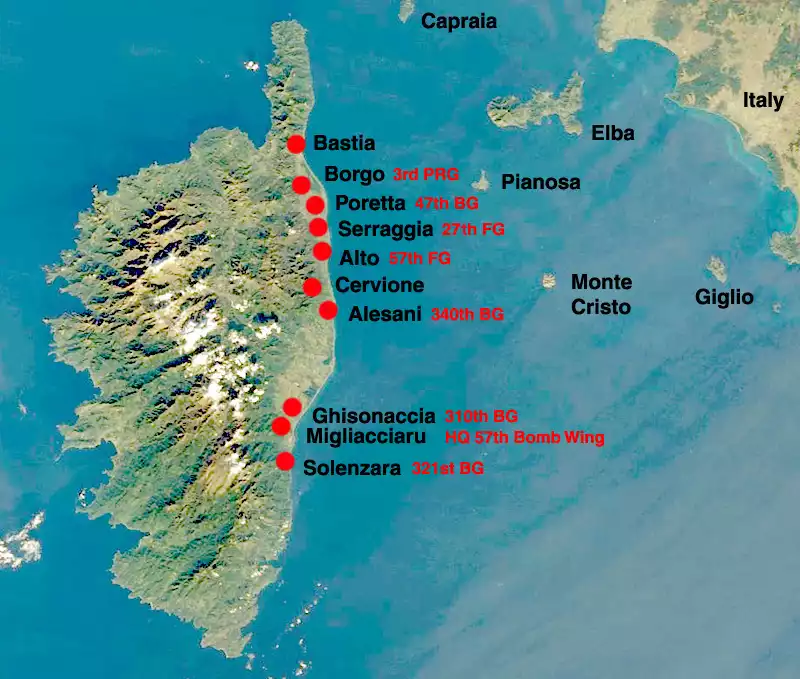
- Map of World War II airfields within 40 km (25 mi) of Corsica

Site information
- Type: Military airfields
- Operator: Regia Aeronautica; Free French Air Forces; United States Army Air Forces; Royal Air Force

Site history
- Built: 1920s–1945

Corsica Airfield Complex (also known as USS Corsica) is a complex of several airfields on the French island of Corsica. They were built during World War II and actively participated in campaigns against the Axis forces. When the war ended, the complex's role diminished and most airfields were subsequently abandoned.

== History ==
After France collapsed to the German Wehrmacht in 1940, Corsica came under rule of the Vichy France regime. In November 1942, the island was occupied by Italian and German forces because of the Anglo-American landings in North Africa. In September 1943 after the Italian armistice, Italian and Free French Forces pushed the Germans out of the island, making Corsica the first department to be freed. Subsequently, the US military established several airfields nicknamed "USS Corsica" to be served as bases for tactical bomber groups attacking on German-occupied targets. USS Corsica sheltered around 50,000 US soldiers and airmen, and operated as a strategic base towards the end of World War II.

- Airfields originally constructed in Corsica were Ajaccio Campu dell'Oro, Borgo, Corte, Casabianda, Calvi, and Ghisonaccia-Gare.
- Airfields built by the US military on the east coast were Bevinco, Poretta (Bastia), Serragia, Alto, Alesani, Aghione, and Solenzara.
- Airfields built by the US military on the west coast were Calvi Sainte Catherine, Calenzana, and Fiume Secco. The only airfield built midland was Ponte Leccia.
- Smaller airfields used by the Piper Cub aircraft were Abbazia, Popriano, and Porto Vecchio.

Many of these airfields were abandoned, while some are still active today.

== French airfields ==
Originally built by France were:

=== Ajaccio Campu dell'Oro ===
Location: 41°55′28″N 8°47′44″E

Ajaccio Napoléon Bonaparte Airport Corsican: Aeruportu di Aiacciu Nabulione Buonaparte (also known as Ajaccio Campu'dell'Oro) was originally built as a civil seaplane station on the south-west coast of Corsica. For several weeks beginning on 30 September 1943, the airfield experienced heavy bombings by the Luftwaffe. In 1944, the United States Army Air Forces (USAAF) occupied the airport and installed perforated metallic mats for the operation of P-51 Mustang fighter aircraft. The airfield's relatively short runway acted as a challenge for larger aircraft, and also due to the proximity of mountains.

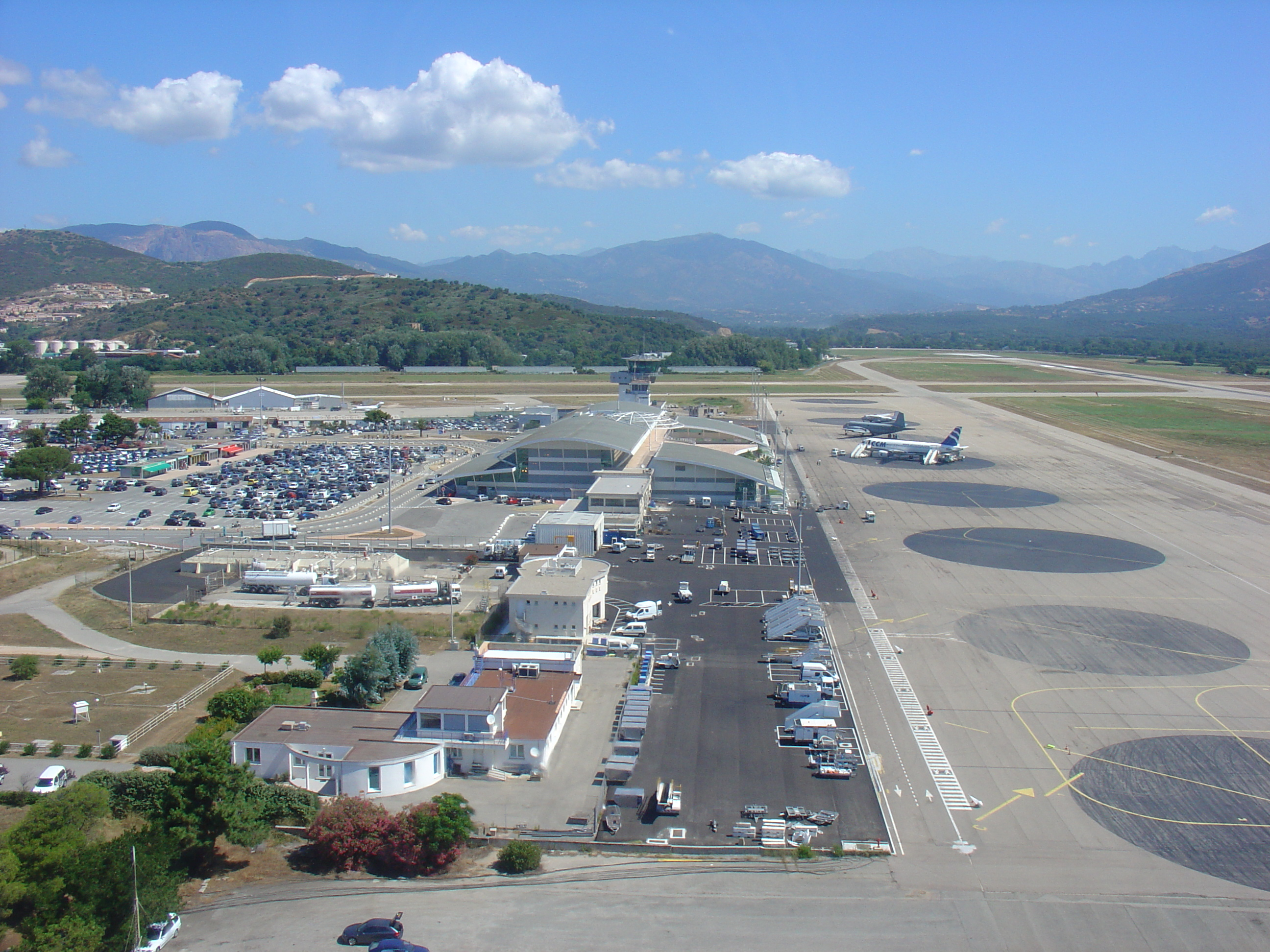
See also Ajaccio Napoleon Bonaparte Airport

Serves as the primary airport for Ajaccio on the Mediterranean island of Corsica, France. five kilometres (3.1 mi) east of Ajaccio's harbour in the Mediterranean Sea, the airport supports the capital of the Corse-du-Sud department. It is the main hub for the regional airline Air Corsica, offering flights to mainland France. Named in honor of Napoleon Bonaparte, a native of Ajaccio, the airport commemorates the island's most famous historical figure.

Infrastructure: Ajaccio consisted of two medium-sized hangars, repair shops, and small buildings possibly serving as offices. At the northern end of the quay were two cranes for lifting seaplanes in and out of the water.

Units:

- No. 154 (Motor Industries) Squadron RAF
- No. 232 Squadron RAF
- No. 242 (Canadian) Squadron RAF
- No. 243 Squadron RAF
- No. 283 Squadron RAF
- No. 326 (GC II/7 'Nice') Squadron RAF
- No. 327 (GC I/3 'Corse') Squadron RAF
- No. 328 (GC I/7 'Provence') Squadron RAF

The airfield today is known as Ajaccio Napoleon Bonaparte Airport.

=== Ajaccio Aspretto ===
Location: 41°55′20″N 8°45′45″E

Ajaccio Aspretto Airfield was originally built from 1929 to 1930 as a military seaplane station, two kilometres (1.2 mi) east from Ajaccio Campu'del Oru. Naval flying boats were moored to buoys in the harbour near a submarine base. On 30 September 1943, Luftwaffe units bombed the harbour and station facilities for several weeks as Allied ships arrived from Sardinia and North America.

Infrastructure: 1 large double hangar, repair facilities, control tower, offices, and barracks accommodating 320 personnel. The quay was operated by one heavy crane, one light crane, and one slipway.

=== Bastia-Borgo ===
Location: 42°34′31″N 9°27′10″E

Borgo Airfield was constructed from 1926 to 1930, when the French state addressed the need for a maritime airfield on 122 hectares (300 acres) of land that they had acquired. From 1937 to 1938, the airfield was supposed to operate with occasional transit aircraft by the Potez Company - Aero Service. However, this never materialized as the agreement was not signed. In February 1943, Italian reconnaissance aircraft arrived. From March to the beginning of October 1943, the airfield was heavily utilized by the Luftwaffe during World War II. During US occupation, the runway was deemed to be too small, and a larger one was constructed to the north. However, the runway was still used by the Piper Cub aircraft. Borgo Airfield was heavily used by the USAAF Twelfth Air Force. After the war in 1948, the airfield was abandoned.

Infrastructure: Borgo Airfield was operated on a 1,115 m × 825 m (3,658 ft × 2,707 ft) and a 1,280 m × 275 m (4,199 ft × 902 ft) grass strip

Units:

- 124a Squadron of Regia Aeronautica
- Luftwaffe (unknown) Junkers Ju 90, Junkers Ju 290
- 3rd Photographic Reconnaissance Group, Twelfth Air Force
- 57th Bomb Wing (operated but not assigned)
- 414th Night Fighter Squadron (Twelfth Air Force), 5 February–July 1944; 5 September – 13 October 1944, Bristol Beaufighter
- 527th Fighter Squadron, 86th Fighter Group (Twelfth Air Force), 12 July-23 September 1944, P-47 Thunderbolt
- 416th Night Fighter Squadron (Twelfth Air Force), 14–23 August 1944, P-61 Black Widow
- 417th Night Fighter Squadron (Twelfth Air Force), February–April 1944; 25 April – 7 September 1944, Bristol Beaufighter
- No. 6 Squadron RAF
- No. 253 (Hyderabad State) Squadron RAF
- No. 272 Squadron RAF
- No. 283 Squadron RAF
- No. 327 (GC I/3 'Corse') Squadron RAF
- No. 328 (GC I/7 'Provence') Squadron RAF
- No. 682 Squadron RAF

The airfield today is known as Bastia–Poretta Airport.

=== Corte ===
Location: 42°17′25″N 9°11′32″E

Corte Airport (also known as Aérodrome de Corte Corsican: Aerodromu di Cortu), was originally established around 1944 as a military airfield during World War II by the USAAF. It was used primarily for fighter and reconnaissance operations in support of Allied forces in Europe. After the war, the airfield was eventually decommissioned and fell out of active use.

It is a civil airport located near Corte, France (IATA: ICAO: LFKT). It has a single asphalt/concrete runway (950 m × 20 m, 3,117 ft × 66 ft) suitable for visual flight rules (VFR) only. The airport is at an elevation of 1,130 feet (340 m) and offers AVGAS fuel. However, it lacks customs, US pre-clearance, and lighting for night operations. Corte Airport operates under "French Fire category 1" and is not open 24 hours.

Infrastructure: 950 m × 20 m (3,117 ft × 66 ft), a single asphalt/concrete runway and two hangars south of the airfield

=== Casabianda ===
Location: 42°5′2″N 9°28′20″E

Casabianda Airfield (also known as Aérodrome de Casabianda) was proposed and approved on 17 March 1939, by the French Minister of Air, Guy La Chambre, who expected the arrival of heavy aircraft by June 1939. The airfield retained secretive operations, and was located on 77 hectares (190 acres) of land with runway 09/28 (915 m × 45 m, 3,002 ft × 148 ft pierced steel planking). In 1943–1944, Casabianda Airfield resumed operations as a US air base for secret intelligence missions. The airfield was operated by the USAAF for C-47 aircraft, and on 14 August 1944, the British escort carrier HMS Pursuer delivered four Grumman F6F Hellcat fighters to the airfield. Finally on 6 February 1947, the airfield closed operations, and was written off any official list of its existence. The airfield was never used by the Luftwaffe.

Infrastructure: 915 m × 45 m (3,002 ft × 148 ft) - 09/28, a single pierced steel planking runway and a control tower

Units:

- United States Army Air Forces, 1943–1944, C-47s

=== Calvi Fiume-Secco (Calvi) ===
Location: 42°33′00″N 8°48′00″E

Calvi Fiume-Secco Airfield (also known as Aérodrome de Calvi Fiume-Secco), located on the northwest coast of Corsica, was established by the French Army in 1935. Construction began in the summer of that year, with the land officially designated for public use on 6 May 1935. By March 1936, surfacing work was completed, and temporary hangars and barracks were added between August 1939 and February 1940. The airfield became operational for the French Air Force in September 1939.

During World War II, following the invasion of Vichy France, the Italian Army occupied the airfield until 1942. After Corsica's liberation in October 1943, the USAAF utilized the airfield, primarily for large-scale operations like the invasion of Southern France (Operation Dragoon) and as an emergency landing site for damaged aircraft. No USAAF units were permanently based there, and the airfield remained in use until the USAAF's departure in 1945.

From 1939 to 1940, the airfield was used by Royal Air Force (RAF) reconnaissance aircraft. In June 1944, the airfield was listed as operational by the Luftwaffe, although no activity by the force was recorded.

In October 1943, the USAAF acquired the airfield for Operation Dragoon, and it was used as an emergency landing field until the departure of the USAAF in 1945.

Calvi Fiume-Secco was initially unused until it reopened in September 1947 for slow and light aircraft, serving civil and commercial aviation and as a backup for the French Air Force.

Infrastructure: 760 m × 30 m (2,493 ft × 98 ft) prefabricated loadbearing surface runway, 980 m × 45 m (3,215 ft × 148 ft) pierced steel planking runway, three hangars and sheds located northwest of the airfield

=== Ghisonaccia-Gare ===
Location: 42°03′18″N 009°24′07″E

Ghisonaccia Airfield was constructed in late 1943 by the XII Engineer Command as an all-weather temporary field. The runway, taxiways and dispersals was constructed using Marston Matting.

Units:

- HQ 57th Bombardment Wing, 20 April–5 October 1944
- 310th Bombardment Group, 10 December 1943 – 7 April 1945, B-25 Mitchell
- 414th Night Fighter Squadron (Twelfth Air Force), 9 January–4 February 1944; 20 March–July 1944, Bristol Beaufighter
- 417th Night Fighter Squadron (Twelfth Air Force), 7 January–February 1944 (ground echelon only)
- No. 14 Squadron RAF
- No. 36 Squadron RAF
- No. 284 Squadron RAF
- No. 458 Squadron RAAF
- No. 500 (County of Kent) Squadron AAF

Infrastructure: Marston Matting for runways, taxiways and dispersals, billets, and an ammunition dump

After World War II, the airfield was handed over to the authorities, and had since been developed into a regional airport as Ghisonaccia Alzitone Airport.

== US airfields ==
=== Bevinco ===
Location: 42°36′30″N 009°27′22″E

Bevinco Airfield (also known as Bastia-Bevinco), located on Corsica's northeast coast. Constructed in 1944 as part of the Allies' strategy in Corsica during World War II. Built quickly to support air operations in the Mediterranean, it mainly served transport and support missions.

It also primarily served transport missions with C-47s for the Mediterranean Theater. The airfield also supported RAF Spitfire squadrons, facilitating logistics and resupply operations. Although it was operational in 1944, its usage declined post-war, and it was abandoned soon after. Remnants of Bevinco were still visible on aerial imagery from 1948.

Infrastructure: 1,200 m × 45 m (3,937 ft × 148 ft) - 35/17, a single prefabricated loadbearing surface runway and a control tower

Units:

- USAAF, C-47s

=== Poretta ===
Poretta Airfield begun construction in 1944 as engineers installed pierced steel planking. Shortly afterwards, the 47th Bombardment Group flew A-20 aircraft on bombing missions to ammunition dumps, oil storage facilities, and also disrupting sea transportation. In July 1944, the 321st Service Squadron moved from Orbetello Airfield to Poretta Airfield.

Units:

- 47th Bombardment Group, 1944, C-47s
- 321st Service Squadron, July 1944
- No. 154 (Motor Industries) Squadron RAF
- No. 232 Squadron RAF
- No. 237 (Rhodesia) Squadron RAF
- No. 238 Squadron RAF
- No. 242 (Canadian) Squadron RAF
- No. 243 Squadron RAF
- No. 451 Squadron RAAF

=== Serragia ===
Location: 42°29′15″N 009°30′00″E

Serragia Airfield (also known as Aérodrome de Serragia), located on the northeast coast of Corsica. Constructed during 1943, serving as a base for Allied forces during World War II. It was built to support the operations of bombers and fighter aircraft in the Mediterranean campaign, particularly in preparation for the invasion of southern France.

It was used during the war by Royal Australian Air Force (RAAF) and USAAF forces. The Australian No. 451 Squadron RAAF operated from there in 1944, conducting offensive operations. Later, it was taken over by the USAAF, supporting B-25 Mitchell bombers in the Southern France invasion (Operation Dragoon). The airfield closed in January 1945 and was dismantled after the war, with only remnants of its runway remaining.

Infrastructure: 1,850 m × 45 m (6,070 ft × 148 ft) - 18/36, a single pierced steel planking runway and a control tower (since demolished)

Units:

- 319th Bombardment Group, 21 September 1944 – 1 January 1945, B-25 Mitchell
- 27th Fighter Group, July–August 1944, Curtiss P-40 Warhawk, P-47 Thunderbolt
- 79th Fighter Group, 11 June–August 1944, P-47 Thunderbolt
- No. 237 (Rhodesia) Squadron RAF
- No. 238 Squadron RAF
- No. 451 Squadron RAAF, September 1944–January 1945, Spitfire

=== Alto ===
Location: 42°27′00″N 9°31′35″E

Alto Airfield (also known as Advanced Landing Ground Alto and Alto Air Base) was a temporary airfield constructed in early 1944. On 23 March 1944, the 57th fighter group was assigned to Alto Airfield, and landed with their P-47 Thunderbolts. The units participated in Operation Strangle against the German Army in Italy. The name was derived from the river that ran nearby, close to the village of Fovelli.

Units:

- 320th Bomb Group, Martin B-26 Marauders
- 57th Fighter Group, P-47 Thunderbolts
- No. 154 (Motor Industries) Squadron RAF
- No. 232 Squadron RAF
- No. 242 (Canadian) Squadron RAF
- No. 243 Squadron RAF

Infrastructure: Alto Airfield was operated by a 18/36 pierced steel planking 1,830 m × 50 m (6,000 ft × 160 ft) runway.

=== Alesani ===
Location: 42°16′40″N 9°33′15″E

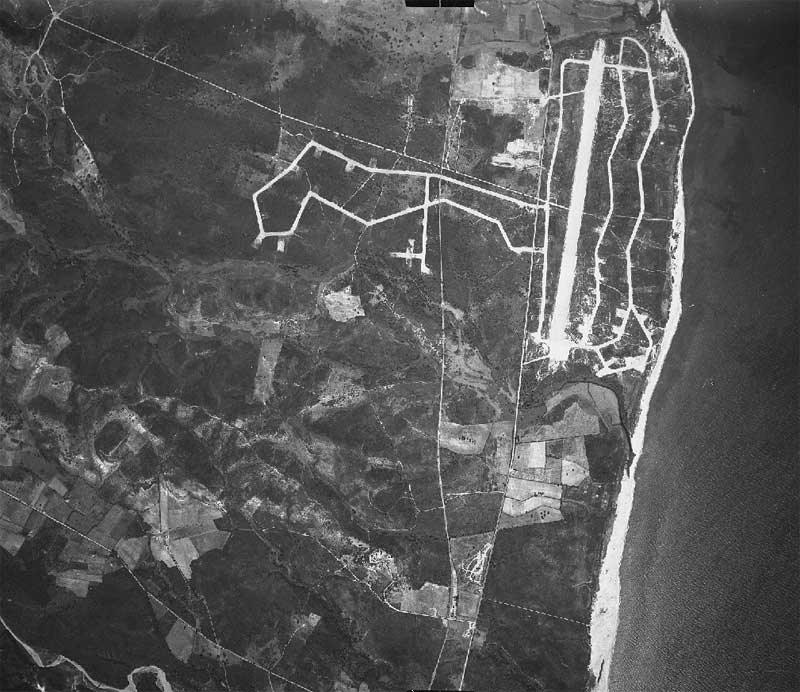
Alesani Airfield being dismantled in 1948

Alesani Airfield (also known as Advanced Landing Ground Alesanie or Alesan Airfield) was constructed by the Allies in early 1944. On 13 May 1944, 25 German Spitfires conducted an air raid, which severely damaged the 340th Bombardment Group's B-25s, which belonged to the 487 Bombardment Squadron. In 1948, Alesani Airfield was dismantled and abandoned afterwards.

Units:

- 340th Bombardment Group, mid-April 1944 to late-April 1945, 486th, 487th, 488th and 489th Bombardment Squadrons.

Infrastructure: The runway was built with pierced steel planking, warm-up aprons, a control tower, portable barracks, and billets.

=== Solenzara ===
Location: 41°55′23″N 9°24′12″E

Solenzara Airfield (also known as Air Base 126 Solenzara and Advanced Landing Ground Solenzara) was constructed by the USAAF's Twelfth Air Force XII Engineer Command during World War II. The runway was constructed with pierced steel planking.

Solenzara Airfield was designed for fighter, medium bomber units, as well as command and control. Known units assigned were:

- HQ, 57th Bombardment Wing, 20 April–5 October 1944
- 310th Bombardment Group, 10 December 1943 – 7 April 1945, B-25 Mitchell
- 324th Fighter Group, 19 July 1944 – 25 August 1944, P-40 Warhawk
- 321st Bombardment Group

Both the 310th and 324th flew combat missions in support of the invasion of Southern France (Operation Dragoon) during July and August 1944. After World War II and Operation Dragoon, the USAAF units moved out and returned to the United States. The airfield was transferred to France in July 1945.

The airfield is currently operated by NATO as Solenzara Air Base.

=== Calvi Sainte Catherine ===
Location: 42°31′39″N 8°47′34″E

In 1943, the airport was constructed as a military airfield by the Luftwaffe for strategic air operations. After the war in 1951, the airport was redeveloped for civil use and commercial flights.

Units:

- No. 43 (China-British) Squadron RAF
- No. 72 Squadron RAF
- No. 93 Squadron RAF
- No. 111 Squadron RAF
- No. 148 Squadron RAF
- No. 225 Squadron RAF
- No. 237 (Rhodesia) Squadron RAF
- No. 238 Squadron RAF
- No. 284 Squadron RAF
- No. 326 (GC II/7 'Nice') Squadron RAF
- No. 327 (GC I/3 'Corse') Squadron RAF
- No. 328 (GC I/7 'Provence') Squadron RAF
- No. 451 Squadron RAAF

Calvi-Sainte-Catherine Airport is operational as a civil airport today.

=== Calenzana ===
Units:

- No. 154 (Motor Industries) Squadron RAF
- No. 232 Squadron RAF
- No. 242 (Canadian) Squadron RAF
- No. 243 Squadron RAF

=== Migliacciaru ===
Migliacciaru Airfield was built in the 1940s by the 41st Engineers, and was occupied by the 57th Bomb Wing headquarters afterwards. ”Between 19 March 1944 and 11 May 1944 the 57th took part in Operation Strangle to destroy Italian marshalling yards, railroad repair facilities and other rail targets such as bridges, tunnels, and viaducts. It continued to fly close air support and interdiction missions in Italy throughout the war, and supported the invasion of southern France on 15 August 1944. After the war, unit and the airfield was inactivated.”

Units:

- HQ 57th Bomb Wing

== See also ==
- Foggia Airfield Complex
