= Mutualization infrastructure =

The mutualization infrastructure is the name given in France to a computer database, managed by the DGSE, containing the following metadata: identities of communicating people, their location, the duration and frequencies of the communications, the volume of each communication, and the subject of the message for emails. This database would cover "all" Internet communications and telephony in France, which would be collected outside any legality (according to the daily Le Monde in July 2013). One reason given would be the fight against terrorism. According to the services of the French Prime Minister, the device would be legal under the 1991 law, and there would be no massive and permanent espionage of French citizens because each interception of communication would be subject to authorization of CNCIS.

== Device ==
In the basement of the DGSE premises on Boulevard Mortier in Paris, supercomputers store the metadata intercepted (among other things) by listening stations spread over the French metropolitan and overseas territories. This automatic storage performed, precise interceptions can be made as needed. Thus, as recognized by Bernard Barbier, technical director of the DGSE in 2010, the DGSE collects millions of passwords: "The general public networks are the main target. [...] We store years of metadata: IP addresses, phone numbers, who calls who, at what hours ... And then we correlate. "

After several years of technical and human investments, the DGSE would have joined the first five nations in terms of computing capacity, behind the United States, the United Kingdom, Israel and China. According to its technical director, the heat generated by the supercomputers is enough to heat the building of DGSE.

The data collected is shared between the following intelligence services: the Internal Security Directorate (ISB), the National Directorate of Intelligence and Customs Investigations (DNRED), the Directorate of Defense Protection and Security ( DPSD), the Directorate of Military Intelligence (DRM), the Tracfin cell in Bercy, and the Intelligence Directorate of the Paris Police Prefecture. The judicial police can also appeal.

== Legality ==
The daily Le Monde, which revealed the existence of this device on July 4, 2013, speaks of its "illegality", pointing out that if the law strictly regulates security interceptions, nothing is provided in the law about massive storage of technical data by the secret services1. The services of the prime minister says the following day that "all of these interceptions are governed by the 1991 law", that they fall under a "decision of the Prime Minister after the opinion of the National Consultative Commission interceptions of security [CNCIS], who then has the power to control and verify them "and that there is" a trace-ability of all requests ".

The President of the Commission of the Laws of the National Assembly, Jean-Jacques Urvoas (PS) says that interceptions of communications "concerning French citizens" are subject to the authorization of CNCIS "on grounds clearly defined by law And that "French citizens are not subject to massive and permanent espionage outside of any control" .

Moreover, the volume of spy connections by the DGSE does not seem to be as important as the article du Monde reports, for technical and financial reasons .

== See also ==
- PRISM (monitoring program), similar American system.
- Intelligence of electromagnetic origin in France · Frenchelon
- Monitoring
