= 489th Attack Squadron =

489th Attack Squadron

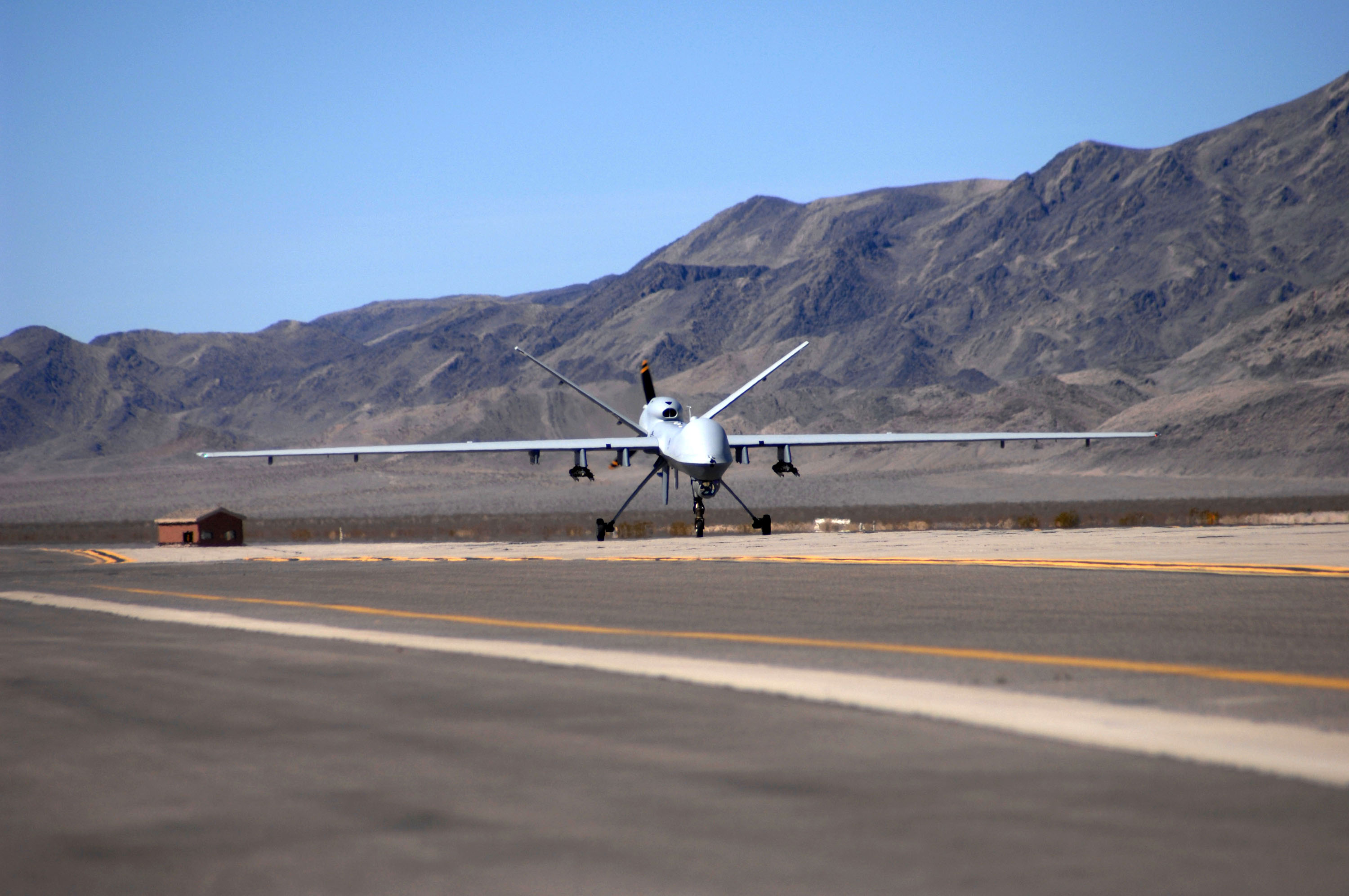
- MQ-9 Reaper at Creech AFB
- Active: 1917–1919; 1925–1942; 1942–1945; 1947–1949; 1958–1962; 2011-2015; 2016-present
- Country: United States
- Branch: United States Air Force
- Role: Unmanned aerial vehicle attack
- Part of: Air Combat Command
- Garrison/HQ: Creech Air Force Base
- Engagements: Mediterranean Theater of Operations
- Decorations: Distinguished Unit Citation; Air Force Meritorious Unit Award; Air Force Outstanding Unit Award

Insignia
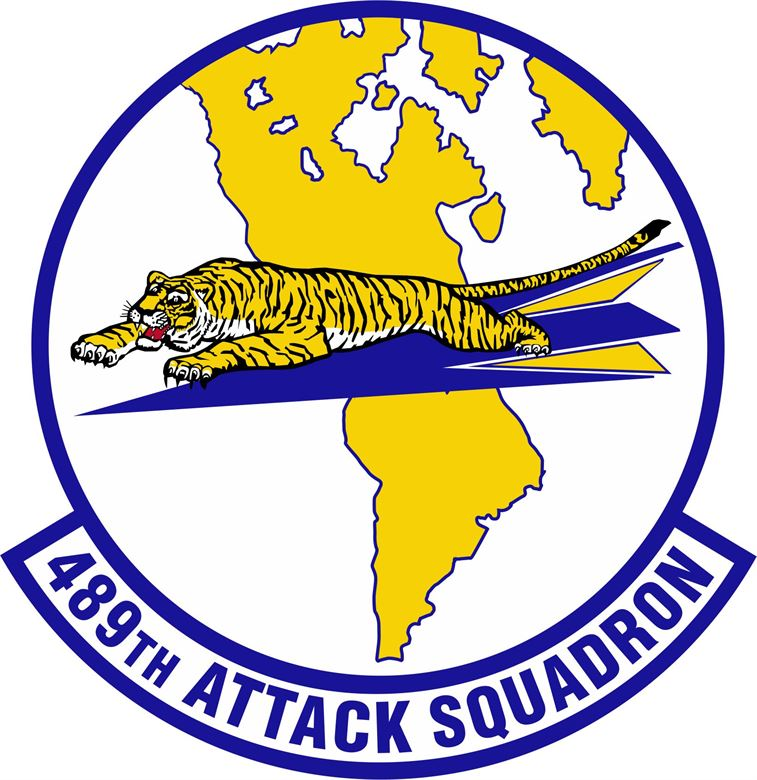
- 489th Attack Squadron emblem (Note: Approved 27 February 2017.)

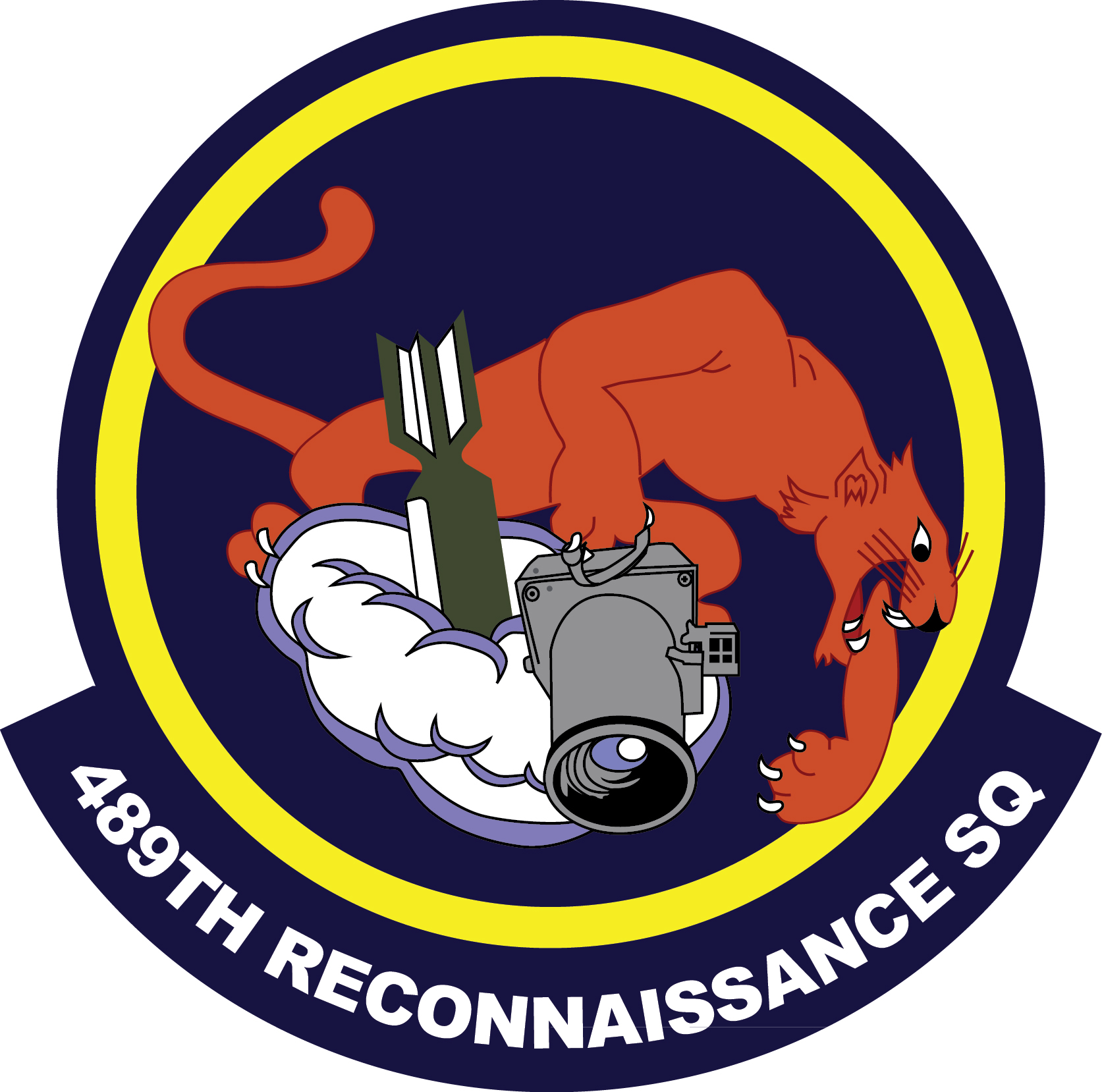
- 489th Reconnaissance Squadron emblem (Note: While active at Beale, the squadron used an updated version of its World War II emblem.)

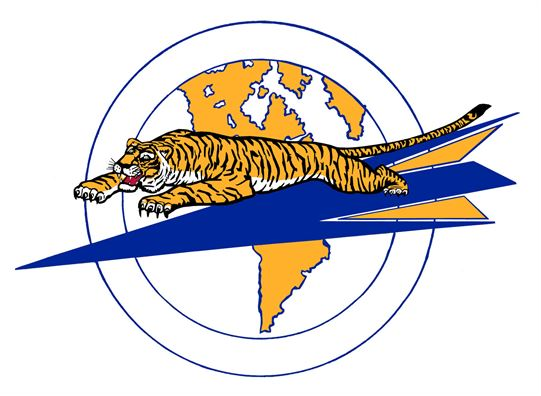
- 489th Bombardment Squadron emblem (Note: Approved 27 October 1959. Description: On a white globe bordered white, land areas representing the western hemisphere Air Force golden yellow; over all an Air Force blue dart-like weapon speeding to dexter its fins lined Air Force golden yellow; outlines and details Air Force golden yellow throughout; all surmounted fesswise by a springing tiger in profile, natural colors.)

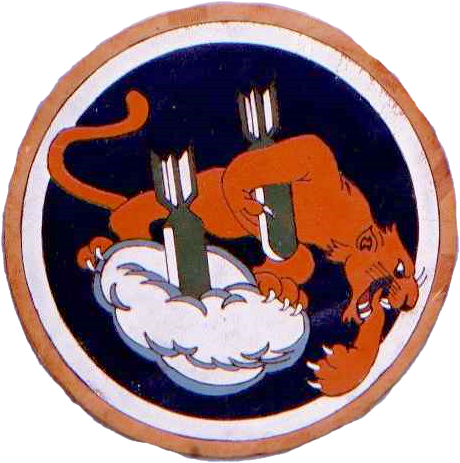
- 489th Bombardment Squadron emblem (World War II)

The 489th Attack Squadron is an active United States Air Force unit, stationed at Creech Air Force Base, Nevada, and operating General Atomics MQ-1 Predator and General Atomics MQ-9 Reaper unmanned aerial vehicles. It was active at Beale Air Force Base, California as the 489th Reconnaissance Squadron from 2011 to 2015.

The squadron was first activated as the 77th Aero Squadron in 1917. Redesignated as the 489th Aero Squadron, it served as a construction unit in France during World War I before returning to the US and being demobilized in 1919.

Through most of its existence, the squadron was named the 489th Bombardment Squadron. It served under this name from 1925 to 1942 in the Organized Reserve. The squadron served in the Mediterranean Theater of Operations during World War II, earning two Distinguished Unit Citations for actions in North Africa and Sicily. Inactivated after the war, it served briefly in the reserves a second time between 1947 and 1949. When Strategic Air Command reorganized its Boeing B-47 Stratojet wings as four squadron units the squadron was activated at Whiteman Air Force Base, Missouri, remaining active until 1962.

== Mission ==
The squadron flies launch and recovery remotely piloted aircraft operations for General Atomics MQ-1 Predators and General Atomics MQ-9 Reapers. After launching these aircraft, they are handed off to the aircrew who execute the assigned mission, before returning them to the squadron for recovery operations.

== History ==
=== World War I ===
The squadron was activated as the 77th Aero Squadron at Kelly Field, Texas in August 1917, and commanded by Capt. H. L. Mumma. In November 1917 the 77th moved to the Air Depot at Garden City, New York for deployment to the American Expeditionary Forces. On 4 December 1917, the squadron moved to the Philadelphia Port of Embarkation and boarded the transport SS Northland. On the Northland were 9 Aero Squadrons with 70 officers and 1,339 enlisted men. These 9 Squadrons were the 10th, 12th, 13th, 16th, 19th, 75th, 76th, 77th and 101st.

In January 1918 a new numbering scheme for aero squadrons was set up. The numbers 400 through 599 were reserved for Aero Squadrons (Construction). The 77th was redesignated as the 489th Aero Squadron (Construction). It served in France building facilities. The 489th returned to the States in February 1919 and went to Camp Stuart, Virginia. In March 1919 it was demobilized at Camp Lee, Virginia.

=== Organized Reserve ===
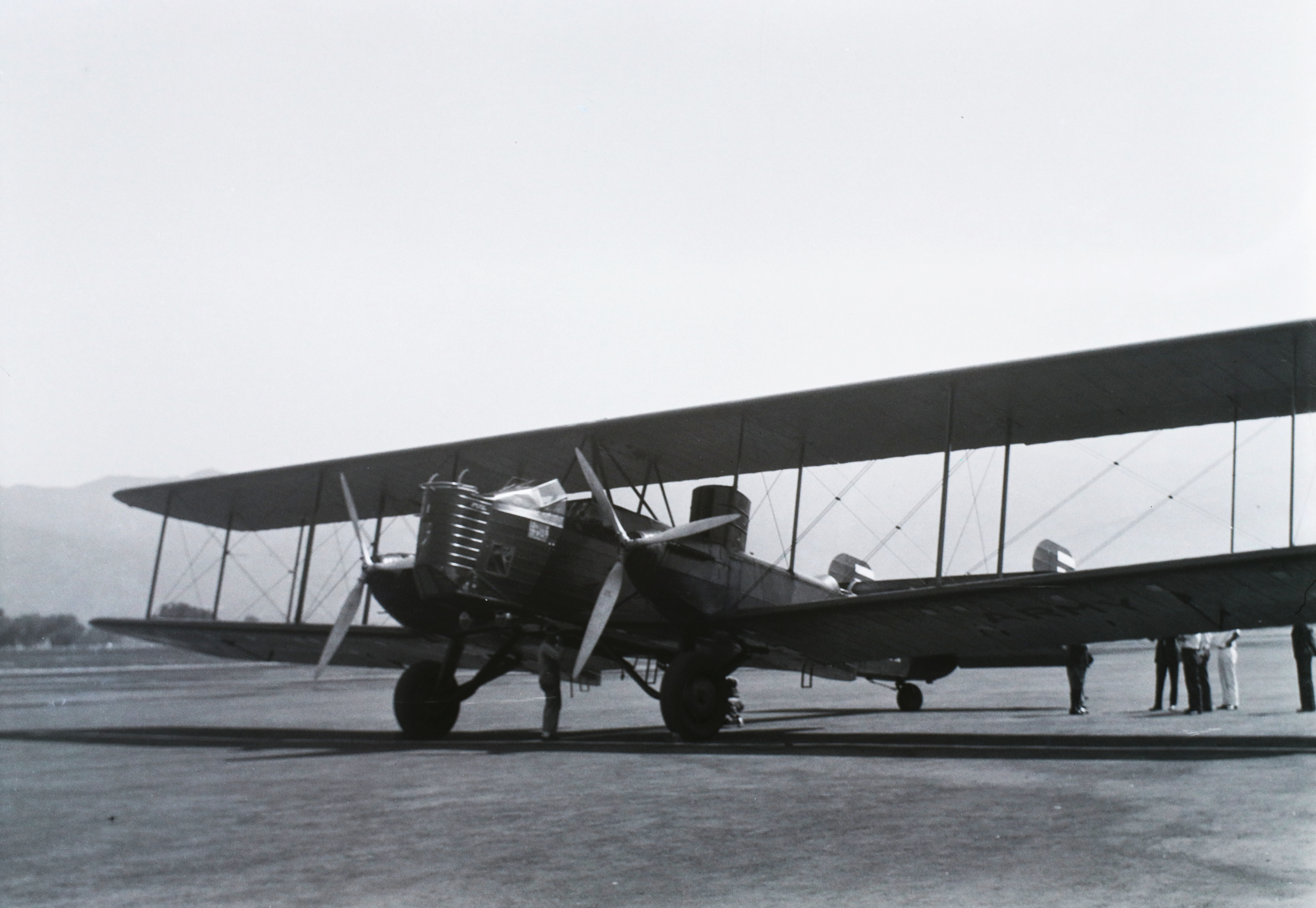
Curtiss B-2 Condor

The first 489th Bombardment Squadron was constituted in the Organized Reserve in March 1924 and allotted to the Ninth Corps Area. The squadron was manned in 1925 at Boeing Field, near Seattle, Washington. It was assigned to the 349th Bombardment Group from 22 October 1925 until c. June 1929 for mobilization as part of the General Headquarters Reserve. The 489th was one of the few Air Corps units in the Organized Reserve that possessed facilities, equipment and, aircraft between the wars, including Curtiss B-2 Condor bombers. In June 1932, the 489 Aero Squadron was reconstituted and consolidated with the 489 Bombardment Squadron. The unit typically conducted its inactive training at Pearson Field or in Seattle. It performed its summer training at various Air Corps installations in the Pacific coastal region. The squadron was disbanded, along with all other Organized Reserve Air Corps units on 31 May 1942 and its remaining personnel were called to active duty individually.

=== World War II ===
==== Initial organization and training ====
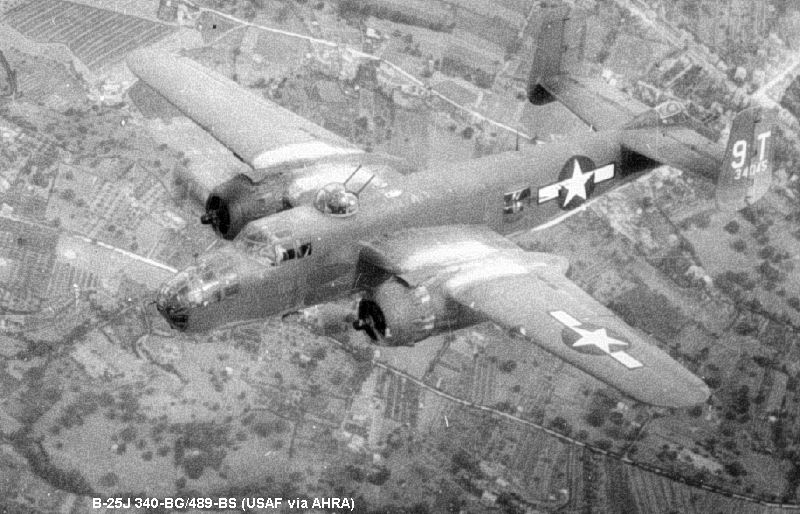
Squadron B-25 Mitchell

The second 489th Bombardment Squadron was activated at Columbia Army Air Base, South Carolina on 20 August 1942 as one of the four original squadrons of the 340th Bombardment Group. However, it was not until September that the squadron received its initial cadre, mostly drawn from the 309th Bombardment Group. It completed Phase I and Phase II training (Note: Phase I training concentrated on individual training in crewmember specialties. Phase II training emphasized the coordination for the crew to act as a team. The final phase concentrated on operation as a unit. Greer, p. 606.) at Columbia with North American B-25 Mitchells, then moved to Walterboro Army Air Field, South Carolina in November, where it completed Phase III training and departed for the Mediterranean Theater of Operations at the end of January 1943.

The squadron's ground echelon travelled by train to Camp Stoneman, California, where it boarded the USS West Point (AP-23) for the combat zone via the Pacific and Indian Oceans. The air echelon travelled by train to Kellogg Field, Michigan, where it received new B-25s to ferry across the Atlantic. It departed Morrison Field, Florida on 25 February 1943.

==== Combat operations ====
The squadron arrived at its first combat base, RAF Kabrit, Egypt in March 1943, with the air echelon arriving between 10 and 20 March and the ground echelon on 29 March. It began combat operations from Medenine Airfield, Tunisia in April, where the 340th Group flew its initial seven missions with the 12th Bombardment Group. Shortly thereafter, it moved to Sfax Airfield, Tunisia and began operations on its own. The 487th engaged primarily in air support and interdiction operations, targeting airfields, roads, bridges, road junctions, supply depots and marshalling yards. It participated in Operation Corkscrew, the reduction of defenses in Pantelleria and Lampedusa in June 1943. Although the squadron's operations were hindered by primitive living conditions at its base and unfavorable weather, the squadron supported the British Eighth Army in Tunisia and Allied forces in Operation Husky, the invasion of Sicily. For these actions, it was awarded a Distinguished Unit Citation (DUC).

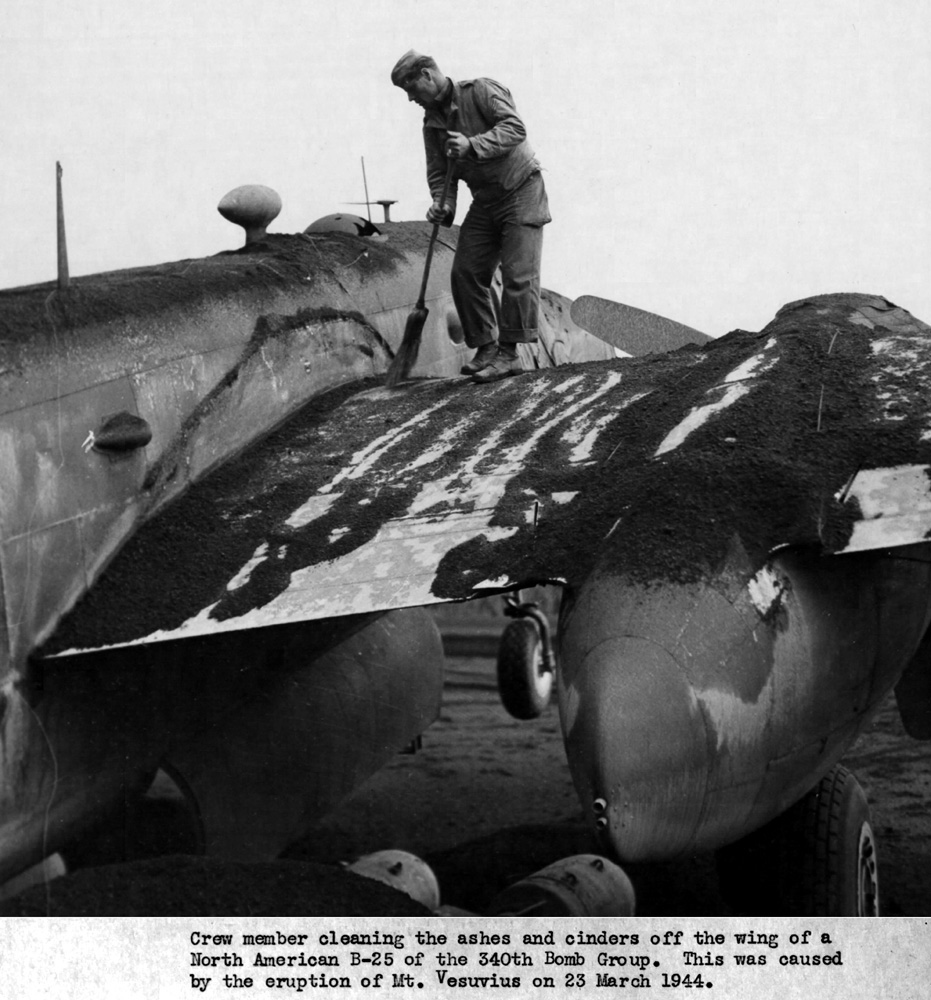
340th Group B-25 Mitchell covered with ash from Mount Vesuvius

As the Germans retreated from Sicily, the squadron attacked their evacuation beaches near Messina the following month. In September, it supported Operation Avalanche, the invasion of Italy near Salerno. During the first six months of 1944, it provided air support for the Allied drive on Rome. In March 1944, Mount Vesuvius erupted, covering 340th Group aircraft at Pompeii Airfield with volcanic ash. As a result, the squadron was forced to move to Gaudo Airfield. (Note: 88 of the 340th Group's Mitchells were destroyed at Pompeii by the eruption.) In April, it moved to Alesan Airfield, on Corsica.

The squadron sometimes bombed strategic targets as well. It operated against factories in Albania, Austria, Bulgaria, France, Greece, Italy, Tunisia and Yugoslavia. After September 1944, these targets included German lines of communication, particularly in the Alps, where it conducted raids on targets in the Brenner Pass. It also engaged in psychological warfare operations, dropping propaganda leaflets behind enemy lines. The squadron received a second DUC for action on 23 September 1944. The Italian Navy was attempting to block access to the heavily defended harbor of La Spezia by sinking a cruiser to block the entrance to the harbor. The squadron attacked and sank the cruiser before it could be maneuvered into position.

Just prior to V-E Day, the squadron returned to Italy, leaving for the United States in July 1945. The air echelon ferried its Mitchells, turning them in upon arrival in the United States, while the ground echelon returned by ship, leaving Naples on 28 July and arriving at Hampton Roads, Virginia on 7 August. It arrived at Seymour Johnson Field, North Carolina in August, although its personnel were granted leave and the squadron only began to reassemble in September. It returned to Columbia in October, but was inactivated in November.

=== Return to reserve status ===
The 489th was reactivated as a reserve unit under Air Defense Command (ADC) at Davis Field, Oklahoma on 10 November 1947. The 177th AAF Base Unit (later the 177th AF Base Unit, 2592d AF Reserve Training Center), located at Tinker Air Force Base, 140 miles to the west, oversaw its training. Through July 1948 the unit had only a single airplane assigned full time, and squadron strength was reduced by the end of the year as a dozen qualified pilots left the squadron and returned to active duty. (Note: Maurer lists no operational aircraft as assigned to the squadron from 1947 to 1949. Combat Squadrons, pp. 587-88.) In 1948 Continental Air Command assumed responsibility for managing air reserve and Air National Guard units from ADC. President Truman’s reduced 1949 defense budget required reductions in the number of units in the Air Force, and the 489th was inactivated in June 1949

=== Strategic Air Command ===
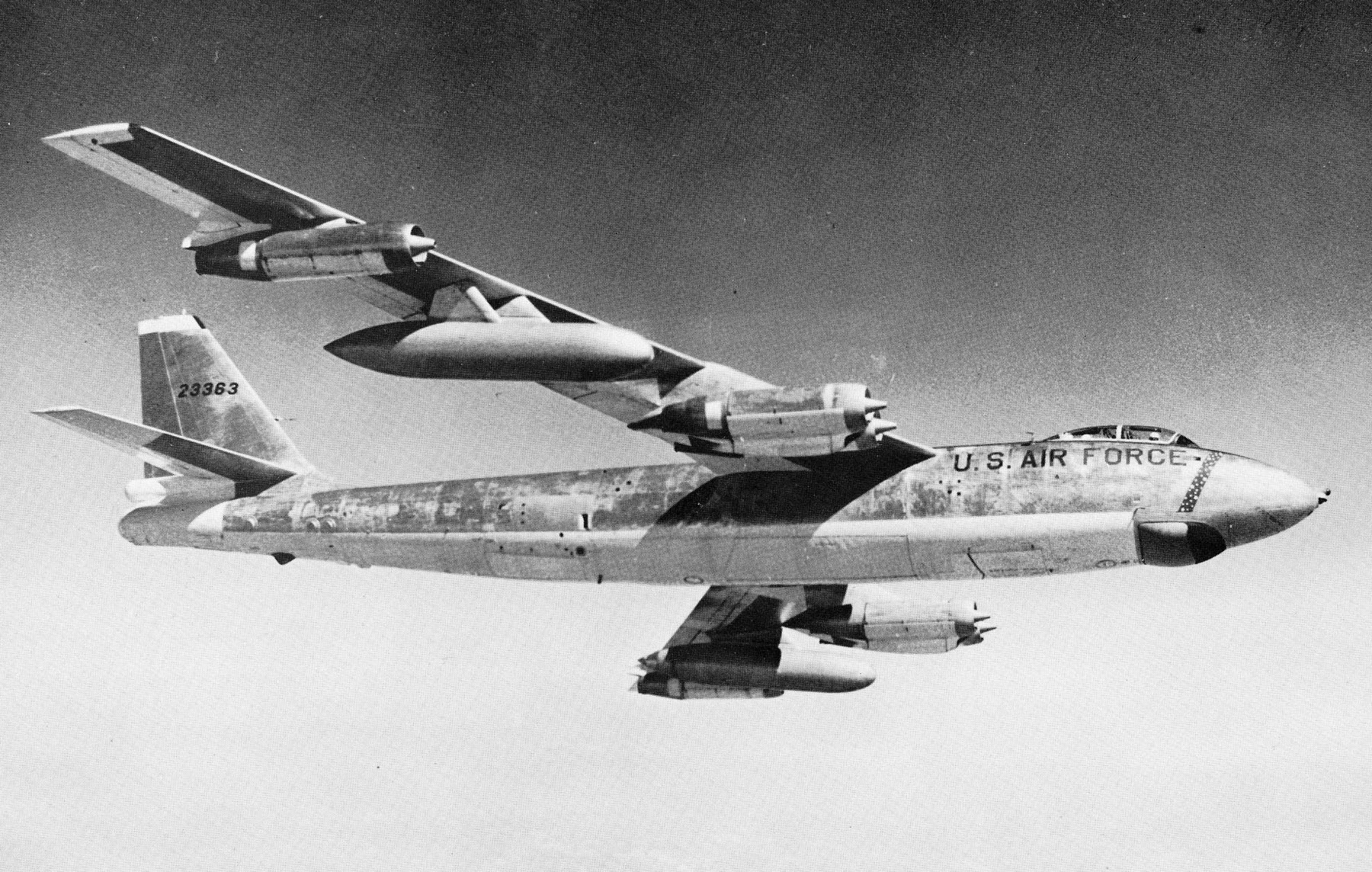
B47E Stratojet in flight

From 1958, the Boeing B-47 Stratojet wings of Strategic Air Command (SAC) began to assume an alert posture at their home bases, reducing the amount of time spent on alert at overseas bases. The SAC alert cycle divided itself into four parts: planning, flying, alert, and rest to meet General Thomas S. Power's initial goal of maintaining one-third of SAC's planes on fifteen-minute ground alert, fully fueled and ready for combat to reduce vulnerability to a Soviet missile strike. To implement this new system B-47 wings reorganized from three to four squadrons. The two 489th Squadrons were consolidated as a single unit, which was activated at Whiteman Air Force Base as the fourth squadron of the 340th Bombardment Wing. The alert commitment was increased to half the squadron's aircraft in 1962 and the four squadron pattern no longer met the alert cycle commitment, so the squadron was inactivated on 1 January 1962.

=== Reconnaissance operations ===
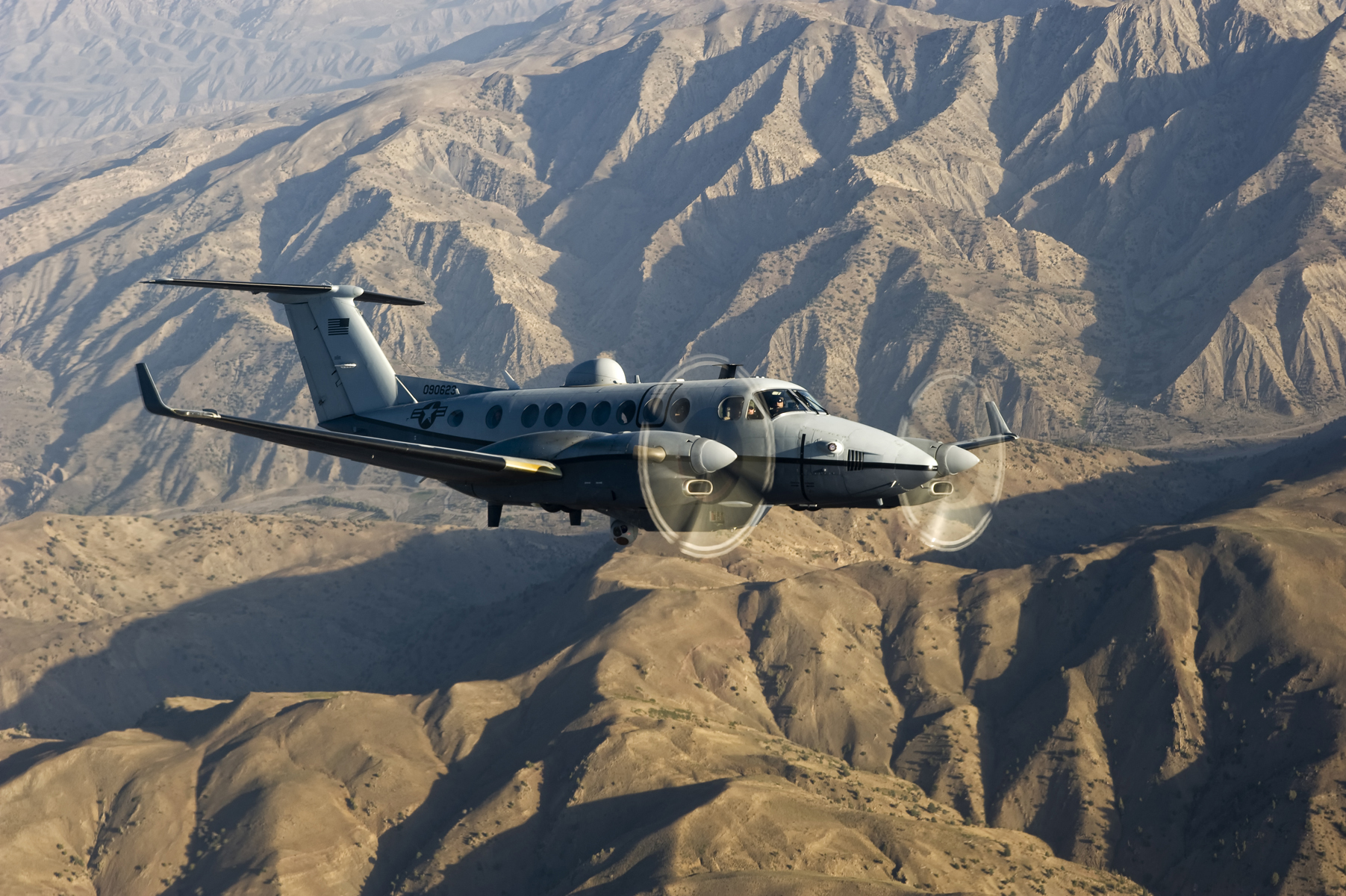
MC-12 in flight

The squadron was activated as the 489th Reconnaissance Squadron on 26 August 2011 at Beale Air Force Base near Marysville, California as a component of the 9th Operations Group, flying Beechcraft MC-12W Liberty aircraft. It was inactivated on 10 May 2015. The squadron used Beale as the home base for the MC-12W, while it deployed crews trained to pursue elusive high-value targets such as insurgent kingpins in the Middle East. In 2015, all aircraft were transferred to United States Southern Command, the Army, and other US government agencies.

=== 489th Attack Squadron ===
The squadron was redesignated as the 489th Attack Squadron at Creech Air Force Base under the 432d Operations Group, on 2 December 2016. It operates General Atomics MQ-1 Predator and General Atomics MQ-9 Reaper unmanned aerial vehicles. Members of the unit deploy to meet mission needs, while other members stay at Creech to meet home station requirements such as training, professional development and personal readiness. The squadron was the first in the Air Force to use the MQ-9's automated takeoff and landing capability.

== Lineage ==
489th Aero Squadron

- Organized as the 77th Aero Squadron on 13 August 1917 (Note: This squadron is not related to the 77th Aero Squadron established on 20 February 1918. Maurer, Combat Squadrons, pp. 277-278.)

Redesignated 489th Aero Squadron (Construction) on 1 February 1918
Demobilized on 6 March 1919
Reconstituted and consolidated with the 489th Bombardment Squadron in June 1932

489th Bombardment Squadron
Constituted as the 489th Bombardment Squadron on 31 March 1924 and allotted to the reserve
Activated, date unknown (personnel assigned in January 1925)
Consolidated with the 489th Aero Squadron in June 1932
Disbanded on 31 May 1942
Consolidated with the 489th Bombardment Squadron, Medium on 11 August 1958

489th Attack Squadron

- Constituted as the 489th Bombardment Squadron (Medium) on 10 August 1942

Activated on 20 August 1942
Redesignated 489th Bombardment Squadron, Medium c. 20 August 1943
Inactivated on 7 November 1945
Redesignated 489th Bombardment Squadron, Light on 24 October 1947
Activated in the reserve on 10 November 1947
Inactivated on 27 June 1949
Redesignated 489th Bombardment Squadron, Medium on 11 August 1958 and consolidated with the 489th Bombardment Squadron
Activated on 1 October 1958
Discontinued and inactivated on 1 January 1962
Redesignated 489th Reconnaissance Squadron on 14 June 2011
Activated on 26 August 2011
Inactivated on 10 May 2015

- Redesignated 489th Attack Squadron on 1 December 2016

Activated on 2 December 2016

=== Assignments ===
- Unknown, 13 August 1917 – February 1918 (Note: Probably Station Headquarters, Kelly Field and Station Headquarters, Hazelhurst Field while stationed there.)
- Air Service Production Center No. 2, February–December 1918
- Unknown, December 1918 – 6 March 1919
- Ninth Corps Area, 1925 – 31 May 1942 (349th Bombardment Group for mobilization until c. June 1929)
- 340th Bombardment Group, 20 August 1942 – 7 November 1945
- 340th Bombardment Group, 10 November 1947 – 27 June 1949
- 340th Bombardment Wing, 1 October 1958 – 1 January 1962
- 9th Operations Group, 26 August 2011 – 10 May 2015
- 432nd Operations Group, 2 December 2016 – present

=== Stations ===
- Kelly Field, Texas, 13 August 1917
- Garden City, New York, 5 November–4 December 1917
- St. Maixent, France, 1 January 1918
- Romorantin, France, 13 February 1918
- Brest, France, c. 4 January 1919-unknown
- Camp Stuart, Virginia, c. 8 February 1919
- Camp Lee, Virginia, February-6 March 1919
- Boeing Field, Washington, c. 1924-31 May 1942.
- Columbia Army Air Base, South Carolina, 20 August 1942
- Walterboro Army Air Field, South Carolina 30 November 1942 – 30 January 1943
- RAF Kabrit, Egypt 29 March 1943
- Medenine Airfield, Tunisia 13 April 1943
- Sfax Airfield, Tunisia 26 April 1943
- Hergla Airfield, Tunisia 3 June 1943
- Comiso Airfield, Sicily, Italy, 2 August 1943
- Catania Airport, Sicily, Italy, 27 August 1943
- San Pancrazio Airfield, Italy, 15 October 1943
- Salsola Airfield (Foggia Satellite III), Italy 25 November 1943
- Pompeii Airfield, Italy 5 January 1944
- Gaudo Airfield, Italy 24 March 1944
- Alesan Airfield, Corsica, France 19 April 1944
- Rimini Airfield, Italy 4 April-16 July 1945
- Seymour Johnson Field, North Carolina, 9 August 1945
- Columbia Army Air Base, South Carolina 2 October – 7 November 1945
- Davis Field, Oklahoma, 10 November 1947 – 27 June 1949
- Whiteman Air Force Base, Missouri, 1 October 1958 – 1 January 1962
- Beale Air Force Base, California, 26 August 2011 - 10 May 2015
- Creech Air Force Base, Nevada, 2 December 2016 – present

=== Aircraft ===
- Curtiss B-2 Condor, 1930–1934 (Note: Other squadron aircraft before 1942 have not been identified.)
- North American B-25 Mitchell, 1942–1945
- Boeing B-47 Stratojet, 1958–1962
- Beechcraft MC-12W Liberty, 2011–2015
- General Atomics MQ-1 Predator, 2016–present
- General Atomics MQ-9 Reaper, 2016–present

=== Awards and campaigns ===
Award streamer	Award	Dates	Notes
	Distinguished Unit Citation	c. 11 April 1943–17 August 1943	489th Bombardment Squadron, North Africa and Sicily
	Distinguished Unit Citation	23 September 1944	489th Bombardment Squadron, Italy
	Air Force Meritorious Unit Award	1 June 2013=31 May 2014	489th Reconnaissance Squadron
	Air Force Meritorious Unit Award	1 June 2017=31 May 2018	489th Attack Squadron
	Air Force Meritorious Unit Award	1 June 2018-31 May 2020	489th Attack Squadron
	Air Force Outstanding Unit Award	1 June 2011=31 May 2012	489th Reconnaissance Squadron
	Air Force Outstanding Unit Award	1 June 2014=31 May 2015	489th Reconnaissance Squadron

Campaign Streamer	Campaign	Dates	Notes
	Theater of Operations (France)	1 January 1918–c. 4 January 1919	489th Aero Squadron
	Tunisia	c. 12 April 1943 – 13 May 1943	489th Bombardment Squadron
	Sicily	14 May 1943 – 17 August 1943	489th Bombardment Squadron
	Naples-Foggia	18 August 1943 – 21 January 1944	489th Bombardment Squadron
	Anzio	22 January 1944 – 24 May 1944	489th Bombardment Squadron
	Rome-Arno	22 January 1944 – 9 September 1944	489th Bombardment Squadron
	Southern France	15 August 1944 – 14 September 1944	489th Bombardment Squadron
	North Apennines	10 September 1944 – 4 April 1945	489th Bombardment Squadron
	Po Valley	3 April 1945 – 8 May 1945	489th Bombardment Squadron
	Air Combat, EAME Theater	c. 12 April 1943 – 11 May 1945	489th Bombardment Squadron
