= Directorate of Intelligence =

Directorate of Intelligence may refer to:

- CIA Directorate of Intelligence, former name for the CIA's Directorate of Analysis
- Directorate of Intelligence (United Kingdom)
- Directorate of Military Intelligence (Ireland)
- FBI Directorate of Intelligence, a unit of the FBI's Intelligence Branch

== See also ==
- Direction Nationale du Renseignement et des Enquêtes Douanières, France
