= French Liberation Army =

Reunified French Armed Forces during WWII

- Armée française de la Libération
- Active: 8 January 1943–1945
- Country: Free France; Second French Colonial Empire
- Type: Army
- Size: 550,000 (1944); 1,300,000 (1945)
- Engagements: Italian campaign Liberation of Corsica; Battle of Marseille; Operation Overlord; Liberation of Paris; Operation Dragoon; Campaign of France; Colmar Pocket; French West Africa

Commanders
- Notable commanders: Henri Giraud; Charles de Gaulle

Insignia
- Identification symbol

The French Liberation Army (French: Armée française de la Libération [aʁme fʁɑ̃sɛːz də la libeʁɑsjɔ̃]; AFL) was the reunified French Army that arose from the merger of the Giraudist Armée d'Afrique with the prior Gaullist Free French Forces (Forces françaises libres; FFL) during World War II. The military force of Free France, it participated in the Italian and Tunisian campaigns before joining in the 1944 Liberation of France with other Western Allies of World War II. It went on to join the Western Allied invasion of Germany to secure the capitulation of Germany's remaining forces. The successor to the FLA, the modern French Armed Forces would jointly occupy Germany with the other allies until 1955.

== History ==
The French Liberation Army was created in January 1943 when the Army of Africa (Armée d'Afrique) led by General Giraud was combined with the Free French Forces of General de Gaulle.

The AFL participated in the campaigns of Tunisia and Italy; during the Italian campaign the AFL was known as the French Expeditionary Corps in Italy (Corps Expéditionnaire Français en Italie or CEFI) making a quarter of the troops deployed. The AFL was key in the liberation of Corsica, the first French metropolitan department to be liberated. The troops that landed 2 months after D-Day were the 2nd Armored Division under Philippe Leclerc and the 1st Battalion Marine Commando Fusiliers (1er Bataillon de Fusiliers Marins Commandos) better known as Commando Kieffer.

During the Allied invasion of Provence, on 15 August 1944, the AFL made the majority of the troops landing on French shores, capturing the ports of Toulon and Marseille. The French troops in Southern France were now named French First Army and would participate in the Liberation of France and the invasion of south-western Germany in 1944–45. One of the AFL's garrison and second-line formations, which later helped man the French occupation zone in Germany, was the 10th Infantry Division.

== Division of the French Armed Forces ==
The appeal by Philippe Pétain, marshal of France, nicknamed the "Hero of Verdun" to "cease fighting" that was broadcast on the 17th of June, 1940 on French national radio and the response by Charles de Gaulle to keep up the resistance on the British radio network the BBC the next day divided the remnants of the French Army that had just been defeated.

On the one hand, the large majority of this force, the Armistice Army, was loyalist and obeyed the government installed in Vichy in the Zone libre (Not occupied by the German Wehrmacht, but effectively submissive to the German government). On the other, a minority force which considered Vichy "rebels" and as such considered them condemned to death, was the Free French Forces. The FFL recognised the authority of Charles de Gaulle, a colonel who had been named brigadier general on a temporary basis on the field of battle, then as under secretary of state at war and who defended the idea of Georges Mandel to continue to fight with a government based in French North Africa and to mobilise the French Colonial Empire, which, at the time, was the second largest in the world after the British colonial empire.

Having departed for London General de Gaulle was proclaimed head of Free France and recognised as such by the British, decided to continue the war with allied Britain. Formerly, the allied Britain had evacuated most of de Gaulle's Metropolitan French troops from Dunkirk On the 29th of August 1940, French Equatorial Africa, through the intervention of governor-general Félix Éboué, recognised the authority of general de Gaulle and joined, in the Free French Camp with the New Hebrides, French India, and the French domains of Saint Helena

Two French armies went on to lead their combatants from opposing camps (that is the Axis or the Allies) and they would go on to meet head-to-head several times on the battlefield, notably in Dakar and Syria.

The first French-on-French confrontation was the Battle of Dakar, capital of French West Africa, in September 1940, where an Anglo-French fleet under British command (while being the only FFL military operation in which de Gaulle physically participated) sent by parliamentarians of Free France to convince the governor-general of French West Africa, Pierre Boisson, to rally to the Free French cause. He did not recognise the authority of general de Gaulle and expressed his refusal by peppering the visiting delegation with bullets. An attempted landing by Free French forces was similarly repulsed and did not participate in the naval artillery duel that followed. Vichy remained in control of French West Africa and it was an agonising defeat for Free France.

The refusal by Boisson took place following orders by admiral François Darlan, Minister of Marine, to fire on any approaching British vessel. This order was a response to the British Operation Catapult that, from the 2nd to 8 July 1940, effected the destruction of the Vichy naval forces during the Attack on Mers-el-Kebir — where 1,200 French sailors were killed by their erstwhile allies — the capture manu militari of those naval forces which had retreated to Plymouth and Gibraltar, the disarmament of those based in Alexandria, and the attack on the French battleship Richelieu — the largest of its era — by the British aircraft carrier HMS Hermes that left Richelieu stranded (The Richelieu had earlier been escorting the British HMS Panther).

The Battle of Gabon in November 1940 precipitated the "Dakar Affair" and, this time, the Free French forces obtained by force the unity of this territory, then intervening in 1941 in the Syria-Lebanon Campaign, where, after a month of fighting, the Australians, Indians, Brits, and the Free French inflicted thousands of deaths on general Henri Dentz's Army of the Levant, Dentz finally surrendered to the British.

On the eve of the Anglo-American invasion of North Africa in November 1942, the schism between the allies and FFL was profound because de Gaulle was kept at a distance from the operation by Roosevelt and Churchill following the failure of de Gaulle to reach Dakar in 1940. In fact, his participation in Operation Torch was limited to the "appeal to the French of North Africa" on the broadcast Honneur et Patrie, distributed on radio by the BBC on November 8, 1942; he didn't arrive in Algiers until June 1943. In response to the allied invasion, the Vichyist Légion impériale was created in November, 1942 in Tunisia, while the French fleet was being scuttled at Toulon. Then, in 1943, French West Africa and the Alexandrian fleet of admiral René-Émile Godfroy rallied to Giraud.

== Reunification ==
In the autumn of 1942, after the Battle of Bir Hakeim, in which the 1st Free French brigade under the command of Marie-Pierre Kœnig slowed the German advance, the FFL was in Libya and fought Erwin Rommel's troops alongside the British army. Two Free French brigades, the 1st division, participated in the Second Battle of El Alamein, and colonel Leclerc conquered Fezzan.

On the 8th of November, 1942, the Army of Africa, under orders from the Vichy regime, briefly confronted the invading allies (Operation Torch), but combat quickly came to a halt and an accord was reached. In revenge, in Tunisia, this same army allowed Axis forces entry without resistance and retreated.

The Army of Africa progressively resumed combat against the allied flanks and lead them into a difficult Tunisian campaign, with oftentimes miserable arms (issued by the French Army in 1940, since outdated). It was there that Leclerc's forces stumbled upon Edgard de Larminat's 1st Division.

However, once victory was achieved, dissent grew. In Algiers, the fight for power between de Gaulle and Giraud had turned to whether or not to continue all the way to Vichy. The Free French, aware of their numerical disadvantage, did everything possible to rally others to their cause, and the heads of the Army of Africa were experiencing desertions across their ranks. Finally, Giraud was granted an American command to organise the movements of two Free French divisions in Tripolitania.

However, the support of organisations affiliated with the French Resistance (later formalised as the French Forces of the Interior (FFI)) and the return of Giraudist commissioners of the French Committee of National Liberation, like Jean Monnet, permitted de Gaulle to supersede Giraud, and an accord was met that resulted in the fusion of the Free French Forces on August 1, 1943.

While on this date the FFL officially ceased to exist, the expression "Free French Forces" was and is still often used, albeit incorrectly, to refer to the French Liberation Army. This confusion was not reflected in documents of the era produced by those themselves who had interest in eliminating such confusion, on the contrary, the new command tried desperately to remove the words "Free France" from the names of units with such names. The 1st Free French Division was officially renamed the "1st Motorized Infantry Division" without really accepting it, and the 2nd Free French Division became the 2nd Armored Division, which had doubled in number due to reorganisation of the Free French and defection of elements of the Army of Africa.

The expression "Combatant French Forces" (FFC) is also used to refer to the Free French Forces post-reunification, always incorrectly. In effect, after July 13, 1942, the official name of Free France became "Fighting France", even so and despite the facts, the old designation lived on, and the Fighting French Forces gathered the Free French and networks of the Interior resistance, whether they were made by the BCRA (and approved by the Free French Forces) or not (approved by the Combatant French Forces).

== Makeup ==
=== Ground Army ===
==== Anfa Plan ====
The Anfa Conference, in January 1943, planned for the formation of eight infantry divisions and three armoured divisions, rearmed by the Americans. The eleven divisions from the dissolved Army of Africa were the following:

- 2nd Moroccan Infantry Division
- 3rd Algerian Infantry Division
- 4th Moroccan Mountain Division (ex-3rd Moroccan Motorized Division)
- 6th Moroccan Infantry Division
- 7th Algerian Infantry Division (ex-1st Algerian Infantry Division)
- 8th Algerian Infantry Division (ex-2nd Algerian Infantry Division)
- 9th Colonial Infantry Division
- 10th Colonial Infantry Division (ex-2nd Colonial Infantry Division)
- 1st Armored Division
- 2nd Armored Division (Renamed the 5th Armored Division)
- 3rd Armored Division (1943–46)

But the two divisions of the Free French Forces (the 1st Free French Division and the 2nd Free French Division) were given no consideration by the plan. After the fusion of the Free French Forces and the Army of Africa on August 1, 1943, they were included in an updated version of the plan

- Military history of France during World War II replacing some divisions of the Army of Africa. The 2nd armoured division became the fifth armoured division and the 2nd Free French Division became the 2nd Armored Division. The 1st Free French division became the 1st ground infantry division.

The material needs of each division were evaluated and in the end only eight divisions could be formed. The 6th, 7th, 8th, 10th, and 3rd Armored Division were dissolved between September 1943 and 1944. Some, like the 6th Moroccan Infantry division were simple auxiliary units, and others were only partially formed and maintained "without plan"

Other territorial defence units and guard units in North Africa were maintained "without plan". finally, the four groups of Moroccan Gumiers were not included in the Anfa plan, but were nevertheless participants in the Italian Campaign and Operation Husky.

==== Units established in France ====
After the Liberation of France, the elements of the French Forces of the Interior were mobilised to continue the fight. A party of interior forces replaced the divisions of the Anfa Plan, who were "whitened (Note: The term for the forced repatriation of colonial troops after the allied invasion of southern France [Renoult 2025])" at the same time. Amongst others, these new divisions formed: .*The 1st division of the Far East

- The 2nd division of the Far East
- The 1st Infantry Division
- The 10th Infantry Division
- The 14th infantry division
- The 19th infantry division
- The 23rd infantry division
- The 25th infantry division
- The 27th Alpine Division
- The 36th Infantry Division (France)
- The 3rd Armored Division

The 1st and 14th infantry divisions joined the 1st French Army during the last months of the Allied invasion of Germany. The 10th, 19th, 23rd, and 25th infantry divisions were deployed against various Atlantic pockets, with the 3rd Armored in formation towards the south-east. The 36th reified the south-east towards the 27th alpine division, positioned in the alps. The two divisions of the Far-East were destined to depart to reinforce French Indochina against Japan.

Finally, numerous "light" regiments were formed, often armed by the Americans and shared with guarding communication lines and the rears of allied armies.

=== Aviation ===
In November 1942, excluding the French Free Air Force (FFAF) equipped by and integrated with essential components of the Royal Air Force, the materiel available in French North Africa was expired and many of the techniques and concepts of aerial warfare were foreign to French pilots, who had been well isolated from the ongoing warfare [in Europe] for more than two years.

From January to June 1943, the American reinforcements had slowed. Many variables explained the want: primarily the training of American pilots, priority was given to materiel destined for American forces in Great Britain, which sowed some sort of doubt in the French pilots.

The FFAF consisted of:

- Groupe de chasse Alsace, equipped with Hawker Hurricanes in 1942
- Groupe de Chasse "Île-de-France operating the Supermarine Spitfire in 1942
- The Régiment de Chasse 2/30 Normandie-Niemen with the Yak-3
- The Groupe de Bombardement nº 1/20 "Lorraine"
- Bomber group "Brittany", composed of Martin 167, Bristol Blenheim, and Westland Lysander bombers
- The Escadron de Chasse 2/4 La Fayette, reequipped with Curtiss P-40 Warhawk Fighter-bombers in 1943
- No. 326 (GC/II/7 "Nice") No. 326 Squadron outfitted with Spitfires
- Escadron de Chasse 3/11 Corse in Spitfires
- No. 328 Squadron RAF in Spitfires
- No. 329 Squadron RAF in Spitfires
- No. 345 Squadron RAF in Spitfires
- No. 346 Squadron RAF in Spitfires
- GB I/25 "Tunisia"
- Groupe de Chasse I
- Groupe de Chasse II
- Groupe de Chasse III
- Groupe de Chasse IV
- Reconnaissance Group II/33 "Savoie" in Hawkers and P-38 Lightnings outfitted for reconnaissance
- Night Chase Units 1 and 5
- Madagascar aerial group
- Bomber group
- Aerial observation group
- Naval aviation
- The 2nd and 3rd Parachute Chasseur Regiment

== Campaigns ==
=== Forces involved ===
- Liberation armies
  - In Tunisia (November 1942 - May 1943): as of March 15, 1943, the total engaged in battle was 72,802 men, of which 50,651 were Maghrebi
  - In Italy (November 1943 - July 1944): as of June 15, 1944, the total engaged in battle was 104,584 men, of which 59,665 were Maghrebi
  - In France and Germany (August 1944 - May 1945): As of August 1944, the total engaged in battle was 267,654 of which 130,000 were Maghrebi (including the Senegalese Tirailleurs, who had not yet been repatriated)
  - By the end of 1944, the French Liberation Army numbered more than 600,000 men, of which two cohorts came from French North Africa. This included 176,000 "Europeans" and 233,000 "Muslims", following the naming conventions of the time.
- FFI: 100,000 by June 1944; 200,000 by July; and 340,000 to 400,000 by October 1944.
- Air Force: 140,000
- Marines: 50,000 to 68,000
- Gendarmerie: 50,000

=== France ===
The liberation of Metropolitan France began not in 1944 with Operation Dragoon, but in 1943 with the liberation of Corsica. Profiting from the Italian capitulation, French forces landed on the island and aided the Corsican resistance (FFI and FTP), with the help of some Italian troops, to liberate this metropolitan department.

The first French troops to participate in the battle of Normandy were the Kieffer Commandos, who on June 6, 1944, fought alongside the British. The first French forces of significance, the 2nd armoured division of General Leclerc landed on August 1 alongside American forces. They participated in the end of Operation Overlord and took an active part in the Liberation of Paris.

Nevertheless, the French armed forces went on to have a more active role in the liberation of continental France after the landings in Provence, August 15, 1944. Under pressure from De Gaulle who threatened to withdraw their troops from Italy, British Prime Minister Winston Churchill was compelled to accept a [continental] landing in the South of France and not a landing in the Balkans as he had initially hoped for. All in all, there were 350,000 French and Americans who would take part in combat, of which 250,000 (71%) were French.

The rapid and unexpected progress inwards was so much so that it contrasted with the inward stall in Normandy in the months prior. Incidentally, one of the reasons they would push Paris towards insurrection from August 19. In practice, as the allied troops would progress from the Northwest and Southeast, Parisian resistance would surge.
