= Haize Hegoa type patrol boat =

Series of French boats

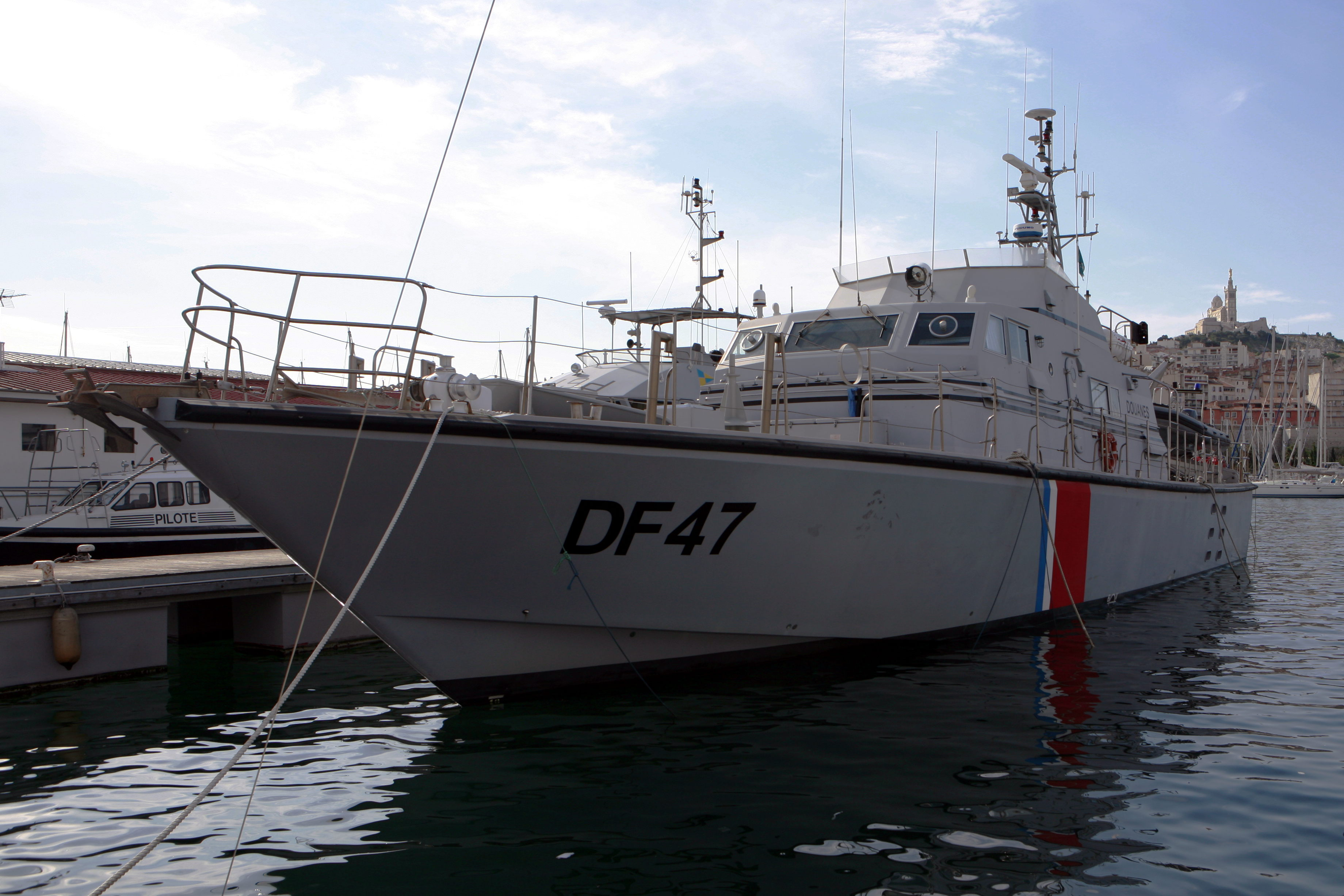
- Patrol boat Lissero in the old harbour of Marseille.

Class overview
- Operators: France (Customs service)
- Completed: 8

General characteristics
- Class & type: PLASCOA 2100 swift boat
- Displacement: 35 t (34 long tons)
- Length: 28.7 m (94 ft 2 in)
- Beam: 5.55 m (18 ft 3 in)
- Draught: 1.5 m (4 ft 11 in)
- Installed power: 1,100 shp (820 kW)
- Speed: 28 knots (52 km/h; 32 mph)
- Range: 500 nmi (930 km; 580 mi)
- Endurance: 4 days
- Boats & landing craft carried: One rigid-hull boat
- Sensors & processing systems: Radar

The Haize Hegoa type patrol boats are a series of eight swift boats used by the Directorate-general of customs and indirect taxes, the French customs service. Haize Hegoa means southern wind in the Basque language.

== Ships in class ==
- Alizé (DF31)
- Haize Hegoa (DF43)
- Kan Avel (DF36)
- Mervent (DF44)
- Lissero (DF47)
- Vent d'aval (DF37)
- Vent d'autan (DF45)
- Avel Sterenn (DF46)
