= Musée national des douanes =

Coordinates: 44.8410°N 0.5698°W

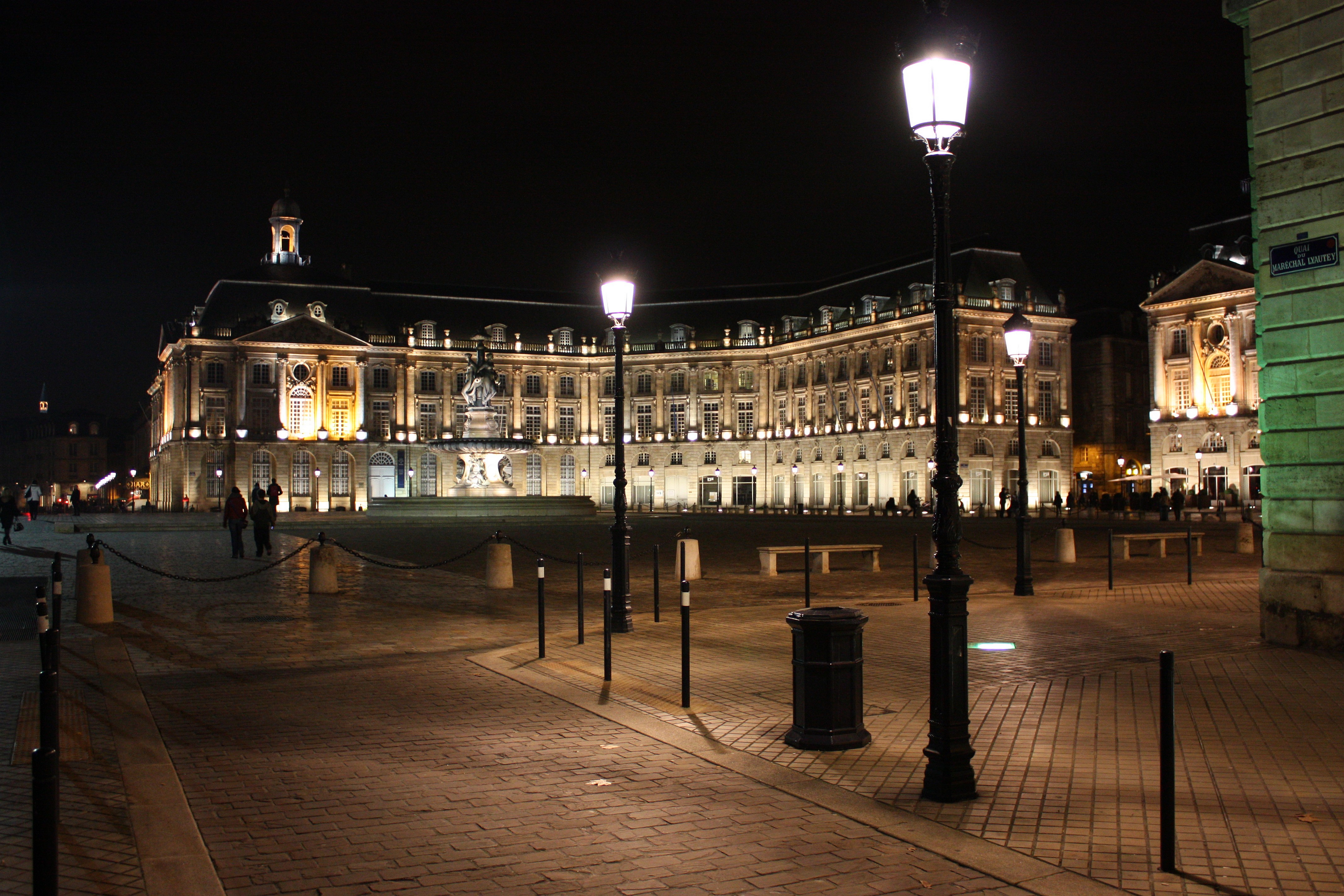
View of the place de la Bourse with the building of the Musée national des douanes.

The Musée national des douanes is a national museum on the history of French customs located at Place de la Bourse in the city of Bordeaux, France. The building was built in the 18th century to receive the new Ferme générale. The museum was inaugurated in 1984, within the grounds of the Hôtel des Douanes in Bordeaux. It presents the history of the Customs administration — one of the oldest in France — from the late 18th century to the present day, and through it part of the History of France.
