= Directorate-General of Customs and Indirect Taxes =

French ministerial direction

French Customs Direction Générale des Douanes et Droits Indirects
- French Customs logo
- Common name: la douane

Agency overview
- Formed: 1791
- Annual budget: €1.66 billion (2020)

Jurisdictional structure
- Operations jurisdiction: France
- Specialist jurisdiction: Customs, excise, gambling

Operational structure
- Headquarters: 11, Rue des Deux Communes, Montreuil, Seine-Saint-Denis
- Elected officer responsible: Gérald Darmanin, Junior Minister for the Budget
- Parent agency: Ministry of the Economy, Industry and Employment; Minister for the Budget, Public Accounts and the Civil Service

Website
- www.douane.gouv.fr

The Directorate-General of Customs and Indirect Taxes (French: Direction générale des douanes et droits indirects, DGDDI), commonly known as les douanes (Customs), is the customs service of France. It is responsible for levying indirect taxes, preventing smuggling, surveilling borders and investigating counterfeit money. The agency acts as a coast guard, border guard, sea rescue organisation, and customs service. In addition, since 1995, the agency has replaced the Border Police units of the National Police in carrying out immigration control at smaller border checkpoints, in particular at maritime borders and regional airports.

The Directorate-general is controlled by the Minister for the Budget, Public Accounts and the Civil Service (French: Ministère du Budget, des Comptes publics et de la Fonction publique) at the Ministry of the Economy, Industry and Employment. It is normally known simply as "la douane", individual officers being referred to as "douaniers". Officers are routinely armed.

== History ==
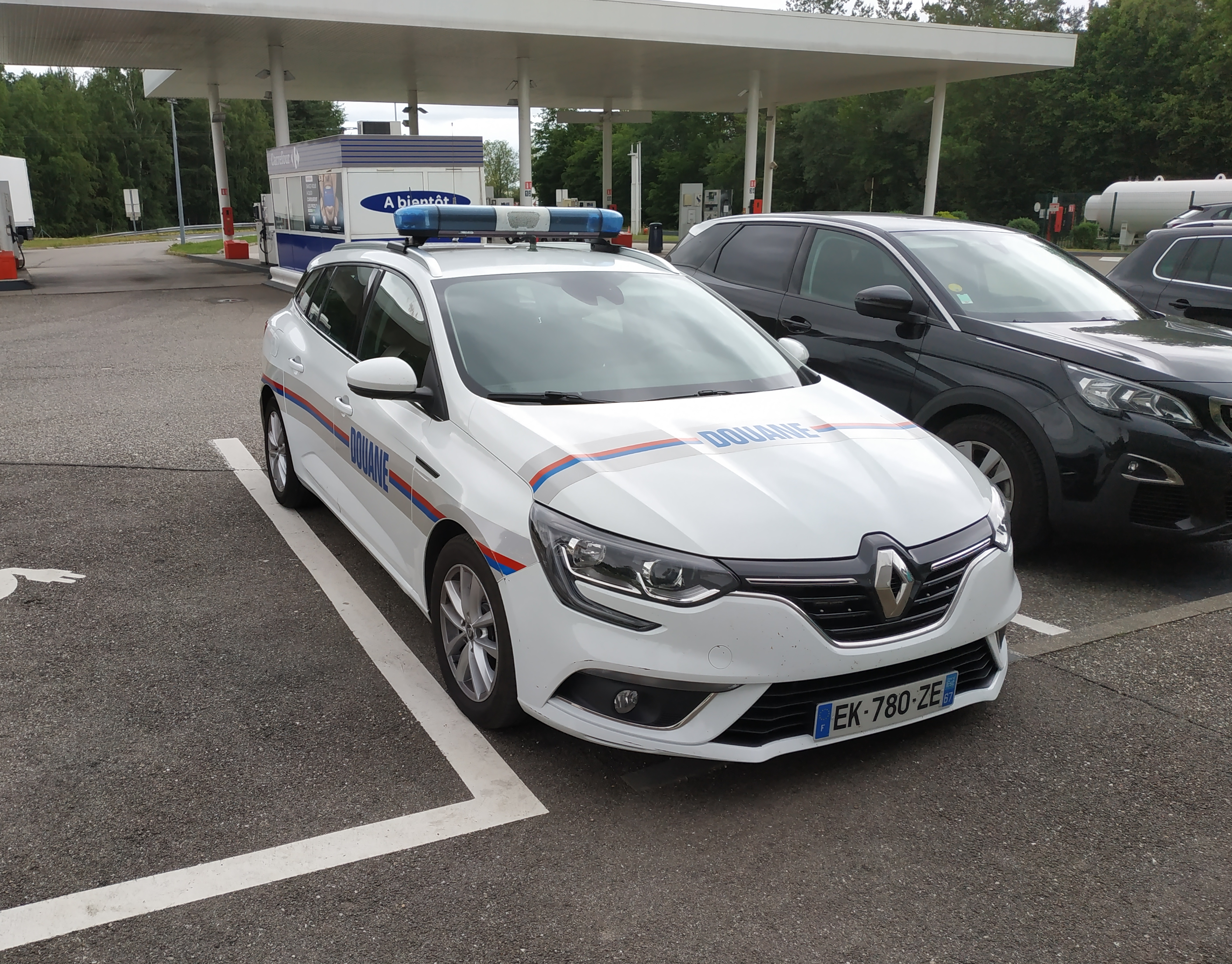
Renault Mégane patrol unit of the French Customs

The first French customs service was called the ferme générale ("General Farm") and operated under the monarchy. The ferme générale was a private company which bought each year the right to collect taxes. After the French Revolution, the General Farm was dismantled and the French Customs, as a State service created. Shortly after the instauration of Empire, the Customs gained a military status. Some personnels were affected in bureaux (port or office-based staff who were tasked to apply customs measures to the goods entering and leaving France), others in brigades (mobile detachments organized and equipped to patrol the borders and arrest smugglers).

During French wars, notably the Franco-Prussian War and the First World War, the brigades were used to form marksmen units and to track enemy units trying to infiltrate French lines. During WW1, due to their knowledge of the areas and their experience in human tracking, they were part of Corps Francs (small units which were tasked to operate behind German lines to collect intelligence and perform sabotages on enemy targets). The red stripe on their uniforms is a remaining of the decoration of one of their officers, Capitaine Cutsaert during the Napoleonic Wars

The military customs service fought in the early part of the Second World War but was disbanded on June 22, 1940, after the French defeat and was never reconstituted as a military service. The most plausible reason was the downsizing of the French Military due to the 1940 armistice Nonetheless, small units of customs men from customs posts in French Indochina fought against the Japanese as guerilla units until the end of the war.

The Musée national des douanes located in Bordeaux, France, presents the history of French customs.

== Jurisdiction ==
France has land borders with other members of the European Union Customs Union Belgium, Luxembourg, Germany, Italy, Monaco and Spain. European Union laws prohibit systematic customs checks at any border between two members of its Customs Union. So, there are no permanent customs facilities at the borders with these countries. However, France has borders with non members of this Union: Switzerland, Andorra, Brazil and Suriname. At these borders are located customs facilities. Moreover, there are many facilities inland. French Customs are allowed to search vehicles, merchandises and individuals anywhere France according to the French Customs Code, article 60.

French Customs, in addition to their main missions, are also tasked to perform immigration controls at the following airports and ports at the external border of the Schengen Area:

Airports

- Annecy Airport
- Béziers Airport
- Brest Airport
- Carcassonne Airport
- Dinard Airport
- Grenoble Airport
- Le Havre Airport
- Montpellier Airport
- Nîmes Airport
- Pau Pyrénées Airport
- Perpignan Airport
- Poitiers Airport
- Rennes Airport
- Rouen Airport
- Quimper Airport
- Saint-Étienne – Bouthéon Airport
- Tarbes-Lourdes-Pyrénées Airport
- Toulon Airport
- Tours Airport

Maritime ports

- Bayonne port
- Brest port
- Granville port
- Roscoff port
- Rouen port
- Vendres port

Railway stations

- Bourg-Saint-Maurice station
- Moûtiers–Salins–Brides-les-Bains station

The French customs service carries out customs checks only at the following airports, ports and stations at the external border of the Schengen Area:

Airports

- Ajaccio Airport
- EuroAirport Basel-Mulhouse-Freiburg
- Bastia Airport
- Beauvais-Tillé Airport
- Biarritz Airport
- Bordeaux Airport
- Calvi Airport
- Clermont-Ferrand Airport
- Figari Airport
- Lille Airport
- Lyon-Bron Airport
- Lyon-Saint Exupéry Airport
- Marseille Airport
- Nantes Atlantique Airport
- Nice Airport
- Paris-Charles de Gaulle Airport
- Paris-Orly Airport
- Strasbourg Airport
- Toulouse-Blagnac Airport

Maritime ports

- Ajaccio port
- Bastia port
- Bonifacio port
- Bordeaux port
- Boulogne-sur-Mer port
- Calais port
- Calvi port
- Cherbourg port
- Dunkerque port
- Marseille port
- Port-la-Nouvelle port
- Saint Malo port
- Sète port

Railway stations

- Calais Fréthun station
- Lille Europe station
- Paris-Nord station
- Marne-la-Vallée–Chessy Station

== Organisation ==
The customs headquarters is in Montreuil (Paris). The agency consists of one national headquarter (Cabinet of the General Director, six sub-directorates and supporting services), national departments and local directorates:

=== Administration centrale, national headquarters ===
  - Sub-directorates (A: Human Resources, B: Budget, C: IT, D: Legal affairs, E: International Trade, F: Indirect Taxation)
  - Département des statistiques et des études économiques, Statistics and Economic studies department;
  - Inspection des services (IS), internal auditing;
  - Bureau de l'information et de la communication (BIC), Office of Information and Communication;
  - DRI, Delegation for International Relations;
  - CCG, Management Control Unit;
  - General Director’s Office – General Affairs;

=== Services à Compétence Nationale, national departments ===
  - Direction nationale garde-côtes des douanes (DNGCD) based in Le Havre, under the supervision of the Sub-directorate Réseau. It is composed of three coast guard services (services garde-côtes des douanes), in Nantes – covering the Atlantic and English Channel region, Marseille for the Mediterranean sea, and Fort-de-France for the Antilles and French Guyane seas;
  - Direction nationale du recrutement et de la formation professionnelle (DNRFP) based in Tourcoing, under the supervision of the Sub-directorate A. It is composed of the two training facilities, in Tourcoing and La Rochelle;
  - Direction nationale du renseignement et des enquêtes douanières (DNRED), which acts both as an intelligence agency and as a very serious investigations services with headquarters in Ivry, near Paris (formerly Vincennes) and substations all across France;
  - Direction nationale des statistiques et du commerce extérieur (DNSCE), formerly a statistical service, currently a datacenter and IT engineering agency, based in Toulouse, under the supervision of the Sub-directorate C;
  - Centre informatique douanier (CID), a datacenter and IT engineering agency based in Osny, under the supervision of the Sub-directorate C;
  - Service national de la douane judiciaire (SNDJ), a judicial investigative service based in Ivry in the same building as the DNRED. Like the DNRED it has substations in France but not always in the same cities.
  - Service commun des laboratoires (SCL), providing scientific support and legal analysis in laboratories. This service depends both of the French Customs and the Direction Générale de la Concurrence, de la Consommation et de la Répression des Fraudes;
  - Unité d'Informations Passagers – Passenger Name Record (UIP-PNR), Passenger's Information Unit, the French part of the PNR, a joint unit (with the National Police;
  - Musée National des Douanes (MND), the Museum;
  - Service d'Analyses de Risques et de Ciblages (SARC) which uses big-data to produce risk analysis to help local services to better detect frauds, under the supervision of the Sub-directorate D;

=== Decentralised Services ===
France is divided into 12 Directions inter-régionales (Inter-region Directorates). These 12 are divided into Directions régionales (Region Directorates).

- 42 are inland directorate, which typically consists of:
  - Managerial, training and logistic services;
  - Customs Bureaux: dealing with commerce;
  - Customs Brigades: Squads dealing with surveillance;
  - Two regional units, the Service Régional d'Enquêtes (SRE) Regional Service of (serious frauds) Investigations, Service Régional d'Audits (SRA) Regional Service of audits (before giving them a "trustee" status);
  - A wines unit;

== Legal Framework ==
Unlike the French National Police, Municipal Polices and the French Gendarmerie, most customs officers do not gain their powers from the Code de Procédure Pénale (Code Of Criminal Procedure) but from the Code des Douanes National (National Customs Code). They can:

- search vehicles of any kind, merchandises, people, artificial islands, installations and constructions of the continental shelf and the exclusive economic zone, commercial buildings and habitations;
- perform drug tests on individuals;
- order a driver to stop, and if he does not comply use all necessary means to immobilize him;
- divert a ship to a French port;
- seize documents and merchandises;
- consult files of many administrations and nearly all companies which move goods or accomplish customs operations;
- open boxes send by postal service or express fret companies;
- perform identity checks, infiltrate criminal organizations
- investigate both nationally and internationally with foreign customs;
- requisition qualified people;
- take samples;

Some of these operations require prior approval by a magistrate.

However, the personnels of the SNDJ, nicknamed Officiers de Douane Judiciaire (ODJ), can not use these powers. They gained their powers from the Code of Criminal Procedure.

== Personnel ==
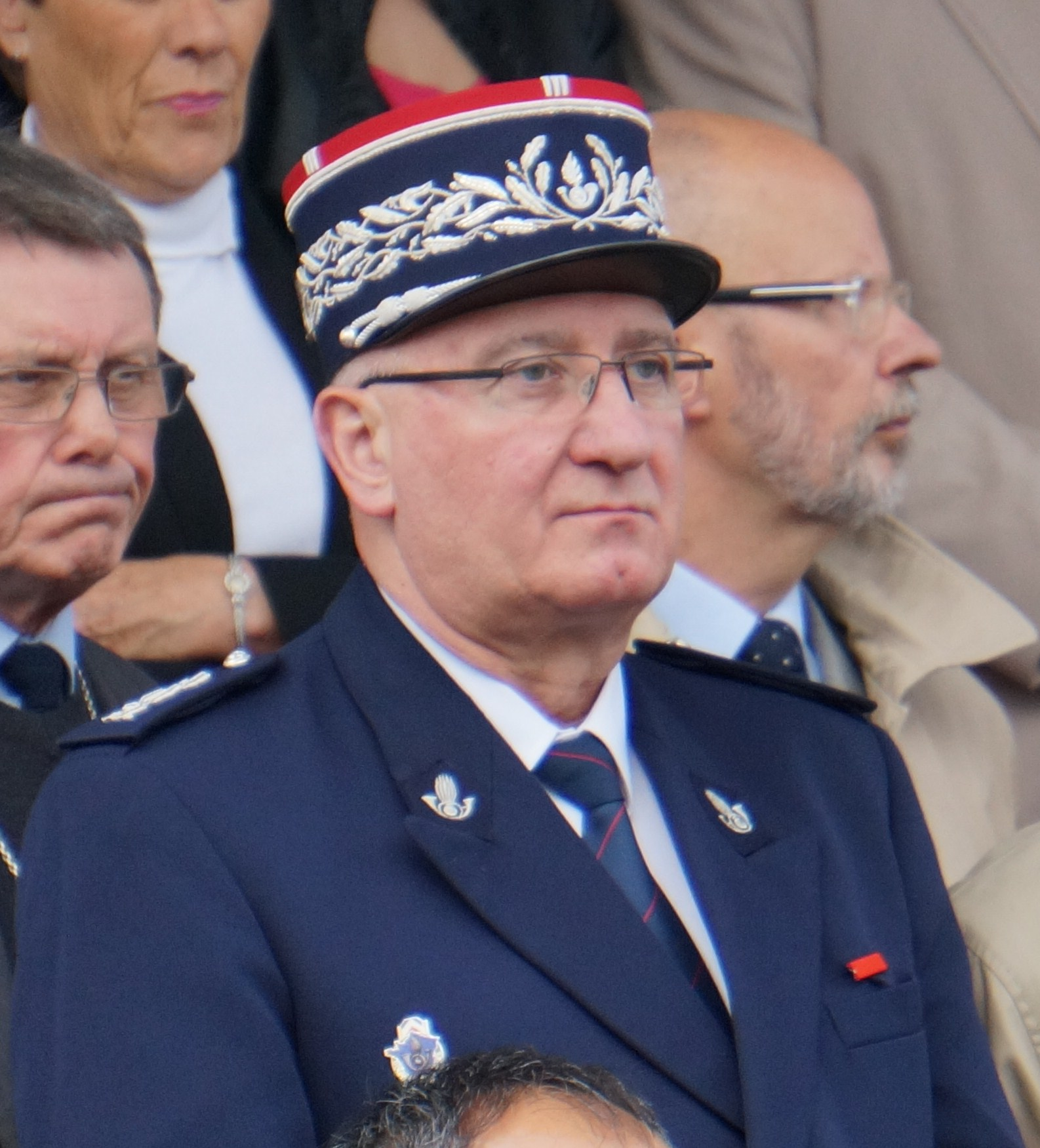
Administrateur in uniform for land based officers (with silver insignia and képi).

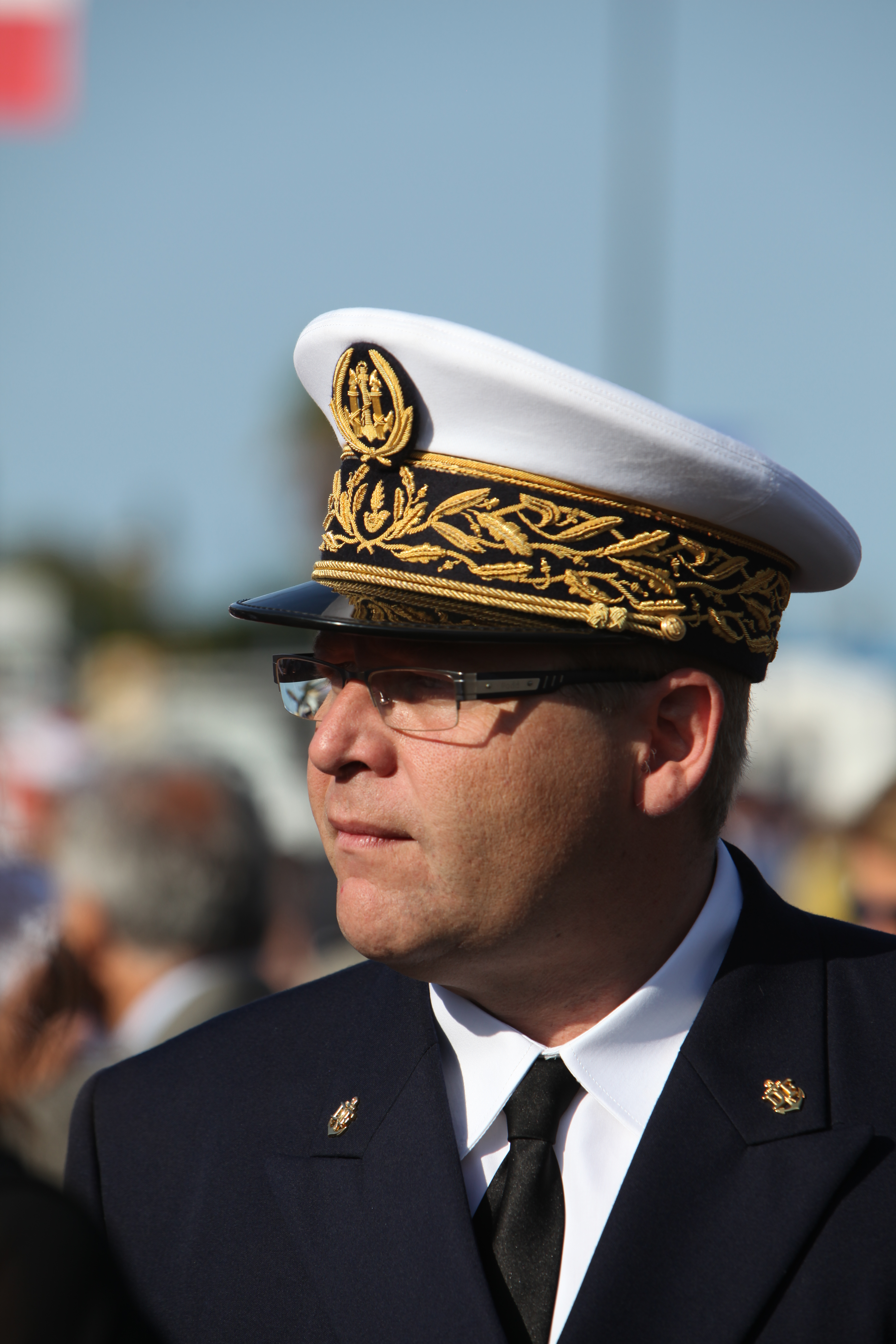
Administrateur in uniform for sea and air officers (with gold insignia)

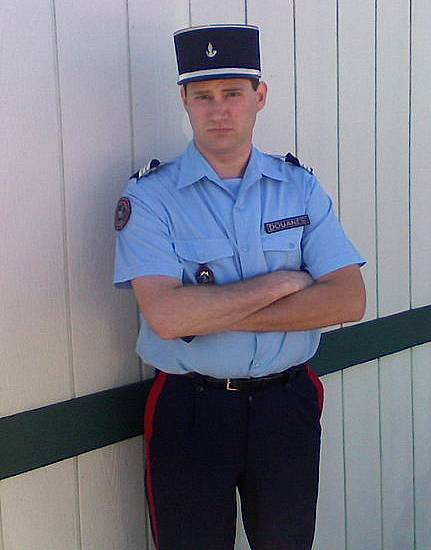
Agent de constatation de 1re classe.

Category A (inspecteurs des douanes) is recruited from holders of a bachelor's degree; category B (contrôleurs) is recruited from holders of a high school diploma giving access to university studies; category C (agents de constatation) from holders of a vocational high school diploma.

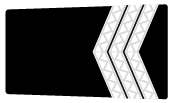
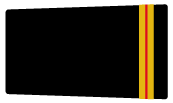
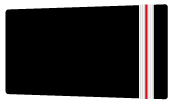
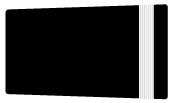
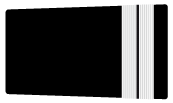
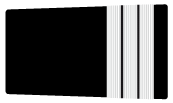
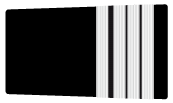
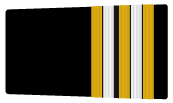
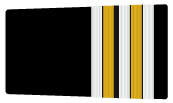
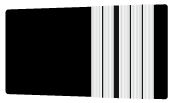
CATEGORY C			CATEGORY B			CATEGORY A
Agent de constatation	Agent de constatation principal de 2^{e} classe	Agent de constatation principal de 1^{re} classe	Contrôleur de 2^{e} classe	Contrôleur de 1^{re} classe	Contrôleur principal	Inspecteur	Inspecteur régional	Inspecteur principale	Directeur

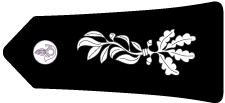
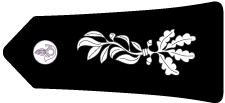
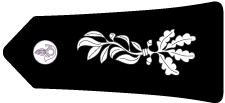
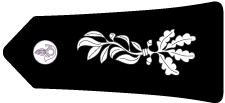
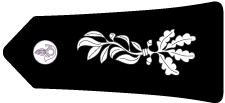
ADMINISTRATORS
no pips	+ 2 pips	+ 3 pips	+ 4 pips	+ 5 pips
Administrateur	Administrateur supérieur	Administrateur général	Directeur général adjoint	Directeur général

== Armament and equipment ==
=== Air ===
In 2010 the aircraft fleet consisted of Reims-Cessna F406 maritime patrol aircraft; and Eurocopter EC-135 and Aérospatiale AS355 helicopters. Two Reims-Cessna F406s operated out of Martinique and the rest were based in metropolitan France.

From 2012 onwards eight Beechcraft King Air 350s replaced the F406s.

=== Maritime ===
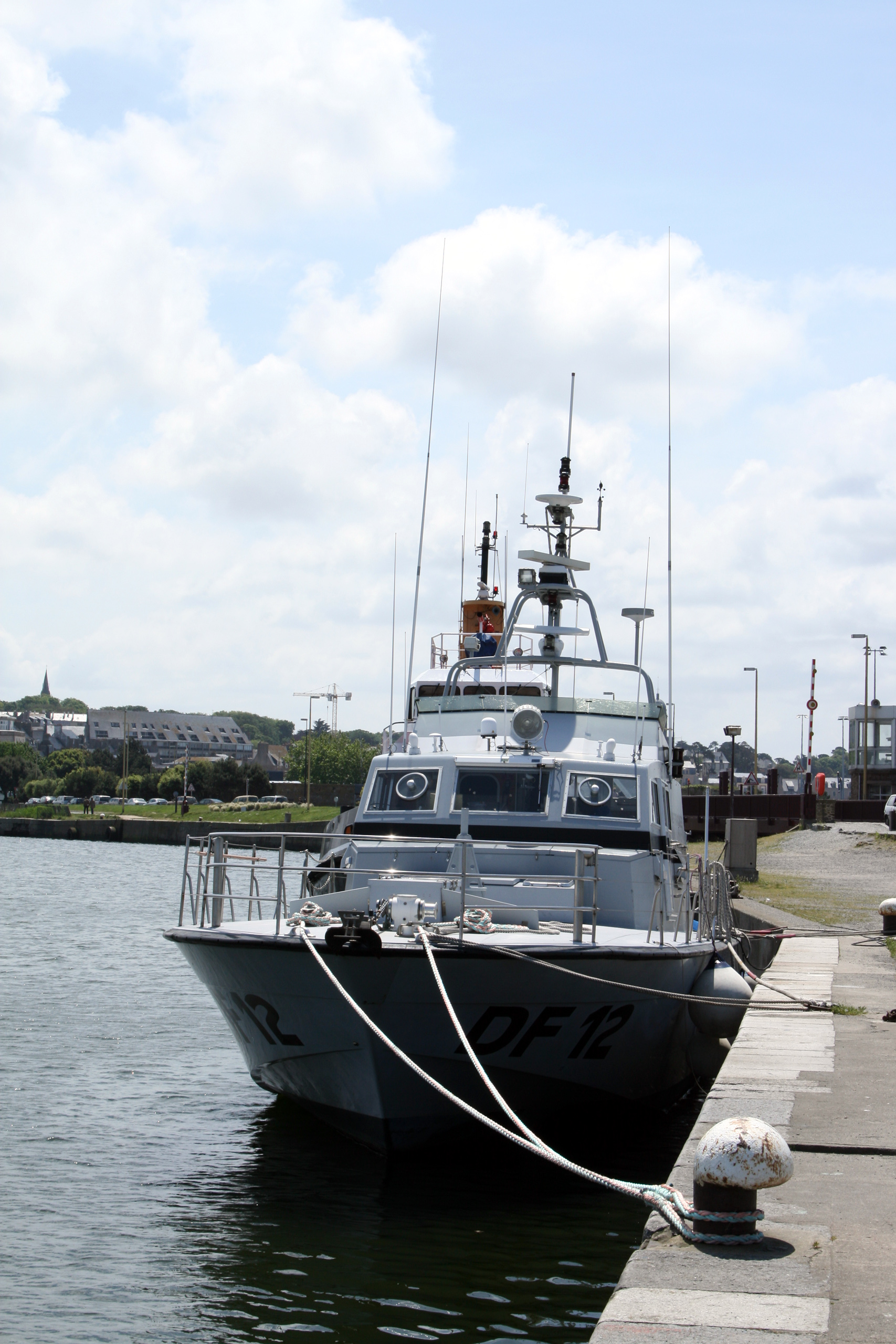
Swift boat Noroit (DF12), a Haize Hegoa type patrol boat of the French customs, moored in Saint-Malo

In 2010 the customs had 3 offshore patrol boats, 18 coastal patrol boats, 18 surveillance patrol boats and 5 speed boats. The boats are assigned as follows:

- North sea/Channel:

1 Offshore Patrol Boat
2 Coastal Patrol Boat
1 Surveillance Patrol Boat
2 speed boats

- Atlantic

1 Offshore Patrol Boat
4 Coastal Patrol Boat
3 Surveillance Patrol Boat
2 speed boats

- Mediterranean

1 Offshore Patrol Boat
8 Coastal Patrol Boat
8 Surveillance Patrol Boat

- Antilles/South America

4 Coastal Patrol Boat
5 Surveillance Patrol Boat

- Polynesia

1 Offshore Patrol Boat
1 Speed boat

=== Ground forces ===
As of 2008 the Customs service had 3255 vehicles (including 355 motorbikes).

=== Small Arms ===
Customs Agents are now armed with the 9 mm SIG Sauer SP 2022 pistols as the standard issued sidearm, a French custom-tailored variant of the SIG Sauer Pro. The pistol was ordered to replace the several revolvers in service.
