= No. 154 Squadron RAF =

Defunct flying squadron of the Royal Air Force

No. 154 (Motor Industries) Squadron RAF
- Active: 7 August 1918 – 11 September 1918; 15 June 1941 – 1 Nov 1944; 16 Nov 1944 – 31 March 1945
- Country: United Kingdom
- Branch: Royal Air Force
- Nickname: Motor Industries
- Mottos: His modis ad victoriam Latin: By this means to Victory

Insignia
- Squadron Badge: A road sign in front of three arrows.
- Squadron Codes: HT (Nov 1941 – Nov 1942, Jun 1943 – Oct 1944) ) HG (Nov 1944 – Mar 1945)

No. 154 (Motor Industries) Squadron RAF was a Royal Air Force squadron formed as a fighter unit in the Second World War.

== History ==
=== Formation and World War I ===
No. 154 Squadron Royal Air Force was formed on 7 August 1918, but was disbanded on 11 September having not received any aircraft.

=== Reformation in World War II ===
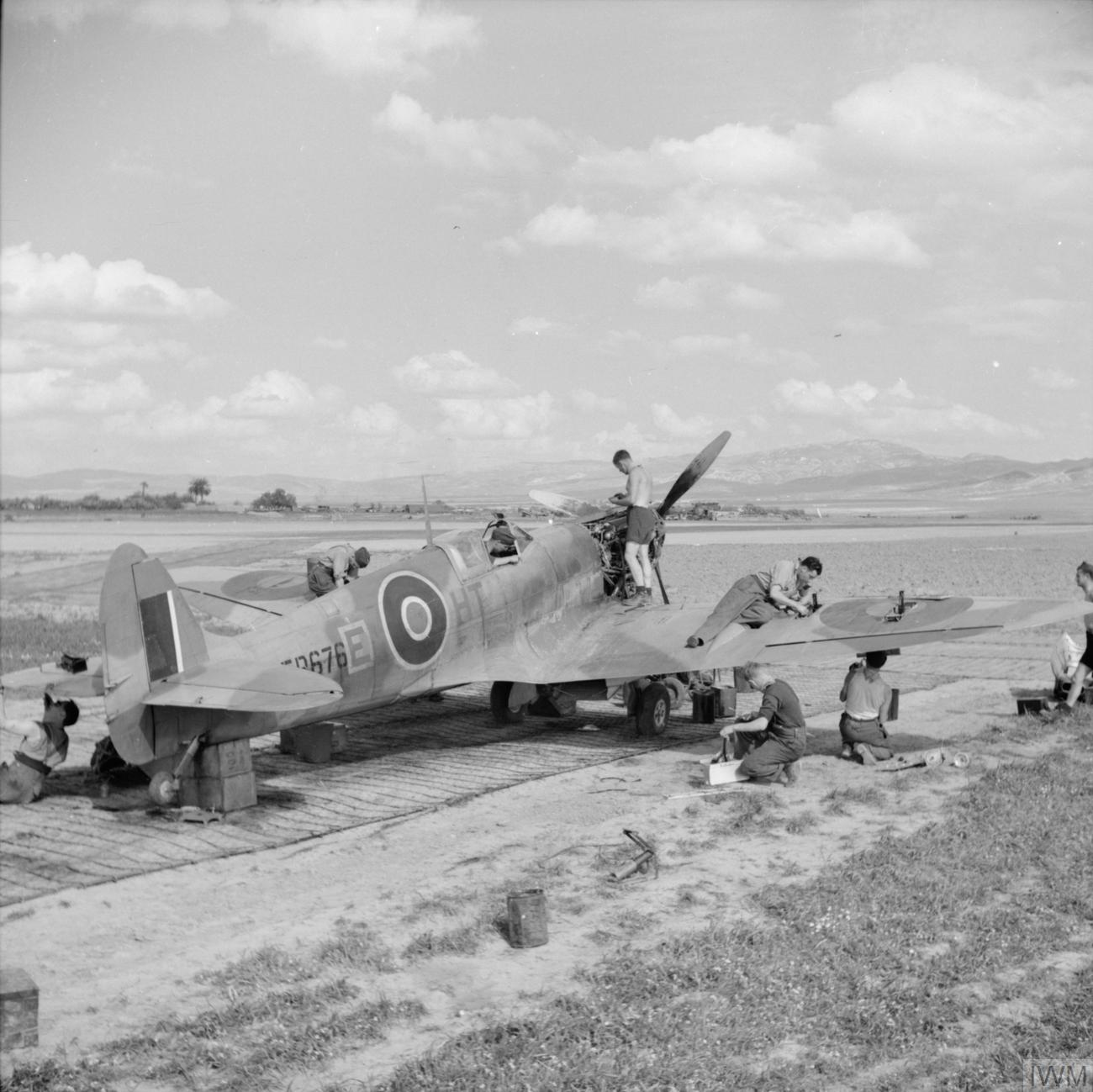
Ground crew servicing a Supermarine Spitfire of No. 154 Squadron in its dispersal at Souk el Khemis ('Victoria'), Tunisia.

The squadron reformed in November 1941 at RAF Fowlmere as a fighter squadron equipped with Spitfire IIAs. It was briefly located in the south west of England then based at RAF Hornchurch. In November 1942 it moved to Gibraltar and Algeria to take part in Operation Torch. On 4 June 1943 it arrived in Malta, it then operated from Palestine and Cyprus. From 23 August 1944 it was based at Fréjus, France, providing air cover for the forces that moved north to join those that had landed at Normandy. It was disbanded in Naples on 1 November 1944, but reformed on 16 November 1944 at RAF Biggin Hill to escort bombers and flew Mustangs until it was finally disbanded on 31 March 1945.

== Aircraft operated ==
Aircraft operated by No. 154 Squadron RAF
From	To	Aircraft	Variant
Nov 1941	Apr 1942	Supermarine Spitfire	IIA
Jan 1942	Apr 1942	Supermarine Spitfire	IIB
Feb 1942	Apr 1942	Supermarine Spitfire	VA
Feb 1942	Aug 1943	Supermarine Spitfire	VB
Nov 1942	Feb 1944	Supermarine Spitfire	VC
Jul 1943	Oct 1944	Supermarine Spitfire	IX
Aug 1944	Oct 1944	Supermarine Spitfire	VIII
Nov 1944	Feb 1945	Supermarine Spitfire	VII
Feb 1945	Mar 1945	P-51 Mustang	IV
