= Envela =

American recommerce company

Envela Corporation
- Logo as used in SEC filings

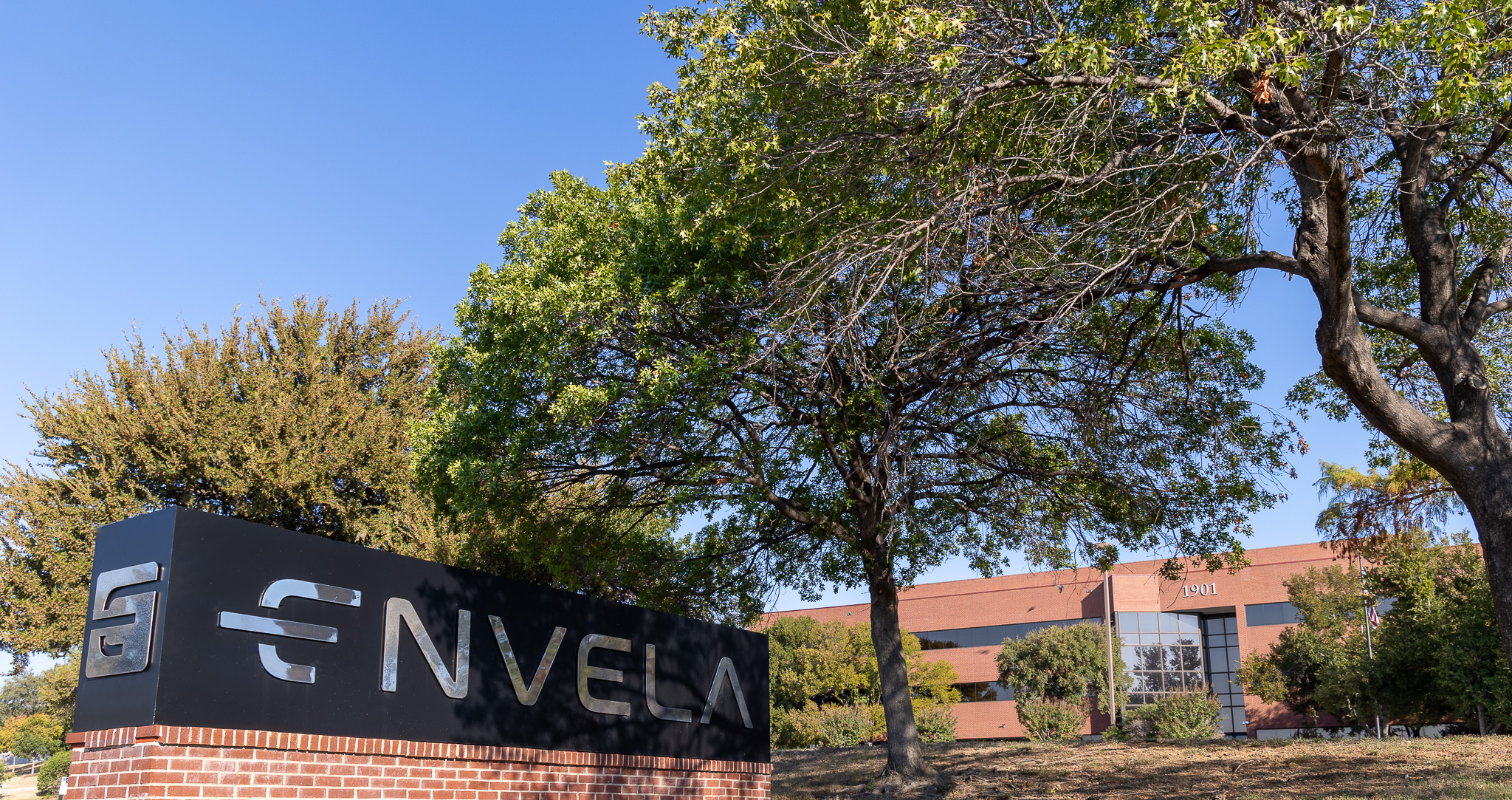
- Headquarters in Las Colinas, Texas (2025)
- Type: Public company
- Traded as: AMEX: ELA; Russell 2000 component
- Industry: Recommerce
- Founded: September 17, 1965, as Canyon State Mining Corporation; December 12, 2019, renamed Envela Corporation.
- Headquarters: Las Colinas, Irving, Texas, U.S.
- Key people: John Loftus, CEO; John DeLuca, CFO
- Revenue: US$180.4 million (2024)
- Operating income: US$8.2 million (2024)
- Net income: US$6.8 million (2024)
- Total assets: US$77.9 million (2024)
- Total equity: US$52.7 million (2024)
- Number of employees: 309 (2024)
- Subsidiaries: Four Nines; ITAD USA; Echo Lifecycle Services
- Website: envela.com

Envela Corporation is a U.S.-based company that provides recommerce services aimed at extending product lifecycles and reducing resource consumption. The company operates through two primary segments: consumer and commercial.

The consumer segment specializes in the purchase and resale of pre-owned luxury goods, including fine jewelry, diamonds, gemstones, watches, and bullion. It operates several retail brands, some of which date back to 1972. The segment focuses on authenticated products and operates within the circular economy by reselling items from well-known luxury brands and vintage collections.

The commercial segment centers on IT asset disposition (ITAD), offering services such as data destruction, device refurbishment, resale, and trade-in. Envela's ITAD business partners with major retailers and other organizations, providing a white-labeled trade-in platform that allows customers to sell used electronic devices. Devices are processed to extend their lifespan or are responsibly recycled. In addition to ITAD, the commercial segment manages the disposition of end-of-life electronics, including recycling and the recovery of precious and base metals. These operations began between 2007 and 2009.

== History ==
=== Origins as Canyon State Mining (1965–1981) ===
The company's origins trace back to Canyon State Mining Corporation, a speculative Nevada-based mining venture founded in 1965. Originally formed to capitalize on the sulfur boom of the 1960s, the company focused on mining claims in Humboldt and Pershing Counties. Its early funding was unconventional: in 1965, its founder Charles Branstetter secured financing for his venture by personally offering registered shares to patrons at the Bucket of Blood Saloon in Virginia City, Nevada, after traditional investment banks declined to underwrite the offering; the shares were later listed on the over-the-counter market. Although Canyon State never reached commercial production, it remained a public shell until Lenny Smith repurposed it in the early 1980s to enter the precious metals industry. This public vehicle eventually acquired DGSE in 1987, forming a retail-focused business.

=== DGSE era (1981–2016) ===
Before its transformation, the company operated as DGSE Companies, Inc., a Texas-based retailer specializing in bullion, estate jewelry, and related services. Its roots date to 1981, when entrepreneur Lenny Smith acquired control of the public company and shifted its focus toward precious metals ventures. The company's first major acquisition was American Pacific Mint (APM), a producer of investment-grade silver bullion in Azusa, California. Facing growing competition from government bullion programs such as the American Silver Eagle, first released in late 1986, APM adjusted its business strategy.

In 1987, the company expanded by acquiring Dallas Gold & Silver Exchange, a respected Dallas-based retailer of jewelry and precious metals. By 1992, the company formally adopted the Dallas Gold and Silver Exchange name and relocated its headquarters to Dallas, Texas. In July 2001, they began to use the DGSE name. Over the next two decades, DGSE expanded through retail growth, early adoption of e-commerce platforms by the mid-1990s, and acquisition of regional jewelers. These efforts positioned DGSE as an early leader in online precious metals sales.

In 2007, DGSE acquired Superior Galleries, a Beverly Hills-based auction house, in an effort to diversify. Integration challenges, combined with the 2009 collapse of its financier Stanford International Bank, which was later implicated in a Ponzi scheme, resulted in significant financial and reputational damage. Following this acquisition, DGSE incurred heavy losses, exited the auction and pawn businesses, and faced SEC investigations into accounting irregularities. These developments coincided with the departure of former principal executive Lenny Smith and led to leadership changes and restated financials.

Between 2012 and 2016, DGSE cycled through three CEOs, each attempting to stabilize the company amid ongoing losses. The firm received a delisting notice from the NYSE MKT exchange and was ranked among U.S. retailers most likely to default, marking a challenging chapter in its history.

=== Transformation into Envela (2017–present) ===
Envela Corporation emerged in 2017 from a period of financial instability under new CEO John Loftus. A turnaround strategy included a 2019 expansion into electronics recycling and IT asset disposition through the acquisitions of Echo Environmental, ITAD USA, and Teladvance.

== Timeline ==
1965 – Canyon State Mining Corporation is incorporated in Nevada, focusing on sulfur deposits.

1981 – Lenny Smith acquires a controlling interest and renames the company Canyon State Corporation.

1986 – The company acquires American Pacific Mint and rebrands as The American Pacific Mint, Inc.

1987 – Acquires Dallas Gold & Silver Exchange (DGSE) and purchases its primary operations facility in Dallas, Texas.

1992 – Moves company headquarters to Dallas, Texas and renames the business Dallas Gold & Silver Exchange Inc.

1995 – Launches Computer Jewelry Exchange, an early online auction platform for jewelry.

1998 – Acquires the National Jewelry Exchange pawn shop, expanding retail footprint.

1999 – Begins trading on the NASDAQ SmallCap Market under the ticker symbol DGSE; also acquires assets of The Silverman Group.

2000 – Opens the Charleston Gold & Diamond Exchange superstore in South Carolina.

2007 – Acquires Superior Galleries and begins trading on the American Stock Exchange (AMEX) under the symbol DGC.

2009 – Shuts down Superior Galleries operations following fallout from the Stanford Financial Ponzi scandal.

2011 – Launches Bullion Express retail stores; longtime controlling executive Lenny Smith departs from leadership.

2012 – Faces SEC investigation and stock trading is temporarily suspended due to accounting irregularities.

2014 – SEC concludes enforcement action over prior inventory misstatements.

- CFO John Benson was fined $75,000 and permanently barred from serving as an officer or director of a public company after overstating inventory.
- CEO Lenny Smith repaid $106,250 and returned 59,738 shares received as performance-based compensation during the misstatement period.

2012–2016: Leadership Turnover and Continued Losses

- 2012 – Jim Vierling is appointed CEO, President, and Chairman in October. A former executive at the company's Southern Bullion subsidiary, he initiates cost-cutting measures and store consolidations in an effort to stabilize the business.
- 2014 – Dusty Clem replaces Vierling as CEO, continuing efforts to streamline operations. The company remains unprofitable during his tenure.
- 2015 – Matthew Peakes takes over as CEO, President, and Chairman. DGSE relocates its flagship store and faces a delisting notice from the NYSE MKT due to financial struggles.

2016 – Following release of its 2016 financials, S&P Global Market Intelligence ranked DGSE as the second most likely U.S. retailer to default within 12 months, behind only Sears Holdings.

2016 – John Loftus appointed CEO; under his ongoing leadership, the company returns to profitability and significantly expands its retail presence while establishing a new Commercial Division, driving overall business growth.

2017 – Returns to profitability and regains NYSE MKT compliance; initiates turnaround strategy.

2019 – Rebrands as Envela Corporation; acquires Echo Environmental, ITAD USA, and Teladvance, expanding into electronics recycling and IT asset disposition.

2020 – Reports $114 million in revenue; Consumer Division leads growth. Company is added to the Russell 2000 Index.

2021 – Revenue increases to $141 million; expands Commercial Division through additional acquisitions.

2022 – Achieves $183 million in annual revenue; reports strong performance in both Consumer and Commercial Divisions.

2023 – Revenue declines slightly to $172 million amid macroeconomic headwinds; announces plans for retail expansion.

2024 – Nearly doubles retail locations and enters new geographic markets; annual revenue increases to $180 million.
