= No. 328 Squadron RAF =

No. 328 (GC I/7 'Provence') Squadron RAF
- Active: 1 December 1943 – November 1945
- Country: United Kingdom
- Allegiance: Free French Forces
- Branch: Royal Air Force
- Nickname(s): GC I/7 'Provence'

Insignia
- Squadron Badge heraldry: None
- Squadron code: S8 (December 1943 – November 1945)

No. 328 (GC/I/7 'Provence') Squadron RAF was a Free French fighter squadron given a Royal Air Force squadron number during World War II.

== History ==
The squadron was formed in Ajaccio, Corsica on 1 December 1943 from Group de Chasse I/7 Provence squadron that had been based in North Africa. It was equipped with British Spitfire aircraft.

The squadron followed the Allied advance through Europe from Southern France supporting the Free French Army and by April 1945 was operating from Grossachsenheim, Germany. It was under RAF control until November 1945 when it disbanded upon reversion to French control.

== Aircraft operated ==
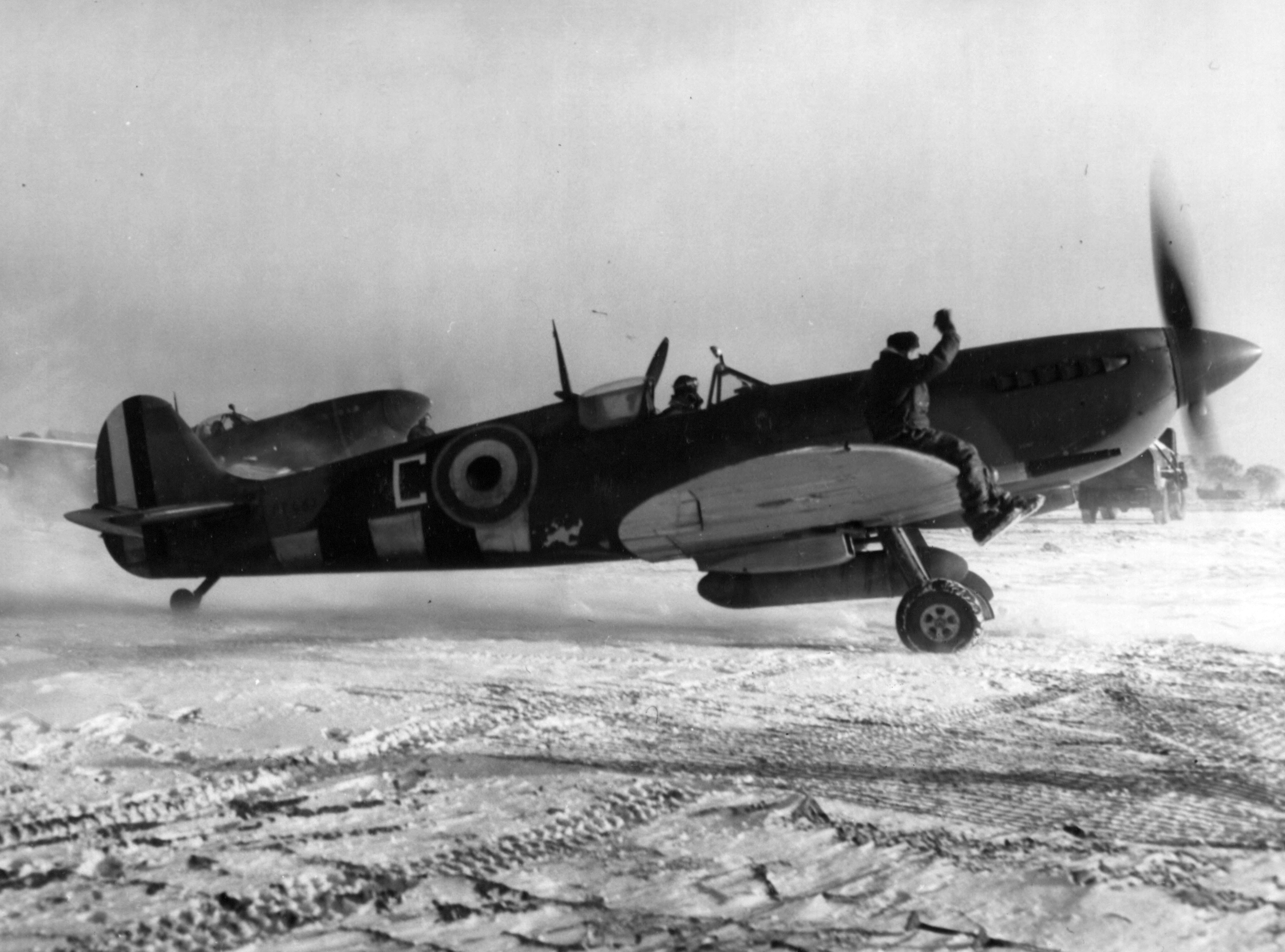
328 Squadron Spitfire IX in early 1945

Aircraft operated by no. 328 Squadron RAF
From	To	Aircraft	Variant
Dec 1943	Sep 1944	Supermarine Spitfire	VC
Apr 1944	Nov 1945	Supermarine Spitfire	IX
Jun 1944	Nov 1945	Supermarine Spitfire	VIII
