= No. 326 Squadron RAF =

No. 326 (GC II/7 'Nice') Squadron RAF
- Active: 1 December 1943 – November 1945
- Country: United Kingdom
- Allegiance: France
- Branch: Royal Air Force
- Nickname(s): GC II/7 'Nice'

Insignia
- Squadron Badge heraldry: None
- Squadron code: QU (December 1943 – November 1945)

No. 326 (GC.II/7 'Nice') Squadron RAF was a French Air Force fighter squadron, briefly under Royal Air Force command during World War II. Keeping its Spitfires, it was transferred to USAAF command, as part of 1 Tactical Air Force (TAF).

== History ==
The squadron was formed in Calvi, Corsica on 1 December 1943 from GC/II/7 'Nice' squadron and was equipped with British Spitfire aircraft. After a brief period under RAF control, the squadron was transferred to USAAF command, together with 327 Sqn. ('Corse') and 328 Sqn. ('Provence'). All three squadrons kept their British fighters.

1 TAF was a Franco-American formation. The tactical-bomber force was Franco-American (42 BW), one fighter wing (64 FW) was American and one (71 FW) was French; a French formation operating on the Atlantic coast was later added.

The three French Spitfire squadrons formed the 1e Escadre de Chasse (1st Fighter Wing), alongside the P-47 equipped 3e and 4e Escadre sand the US P-47s of 64 FW. The three French fighter wings, in turn formed 71 FW, but with the addition of the two French reconnaissance squadrons of 33e Escadre, the entire formation was known as the 1er Corps Aérien Français (1st French Air Corps), with ten squadrons

Following the Allied Landings in Provence (Operation Dragoon), 1 TAF operated in support of the Franco-American 6th Army Group. The squadron followed the Allied advance northwards, along the Rhone valley, from Southern France. It concentrated on providing air support for the French Armee B.

By April 1945 was operating from Großsachsenheim, in Germany.

== Aircraft operated ==
Aircraft operated by No. 326 Squadron RAF
From	To	Aircraft	Variant
Dec 1943	Oct 1944	Supermarine Spitfire	VC
Apr 1944	Nov 1945	Supermarine Spitfire	IX
Jun 1944	Nov 1945	Supermarine Spitfire	VIII
