= Direction nationale du renseignement et des enquêtes douanières =

French intelligence agency (DNRED)

Directorate-General of Customs and Indirect Taxes
- Direction Générale des Douanes et Droits Indirects

Agency overview
- Formed: 1991
- Jurisdiction: Government of France
- Headquarters: 2, Rue des Deux-Communes, Montreuil, Seine-Saint-Denis, France
- Ministers responsible: Bruno Le Maire, Minister of Economics, Finance and Industrial and Digital Sovereignty; Thomas Cazenave, Minister Delegate for Public Accounts
- Website: www.douane.gouv.fr

The Direction nationale du renseignement et des enquêtes douanières (DNRED; English: "National Directorate of the Intelligence and Customs Investigations") is a French intelligence agency founded on 1 March 1988. DNRED's mission is to gather, centralise, process and disseminate information of customs origin. It fights large international smuggling networks (drugs, weapons, tobacco, cultural goods and counterfeits) by implementing specialised investigative techniques. It carries out investigations at the national or international level, taking into account private businesses. In 2009, the DNRED created a new unit, called "Cyberdouane", which role is to fight against cyber trafficking, such as illegal online gambling, money-laundering with online Casinos, the sale of illegal products online (drugs, counterfeit products, weapons,...).
