= List of United States Air Force attack squadrons =

This is a List of United States Air Force attack squadrons.

== Attack squadrons ==
Squadron	Location	Assigned	Nickname	Note
6th Attack Squadron	Holloman AFB	49th Operations Group		
9th Attack Squadron	Holloman AFB	49th Operations Group		Activated 10 Oct 2012
11th Attack Squadron	Creech AFB	432d Operations Group		
15th Attack Squadron	Creech AFB	432d Operations Group		
17th Attack Squadron	Creech AFB	732d Operations Group		
19th Attack Squadron				
20th Attack Squadron	Creech AFB	432d Operations Group		
22d Attack Squadron	Creech AFB	732d Operations Group		
29th Attack Squadron	Holloman AFB	49th Operations Group		Activated 23 Oct 2009
42d Attack Squadron	Creech AFB	432d Operations Group		Activated 9 Nov 2006
50th Attack Squadron				
62d Expeditionary Attack Squadron				Activated 16 Sep 2016
78th Attack Squadron	Nellis AFB	726th Operations Group		Activated 19 May 2006
89th Attack Squadron	Ellsworth AFB	432d Operations Group		Activated 1 Oct 2011
91st Attack Squadron	Nellis AFB	726th Operations Group	Blue Streaks	
103d Attack Squadron				
105th Attack Squadron				
111th Attack Squadron				
124th Attack Squadron				
136th Attack Squadron				
138th Attack Squadron	Hancock Field	174th Operations Group		
162d Attack Squadron				
172d Attack Squadron				
178th Attack Squadron				
184th Attack Squadron				
196th Attack Squadron				
214th Attack Squadron				
429th Attack Squadron	Holloman AFB	726th Operations Group		Activated 25 Nov 2013
482d Attack Squadron				
489th Attack Squadron	Creech AFB	432d Operations Group		
731st Expeditionary Attack Squadron	Câmpia Turzii AB	31st Operations Group		
867th Attack Squadron	Creech AFB	732d Operations Group		

== See also ==
- 49th Wing
- 432d Wing
- 926th Wing
