= List of active United States Air Force reconnaissance squadrons =

This is a list of United States Air Force reconnaissance squadrons. It covers units considered to be part of the Combat Air Force (CAF) such as bomb and fighter squadrons and serves as a break out of the comprehensive List of United States Air Force squadrons. Units in this list are primarily assigned to Air Combat Command in the United States Air Force.

When squadrons are deployed on operations overseas their names are temporarily changed to include the word "expeditionary", although when they return the names revert. However, there are some units which include the word "Expeditionary" all the time; these squadrons are provisional and may activate and inactivate at any time.

== Expeditionary Reconnaissance Squadrons (ERS) ==
| Squadron | Shield | Location | Unit | Aircraft | Note |
|---|---|---|---|---|---|
| 4th Expeditionary Reconnaissance Squadron | | Bagram Airfield | | MC-12W | Inactivated on 1 October 2014. |
| 46th Expeditionary Reconnaissance Squadron | | S.W. Asia | 387th Air Expeditionary Group | MQ-1 | Previously at Joint Base Balad |
| 60th Expeditionary Reconnaissance Squadron | | Camp Lemonnier | | MQ-1B, MQ-9A | Inactivated on 7 October 2015. |
| 62d Expeditionary Reconnaissance Squadron | | | | | Inactivated. |
| 361st Expeditionary Reconnaissance Squadron | | Kandahar Airfield | | MC-12W | Inactivated on 1 September 2014. |
| 362d Expeditionary Reconnaissance Squadron | | Joint Base Balad | | MC-12W | Inactivated. |
| 363d Expeditionary Reconnaissance Squadron | | | | | Inactivated. Previously at Prince Sultan Air Base. |

== Reconnaissance Squadrons (RS) ==
| Squadron | Shield | Location | Nickname | Aircraft | Note |
|---|---|---|---|---|---|
| 1st Reconnaissance Squadron | | Beale AFB | | U-2 | |
| 5th Reconnaissance Squadron | | Osan AB | | U-2 | |
| 6th Reconnaissance Squadron | | Holloman AFB | | RQ-1 | |
| 11th Attack Squadron | | Creech AFB | | RQ-1, MQ-1 | |
| 12th Reconnaissance Squadron | | Beale AFB | | RQ-4 | |
| 13th Reconnaissance Squadron | | Beale AFB | | RQ-4 | Reserve Unit |
| 15th Attack Squadron | | Creech AFB | "Cotton Pickers" | RQ-1, MQ-1 | |
| 17th Reconnaissance Squadron | | Creech AFB | | RQ-1, MQ-1 | |
| 18th Reconnaissance Squadron | | Creech AFB | | | |
| 30th Reconnaissance Squadron | | Creech AFB | | RQ-170 | |
| 38th Reconnaissance Squadron | | Offutt AFB | "Fighting Hellcats" | RC-135 | |
| 45th Reconnaissance Squadron | | Offutt AFB | "Sylvester" | RC/WC-135 | |
| 78th Reconnaissance Squadron | | Nellis AFB | "Bushmasters" | | Reserve Unit |
| 82d Reconnaissance Squadron | | Kadena AB | "Hog Heaven" | RC-135 | |
| 95th Reconnaissance Squadron | | RAF Mildenhall | "Kickin' Ass" | RC-135 | |
| 99th Reconnaissance Squadron | | Beale AFB | | U-2 | |
| 111th Reconnaissance Squadron | | Ellington Field | "Ace in the Hole" | MQ-1 | Texas ANG |
| 343d Reconnaissance Squadron | | Offutt AFB | | | RC-135 |
| 489th Attack Squadron | | Beale AFB, CA | | MQ-1; MQ-9 | |

== See also ==
- 904th Air Refueling Squadron
- List of United States Air Force squadrons
