= 732nd Operations Group =

732nd Operations Group

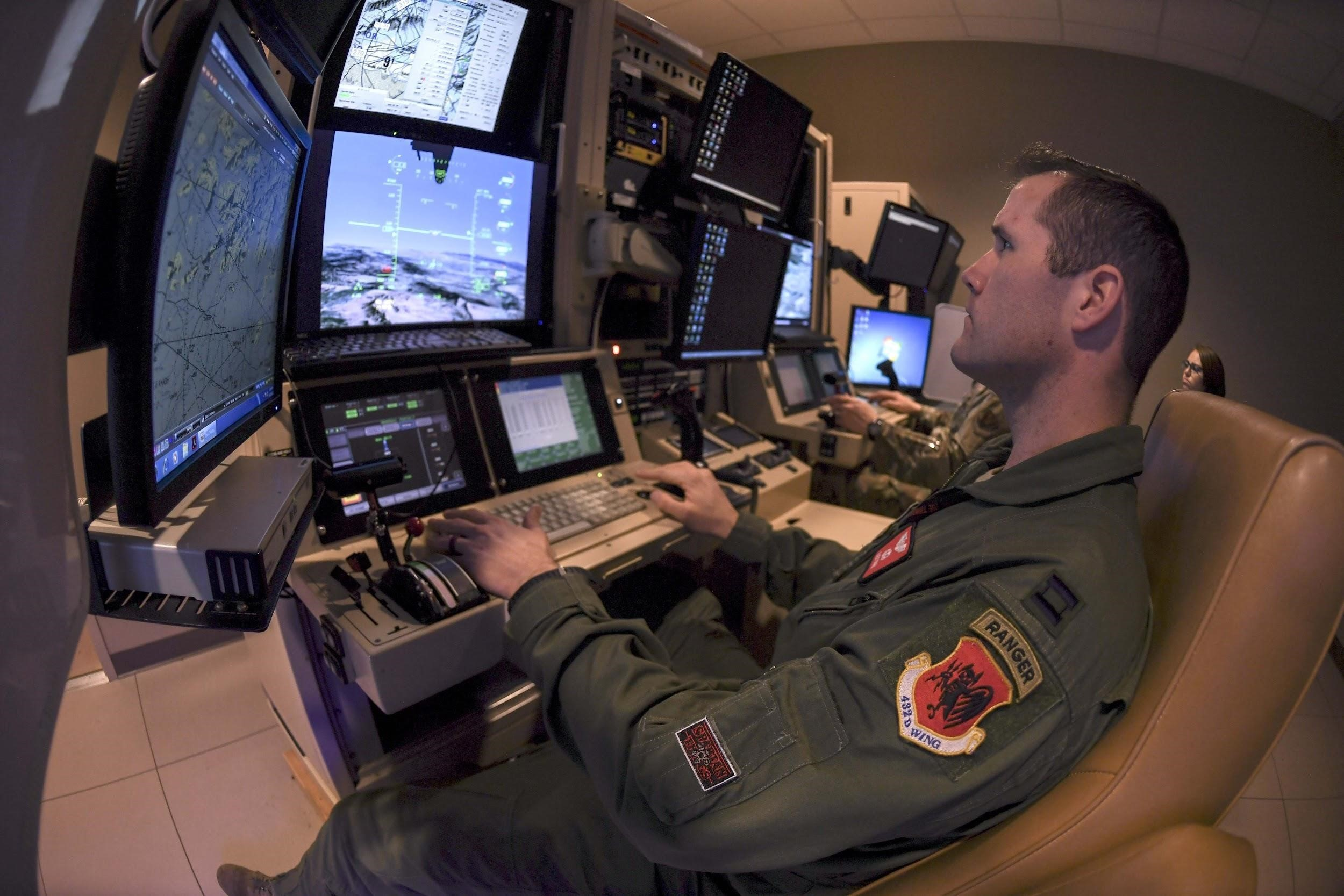
- An MQ-9 pilot of the group's 867th Attack Squadron conducts training at Creech Air Force Base, 2020
- Active: 2012–present
- Country: United States
- Branch: United States Air Force
- Part of: Air Combat Command: Fifteenth Air Force; 432nd Wing
- Garrison/HQ: Creech Air Force Base, Nevada
- Decorations: Air Force Meritorious Unit Award; Air Force Outstanding Unit Award

Insignia
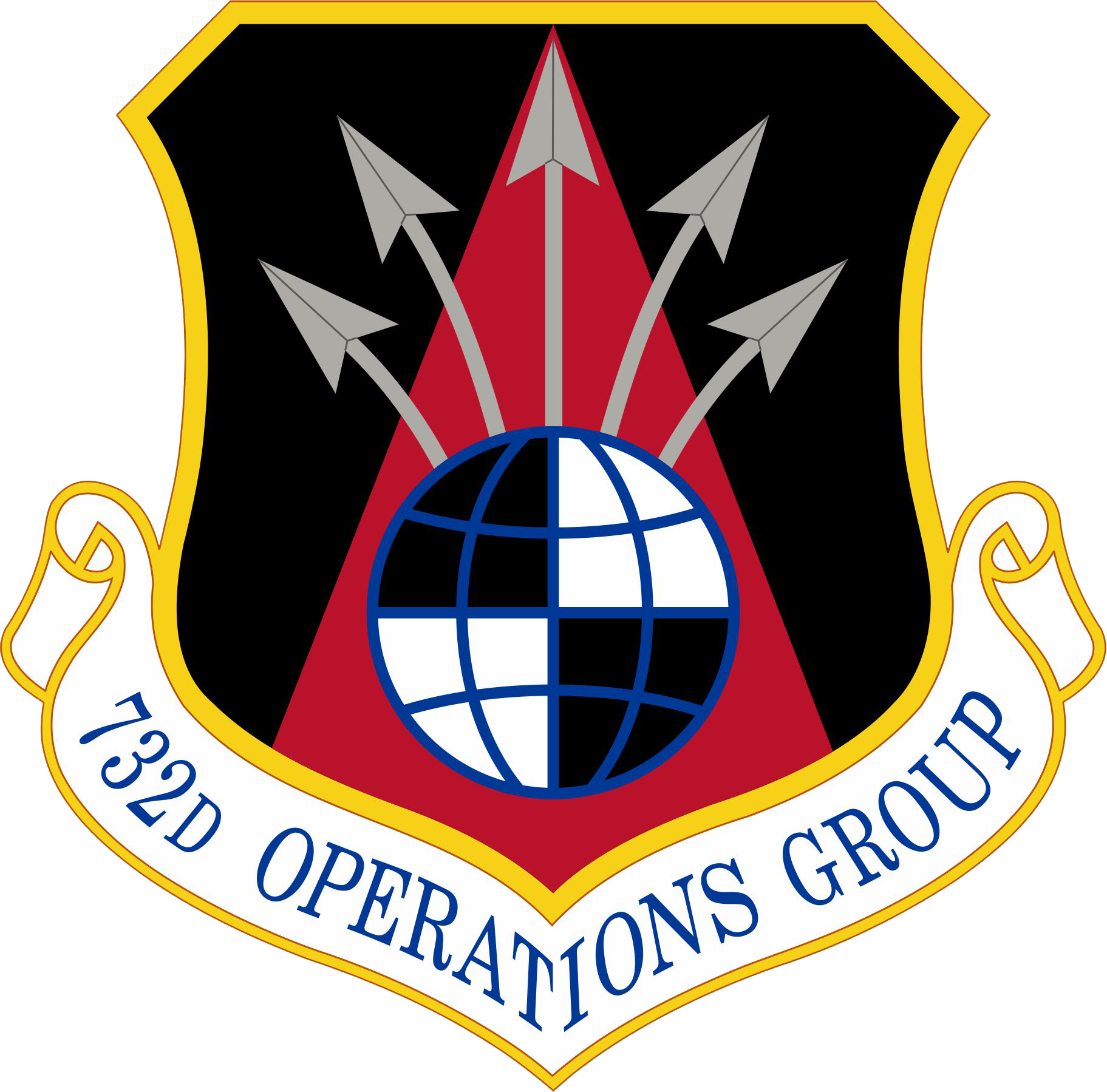
- 732nd Operations Group emblem (Note: Approved 10 December 2014.)

The 732nd Operations Group is an active unit of the United States Air Force, assigned to Air Combat Command's 432nd Wing. Stationed at Creech Air Force Base, Nevada, the unit operates MQ-9 Reaper drones. The unit was first activated on 10 September 2012 and initially contained four reconnaissance squadrons, operating the MQ-1 Predator as well as the MQ-9 Reaper. The group's Detachment 1, operating since at least February 2013, was notable for operating the RQ-170 Sentinel, a stealth unmanned aerial vehicle. In 2015, the detachment was absorbed into the newly activated 44th Reconnaissance Squadron.

== Lineage ==
- Established as 732nd Operations Group on 9 August 2012

Activated on 10 September 2012

=== Assignments ===
- 432nd Wing, 10 September 2012 – present

=== Components ===
- 15th Attack Squadron, 2 July 2018 – present
- 17th Reconnaissance Squadron (later, 17th Attack Squadron), 10 September 2012 – present
- 18th Attack Squadron, 2 July 2018 – present
- 22nd Reconnaissance Squadron (later 22nd Attack Squadron), 10 September 2012 – present
- 30th Reconnaissance Squadron, 10 September 2012 – 5 April 2019
- 44th Reconnaissance Squadron, 1 April 2015 – 5 April 2019
- 732nd Operations Support Squadron, c. 23 January 2019 – present
- 867th Reconnaissance Squadron (later 867th Attack Squadron), 10 September 2012 – present

=== Stations ===
- Creech Air Force Base, Nevada, 10 September 2012 – present

=== Aircraft ===
- MQ-1 Predator (2012–unknown) (Note: The U.S. Air Force has retired the MQ-1 Predator as of 9 March 2018.)
- MQ-9 Reaper (2012–present)
- RQ-170 Sentinel (2015–unknown) (Note: The RQ-170 Sentinel is operated by the 30th and 44th Reconnaissance Squadrons, both of which are no longer part of the 732nd Operations Group as of 2022.)

== Awards ==
Award streamer	Award	Dates	Notes
	Air Force Meritorious Unit Award	1 June 2012-31 May 2013	
	Air Force Meritorious Unit Award	1 June 2017-31 May 2018	
	Air Force Meritorious Unit Award	1 June 2018-31 May 2020	
	Air Force Outstanding Unit Award	1 June 2013-31 May 2014	
