= Attack Squadron =

Attack Squadron may refer to:

- A type of United States Air Force unmanned aerial vehicle squadron – see List of United States Air Force attack squadrons
- A former type of United States Navy aircraft squadron – see List of inactive United States Navy aircraft squadrons
- Jane's Attack Squadron, a World War II flight simulator
- Attack Squadron!, a 1963 Japanese film
