= 18th Attack Squadron =

18th Attack Squadron

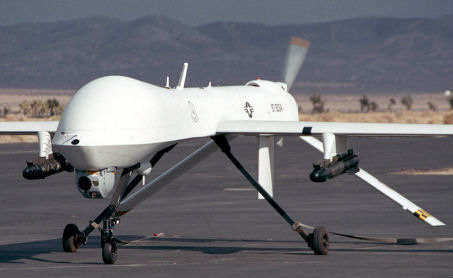
- MQ-1 Predator Unmanned Aerial Vehicle
- Active: 1943–1945; 1946–1979; 2006–2007; 2009–present
- Role: Attack and Surveillance
- Part of: Air Combat Command
- Garrison/HQ: Creech Air Force Base
- Engagements: European Theater of Operations
- Decorations: Air Force Outstanding Unit Award; Belgian Fourragère

Insignia
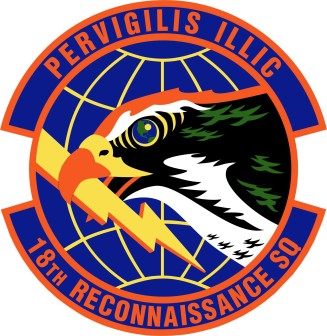
- 18th Reconnaissance Squadron emblem (Note: Approved 9 August 2006.)

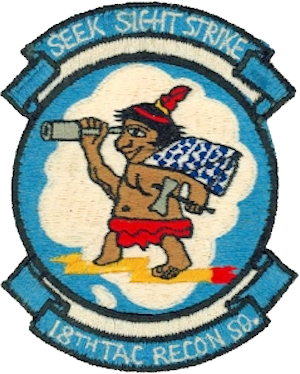
- Patch with 18th Tactical Reconnaissance Emblem (Note: Approved 18 April 1955. Description: On a disc Air Force blue, bordered black, over a cloud formation white, an Indian scout proper, wearing a head band with feather red, around his neck a scarf, checky blue and white, wearing a breech cloth red, carrying in his left hand a tomahawk gray and white, and sighting through a telescope gray held in his right hand, the scout flying through the air astride a lightning flash Air Force yellow and red, in base a small cloud of the third [color mentioned]. All available images of patches depicting the squadron emblem show the Indian standing on the lightning bolt, rather than astride the lightning bolt.)

The 18th Attack Squadron is a squadron of the United States Air Force. It is assigned to the 432d Operations Group, and has been stationed at Creech Air Force Base, Nevada since 2009. The squadron conducts strike, intelligence, surveillance and reconnaissance missions, operating the General Atomics MQ-1 Predator unmanned aerial vehicle.

The squadron was first activated as a fighter unit, the 381st Fighter Squadron, in 1943. After deploying to the European Theater of Operations and engaging in combat for six months, the squadron was converted, along with the other squadrons of the 363d Fighter Group, to a reconnaissance unit as the 161st Tactical Reconnaissance Squadron. It continued in combat until V-E Day, earning a Belgian Fourragère after being twice cited in the Order of the Day of the Belgian Army. The squadron returned to the United States in the fall of 1945 and was inactivated.

The squadron was activated again in 1946 and performed both reconnaissance and training, primarily from Shaw Air Force Base, South Carolina until 1959. It was redesignated the 18th Tactical Reconnaissance Squadron in 1950 because its number, 161, fell in a block reserved for Air National Guard units. It moved to Europe, where it performed reconnaissance for United States Air Forces Europe until 1970, when it returned to Shaw. The squadron was inactivated there in 1979.

== History ==
=== World War II ===
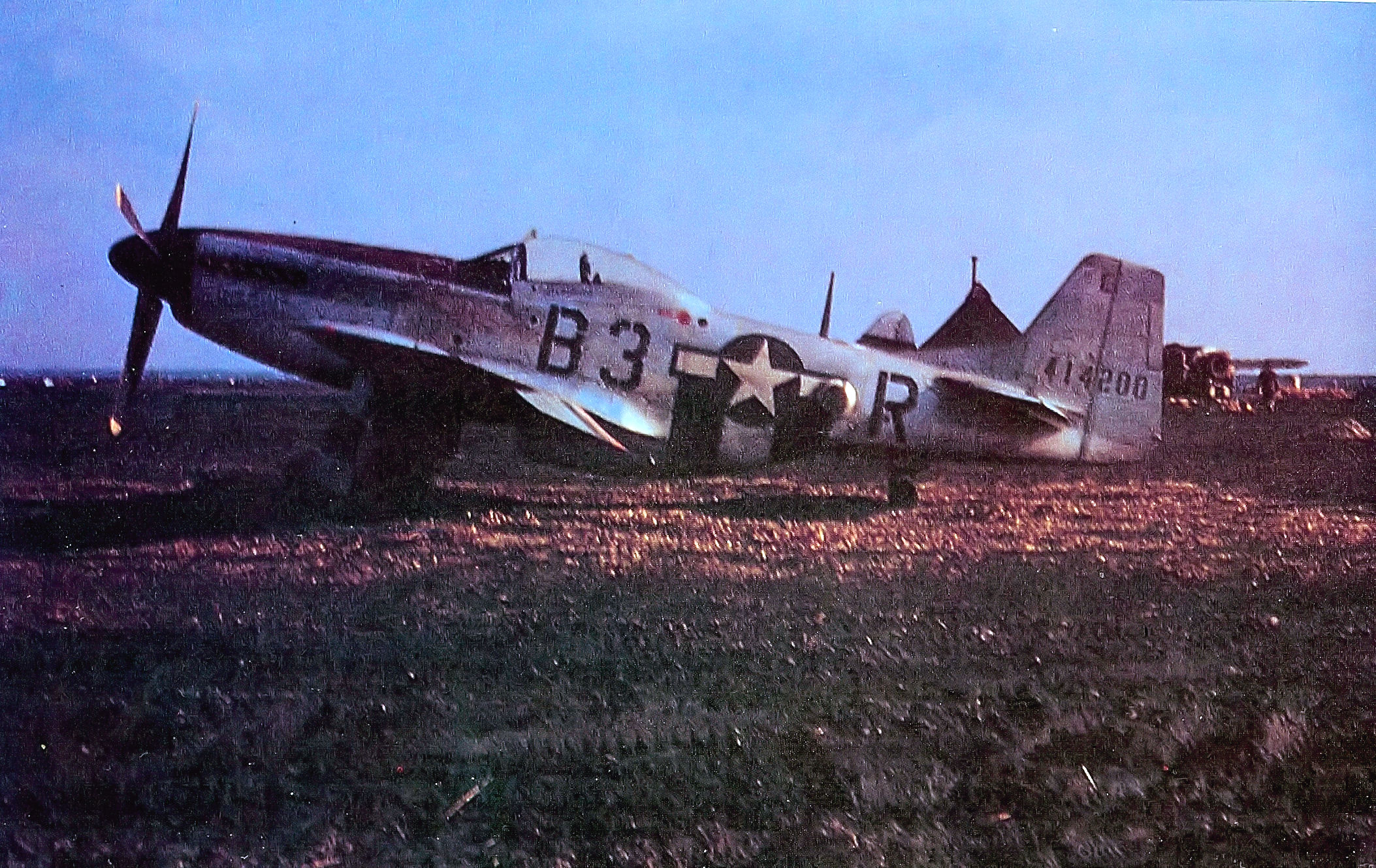
161st Tactical Reconnaissance Squadron P-51D Mustang at Le Culot Airfield (Note: Aircraft is North American F-6D-10-NA Mustang serial 44-14852, taken at Le Culot Airfield (A-89), Belgium, November 1944.)

Activated as part of IV Fighter Command in early 1943 with Bell P-39 Airacobras, the squadron was an air defense unit for the San Francisco area as well as a Replacement Training Unit until the end of 1943. It then retrained on North American P-51 Mustangs and deployed to the European Theater of Operations, where it was assigned to IX Fighter Command in the United Kingdom. It operated both as a tactical fighter squadron, providing air support to Allied ground forces in France as well as an air defense squadron, attacking enemy aircraft over Europe.

In August 1944, the squadron was redesignated as 161st Tactical Reconnaissance Squadron carrying out photographic reconnaissance missions. The unit was inactivated in November 1945.

=== Cold War tactical reconnaissance ===
Activated in 1945 at Brooks Field, Texas under the 363d Reconnaissance Group, it trained with the Lockheed RF-80A Shooting Star. The 18th moved to Langley Field in 1947 when Brooks was transferred to Strategic Air Command. The squadron was reassigned directly to the Fourteenth Air Force in 1949 when the 363d was inactivated and moved to Shaw Air Force Base, South Carolina.

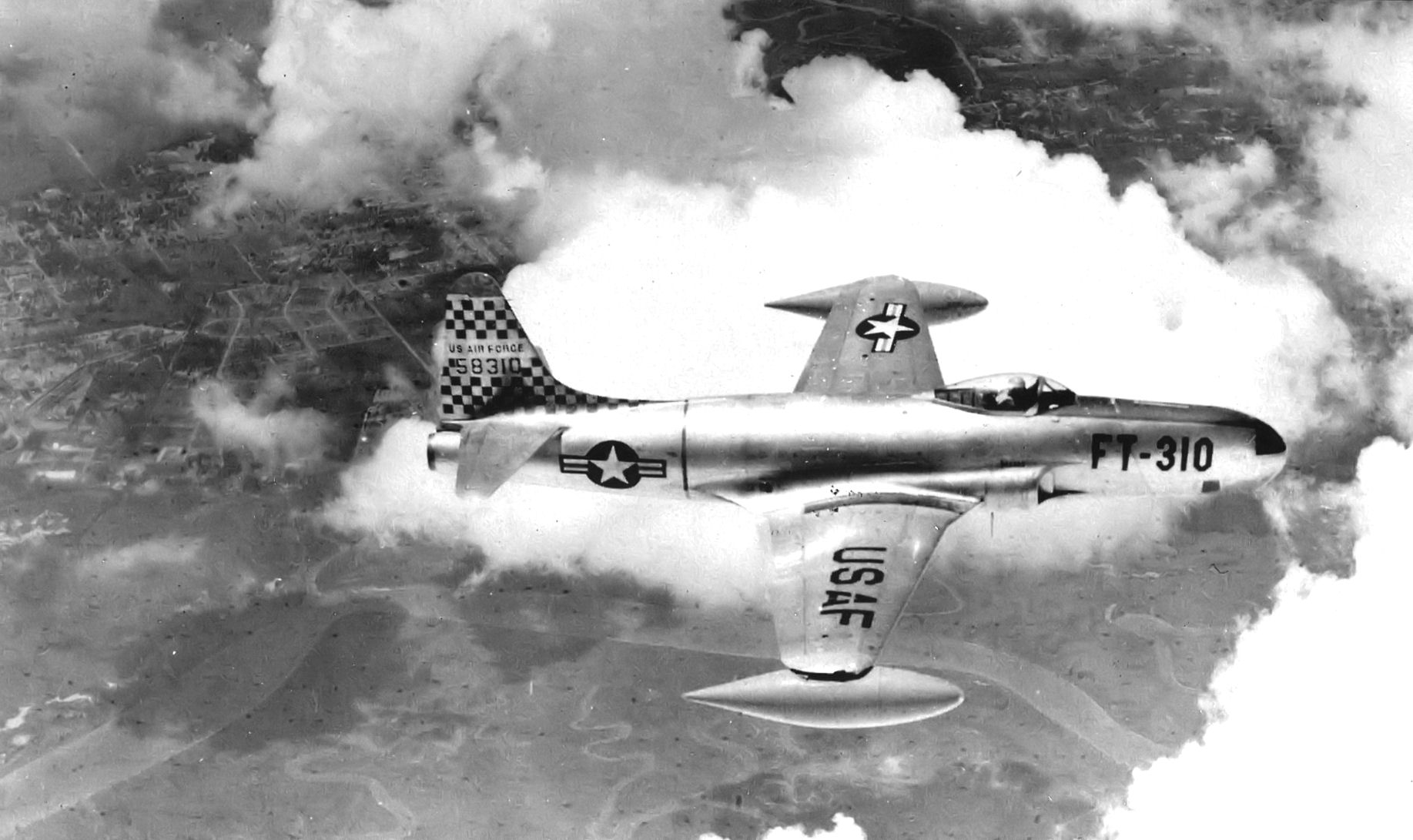
161st Tactical Reconnaissance Squadron RF-80A Shooting Star at Shaw AFB (Note: Aircraft is Lockheed RF-80A-10-LO (built as FP-80-5-LO) Shooting Star serial 45-8310, taken in 1950.)

The unit was reassigned to the 363d when the group was activated at Shaw on 2 April 1951. It became a training squadron with a mission to provide photographic intelligence training to support both air and ground operations by American or Allied ground forces. Upgraded to the Republic RF-84F Thunderflash in 1954, it continued training operations until 1957 when it re-equipped with the McDonnell RF-101C Voodoo.

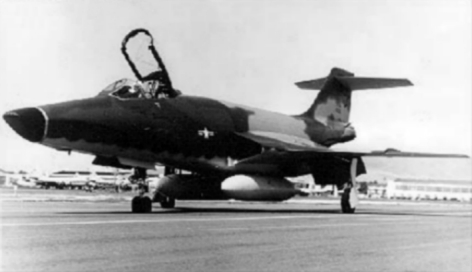
RF-101C Voodoo

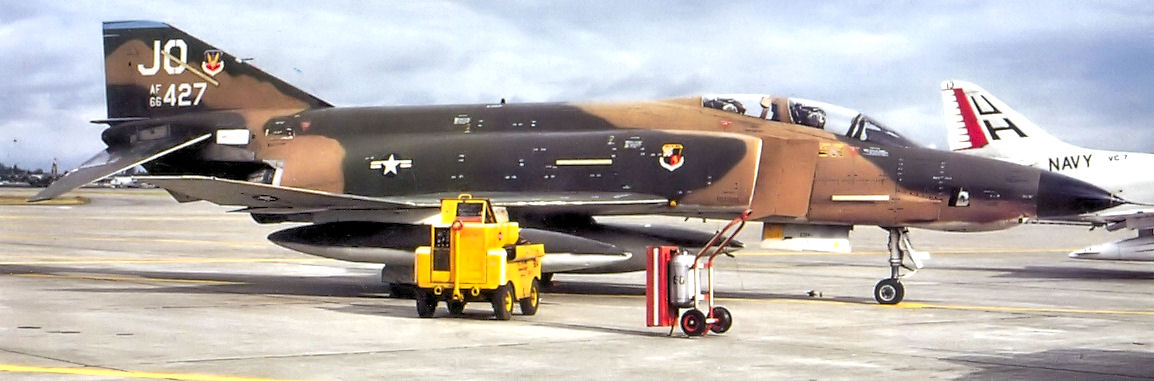
Squadron RF-4C Phantom (Note: Aircraft is McDonnell RF-4C Phantom serial 66-0427 at Shaw AFB, 1977. This plane was sent to the Aerospace Maintenance and Regeneration Center on 5 September 1991 It was converted to a QRF-4C target drone and expended on 8 May 2014. Baugher, Joe (29 April 2023). "1966 USAF Serial Numbers". Joe Baugher. Archived from the original on 15 February 2015.)

The squadron was reassigned to the 66th Tactical Reconnaissance Wing and deployed to NATO in 1959. It operated from France until 1966, moving to RAF Upper Heyford, England. It remained in the UK until 1970, when it returned to Shaw AFB and was assigned to the 363d Tactical Reconnaissance Wing. It was re-equipped with the McDonnell RF-4C Phantom II at Shaw and performed training for new photo-reconnaissance pilots until 1979 when it was inactivated.

=== Unmanned Aerial Vehicle reconnaissance ===
The squadron was activated at Beale Air Force Base, California as the 18th Reconnaissance Squadron, a Northrop Grumman RQ-4 Global Hawk strategic reconnaissance unmanned aerial vehicle squadron between 2006 and 2007. It was activated at Creech Air Force Base, Nevada in 2009 as a General Atomics MQ-1 Predator squadron. In May 2016, the squadron was redesignated as the 18th Attack Squadron.

== Lineage ==
- Constituted as the 381st Fighter Squadron (Single Engine) on 11 February 1943

Activated on 1 March 1943
Redesignated 381st Fighter Squadron, Single Engine on 20 August 1943
Redesignated 161st Tactical Reconnaissance Squadron on 25 August 1944
Inactivated on 9 November 1945

- Redesignated 161st Reconnaissance Squadron, Photo (Jet Propelled) on 9 July 1946

Activated on 31 August 1946
Redesignated 161st Tactical Reconnaissance Squadron, Photo-Jet on 28 August 1948
Redesignated 18th Tactical Reconnaissance Squadron, Photo-Jet on 10 October 1950
Redesignated 18th Tactical Reconnaissance Squadron on 1 October 1966
Inactivated on 30 September 1979

- Redesignated 18th Reconnaissance Squadron on 14 March 2006

Activated on 3 April 2006
Inactivated on 24 August 2007

- Activated on 11 December 2009

Redesignated 18th Attack Squadron on 15 May 2016

=== Assignments ===
- 363d Fighter Group (later 363d Tactical Reconnaissance Group), 1 March 1943 (attached to 10th Photographic Group, 23 December 1944 – 3 January 1945)
- 67th Reconnaissance Group, 3 July–9 November 1945
- 363d Reconnaissance Group (later 363d Tactical Reconnaissance Group), 31 August 1946 (attached to 20th Fighter Wing after 20 September 1949)
- Fourteenth Air Force, 23 September 1949 (attached to 20th Fighter Wing)
- 363d Tactical Reconnaissance Group, 2 April 1951
- 432d Tactical Reconnaissance Wing, 8 February 1958
- 66th Tactical Reconnaissance Wing, 1 June 1959
- 363d Tactical Reconnaissance Wing, 30 January 1970 – 30 September 1979
- 9th Operations Group, 3 April 2006 – 24 August 2007
- 432d Operations Group, 11 December 2009
- 732nd Operations Group, 2 July 2018 – present

=== Stations ===
- Hamilton Field, California, 1 March 1943
- Santa Rosa Army Air Field, California, 23 August 1943
- Sacramento Municipal Airport, California, 8 October – 2 December 1943
- RAF Keevil (AAF-471), England, 23 December 1943
- RAF Rivenhall (AAF-168), England, c. 3 February 1944
- RAF Staplehurst (AAF-413), England, 14 April 1944
- Maupertu Airfield (A-15), France, c. 5 July 1944
- Azeville Airfield (A-7), France, c. 22 August 1944
- Montreuil Airfield (A-38), France, 9 September 1944
- Sandweiler Airfield (A-97), Luxembourg, 11 October 1944
- Le Culot Airfield (A-89), Belgium, 29 October 1944

Operated from Conflans Airfield (A-94), France, 24 December 1944 – 6 February 1945

- Venlo Airfield (Y-55), Netherlands, 11 March 1945
- Gutersloh Airfield (R-85), Germany, 16 April 1945
- Brunswick/Waggum Airfield (R-37), Germany, 26 April 1945
- AAF Station Wiesbaden (Y-80), Germany, 20 May 1945
- Reims/Champagne Airfield (A-62), France, c, 3 Jul – c. 4 September 1945
- Drew Field, Florida 16 September – 9 November 1945
- Brooks Field, Texas, 31 August 1946
- Langley Field (later Langley Air Force Base), Virginia, 1 November 1946
- Shaw Air Force Base, South Carolina, 23 September 1949 – 25 May 1959
- Laon-Couvron Air Base, France, 1 June 1959
- RAF Upper Heyford, England, 1 September 1966
- Shaw Air Force Base, South Carolina, 30 January 1970 – 30 September 1979
- Beale Air Force Base, California, 3 April 2006 – 24 August 2007
- Creech Air Force Base, Nevada, 11 December 2009 – present

=== Aircraft ===
- Bell P-39 Airacobra (1943)
- North American P-51 Mustang (1944–1945)
- North American F-6 Mustang (1944–1945, 1946–1947)
- Lockheed FP-80 (later RF-80) Shooting Star (1946–1955)
- Lockheed T-33 T-Bird (1950–1954)
- Republic RF-84F Thunderflash (1954–1957)
- McDonnell RF-101 Voodoo (1957–1970)
- McDonnell RF-4 Phantom II (1970–1979)
- Northrop Grumman RQ-4 Global Hawk (2006–2007)
- General Atomics MQ-1 Predator (2009 – present)
