= 62nd Expeditionary Attack Squadron =

62d Expeditionary Attack Squadron

- Britain's Prince Edward, right, talks with two Royal Air Force pilots attached to the 62nd Expeditionary Reconnaissance Squadron at Kandahar Airfield
- Active: 1943–1946, 1946-1951, 1971-1989, 2003-present
- Country: United States
- Branch: United States Air Force
- Role: Reconnaissance and Attack
- Part of: Air Combat Command
- Garrison/HQ: Kandahar Airfield
- Engagements: European Theatre of Operations; Korean War; War on terror War in Afghanistan
- Decorations: Distinguished Unit Citation; Air Force Outstanding Unit Award; Republic of Korea Presidential Unit Citation

Insignia
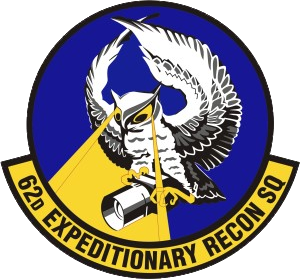
- 62d Expeditionary Reconnaissance Squadron emblem (approved 24 February 1949)

The 62d Expeditionary Attack Squadron is a provisional United States Air Force unit. It is a provisional squadron of Air Combat Command, attached to the 432d Air Expeditionary Operations Group, stationed at Creech Air Force Base, Nevada. The primary mission of the 62d EATKS is to launch and recover all the Air Force Remotely Piloted Aircraft in Afghanistan.

== Mission ==
The unit operates Unmanned Aerial Vehicles over locations in Central Asia as part of the global war on terrorism.

== History ==
=== World War II ===
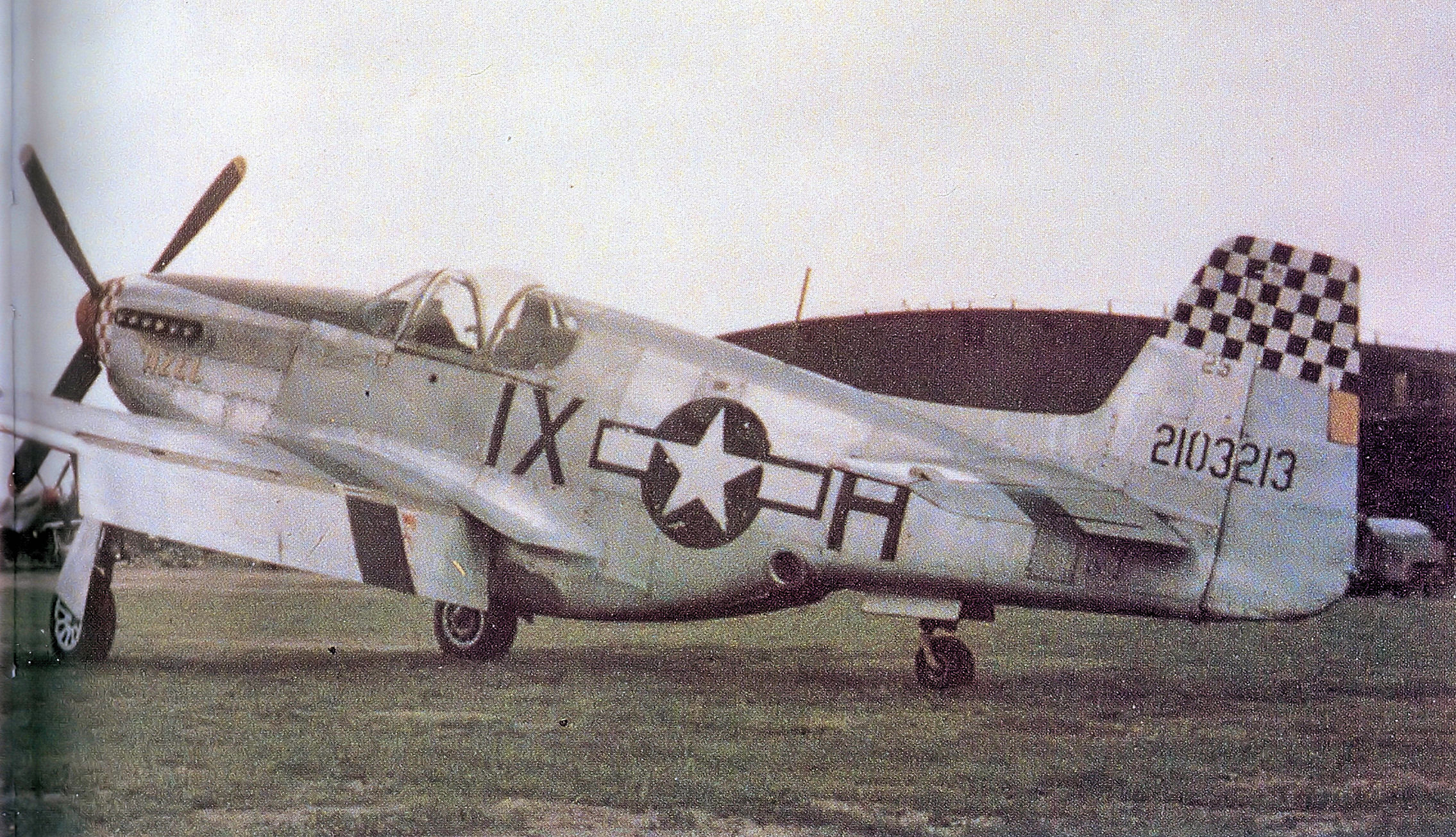
162d Tactical Reconnaissance Squadron P-51C Mustang (Note: Aircraft is North American P-51C-1-NT Mustang serial 42-103213. This aircraft was scrapped in Germany on 15 April 1946.)

Activated as part of IV Fighter Command in early 1943, engaged in Air Defense of the San Francisco area as well as a Replacement Training Unit until the end of 1943. The squadron was trained as a North American P-51 Mustang unit, then dispatched across the Atlantic to join IX Fighter Command in the United Kingdom. It provided air support to Allied ground forces in France and carried out air defence missions, attacking enemy aircraft in air-to-air combat over Europe.

Converted to a tactical reconnaissance squadron in August 1944, engaging in hazardous reconnaissance flights over enemy-controlled territory, gathering intelligence for Allied commanders. Advanced eastward across France using forward combat airfields, then into the Low Countries as well as Occupied Germany until the end of combat in Europe, May 1945.

=== Postwar era ===
Remained in Germany as part of the United States Air Forces in Europe occupation forces, returning to MacDill Field, Florida, in December 1945. Equipped with Douglas FA-26C Invaders for night reconnaissance. The FA-26 (later RB-26) was an A-26 with all guns removed and cameras installed throughout the aircraft.

=== Korean War ===
Due to the pressing needs of Far East Air Forces in Japan the 162d and the photo-processing 363d Reconnaissance Technical Squadron moved from Langley Air Force Base to Itazuke Air Base, Japan on 18 August 1950 for Korean War service and began operations as part of the 543d Tactical Support Group, flying RB-26 Invader night reconnaissance missions. It later moved to a forward base, Taegu Air Base (K-2) in South Korea on 8 Oct 1950, returning to Komaki Air Base, Japan on 26 January 1951. The squadron was inactivated on 25 Feb 1951.

=== Reconnaissance training ===
Reactivated in 1971 as the 62d Tactical Reconnaissance Squadron, being equipped with McDonnell RF-4C Phantom II reconnaissance aircraft. Performed replacement training for reconnaissance pilots, 1971-1982 until its parent 363d Tactical Reconnaissance Wing was re-equipped with General Dynamics F-16 Fighting Falcons and became a tactical fighter squadron. Also operated flight of Martin EB-57E Canberras performing electronic jamming mission with RF-4Cs on simulated combat missions. Retired B-57s in 1976, being the last USAF active-duty squadron to fly the B-57. moved to Bergstrom Air Force Base, Texas along with RF-4Cs and continued replacement pilot training mission until RF-4Cs were retired in 1989, then inactivated.

=== Expeditionary operations ===
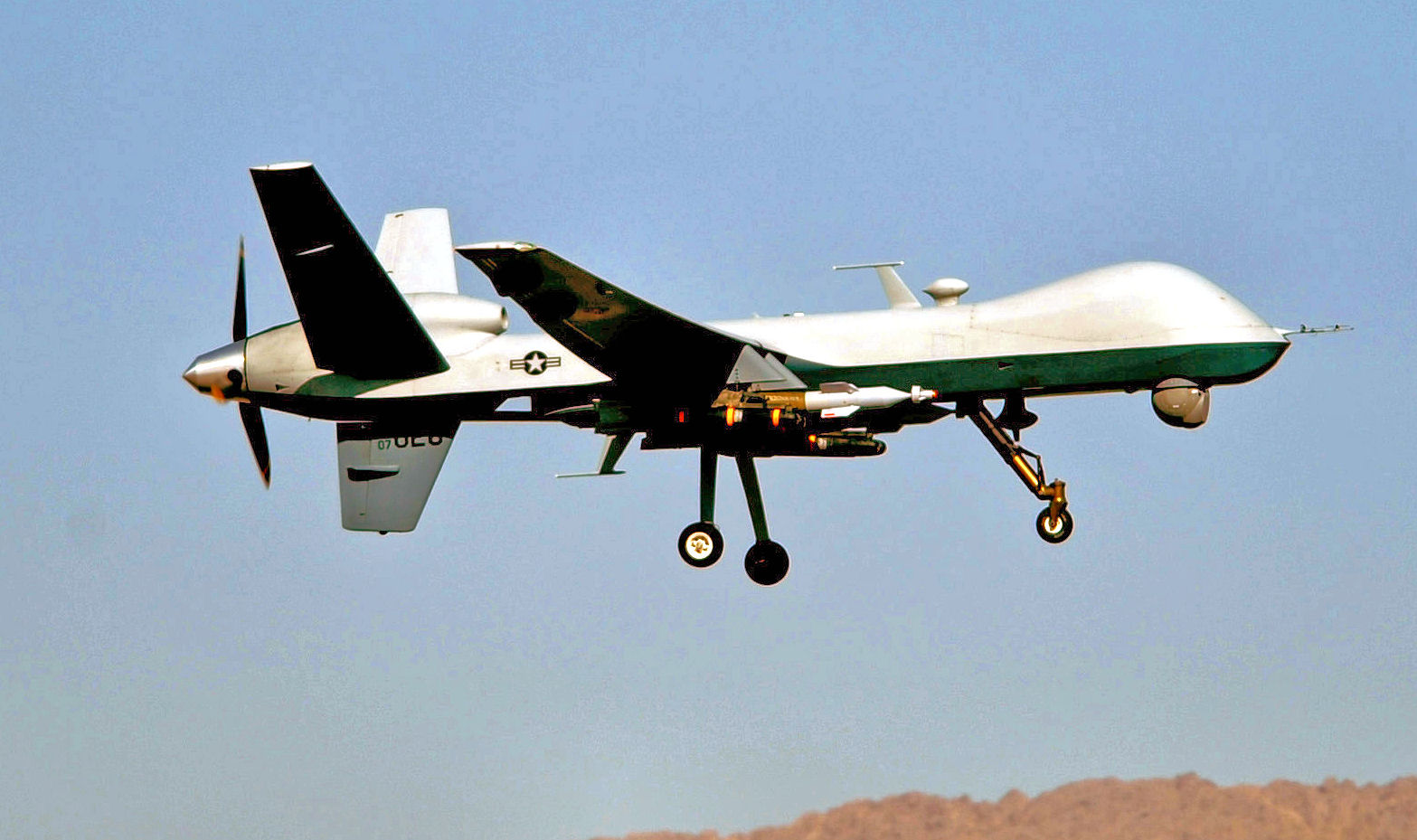
MQ-9 Reaper from the 62nd Expeditionary Reconnaissance Squadron takes off from Kandahar Air Base, Afghanistan, March 13, 2009.

Reactivated in 2003 as provisional expeditionary reconnaissance squadron by Air Combat Command, operating UAVs as part of the global war on terrorism attached to USAFCENT forces in Central Asia.

== Lineage ==
- Constituted as the 382d Fighter Squadron (Single Engine) on 11 February 1943

Activated on 1 March 1943
Redesignated 382d Fighter Squadron, Single Engine on 20 August 1943
Redesignated 162d Tactical Reconnaissance Squadron on 25 August 1944
Inactivated on 3 February 1946

- Redesignated 162d Reconnaissance Squadron, Night Photographic on 9 July 1946

Activated on 29 July 1946
Redesignated 162d Tactical Reconnaissance Squadron, Night Photographic on 14 June 1948
Inactivated on 25 February 1951

- Redesignated 62d Tactical Reconnaissance Squadron on 12 May 1971

Activated on 15 October 1971
Redesignated 62d Tactical Reconnaissance Training Squadron on 1 July 1982
Inactivated on 31 December 1989

- Redesignated 62d Expeditionary Reconnaissance Squadron and converted to provisional status on 26 February 2003
- Redesignated 62d Expeditionary Attack Squadron on 16 September 2016

=== Assignments ===
- 363d Fighter Group (later 363d Tactical Reconnaissance Group), 1 March 1943
- XII Tactical Air Command, 29 September 1944 (attached to Reconnaissance Group (Provisional), XII Tactical Air Command after 16 October 1944)
- Ninth Air Force, 15 Nov 1944 (attached to Reconnaissance Group (Provisional), XII Tactical Air Command)
- XIX Tactical Air Command, 21 April 1945 (attached to 9th Reconnaissance Group (Provisional), 21 April 1945, 10th Photographic Group, 22–25 April 1945)
- 10th Photographic Group (later 10th Reconnaissance Group), 25 April 1945
- United States Strategic Air Forces in Europe, 24 June 1945
- Third Air Force, 3 August-3 February 1946
- 363d Reconnaissance Group (later 363d Tactical Reconnaissance) Group), 29 July 1946 (attached to Fifth Air Force 18 August-26 September 1950, 543d Tactical Support Group after 26 September 1950)
- 543d Tactical Support Group, 10 October 1950 – 25 February 1951
- 363d Tactical Reconnaissance Wing (later 363d Tactical Fighter Wing), 15 October 1971 (attached to 10th Tactical Reconnaissance Wing, 5–24 March 1976, 12–26 July 1978, 24 July-24 August 1979, 20 May-22 June 1982)
- 67th Tactical Reconnaissance Wing, 1 July 1982 – 31 December 1989
- Air Combat Command to activate or inactivate at any time after 26 February 2003

451st Air Expeditionary Wing, 26 February 2003 –1 May 2007
Attached to: 432d Operations Group, 1 May 2007 – present

=== Stations ===
- Hamilton Field, California, 1 March 1943
- Santa Rosa Army Air Field, California, 23 August 1943
- Hayward Army Air Field, California, 4 October-2 December 1943
- RAF Keevil (AAF-471), England, 23 December 1943
- RAF Rivenhall (AAF-168), England, 22 January 1944
- RAF Staplehurst (AAF-413), England, 14 April 1944
- Maupertus Airfield (A-15), France, c. 3 July 1944
- Azeville Airfield (A-7), France, 23 August 1944
- Montreuil Airfield (A-38), France, 13 September 1944
- Dijon-Longvic Airfield (Y-9), France, 24 September 1944
- Nancy-Azelot Airport (A-95), France, 2 November 1944
- Haguenau Airfield (Y-39), France, 31 March 1945
- Wiesbaden Airfield (Y-80), Germany, 21 April 1945
- Furth Airfield (R-28) (later AAF Station Fürth), Germany, 26 April 1945
- Reims-Champagne Airfield (A-62), France, c. 24 June – July 1945
- Drew Field, Florida, 3 August 1945
- MacDill Field, Florida, 21 December 1945 – 3 February 1946
- Brooks Field, Texas, 29 July 1946
- Langley Field (later Langley Air Force Base), Virginia, 20 December 1946 – 28 July 1950
- Itazuke Air Base, Japan, 18 August 1950
- Taegu Air Base, South Korea, 8 October 1950
- Komaki Air Base, Japan, 26 January–25 February 1951
- Shaw Air Force Base, South Carolina, 15 October 1971 (deployed to RAF Alconbury, England, 5–24 March 1976, 24 July-24 August 1979, 20 May-22 June 1982; RAF Coltishall, England, 12–26 June 1978
- Bergstrom Air Force Base, Texas, 1 Jul 1982-31 Dec 1989
- Kandahar Airfield, Afghanistan, 2003-2007
- Creech Air Force Base, Nevada, 1 May 2007 – present

Aircraft operating from Kandahar Airfield, Afghanistan (or other undisclosed locations), 1 May 2007 - present

=== Aircraft ===
- Bell P-39 Airacobra, 1943
- North American P-51 Mustang, 1944–1945
- North American F-6 Mustang, 1944–1945, 1946
- Douglas FA-26 Invader (later RB-26), 1946–1951
- McDonnell RF-4C Phantom II, 1971–1989
- Martin EB-57E Canberra, 1971-1976
- General Atomics MQ-1 Predator, 2005– present
- General Atomics MQ-9 Reaper, ?-Present
