= 432nd Wing =

432nd Wing

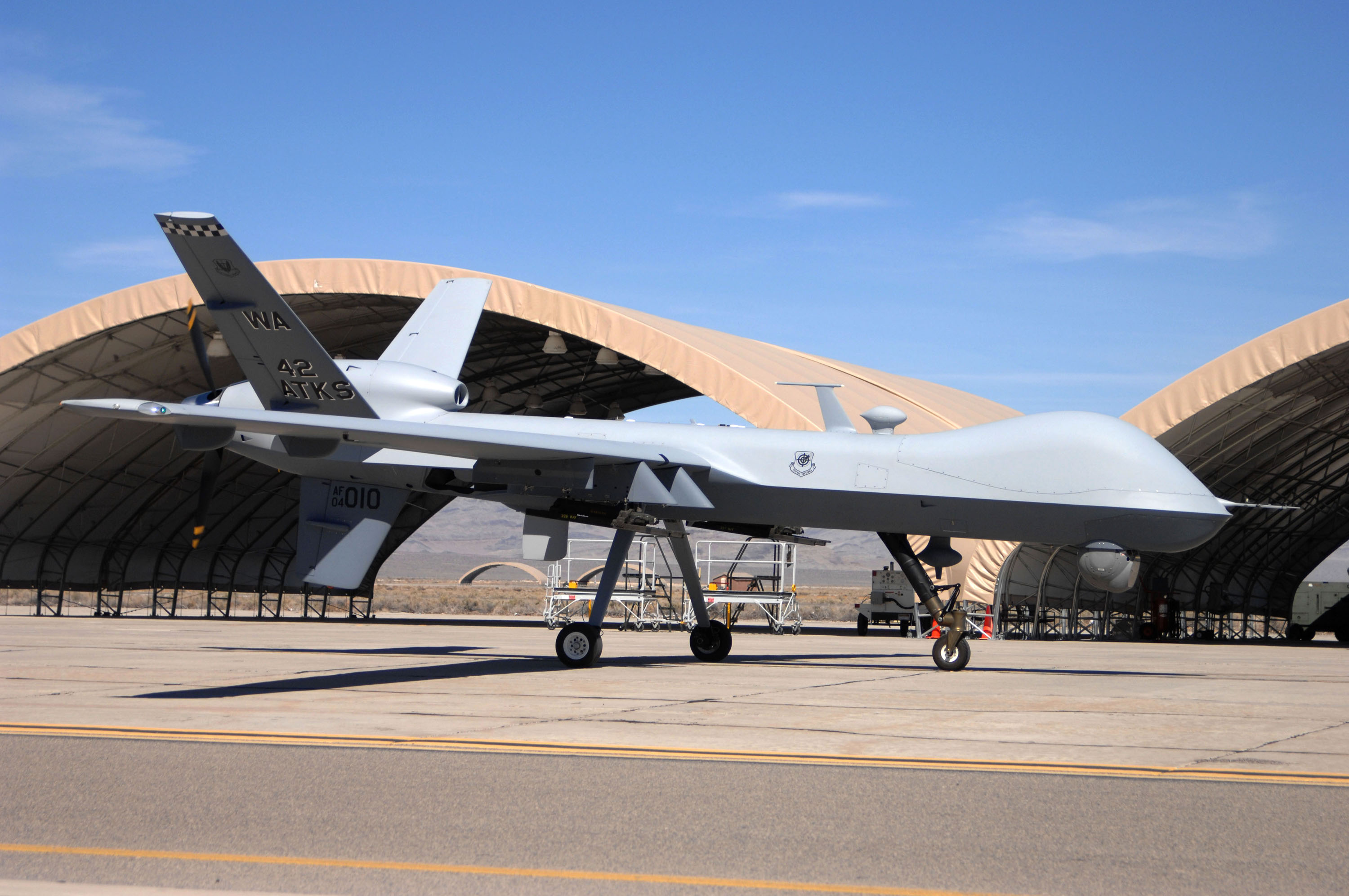
- MQ-9 Reaper at Creech Air Force Base
- Active: 1943–1944; 1954–1958; 1958–1959; 1966–1979; 1984–1994; 2007–present
- Country: United States
- Branch: United States Air Force
- Role: Unmanned Aerial Vehicle reconnaissance and attack
- Part of: Air Combat Command: Fifteenth Air Force
- Garrison/HQ: Creech Air Force Base, Nevada
- Nickname: Hunters
- Motto: Victoria per Scientam (Latin for 'Victory Through Knowledge')
- Engagements: Vietnam War

- Decorations: Presidential Unit Citation Air Force Meritorious Unit Award Air Force Outstanding Unit Award with Combat "V" Device; Air Force Outstanding Unit Award Vietnamese Gallantry Cross with Palm

Commanders
- Notable commanders: John G. Lorber; Michael E. Ryan

Insignia
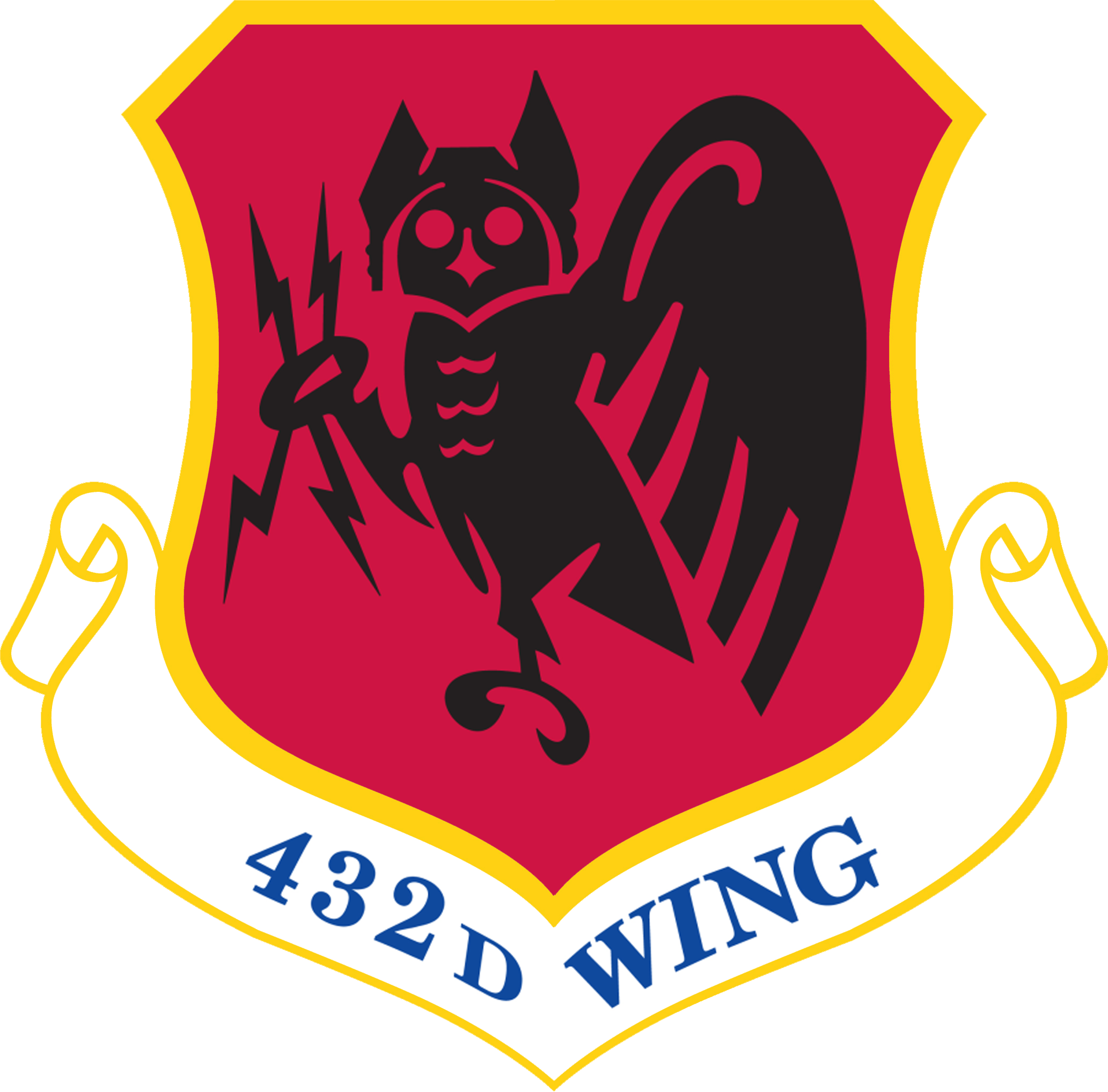
- 432nd Wing emblem (Note: Approved 2 June 1955. The emblem was separately approved for the wing on 4 August 1958 before the group and wing were consolidated.)

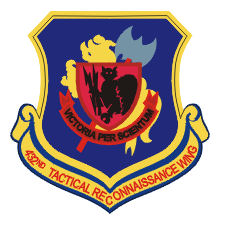
- 432nd Tactical Reconnaissance Group emblem as originally approved

The 432nd Wing is a unit of the United States Air Force assigned to Air Combat Command at Creech Air Force Base, near Indian Springs, Nevada. It operates General Atomics MQ-9 Reaper and RQ-170 Sentinel unmanned aerial vehicles.

The wing operates unmanned aircraft providing real-time reconnaissance, surveillance, and precision attack against fixed and time-critical targets. The 432nd Air Expeditionary Wing is a provisional unit assigned to Air Combat Command for components of the 432nd Wing when deployed into combat areas. The Wing was active during the Vietnam War, as well as in Iraq and Afghanistan.

== Mission ==
The 432nd Wing was the first United States Air Force wing dedicated to unmanned aircraft systems, specifically the General Atomics MQ-9 Reaper and Lockheed Martin RQ-170 Sentinel. The wing was reactivated 1 May 2007 at Creech Air Force Base, Nevada. It has dual reporting responsibilities to Ninth Air Force and U.S. Air Forces Central Command (USAFCENT) (as the 432nd AEW) at Shaw Air Force Base, South Carolina, as well as to Twelfth Air Force and U.S. Air Forces Southern Command at Davis–Monthan Air Force Base, Arizona.

The wing has flown intelligence, surveillance, and reconnaissance missions in Operation Enduring Freedom and for the War in Iraq, flown by pilots and sensor operators in the United States.

The 432nd is authorized 160 Predators and 60 Reapers. As of May 2007, 6 Reapers and about 85 Predators have been delivered, with half of the Predators deployed forward in the United States Central Command area of operations. In 2007, the wing was expected to fly 12 combat air missions in Iraq and Afghanistan each day.

== Units ==
As of 2022 the wing is made up of the following units:

- 432nd Operations Group

11th Attack Squadron - MQ-9 Reaper
30th Reconnaissance Squadron - RQ-170 Sentinel
44th Reconnaissance Squadron - RQ-170 Sentinel
432nd Operations Support Squadron
489th Attack Squadron - MQ-9 Reaper

- 732nd Operations Group - multicomponent including ANG and AFRES

15th Attack Squadron - MQ-9 Reaper
17th Attack Squadron - MQ-9 Reaper
22nd Attack Squadron - MQ-9 Reaper
732nd Operations Support Squadron
867th Attack Squadron - MQ-9 Reaper

- 432nd Maintenance Group

432nd Aircraft Maintenance Squadron
432nd Aircraft Communications Maintenance Squadron
432nd Maintenance Squadron

With the raising of the 25th Attack Group to wing status in 2025-26, the 20th Attack Squadron; 42nd; 50th, 89th, and 482nd Attack Squadrons appear to have been transferred to the new 25th Attack Wing.

== History ==
=== World War II ===
The 432nd Observation Group was activated on 22 February 1943. It served as the operational training unit (OTU) of the USAAF School of Applied Tactics at Keystone Army Air Field, Florida. The group trained and provided reconnaissance to assist fighter, bombardment, and ground units with their training. Aircraft included Bell P-39 Airacobra fighter and Aeronca L-3 Grasshopper light observation aircraft. The group was disbanded on 1 November 1943.

=== Tactical Air Command ===
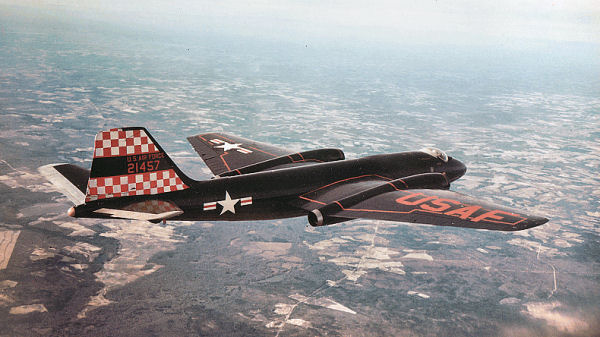
B-57A Canberra of the 43rd Tactical Reconnaissance Squadron. (Note: Aircraft is Martin RB-57A-MA, serial 52-1457. This aircraft is currently on static display at the Museum of Aviation (Warner Robins).)

On 23 March 1953, the 432nd Tactical Reconnaissance Group was activated at Shaw Air Force Base, South Carolina. The new group's mission was to assume the reconnaissance training mission previously carried out by the 363rd Tactical Reconnaissance Wing.

The group initially conducted training with two squadrons (20th, 29th) flying the Republic RF-84F Thunderflash and two squadrons (41st, 43rd) flying the Martin RB-57A Canberra. In 1957, the group upgraded the 20th and 29th to the McDonnell RF-101C Voodoo, and the 41st and 43rd transitioned to the electronic warfare Douglas EB-66 Destroyer.

When elevated to the 432nd Tactical Reconnaissance Wing on 8 February 1958, the wing operated the USAF Advanced Flying Training School, Tactical Reconnaissance. With the elevation to wing status, the 432nd TFW was realigned to a four squadron RF-101C wing (17th, 18th, 20th, 29th Tactical Reconnaissance Squadrons). From 8 February 1958 to 18 June 1959 the wing was supervised by the 837th Air Division.

To reduce costs, the 432nd TRW was inactivated on 8 April 1959. The RF-101C equipped 17th and 18th Tactical Reconnaissance Squadrons were deployed to NATO, being reassigned to the 66th Tactical Reconnaissance Wing at Laon-Couvron Air Base, France and the 20th and 29th TRSs continued their training missions under the 363rd TRW.

=== Vietnam War ===
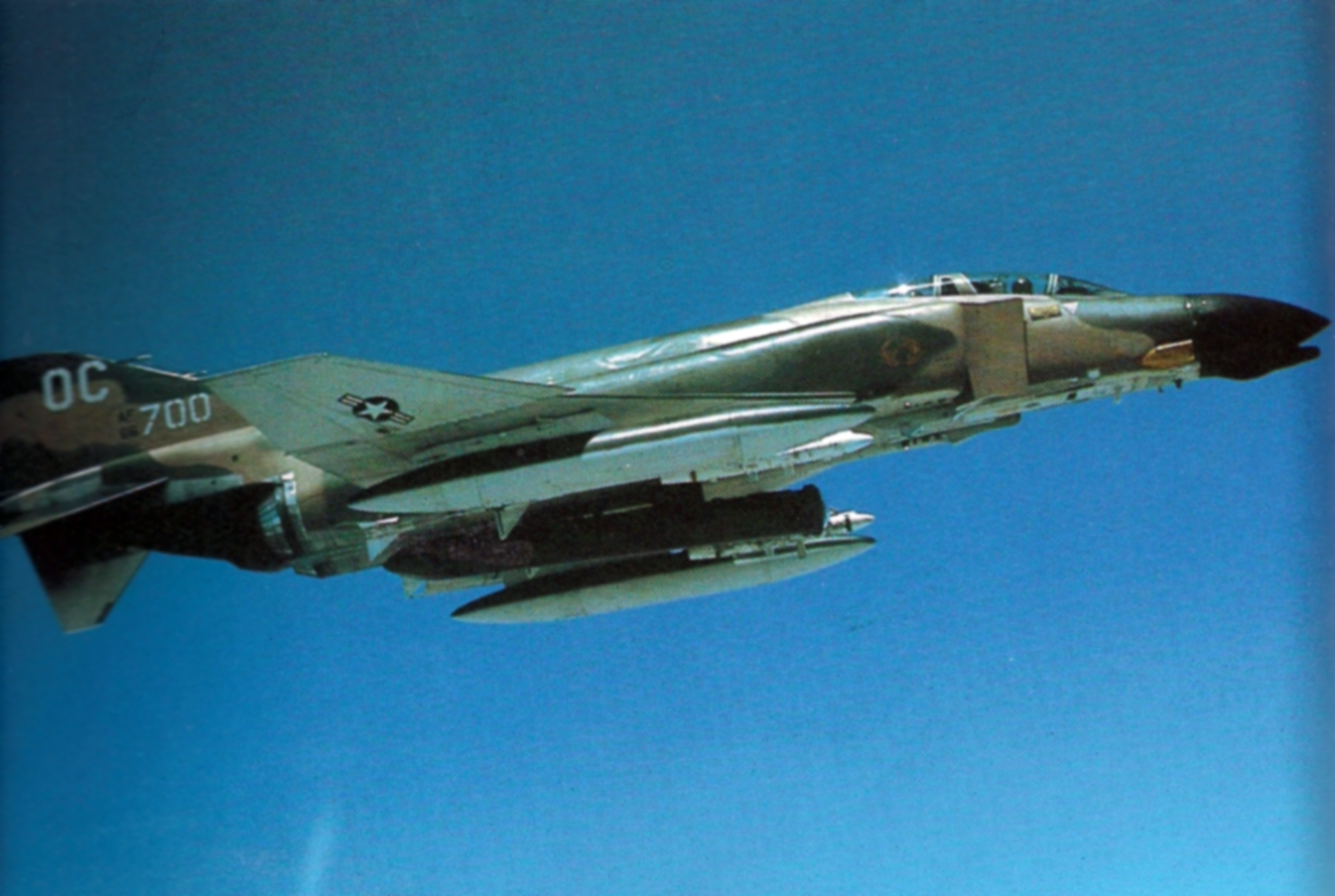
A 13th TFS F-4D carrying a Pave Sword laser pod, in 1971.

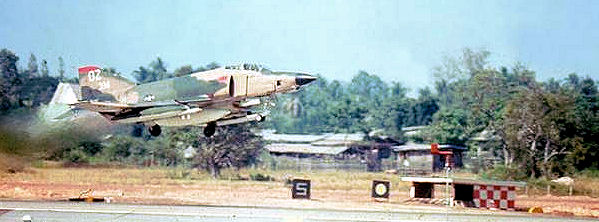
RF-4C of the 14th Tactical Reconnaissance Squadron

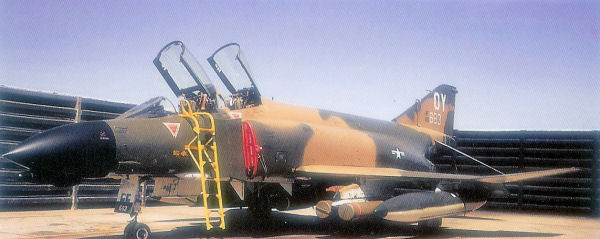
F-4D Phantom of the 555th Tactical Fighter Squadron taken on 20 January 1972 (Note: Aircraft is McDonnell F-4D-28-MC Phantom II, serial 65-0683. This aircraft was retired to AMARC on 6 May 1988 and scrapped on 2 January 1997.)

On 18 September 1966, the 432nd Tactical Reconnaissance Wing was activated at Udorn Royal Thai Air Force Base, Thailand as a RF-4C Phantom II wing. The wing assumed the personnel, aircraft and equipment of the 6234th Tactical Fighter Wing, which was simultaneously discontinued. At Udon, it became one of the most diversified units of its size in the Air Force.

The mission of the wing was to provide intelligence information about hostile forces through tactical reconnaissance and use its fighter elements to destroy the targets earmarked by the intelligence data provided. The wing had numerous missions in the support area. The 432nd TRW accounted for more than 80 percent of all reconnaissance activity over North Vietnam.

In addition to the reconnaissance mission, the 432nd also had a tactical fighter squadron component, with two (13th Tactical Fighter Squadron, 555th Tactical Fighter Squadron) F-4C/D squadrons assigned. The squadrons flew strike missions over North Vietnam and the pilots and weapon systems officers of the 13 TFS and 555 TFS were credited with MiG kills.

In 1968, the 7th Airborne Command and Control Squadron, flying specialized Lockheed C-130 Hercules aircraft, became part of the 432nd. The squadron had been attached to the wing as a temporary duty unit from Da Nang Air Base, South Vietnam. Another unit assigned was the 4th Special Operations Squadron, flying various (Douglas AC-47 Spooky and Fairchild AC-119 Stinger) gunships that supported ground units.

On 19 March 1969, the wing proposed a new forward air control program to 7th Air Force. Calling for photo reconnaissance in conjunction with Fast FACs, it offered the advantage of speedier, fresher intelligence from aerial photo interpretation. The mission was approved, and the Wing's volunteers were trained by "Misty" and "Stormy" FACs. The first combined FAC/photo mission was flown on 26 April 1969. The Fast FAC used the call sign "Falcon"; the photo recce plane used "Atlanta". The call signs "Laredo" and "Whiplash" were also sometimes used. By July, they were asked to augment the efforts of the "Tiger" FACs in the Operation Barrel Roll area of Laos. While supporting Operation About Face, they improvised mass bombings by 16 to 20 fighter-bombers three times in September 1969. One of these mass raids inflicted heavy casualties on a concentration of about 1,000 communist troops. In November, they discovered 102 new targets; the following month, they found 172 more. To do this, they pressed lower than 4,000 feet altitude. In the last quarter of 1969, 21 of their aircraft suffered battle damage. They were then ordered to remain above 4,500 feet altitude to escape ground fire. Regardless of their operating altitude, their bomb damage assessment record was triple the average for 7th Air Force units.

In the fall of 1970 the wing was phased down as part of the overall U.S. withdrawal from the Vietnam War; however, in 1972 tactical fighter strength was augmented by deployed Tactical Air Command CONUS( Continental US)-based tactical fighter squadrons being attached to the 432nd in response to the North Vietnamese invasion of South Vietnam. In addition, the 421st Tactical Fighter Squadron was reassigned from Takhli Royal Thai Air Force Base. During Operation Linebacker, between May and October 1972, the 432nd TRW had seven F-4 tactical fighter squadrons assigned or attached, (13th, 56th, 308th, 414th, 421st, 523rd and 555th) making it the largest wing in the USAF. The three Vietnam era Airforce Aces all came from the 432nd – two from the 555th and one from the 13th. The CONUS-based squadrons returned to the United States in the fall of 1972.

As a result of the Paris Peace Accords of 1973, the numbers of USAF personnel and aircraft at Udorn were reduced. The 421st TFS was inactivated in August, and the 555th moved to Luke Air Force Base in 1974. By the spring of 1975, two operational squadrons remained, the 14th Tactical Reconnaissance Squadron (RF-4C) and the 13th TFS (F-4D/E).

Forces from the 432nd participated in the SS Mayaguez action in May 1975, sinking two Cambodian Khmer Rouge ships. By 1975, the political climate between Washington and Bangkok had become sour and the Royal Thai Government wanted the USAF out of Thailand by the end of the year. Palace Lightning was the plan under which the USAF would withdraw its aircraft and personnel from Thailand.

The 432nd TFW was inactivated on 23 December 1975. The 13th TFSs F-4E aircraft and some support personnel were reassigned to the 3rd TFW at Clark AB, Philippines and the F-4D aircraft and support personnel to the 18th TFW at Kadena Air Base, Okinawa. The 14th TRS was inactivated and the RF-4Cs were sent to Shaw Air Force Base, South Carolina. The last USAF personnel departed Udorn Royal Thai Airforce base on 8 January 1976.

=== Tactical Drone Group ===
The 432nd was reactivated at Davis–Monthan AFB, Arizona on 1 July 1976 as the 432nd Tactical Drone Group. The 432nd performed photographic reconnaissance to support tactical air and surface forces with tactical drones. They used AQM-34L/M/V drones, DC-130 launch vehicles, and CH-3 recovery helicopters. The group conducted follow-on testing and evaluation of the AQM-34V model drone and the initial operational testing and evaluation and developmental testing and evaluation of the DC-130H "mother ship." The 432nd also supported testing and evaluation of the BQM-34C drone at Hill AFB, Utah.

The group was inactivated in April 1979.

=== Pacific Air Forces ===
In July 1984, the 432nd was again reactivated as the 432nd Tactical Fighter Wing at Misawa Air Base, Japan. The 432nd controlled two General Dynamics F-16 Fighting Falcon squadrons (13th Fighter Squadron, 14th Fighter Squadron) and the 39th Rescue Squadron, flying the HH-60 Pave Hawk helicopter.

The 432nd was replaced by the 35th Fighter Wing on 1 October 1994 at Misawa and again became inactive.

=== Air Combat Command ===
The wing was reactivated at Creech Air Force Base, Nevada, on 1 May 2007 as the Air Force's first unmanned aircraft systems wing. It was renamed the 432nd Air Expeditionary Wing in May 2008.

In support of relief for the victims of the 2010 Haiti earthquake, on 27 January 2010 the wing began flying two RQ-1 Predator orbits over Port-au-Prince with six Predators from a training unit flying out of Rafael Hernández Airport, a civilian airport in Puerto Rico, by a detachment of about 50 wing members.

An additional operations group for the wing, the 732nd Operations Group, was constituted on 9 August 2012, and subsequently activated on 10 September 2012. It initially included three reconnaissance squadrons, the 17th, 22nd, and 30th, two of which later became attack squadrons.

== Lineage ==
432nd Tactical Reconnaissance Group

- Established as the 432nd Observation Group on 18 February 1943

Activated on 22 February 1943
Redesignated: 432nd Reconnaissance Group on 2 April 1943
Redesignated: 432nd Tactical Reconnaissance Group on 11 August 1943
Disestablished on 1 November 1943

- Reestablished on 14 January 1954

Activated on 18 March 1954
Inactivated on 8 February 1958

- Consolidated with the 432nd Tactical Reconnaissance Wing on 31 January 1984

432nd Wing

- Established as the 432nd Tactical Reconnaissance Wing on 23 March 1953

Activated on 8 February 1958
Inactivated on 18 June 1959

- Activated on 19 August 1966 (not organized)

Organized on 18 September 1966
Redesignated 432nd Tactical Fighter Wing on 15 November 1974
Inactivated on 23 December 1975

- Redesignated 432nd Tactical Drone Group on 24 May 1976

Activated on 1 July 1976
Inactivated on 1 April 1979

- Consolidated with the 432nd Tactical Reconnaissance Group on 31 January 1984
- Redesignated 432nd Tactical Fighter Wing on 5 June 1984

Activated on 1 July 1984
Redesignated 432nd Fighter Wing on 31 May 1991
Inactivated on 1 October 1994

- Redesignated 432nd Air Expeditionary Group and converted to provisional status on 16 January 2002
- Returned to permanent status and redesignated 432nd Fighter Wing on 16 February 2007
- Redesignated 432nd Wing and activated on 1 May 2007

=== Assignments ===
- Air Support Department, Army Air Forces School of Applied Tactics, 22 February – 1 November 1943
- Ninth Air Force, 18 March 1954 (attached to: 363rd Tactical Reconnaissance Wing until 30 October 1955 and after 10 December 1955, attached to: 6 Air Army (Sagebrush), 31 October – 10 December 1955)
- 837th Air Division, 8 February 1958 – 18 June 1959
- Pacific Air Forces, 19 August 1966 (not organized)
- Thirteenth Air Force, 18 September 1966 (attached to Seventh Air Force until c. 15 August 1973, United States Support Activities Group/Seventh Air Force until 30 June 1975)
- 17th Air Division, 1 July – 23 December 1975
- Twelfth Air Force, 1 July 1976
- Tactical Training, Davis–Monthan, 1 August 1978 – 1 April 1979
- Fifth Air Force, 1 July 1984 – 1 October 1994
- Pacific Air Forces to activate or inactivate at any time after 16 January 2002
- Twelfth Air Force, 1 May 2007 – 20 August 2020
- Fifteenth Air Force, 20 August 2020 – present

=== Components ===
- Group
  - 25th Attack Group: 27 February 2018 – present
  - 432nd Operations Group: 31 May 1991 – 1 October 1994. 1 May 2007 – present
  - 732nd Operations Group: 10 September 2012 – present
  - 4411th Combat Crew Training Group: attached 8 April – 17 May 1959
- Squadron
  - 3rd Observation (later, 3rd Tactical Reconnaissance) Squadron: attached 27 March – 1 November 1943
  - 4th Tactical Fighter Squadron: attached 29–30 October 1972, assigned 31 October 1972 – 23 December 1975 (not operational, 7–23 December 1975)
  - 7th Airborne Command and Control Squadron: 31 October 1968 – 30 April 1972 (detached entire period)
  - 11th Tactical Reconnaissance, Photographic-Jet (later, 11th Tactical Reconnaissance; 11th Tactical Drone) Squadron: 25 October 1966 – 10 November 1970; 1 July 1976 – 1 April 1979
  - 13th Tactical Fighter Squadron: attached 21 October – 14 November 1967; assigned 15 November 1967 – 30 June 1975; 1 June 1985 – 31 May 1991
  - 14th Tactical Reconnaissance (later, 14th Tactical Fighter) Squadron: attached 28 October – 5 November 1967, assigned 6 November 1967 – 30 June 1975; 1 January 1987 – 31 May 1991
  - 17th Tactical Reconnaissance Squadron, Photographic-Jet: attached 8 January – 7 February 1958, assigned 8 February 1958 – 10 May 1959 (detached 6 September – 9 December 1958)
  - 18th Tactical Reconnaissance Squadron, Photographic-Jet: attached 8 January – 7 February 1958, assigned 8 February 1958 – 1 June 1959.
  - 20th Tactical Reconnaissance Squadron, Photographic-Jet (later, 20th Tactical Reconnaissance): 18 March 1954 – 18 May 1959 (detached 8 April – 17 May 1959); 18 September 1966 – 1 November 1967
  - 22nd Tactical Drone Squadron: 1 July 1976 – 1 April 1979
  - 25th Tactical Fighter Squadron: 5 July 1974 – 18 December 1975
  - 29th Tactical Reconnaissance Squadron, Photographic-Jet: 18 March 1954 – 18 May 1959 (detached 8 April – 17 May 1959)
  - 41st Tactical Reconnaissance Squadron, Night Photographic (later, 41st Tactical Reconnaissance, Photographic-Jet; 41st Tactical Reconnaissance; 41st Tactical Electronic Warfare) Squadron: 18 March 1954 – 8 February 1958 (detached 20 October-c. 6 December 1955 and 8 January – 8 February 1958); 18 September 1966 – 15 August 1967 (detached 8–15 August 1967)
  - 43rd Tactical Reconnaissance, Night Photographic (later, 43rd Tactical Reconnaissance, Night Photographic-Jet) Squadron: 18 March 1954 – 8 February 1958 (detached 8 January – 8 February 1958); attached c. 1 February – 7 April 1959
  - 58th Tactical Fighter Squadron: attached 9 May – 14 October 1972
  - 307th Tactical Fighter Squadron: attached c. 29 July – 28 October 1972
  - 308th Tactical Fighter Squadron: attached c. 9 May-c. 29 July 1972
  - 421st Tactical Fighter Squadron: 31 October 1972 – 23 December 1975 (detached 14–23 December 1975)
  - 523rd Tactical Fighter Squadron: attached 9 April – 25 October 1972
  - 555th Tactical Fighter Squadron: attached 28–31 May 1968; assigned 1 June 1968 – 5 July 1974
  - 6460th Tactical Reconnaissance (later, 6460th Tactical Electronic Warfare) Squadron; 18 September 1966 – 15 August 1967 (detached 8–15 August 1967)
  - 6461st Tactical Reconnaissance Squadron, Photographic-Jet: 18 September – 8 November 1966 (not operational, 25 October-8 Nov 1966)

=== Stations ===
- Alachua Army Air Field, Florida, 22 February 1943
- Keystone Army Air Field, Florida, March-1 November 1943
- Shaw Air Force Base, South Carolina, 18 March 1954 – 18 June 1959
- Udorn Royal Thai Air Force Base, Thailand, 18 September 1966 – 23 December 1975
- Davis–Monthan Air Force Base, Arizona, 1 July 1976 – 1 April 1979
- Misawa Air Base, Japan, 1 July 1984 – 1 October 1994
- Creech Air Force Base, Nevada, 1 May 2007 – present

=== Aircraft ===
- Douglas A-20 Havoc, 1943
- Douglas DB-7, 1943
- Bell P-39 Airacobra, 1943
- Aeronca L-3 Grasshopper
- Douglas RB-26 Invader, 1954–1956
- Martin RB-57A Canberra, 1954–1956
- Lockheed RF-80A Shooting Star, 1954–1955
- Republic RF-84F Thunderflash, 1955–1958
- Douglas RB-66C Destroyer, 1956–1959
- McDonnell RF-101C Voodoo, 1957–1959; 1966–1967
- EB-66C Destroyer, 1966–1967
- McDonnell F-4 Phantom II, 1966–1975
- McDonnell RF-4C Phantom II, 1966–1975
- Douglas RC-47, 1966–1969
- Douglas AC-47 Spooky, 1969–1970
- BQM-34 (drone), 1976–1979
- Lockheed DC-130 Hercules, 1976–1979
- RC-130 Hercules, 1976–1978
- General Dynamics F-16 Fighting Falcon, 1985–1994
- General Atomics MQ-1 Predator, 2007–2018
- General Atomics MQ-9 Reaper, 2007–present
- Lockheed Martin RQ-170 Sentinel, 2012–present
