= 867th Attack Squadron =

867th Attack Squadron

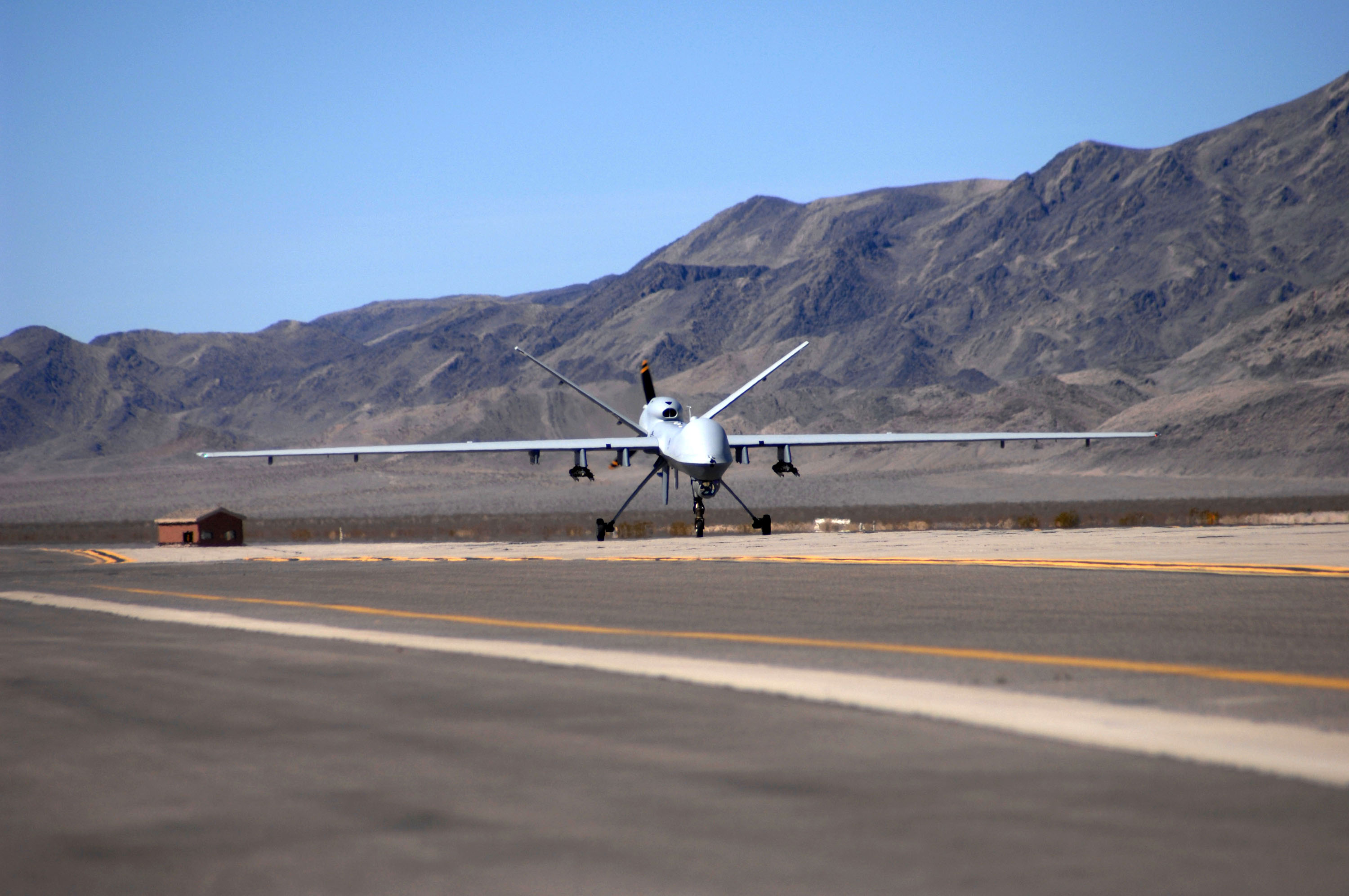
- MQ-9 Reaper at Creech AFB
- Active: 1917–1918; 1940-1946; 2012-present
- Country: United States
- Branch: United States Air Force
- Role: Attack and reconnaissance
- Part of: Air Combat Command
- Garrison/HQ: Creech Air Force Base, Nevada
- Nickname: Spartans
- Motto: Fear the Thunder
- Mascot: Spartan
- Engagements: American Theater of World War II; Pacific Theater of Operations
- Decorations: Philippine Republic Presidential Unit Citation

Insignia
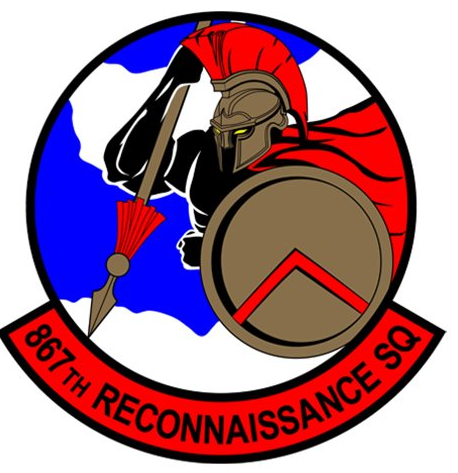
- 867th Attack Squadron emblem

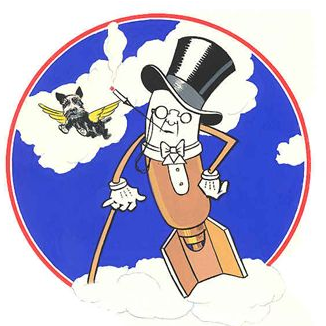
- 867th Bombardment Squadron Emblem (Note: Approved on 17 May 1945. Description: On an ultramarine blue disc, border equally divided red and white, a caricatured, light brown aerial bomb standing on fins on cloud formation in base, and wearing a black top hat, pince-nez glasses, white gloves and formal shirt front and tie, while leaning nonchalantly on a brown cane held in right hand, and resting hand with elbow bent on left hip, and smoking a cigarette held in a long, black holder, all in front of a large white cloud formation and a small, black, caricatured "Scotty" dog, winged gold in flight toward dexter chief.)

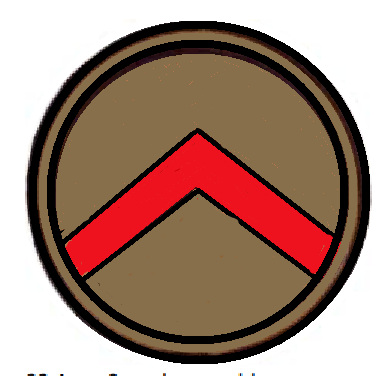
- 92 Aero Sq emblem

Aircraft flown
- MQ-9 Reaper

The 867th Attack Squadron is an active United States Air Force unit. It was reactivated at Creech Air Force Base, Nevada, on September 10, 2012 as a remotely piloted aircraft squadron.

The squadron was first active during World War I as the 92d Aero Squadron. It deployed to England in October 1917 and conducted training with the Royal Air Force, but saw no combat. It returned to the United States at the end of 1918 and was demobilized.

Activated as the 17th Reconnaissance Squadron several months before the American entry into World War II, the squadron performed in the antisubmarine campaign, while changing its designation every few months. When the United States Navy assumed full responsibility for the antisubmarine campaign in 1943, it became the 867th Bombardment Squadron and provided the cadre for a new Consolidated B-24 Liberator group. The squadron moved to the Pacific and entered combat against Japan, serving to the end of the war.

== History ==
=== World War I ===
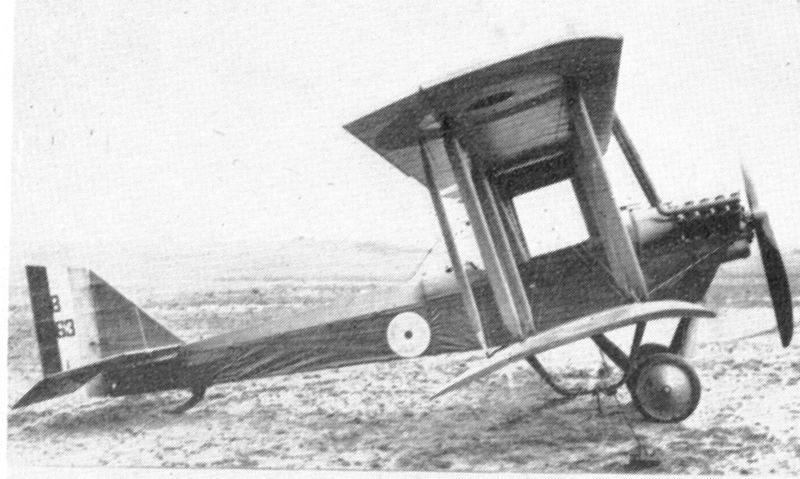
Airco DH.6

The squadron was first established in the summer of 1917 as the 92d Aero Squadron (Service), a World War I Air Service squadron at Kelly Field, Texas. The squadron trained with the Royal Flying Corps (later the Royal Air Force) in England, but never served in combat on the Western Front. The squadron returned to the United States in December 1918 and was demobilized.

=== Organization and antisubmarine campaign ===
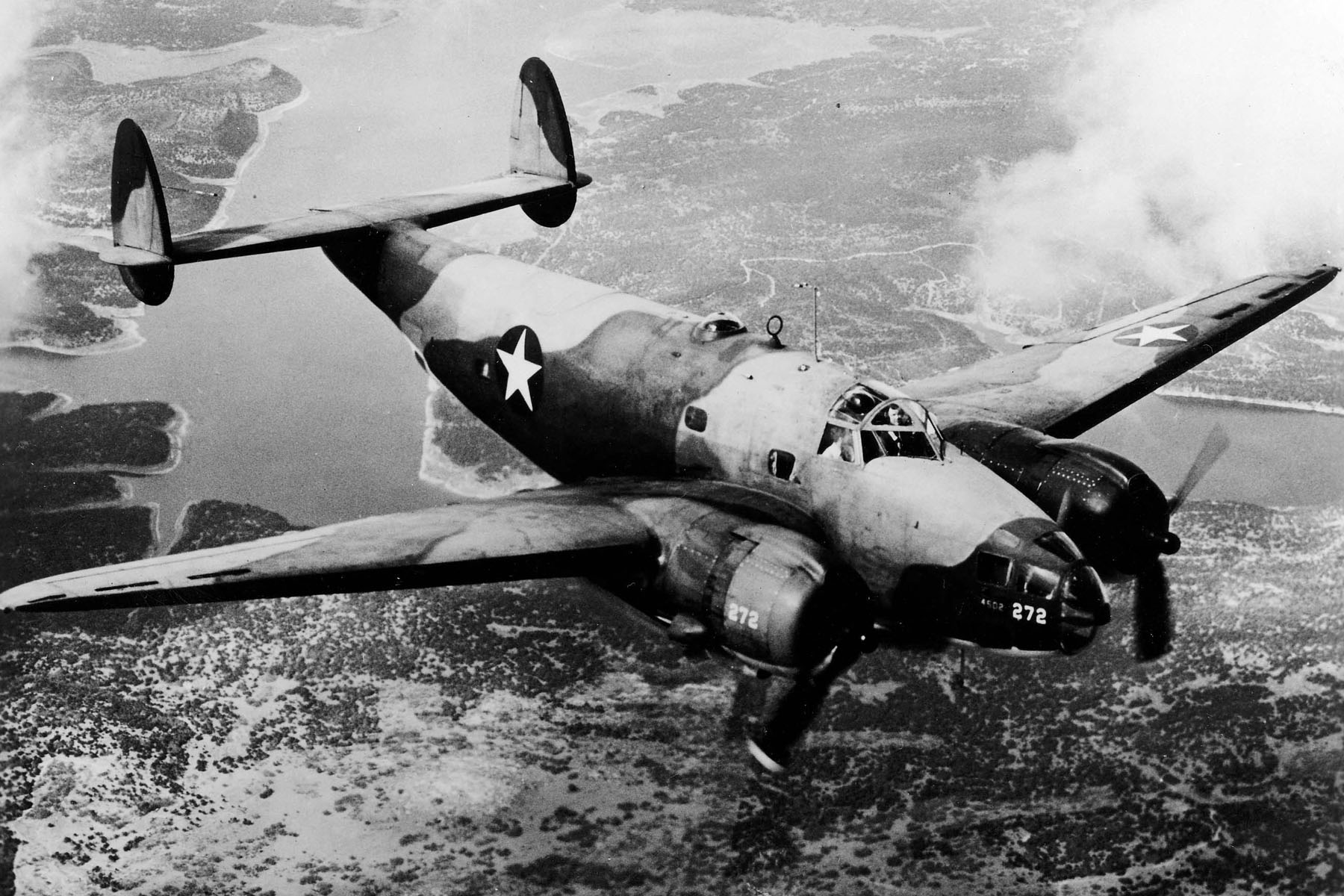
Lockheed B-34 Ventura

The 17th Reconnaissance Squadron was activated in January 1941 at Army Air Base, Savannah as a reconnaissance squadron equipped with Douglas A-20 Havocs (along with a few DB-7s, an export version of the A-20). (Note: The United States impounded 356 DB-7s ordered for France or Great Britain Baugher, Joseph (27 October 2001). "Douglas DB-73". Joe Baugher..) Its initial mission was to support Army units at Fort Stewart in maneuvers. In 17 June moved with the group to Army Air Base, Manchester, New Hampshire.

In August 1942, the squadron was redesignated as the 92d Bombardment Squadron and assigned to the 45th Group when the Air Corps converted its reconnaissance squadrons attached to light bombardment groups to bombardment squadrons. The squadron flew convoy patrols over the New England coast to the Grand Banks of Newfoundland during the summer of 1941, protecting Lend-Lease shipments of supplies and equipment to England.

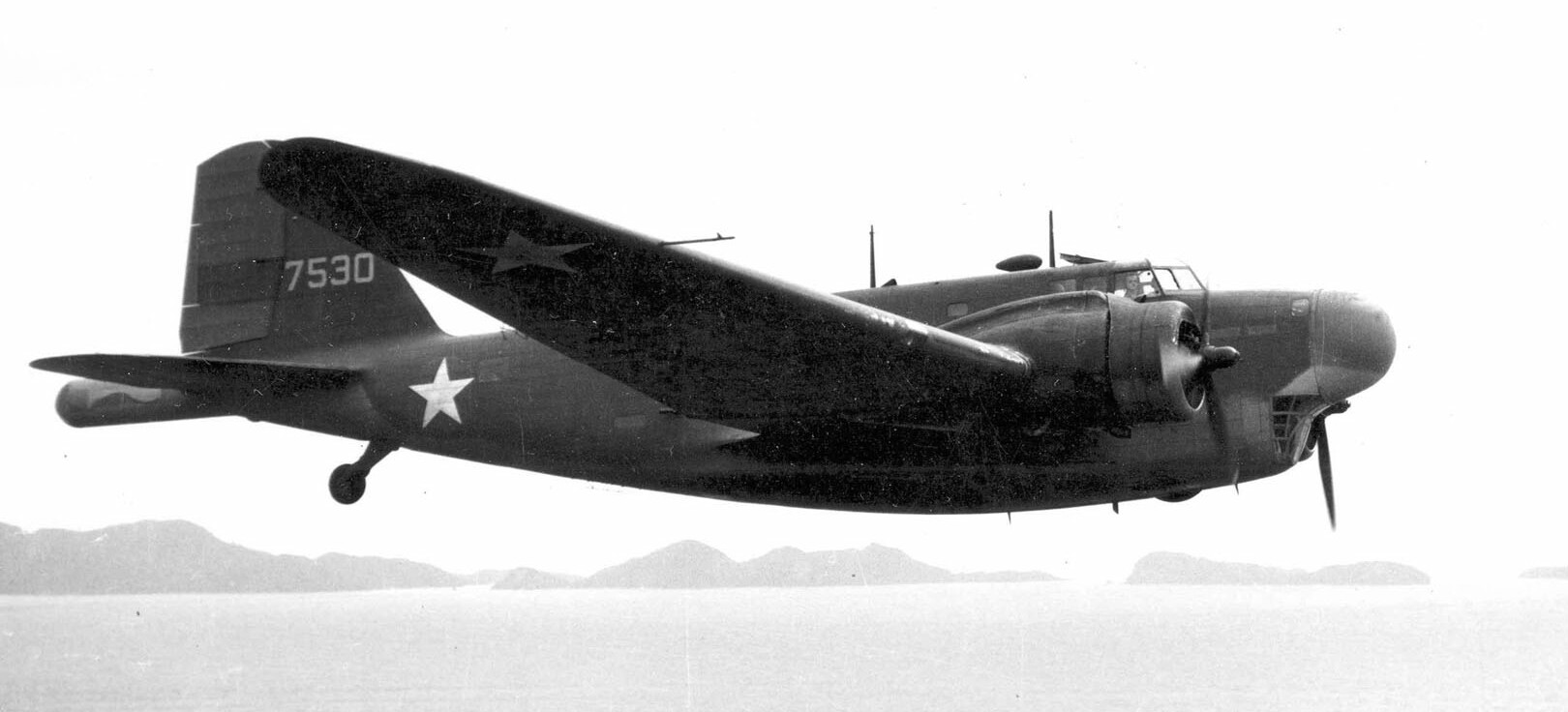
Douglas B-18B equipped for antisubmarine warfare

Following the attack on Pearl Harbor the squadron began flying antisubmarine patrols off the Atlantic coast. By the end of 1941, it began flying the Douglas B-18 Bolo, which was equipped with radar for the antisubmarine mission and, as a medium bomber unit, became the 92d Reconnaissance Squadron until April 1942, when the Army Air Forces converted its remaining reconnaissance squadrons, and it became the 433d Bombardment Squadron. The same month it moved to Mitchel Field, New York, as the 45th Group dispersed its squadrons for greater coverage.

Although squadron headquarters was at Mitchel, detachments operated from Boca Chica Field and Miami Army Air Field, Florida and New Orleans Army Air Base, Louisiana, beginning in May 1942. The emphasis on operations in the Gulf of Mexico was demonstrated when the squadron moved to Miami Army Air Field in June.

In October 1942, the Army Air Forces organized its antisubmarine forces into the single Army Air Forces Antisubmarine Command, which established the 26th Antisubmarine Wing the following month to control its forces operating over the Gulf of Mexico and the Caribbean Sea. The command's bombardment group headquarters, including the 45th, were inactivated and the squadron, now designated the 10th Antisubmarine Squadron, was assigned directly to the 26th Wing.

In July 1943, the AAF and Navy reached an agreement to transfer the coastal antisubmarine mission to the Navy. This mission transfer also included an exchange of AAF long-range bombers equipped for antisubmarine warfare for Navy Consolidated B-24 Liberators without such equipment.

==== Combat in the Pacific ====
The squadron moved to Gowen Field, Idaho where it provided the cadre for the 494th Bombardment Group, a newly forming Consolidated B-24 Liberator heavy bomber unit as the 867th Bombardment Squadron. Aircrews filled out the squadron in March. The air echelon began to receive new B-24Js in May and began departing for Hawaii on 28 May. The ground echelon began its move to Hawaii on 1 June 1944.

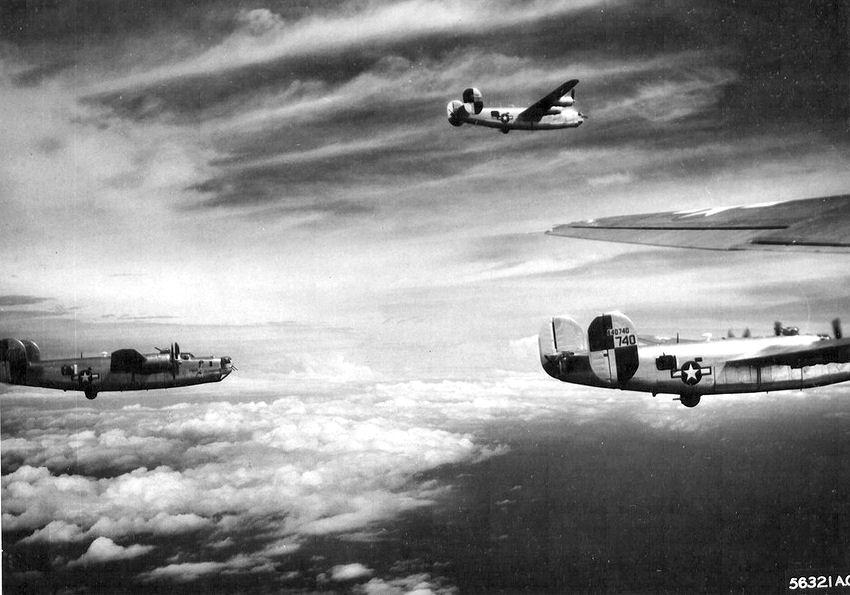
494th Group B-24 Liberators on their way to a target, 24 February 1945 (Note: Aircraft in foreground is Consolidated B-24J-175-CO Liberator, serial 44-40668, Pious Plunderer.)

The squadron remained at Barking Sands Army Air Field for additional training and modifications to its planes to meet theater standards until late September 1944, when it deployed to Angaur Airstrip in the Palau Islands. The squadron ground echelon was initially involved with the construction of the base on Angaur. Although some unit aircrews flew combat missions with the 30th Bombardment Group from Saipan, the air echelon only began to arrive on Angaur on 24 October 1944, after the Seabees and Army engineers had prepared the airstrip for heavy bomber operations. The squadron finally conducted its first mission on 3 November, when it attacked Japanese airfields on Yap and Koror. It conducted attacks on Japanese military that had been bypassed as American forces had advanced in the Central Pacific. It also attacked the Philippines, hitting gun emplacements, bivouacs, and storage depots on Corregidor and Caballo Islands at the entrance to Manila Bay. It also attacked radio communications installations and power plants at Japanese bases in the Philippines; and attacked airfields, including Clark Field on Luzon. Early in 1945, the 867th struck ammunition and supply dumps in the Davao Gulf and Illana Bay areas of Mindanao and airfields on the island.

The squadron moved to Okinawa in June 1945. From its base at Yontan Airfield it engaged primarily in attacks against enemy airfields on Kyūshū and around the Inland Sea of Japan until V-J Day. It also struck airfields in China and Korea. The unit also participated in incendiary raids and dropped propaganda leaflets over urban areas of Kyūshū. After the war's end, the unit transporting personnel and supplies from Manila to Tokyo. In December, the squadron returned to the United States, where it was inactivated at the Fort Lawton Port of Embarkation on 7 January 1946.

=== Remotely piloted aircraft operations ===
The squadron was redesignated 867th Reconnaissance Squadron and on 10 September 2012, the squadron was activated. In May 2016 it was redesignated as the 867th Attack Squadron at Creech Air Force Base, Nevada and assigned to the 732d Operations Group of the 432d Wing.

== Lineage ==
92d Aero Squadron

- Organized as 92d Aero Squadron on 21 August 1917

Demobilized on 21 December 1918

- Reconstituted and consolidated with the 92d Reconnaissance Squadron in 1942

867th Reconnaissance Squadron

- Constituted as the 17th Reconnaissance Squadron (Light) on 20 November 1940
- Activated on 15 January 1941

Redesignated 92d Bombardment Squadron (Light) on 14 August 1941
Redesignated 92d Reconnaissance Squadron (Medium) on 30 December 1941

- Consolidated with the 92d Aero Squadron in 1942

Redesignated 433d Bombardment Squadron (Medium) on 22 April 1942
Redesignated 10th Antisubmarine Squadron (Heavy) on 29 November 1942
Redesignated 867th Bombardment Squadron, Heavy on 21 October 1943
Inactivated on 4 January 1946

- Redesignated 867th Reconnaissance Squadron on 9 August 2012

Activated on 4 June 2012
Redesignated 867th Attack Squadron on 15 May 2016

=== Assignments ===
- Unknown (probably Post Headquarters, Kelly Field), 21 August–October 1917
- Attached to RAF for training, October 1917 – November 1918
- Unknown, November–21 December 1918
- 45th Bombardment Group, attached 15 January 1941, assigned 14 August 1941
- 26th Antisubmarine Wing, 22 November 1942
- 494th Bombardment Group, 1 December 1943 – 4 January 1946
- 732d Operations Group, 4 June 2012 – present

=== Stations ===
- Kelly Field, Texas, 21 August – October 1917
- England, 29 October 1917 – 22 November 1918
- Mitchel Field, New York, c. 4 December 1918 – 21 December 1918
- Army Air Base, Savannah, Georgia, 15 January 1941
- Army Air Base, Manchester (later Grenier Field), New Hampshire, 20 June 1941
- Dow Field, Maine, 3 February 1942
- Mitchel Field, New York, 7 April 1942

Detachments operated from Boca Chica Field and Miami Army Air Field, Florida and from New Orleans Army Air Base, Louisiana, during period May–September 1942

- Miami Army Air Field, Florida, 17 June 1942
- Brookley Field, Alabama, 25 July 1942
- Galveston Army Air Field, Texas, 10 September 1942
- Gowen Field, Idaho, 21 October 1943
- Wendover Field, Utah, 1 December 1943 – 15 April 1944
- Mountain Home Army Air Field, Idaho, 14 April 1944 – 15 June 1944
- Barking Sands Army Air Field, Hawaii Territory, 15 June 1944 – 30 September 1944
- Angaur Airstrip, Palau Islands, 30 September 1944 – 24 June 1945
- Yontan Airfield, Okinawa, Ryukyu Islands, 24 June 1945 – 13 December 1945
- Fort Lawton, Washington, 2 January 1946 – 4 January 1946
- Creech Air Force Base, 10 September 2012 – present

=== Aircraft ===
World War I

- Airco DH.6, 1918
- Avro models, 1918
- Royal Aircraft Factory BE models, 1918
- Royal Aircraft Factory FE models, 1918
- Sopwith Camel, 1918
- Sopwith Pup, 1918

World War II

- Douglas DB-7 Boston, 1941
- Douglas A-20 Havoc, 1941
- Lockheed A-29 Hudson, 1942
- Douglas B-18 Bolo, 1941
- North American B-25 Mitchell, 1943
- Lockheed B-34 Ventura, 1943
- Lockheed RB-37 Ventura, 1942-1943
- Consolidated B-24 Liberator, 1944–1945

=== Awards and campaigns ===
Award streamer	Award	Dates	Notes
	Philippine Republic Presidential Unit Citation	17 October 1944-4 July 1945	867th Bombardment Squadron

Campaign Streamer	Campaign	Dates	Notes
	World War I	29 October 1917 – 11 November 1918	92d Aero Squadron
	Antisubmarine	7 December 1941 – 1 August 1943	92d Bombardment Squadron (later 92d Reconnaissance Squadron, 433d Bombardment Squadron, 10th Antisubmarine Squadron
	Air Offensive, Japan	30 September 1944 – 2 September 1945	867th Bombardment Squadron
	Eastern Mandates	30 September 1944 – 14 April 1944	867th Bombardment Squadron
	Air Combat, Asiatic-Pacific Theater	30 September 1944 – 2 March 1946	867th Bombardment Squadron
	Leyte	17 October 1944 – 1 July 1945	867th Bombardment Squadron
	Luzon	15 December 1944 – 4 July 1945	867th Bombardment Squadron
	Southern Philippines	27 February 1945 – 4 July 1945	867th Bombardment Squadron
	Western Pacific	17 April 1945 – 2 September 1945	867th Bombardment Squadron
	Ryukyus	24 June 1945 – 2 July 1945	867th Bombardment Squadron
	China Offensive	24 June 1945 – 2 September 1945	867th Bombardment Squadron

== See also ==
- List of American Aero Squadrons
- Robert D. Knapp
