= 432nd Operations Group =

432nd Operations Group

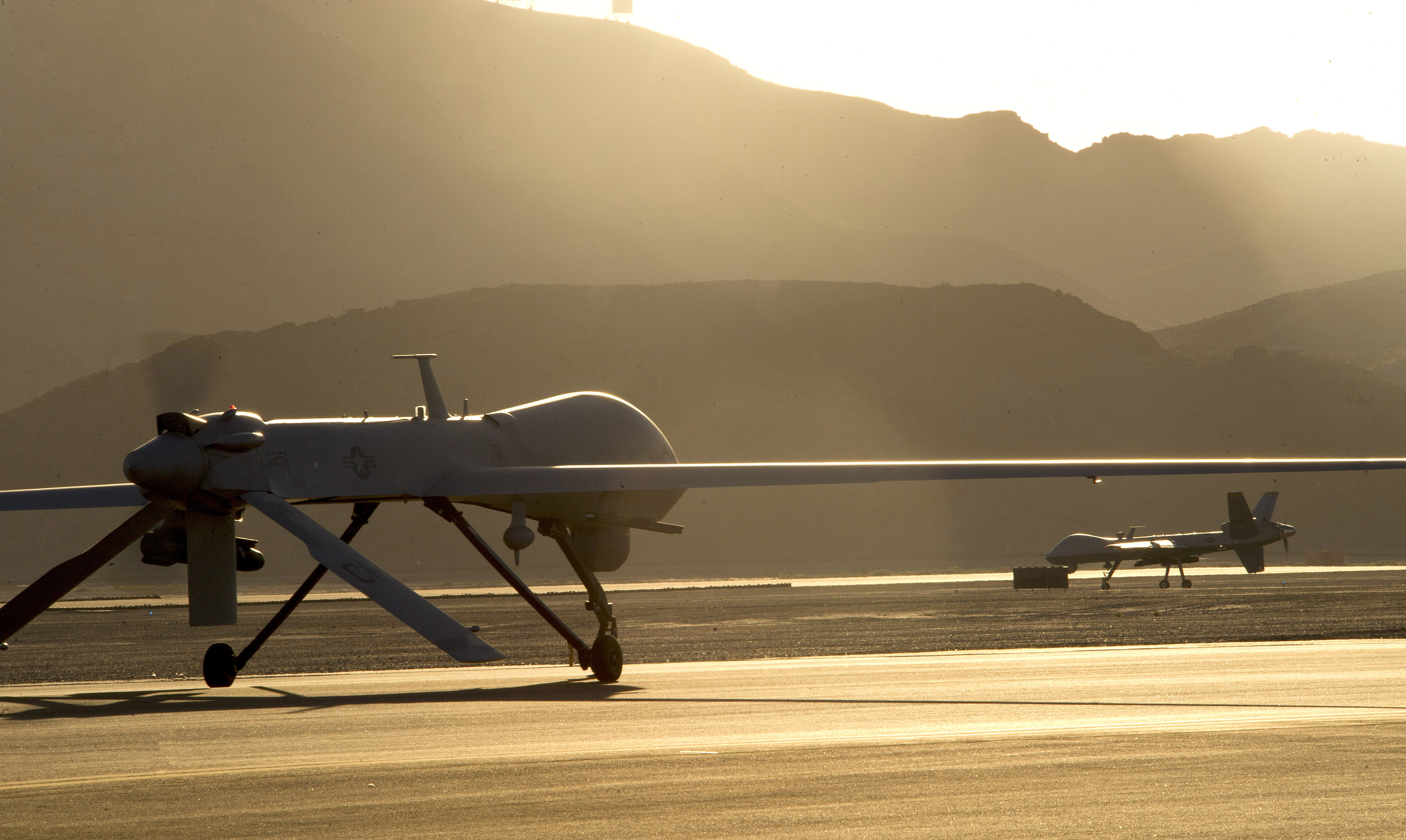
- An MQ-1 Predator and MQ-9 Reaper of the 432nd Wing at Creech AFB in 2014
- Active: 1991–1994; 2007–present
- Country: United States
- Branch: United States Air Force
- Part of: Air Combat Command: Fifteenth Air Force; 432nd Wing
- Garrison/HQ: Creech Air Force Base, Nevada
- Decorations: Air Force Meritorious Unit Award (5x) Air Force Outstanding Unit Award (4x)

Insignia
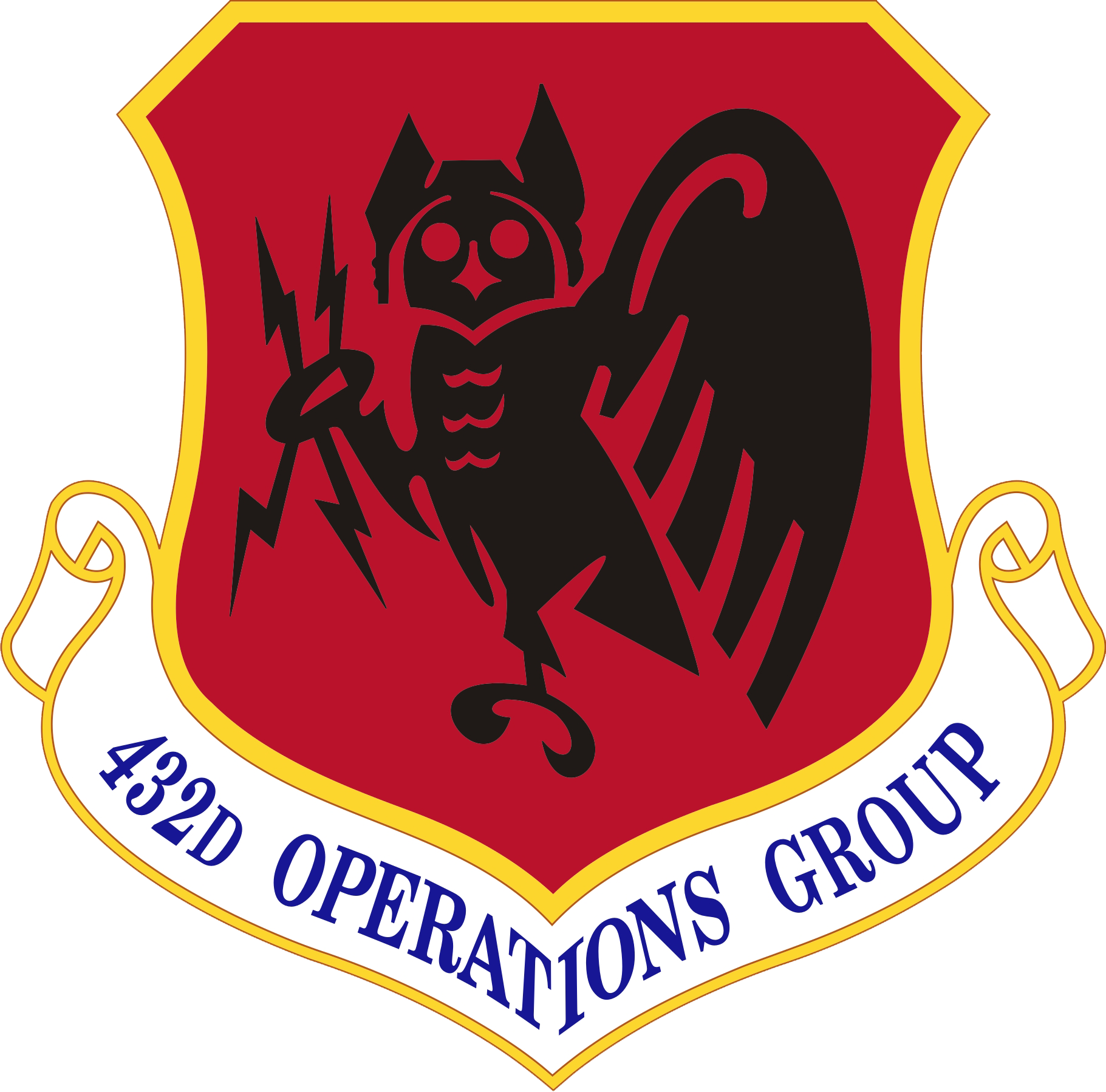
- 432nd Operations Group emblem

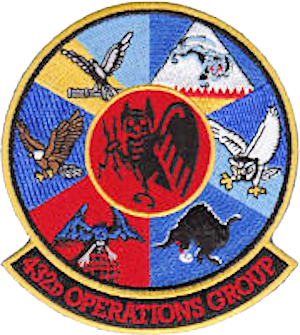
- 432nd Operations Group Gaggle Patch (Note: Gaggle consists of (clockwise from top left): 15th Reconnaissance Squadron, 42nd Attack Squadron, 11th Reconnaissance Squadron, 17th Reconnaissance Squadron, 30th Reconnaissance Squadron, 432nd Operations Support Squadron and 432nd Operations Group (center).)

The 432nd Operations Group (432 OG) is an active flying component of the United States Air Force's 432nd Wing, stationed at Creech Air Force Base, Nevada.

The unit employs unmanned aerial vehicles to support operational needs worldwide and deploys assets globally. This includes combat command and control, tactics development, intelligence support, weather support, and standardization and evaluation oversight for units of United States Air Force's Air Combat Command, Air Forces Central, Air Force Materiel Command, Air National Guard, Air Force Reserve Command, as well as remotely piloted aircraft unit of the Royal Air Force. The unit is also responsible for air traffic control, airfield management, and weather services at Creech Air Force Base.

== Units ==
The 432nd Operations Group consists of the following units as of 2022:

- 11th Attack Squadron
- 30th Reconnaissance Squadron
- 44th Reconnaissance Squadron
- 432nd Operations Support Squadron
- 489th Attack Squadron

== History ==
The unit was activated in 1991 as the 432nd Operations Group under the 432nd Fighter Wing. Controlled two squadrons of F-16 Falcon tactical fighters at Misawa AB, Japan, from 1991 to 1994. Unit inactivated along with parent organization when 35th Fighter Wing was assigned to Misawa and 432nd Wing and component organizations were redesignated.

The unit activated in 2007 when the 432nd Wing was activated and assigned at Creech AFB, Nevada. The unit has control over several squadrons which operate MQ-9 Reapers. The unit's 30th Reconnaissance Squadron and 44th Reconnaissance Squadron operate the RQ-170 Sentinels.

== Lineage ==
- Established as 432nd Operations Group and activated on 31 May 1991

Inactivated on 1 October 1994.

- Activated on 1 May 2007

=== Assignments ===
- 432nd Fighter Wing, 31 May 1991 – 1 October 1994
- 432nd Wing, 1 May 2007 – present

=== Components ===
- 11th Reconnaissance Squadron (later, 11th Attack Squadron), 1 May 2007 – present
- 13th Fighter Squadron, 31 May 1991 – 1 October 1994
- 14th Fighter Squadron, 31 May 1991 – 1 October 1994
- 15th Reconnaissance Squadron (later, 15th Attack Squadron), 1 May 2007 – 2 July 2018
- 17th Reconnaissance Squadron, 1 May 2007 – 10 September 2012
- 18th Reconnaissance Squadron (later, 18th Attack Squadron), 11 December 2009 – 2 July 2018
- 20th Reconnaissance Squadron (later, 20th Attack Squadron), 1 January 2011 – 11 February 2019
- 30th Reconnaissance Squadron, 1 May 2007 – 10 September 2012, 5 April 2019 – present
- 39th Rescue Squadron, 1 February 1993 – 1 August 1994
- 42nd Attack Squadron, 1 May 2007 – 5 April 2019 (Note: As of 2022, the 42nd Attack Squadron is in dormant status and part of the 25th Attack Group.)
- 44th Reconnaissance Squadron, 5 April 2019 – present
- 50th Attack Squadron, 27 February 2018 – 2 October 2018
- 89th Attack Squadron, 1 October 2015 – 22 March 2019
- 432nd Operations Support Squadron, 1 May 2007 – present
- 489th Attack Squadron, 2 December 2016 – present

=== Stations ===
- Misawa AB, Japan, 31 May 1991 – 1 October 1994
- Creech AFB, Nevada, 1 May 2007 – present

=== Aircraft ===
- F-16 Falcon (1991–1994)
- HH-60 Pavehawk (1993–1994)
- RQ-1 Predator (later, MQ-1 Predator), (2007–unknown) (Note: The U.S. Air Force has retired the MQ-1 Predator as of 9 March 2018.)
- MQ-9 Reaper, (2007–present)
- RQ-170 Sentinel, (2007–2012; unknown–present) (Note: The RQ-170 Sentinel is operated by the 30th and 44th Reconnaissance Squadrons, both of which are part of the 432nd Operations Group as of 2022.)
