= 17th Attack Squadron =

17th Attack Squadron

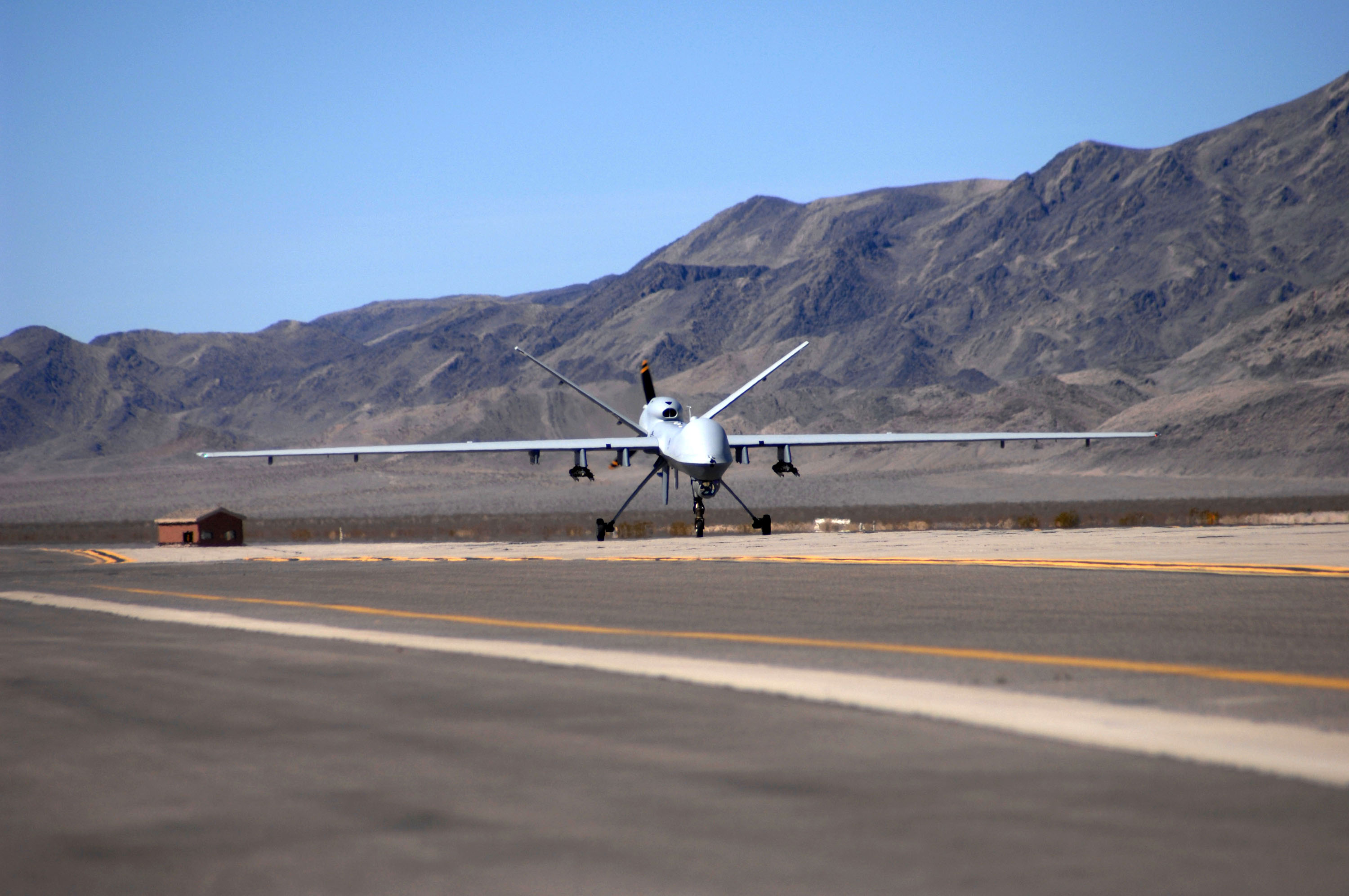
- MQ-9 Reaper at Creech AFB
- Active: 1942-1946; 1951-1979; 2002-present
- Country: United States
- Branch: United States Air Force
- Role: Attack
- Part of: Air Combat Command
- Garrison/HQ: Creech Air Force Base
- Nickname(s): Bulls
- Colors: Blue, Red, Black
- Engagements: Southwest Pacific Theater
- Decorations: Air Force Meritorious Unit Award; Air Force Outstanding Unit Award; Philippine Presidential Unit Citation

Insignia
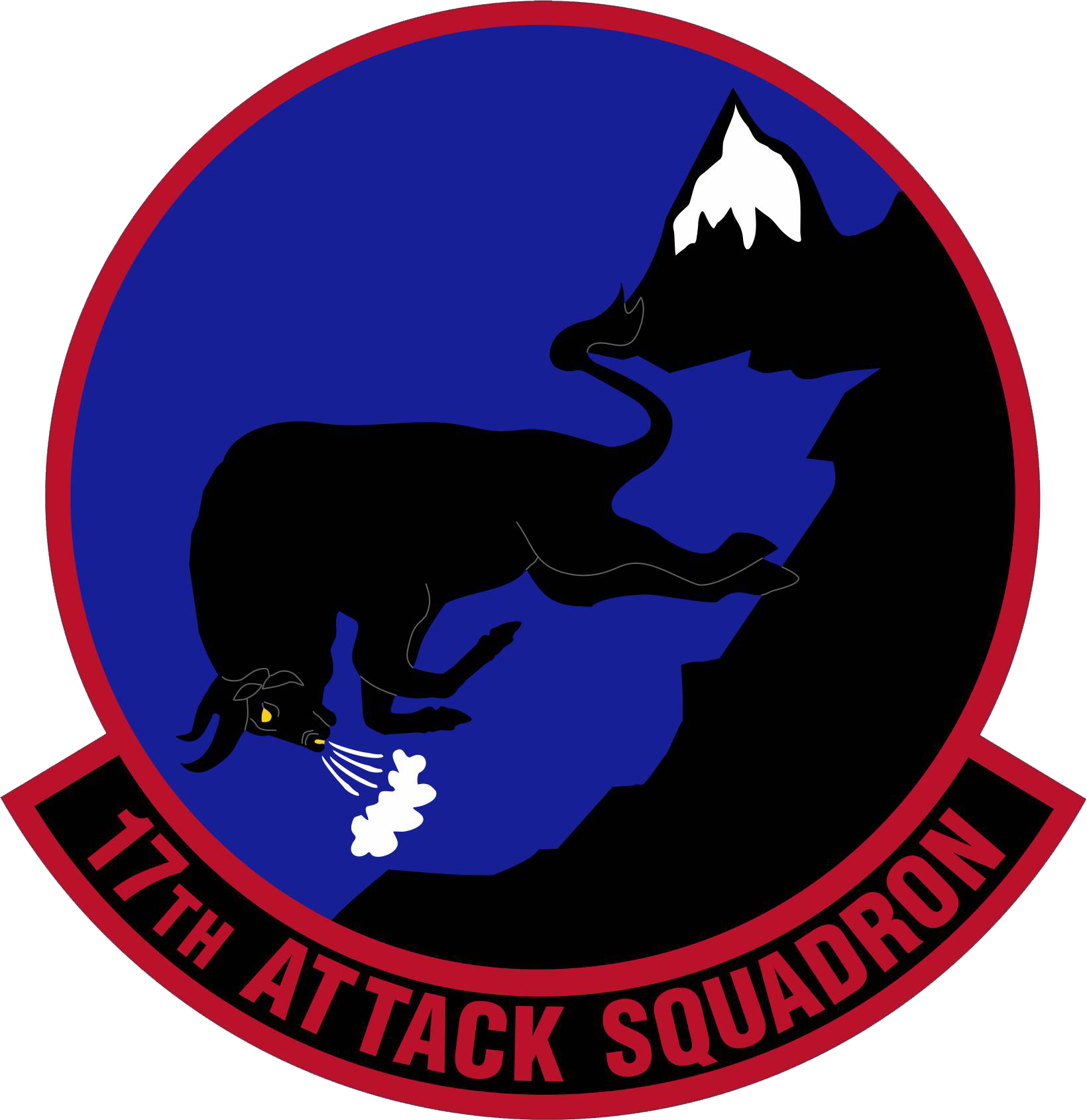
- 17th Attack Squadron emblem (approved 4 January 2008)

The 17th Attack Squadron is a squadron of the United States Air Force. It is assigned to the 432d Wing, and stationed at Creech Air Force Base in Indian Springs, Nevada. The 17th is equipped with the MQ-9 Reaper.

== Overview ==
The 17th conducts intelligence, surveillance, and reconnaissance operating the MQ-9 Reaper remotely piloted aircraft.

== History ==
=== World War II ===
Constituted as 17 Photographic Reconnaissance Squadron on 14 Jul 1942. Activated on 23 Jul 1942 with Lightning P-38/F-5 reconnaissance aircraft at Colorado Springs AAB, CO. Redesignated as: 17 Photographic Squadron (Light) on 6 Feb 1943; 17 Photographic Reconnaissance Squadron on 13 Nov 1943. Deployed to the South Pacific Area, assigned to Thirteenth Air Force. Flew hazardous unarmed reconnaissance missions over enemy-held territory in Guadalcanal; New Guinea; Northern Solomon Islands; Bismarck Archipelago; Western Pacific; Leyte; Luzon; Southern Philippines; Central Burma and southeast China. Inactivated in the Philippines, 19 April 1946.

Redesignated as 17 Tactical Reconnaissance Squadron, Photo-Jet on 1 Apr 1951. Activated on 2 Apr 1951 at Shaw AFB, South Carolina. Redesignated as 17 Tactical Reconnaissance Squadron on 1 Oct 1966. Inactivated 1 January 1979. Redesignated as 17 Reconnaissance Squadron on 4 Mar 2002. Activated on 8 March 2002 at Indian Springs AFAF (later, Creech AFB), NV. Redesignated as 17 Attack Squadron on 15 May 2016.

=== Cold War reconnaissance ===
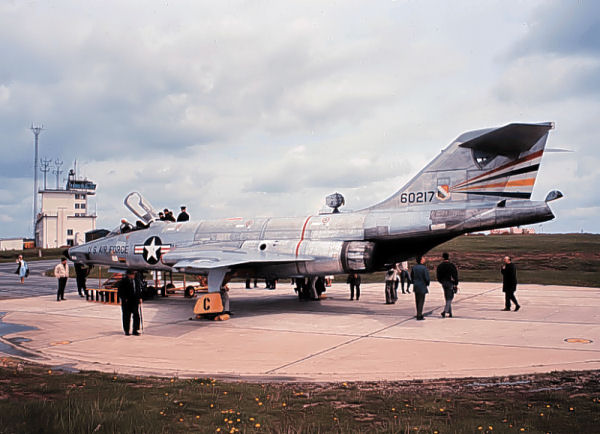
McDonnell RF-101F-56-MC Voodoo 56–0217 at Laon Air Base France, 1959

Aactivated at Shaw Air Force Base, South Carolina in 1951 as a photo-reconnaissance training squadron. Equipped with several reconnaissance aircraft during the 1950s, deploying to NATO in 1959 with the McDonnell RF-101C Voodoo. Operated from France until 1966, moving to RAF Upper Heyford, England. Remained in England until 1970, moved to Zweibrucken AB, West Germany and re-equipped with McDonnell RF-4C Phantom II aircraft. Remained at Zweibrücken Air Base until 1 January 1979.

=== Unmanned vehicle operations ===
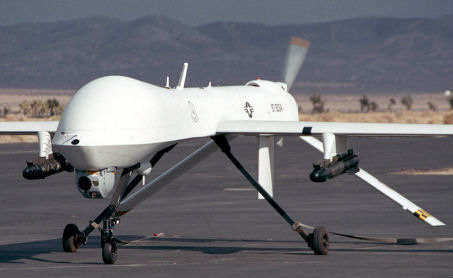
MQ-1 Predator UAV

The squadron was activated at what was then known as Indian Springs Air Force Auxiliary Field (now Creech Air Force Base) on 8 March 2002, flying the MQ-1 Predator. Added the larger and more heavily armed MQ-9 Reaper in 2006.

According to the 2014 documentary film Drone, since 2002 the squadron had been working for the Central Intelligence Agency as "customer", carrying out armed missions in Pakistan.

== Lineage ==
- Constituted as the 17th Photographic Reconnaissance Squadron on 14 July 1942

Activated on 23 July 1942
Redesignated 17th Photographic Squadron (Light) on 6 February 1943
Redesignated 17th Photographic Reconnaissance Squadron on 13 November 1943
Inactivated on 19 April 1946

- Redesignated 17th Tactical Reconnaissance Squadron, Photo-Jet on 1 April 1951

Activated on 2 April 1951
Redesignated 17th Tactical Reconnaissance Squadron on 1 October 1966
Inactivated 1 January 1979

- Redesignated 17th Reconnaissance Squadron on 4 March 2002

Activated on 8 March 2002

- Redesignated 17th Attack Squadron on 15 May 2016

=== Assignments ===
- 4th Photographic Group (later 4th Photographic Reconnaissance and Mapping Group, 4th Photographic Group 4th Reconnaissance Group), 23 July 1942
- Thirteenth Air Force, 5 December 1945
- XIII Fighter Command, 10 December 1945
- 85th Fighter Wing; 1 February 1946
- Pacific Air Command, U. S. Army, 1–19 April 1946
- 363d Tactical Reconnaissance Group, 2 April 1951
- 432d Tactical Reconnaissance Wing, 8 February 1958
- 66th Tactical Reconnaissance Wing, 10 May 1959
- 86th Tactical Fighter Wing, 12 January 1970
- 26th Tactical Reconnaissance Wing, 31 January 1973 – 1 January 1979
- 57th Operations Group, 8 March 2002 – 1 May 2007
- 432d Operations Group, 1 May 2007
- 732d Operations Group, 10 September 2012 – present

=== Stations ===
- Colorado Springs Army Air Base, Colorado, 23 July – 24 October 1942
- Camp Deptha, Nouméa, New Caledonia, 2 December 1942
- Henderson Field (Guadalcanal), Guadalcanal, Solomon Islands, 16 January 1943

Detachment operated from: Munda Airfield, New Georgia, Solomon Islands, c. 13 October 1943 – 31 January 1944, 9 March – 1 April 1944
Detachment operated from: Buka Airfield, Bougainville, Solomon Islands, c. 11 December 1943 – February 1945
Detachment operated from: Kornasoren (Yebrurro) Airfield, Noemfoor, Schouten Islands, 8–23 October 1944
Detachment operated from: Sansapor Airfield, Netherlands East Indies, 13 October – 4 November 1944

- Wama Airfield, Morotai, Netherlands East Indies, 4 November 1944

Detachment operated from: Dulag Airfield, Leyte, Philippines, 9 February–October 1945

- Puerto Princesa Airfield, Palawan, Philippines, 11 May 1945 – 19 April 1946
- Shaw Air Force Base, South Carolina, 2 April 1951 – 10 May 1959
- Laon-Couvron Air Base, France, 10 May 1959
- RAF Upper Heyford, England, September 1966
- Zweibrücken Air Base, Germany, 12 January 1970 – 1 January 1979
- Indian Springs Air Force Auxiliary Field (later Creech Air Force Base), Nevada, 8 March 2002 – present

=== Aircraft ===
- Lockheed P-38 Lightning, 1942–1946
- North American B-25 Mitchell, 1944–1946
- North American F-6 Mustang, 1946
- Lockheed RF-80 Shooting Star, 1951–1955
- Republic RF-84F Thunderflash, 1954–1958
- McDonnell RF-101C Voodoo, 1957–1969
- McDonnell RF-4C Phantom II, 1969–1978
- MQ-1 Predator, 2002–2018
- MQ-9 Reaper, 2006–present
