= Terry A. Simmons =

Canadian-American geographer and lawyer (1946-2020)

Terry Allan Simmons
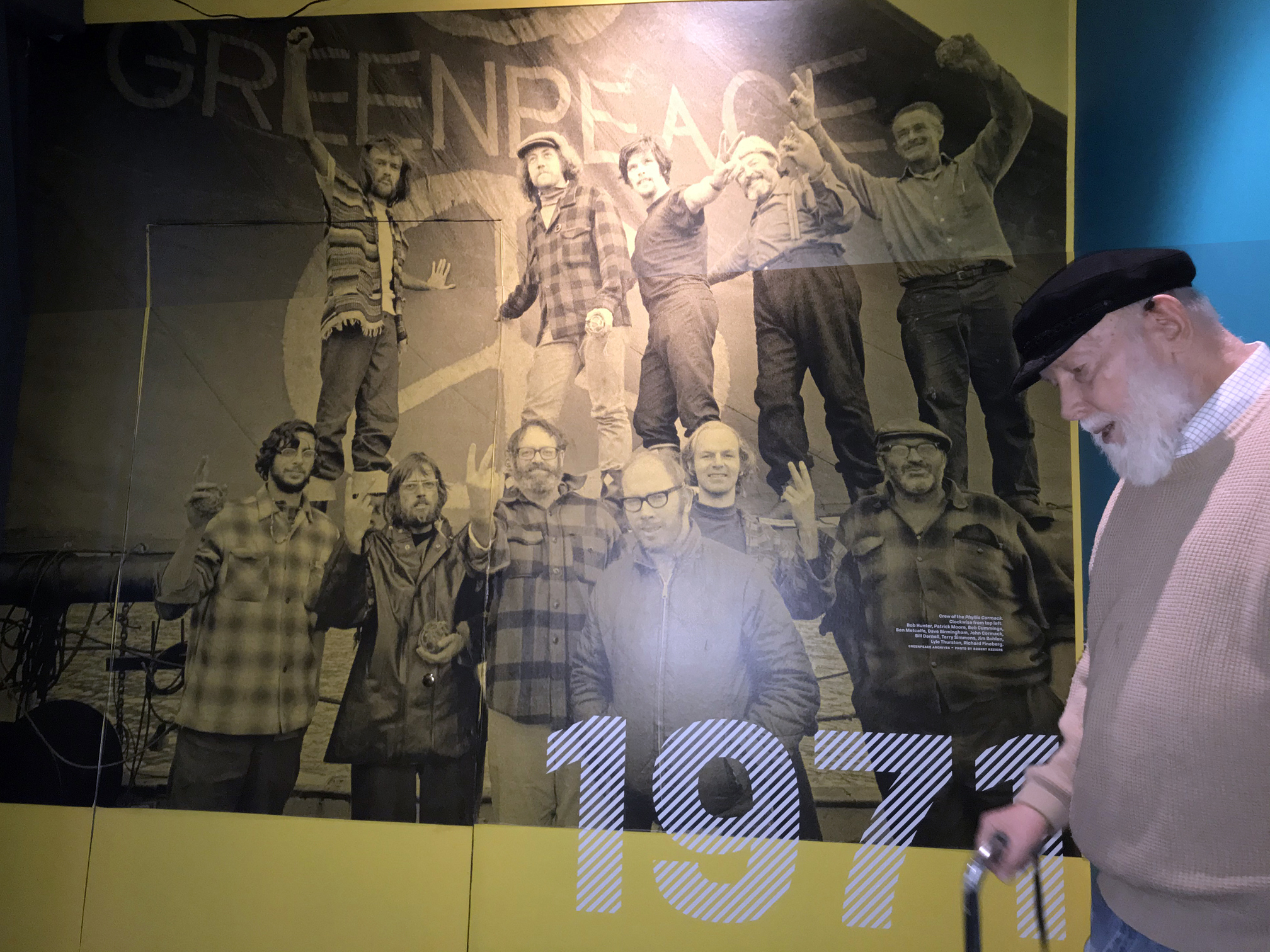
- Simmons at Vancouver Maritime Museum in 2020
- Born: April 12, 1946; Butte, California, U.S.
- Died: November 14, 2020 (aged 74); Vancouver, British Columbia, Canada
- Resting place: Surrey Centre Cemetery, Surrey British Columbia
- Education: UC Santa Cruz, Simon Fraser University, University of Minnesota, UC Berkeley
- Known for: Co-founder of the Sierra Club of BC, participant of the "Don't Make a Wave Committee"

Terry Allan Simmons (April 12, 1946 – November 14, 2020) was a Canadian-American lawyer and cultural geographer, and the founder of the British Columbia Sierra Club. In this role, he participated in the Don't Make A Wave Committee, understood as the origin of the environmental organization Greenpeace.

Though unnoticed at the time, Simmons' death was subsequently reported by the Canadian Broadcasting Corporation, as well as the French-language Radio-Canada

There is a plaque on the False Creek sea wall in Vancouver, that commemorates Greenpeace's inaugural voyage and the people on the ship. Simmons' name is listed on that plaque.

== Early life and education ==
Born in Butte, California, Simmons grew up in Yuba City, where he attended Yuba City High School, graduating in 1964. His parents were Daniel F. Simmons and Jeanne Marlow. Terry was predeceased by a twin brother, Gary. He also had a sister, Deborah.

Simmons completed an undergraduate degree in Anthropology at the University of California Santa Cruz, in 1968. As such, he was among the first alumni of that institution.

At Simon Fraser University, in Burnaby, British Columbia, he undertook graduate studies in the Geography Department. His MA thesis was on the High Ross Dam Controversy. Supervised by Edward M. Gibson, with Len Evenden as committee member, Simmons concluded those studies in 1974.

Thereafter, Simmons undertook his terminal degree in Cultural Geography, at the University of Minnesota under the supervision of noted Humanistic Geographer Yi-Fu Tuan. One of Simmons' fellow grad students was Economic Geographer Trevor J. Barnes. Simmons' dissertation was an examination of the British Columbia back-to-the-land movement.

Simmons also undertook a subsequent JD degree in 1989 at the Boalt Hall School of Law, University of California, Berkeley. He was called to the bar, practicing in California and Nevada.

== Anti-war, anti-nuclear and environmental activism ==
The 1960s nuclear arms race between the United States and the Soviet Union precipitated many nuclear tests. Students from the University of British Columbia, and other institutions, held a large protest against such tests at the Peace Arch Border Crossing in October 1969.

Terry Simmons, before moving to Vancouver for graduate studies, had spent the summer of 1968 as a research assistant in the national office of the Sierra Club in San Francisco. Struck by the lack of similar environmental groups in BC, Simmons contacted local subscribers to the Sierra Club Bulletin, and convened a meeting that led to the incorporation of SCBC to “explore, enjoy and preserve the scenic resources of British Columbia, in particular its forests, waters, and wilderness.”

In autumn 1969, Simmons became the first chairman of the newly formed Sierra Club of BC. At the first meeting, held on the SFU campus on Burnaby Mountain, over 100 members signed up to join the organization. Two of those attendees were Jim Bohlen and Irving Stowe, who along with Paul Cote would later be considered Greenpeace co-founders. The first three projects of the BC Sierra Club were declared to be opposing the proposed Cypress Mountain Ski Area resort, campaigning against offshore oil development in the Strait of Georgia, and the preservation of "University Beach" also known as Wreck Beach. Simmons advocated for the American club's involvement in the fight against the ski resort, given their expertise in waging environmental campaigns. Simmons incorporated The Sierra Club of BC under the British Columbia Societies Act, and this move got Simmons summoned to San Francisco, as it meant that Simmons held local legal title to the Sierra Club name and intellectual property. The Sierra Club San Francisco volunteer lawyers scrambled to catch up and ascertain that Simmons meant well and that he did not intend on damaging the Club's reputation.

In this same period, as Sierra Club of BC representative, Simmons was elected vice-president of the also newly formed BC Environmental Council. The council was founded as a coordinating and advisory body for BC anti-pollution groups.

A year later, Simmons added to his roles, taking on the job of Secretary of "Run Out Skagit Spoilers" (ROSS) promising to fight "until the last cubic inch of cement is poured", against Seattle City Light's plan to raise the Ross Dam by 125 feet.

Also in early 1970, Jim Bohlen, representing both the Sierra Club of BC, and the Don't Make A Wave Committee, was interviewed on Vancouver talk radio, in which he blurted out that he would visit Amchitka Alaska to witness an American nuclear test. His various roles were not distinct, and as a result, the press began asking the San Francisco Sierra Club about this planned journey. The Club directors were shocked, and not amused. Simmons was again summoned to a Sierra Club board meeting in Los Angeles to explain himself, as the Club did not support the activities of the Don't Make A Wave Committee. The Club wished to restrict its activities to the Environmental movement, rather than the Peace Movement

Simmons understood the Don't Make A Wave Committee to be a limited three people trying to charter a boat, and that they were not acting on behalf of the Sierra Club, so he was able to assure the Club that all was well. After a fundraising rock concert at which Joni Mitchell, James Taylor, Phil Ochs, and the local Vancouver band Chilliwack performed, enough money was raised to charter a vessel for the trip to Alaska.

The Don't Make A Wave Committee announced the crew members in May 1970, who would sail aboard the fishing-vessel cum protest-boat Phyllis Cormack. The crew included Captain John Cormack (the boat's owner), Jim Bohlen, Bill Darnell, Patrick Moore, Dr Lyle Thurston, Dave Birmingham, Terry Simmons, Richard Fineberg, Robert Hunter (journalist), Ben Metcalfe (journalist), Bob Cummings (journalist) and Bob Keziere (photographer).

The boat was to sail for 12 days, or 2,600 miles, from Vancouver to the Aleutian Island of Amchitcka, Alaska, to protest a proposed American nuclear test. Terry Simmons, then a 25-year-old Simon Fraser University graduate student, was included among the crew as "geographer," "who would act as legal advisor". The Phyllis Cormack was renamed the "Greenpeace" for the voyage, and the journey is understood to have been the genesis of what is now an International Environmental organization.

Once at Alaska, the Phyllis Cormack was detained by the US Coast Guard because the captain had not stopped to clear US Customs. However, the activists received mixed messages. Officially, they were ordered to stop and be charged with violations. At the same time, they were handed a letter, with the signatures of 18 coast guard members, who supported the activists in their opposition of the underground nuclear tests. Simmons ascribed this support to the presence of the four journalists on board the vessel, and the extensive media coverage of the anti-nuclear activists message. The petition's existence received significant coverage in the US media, at a time in which there were very few stations. Part of the information sophistication resulted from crew members' spouses, back in Vancouver, who shared information with the media. These individuals included Mary Bohlan and Dorothy Stowe.

On May 10, 1972, Simmons participated in a Minneapolis anti-war protest at the University of Minnesota, and was one of four students arraigned on gross misdemeanor and felony charges. He was charged with aggravated assault and rioting, and bail for each of the four was set at $1000. Simmons received one year probation for his efforts.

In a 1973 interview, speaking as vice-chairman of the Sierra Club of BC, Simmons warned that "Alaska pipeline interests" were sneaking a bill through the US Senate to authorize the US Secretary of the Interior to permit rights-of-way on Federal land. Simmons warned that this move would sidestep recent court cases that delayed pipeline construction activity. Simmons declared that the club was opposed to the pipeline because of its potential for both economic and environmental "trouble in Canada". The energy industry continued to attract Simmons interest, and he appeared at a hearing of the BC Energy Commission to cross examine statements made on behalf of the Canadian Petroleum Association. When told that the natural gas producers were "in the red" to the tune of $705 million, Simmons asked why producers remained in business, despite the losses. He was informed in reply, that "oil and gas people are the most optimistic in the world, and feel that conditions must improve."

== Legal career ==
In 1989, Simmons served as a law clerk at the Alaska Supreme Court, and in the then Land and Natural Resources Division of the US Attorney's Office in San Francisco. Simmons was a Nevada Supreme Court Settlement Judge, where he mediated appellate cases, and was an active arbitrator in Nevada district and trial level courts. Simmons ran for election as a non-partisan District 2 Court Judge in Nevada in 1996. His bid was not successful.

== Other appointments and affiliations ==
In 1975, Simmons was a lecturer in Geography at Lakehead University, in Thunder Bay, Ontario. He also taught geography, at different times, at Simon Fraser University, Fraser Valley University College (as it was then known), Truckee Meadows Community College, Western Nevada Community College, and on the Mount Currie Indian Reserve.

Simmons was appointed as one of six directors, to the Forest Research Council of BC, in 1981. He was a founding member of the Forest History Association of British Columbia, in 1982. At the time of his death in autumn 2020, he was still an active association member, serving as a director. Simmons was an advisory board member of the Berkeley Canadian Studies Program. Simmons was Treasurer of the Eugen Rosenstock-Huessy Society.

Simmons was an active participant of the Vancouver St John's Anglican Church "Learner's Exchange". In this capacity he delivered at least one lecture on the relationship between science and Genesis.

== Publications ==
- The Damnation of a Dam: The High Ross Dam Controversy. 1974. MA Thesis, Department of Geography, Simon Fraser University. http://summit.sfu.ca/item/4419
- But We Must Cultivate Our Garden: Twentieth Century Pioneering in Rural British Columbia. 1979. PhD Thesis, Department of Geography, University of Minnesota.
- Multilateral Federalism Along a Bilateral Boundary: On Bilateral, National, and Subnational Transboundary Environmental Management on the Columbia River. 2006. In Convergence and Divergence in North America: Canada and the United States. Centre for Canadian Studies, Simon Fraser University. http://staff.washington.edu/nfabbi/Convergence.pdf
- Vogeler, Ingolf, and Terry Simmons. 1975. "Settlement Morphography of South Dakota Indian Reservations." Yearbook of the Association of Pacific Coast Geographers 37:91-108.
- Review of Infections and Inequalities: The Modern Plagues by Paul Farmer. In Yearbook of the Association of Pacific Coast Geographers, Vol. 62 (2000), pp. 155–157 (3 pages).
- Terry Simmons, (1986), ”The Bridge Builder in Quest of Community” in Bryant, M. Darrol, and Hans R. Huessy, eds., Eugen Rosenstock-Huessy: Studies in His Life and Thought (Lewiston, NY/Queenston, Ontario: Edwin Mellen Press, 1986). The book is vol. 28 in the series, Toronto Studies in Theology, being seventeen essays derived from a conference on R-H at Renison College at the University of Waterloo, in Waterloo, Ontario, in 1982.

== Presentations ==
- Terry Simmons (2002). "Eugen Rosenstock-Huessy Among the Redwoods: Language, Universal History and the Liberal Arts College Ideal" presented at "Planetary Articulation: The Life, Thought and Influence of Eugen Rosenstock-Huessy", sponsored by Milken University and the E.R-H Fund, Meeting in Monticello Illinois, June 2002.
- Terry Simmons (2006). "Varieties of Military Experience: Rosenstock-Huessy, William James, and the Moral Equivalent of War" presented at "Rosenstock-Heussey Roundtable, meeting in Norwich Vermont, July 7, 2006.
