= Patrick Moore (consultant) =

Canadian industry consultant, former activist

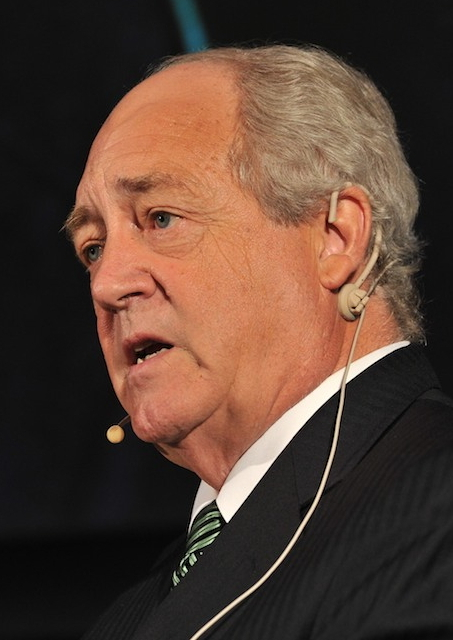
- Moore at TEDxVancouver 2009
- Born: Patrick Albert Moore; June 15, 1947 (age 79); Port Alice, British Columbia, Canada
- Citizenship: Canadian
- Education: University of British Columbia (Ph.D., 1974); University of British Columbia (B.Sc., 1969)
- Known for: Conflict and former work with Greenpeace
- Scientific career
- Workplaces: Ecosense Environmental Inc.; Greenspirit Strategies; Greenpeace (former)
- Thesis: Administration of Pollution Control in British Columbia: A Focus on the Mining Industry (1974)
- Doctoral advisors: Hamish Kimmins; C.S. Holling

Patrick Albert Moore (born June 15, 1947) is a Canadian industry consultant, former activist and an early member and past president of Greenpeace Canada. Since leaving Greenpeace in 1986, Moore has criticized the environmental movement for what he sees as scare tactics and disinformation, saying that the environmental movement "abandoned science and logic in favour of emotion and sensationalism". Greenpeace has criticized Moore, calling him "a paid spokesman for the nuclear industry, the logging industry, and genetic engineering industry" who "exploits long-gone ties with Greenpeace to sell himself as a speaker and pro-corporate spokesperson".

Since leaving Greenpeace, Moore has frequently taken sharp public stances against a number of major environmental groups, including Greenpeace itself, on many issues including forestry, nuclear energy, genetically modified organisms, and pesticide use. Moore has also denied the established consensus of the scientific community on climate change, for example by claiming that increased carbon dioxide in Earth's atmosphere is beneficial, that there is no proof that anthropogenic carbon dioxide emissions are responsible for global warming, and that even if true, increased temperature would be beneficial to life on Earth. These views are contradicted by the scientific consensus on the effects of global warming, which holds that climate change is expected to have a significant and irreversible negative impact on climate and weather events around the world, posing severe risks like ocean acidification and sea level rise to human society and to other organisms.

== Early life ==
Moore was born in 1947 to Bill and Beverley Moore in Port Alice, British Columbia, and raised in Winter Harbour, on Vancouver Island. He is the third generation of a British Columbian family with a long history in forestry and fishing. His father, William D. Moore, was the president of the B.C. Truck Loggers Association and past president of the Pacific Logging Congress. Moore was educated at St. George's School, then attended the University of British Columbia, where he obtained a B.Sc. in Forest Biology in 1969, and a Ph.D. in 1974. For his PhD, Moore researched heavy metal contamination in Rupert Inlet by mine tailings. He concluded that existing mechanisms had failed to prevent unacceptable pollution.

== Career ==
=== Greenpeace ===
The Don't Make a Wave Committee (DMWC) was formed in January 1970 by Dorothy and Irving Stowe, Ben Metcalfe, Marie and Jim Bohlen, Paul Cote, and Bob Hunter and incorporated in October 1970. The committee had formed to plan opposition to the testing of a one megaton hydrogen bomb in 1969 by the United States Atomic Energy Commission on Amchitka Island in the Aleutians. In 1971, Moore joined the committee as a member of the crew of the Greenpeace, a chartered fishing boat originally named the Phyllis Cormack which the Committee sent across the North Pacific to draw attention to the US testing of a 5 megaton bomb planned for September of that year. As Greenpeace co-founder Bob Hunter wrote, "Moore was quickly accepted into the inner circle on the basis of his scientific background, his reputation [as an environmental activist], and his ability to inject practical, no-nonsense insights into the discussions." In May 1971, Moore travelled to Alaska with Jim Bohlen, representing the DMWC at US Atomic Energy Commission hearings. Moore attended DMWC meetings, and was part of the committee when its name was changed to the Greenpeace Foundation. Other committee members included committee founders Bob Hunter, Rod Marining and Ben Metcalfe. Moore describes himself as a founding member of Greenpeace, but the organization denies this claim.

Following US President Richard Nixon's cancellation of the remaining hydrogen bomb tests planned for Amchitka Island in early 1972, Greenpeace turned its attention to French atmospheric nuclear testing at Mururoa Atoll in the South Pacific. In May 1972, Moore travelled to New York with Jim Bohlen and Marie Bohlen to lobby the key United Nations delegations from the Pacific Rim countries involved. Moore then went to Europe together with Ben Metcalfe, Dorothy Metcalfe, Lyle Thurston and Rod Marining where they received an audience with Pope Paul VI and protested at Notre-Dame de Paris cathedral. In June, they attended the first UN Conference on the Environment in Stockholm where they convinced New Zealand to propose a vote condemning French nuclear testing, which passed with a strong majority.

Moore again crewed the Phyllis Cormack in 1975 during the first campaign to save whales, as Greenpeace met the Soviet whaling fleet off the coast of California. During the confrontation, film footage was caught of the Soviet whaling boat firing a harpoon over the heads of Greenpeace members in a Zodiac inflatable and into the back of a female sperm whale. The film footage made the evening news the next day on all three US national networks, initiating Greenpeace's debut on the world media stage, and prompting a swift rise in public support of the charity. Patrick Moore and Bob Hunter appeared on Dr. Bill Wattenburg's talk radio show on KGO and appealed for a lawyer to help them incorporate a branch office in San Francisco and to manage donations. David Tussman, a young lawyer, volunteered to help Moore, Hunter, and Paul Spong set up an office at Fort Mason. The Greenpeace Foundation of America (since changed to Greenpeace USA), then became the major fundraising center for the expansion of Greenpeace worldwide.

=== Presidency of Greenpeace Foundation in Canada ===
In January 1977 at the annual general meeting of the Greenpeace Foundation, Moore ran for president against Bob Hunter, eventually losing by a single vote. Soon after, Hunter stepped down and Moore assumed the presidency, inheriting an organization deeply in debt. Greenpeace organizations began to form throughout North America, including cities such as Toronto, Montreal, Seattle, Portland, Los Angeles, Boston, and San Francisco. Not all of these offices accepted the authority of the founding organization in Canada. Moore's presidency and governance style proved controversial. Moore and his chosen board in Vancouver called for two meetings to formalize his governance proposals. During this time David Tussman, together with the rest of the founders, early activists of Greenpeace, and the majority of Greenpeace staff members announced that the board of the San Francisco group intended to separate Patrick Moore's Greenpeace Foundation from the rest of the Greenpeace movement. After efforts to settle the matter failed, the Greenpeace Foundation filed a civil lawsuit in San Francisco charging that the San Francisco group was in violation of trademark and copyright by using the Greenpeace name without permission of the Greenpeace Foundation.

The lawsuit was settled at a meeting on October 10, 1979, in the offices of lawyer David Gibbons in Vancouver. Attending were Moore, Hunter, David McTaggart, Rex Weyler, and about six others. At this meeting it was agreed that Greenpeace International would be created. This meant that Greenpeace would remain a single organization rather than an amorphous collection of individual offices. McTaggart, who had come to represent all the other Greenpeace groups against the Greenpeace Foundation, was named chairman. Moore became president of Greenpeace Canada (the new name for Greenpeace Foundation) and a director of Greenpeace International. Other directors were appointed from the US, France, the UK, and the Netherlands. He served for nine years as president of Greenpeace Canada, as well as six years as a director of Greenpeace International.

In 1985, Moore was on board the Rainbow Warrior when it was bombed and sunk by the French government.

=== After Greenpeace ===
In 1986, after leaving Greenpeace over differences in policy, Moore established Quatsino Seafarms—a family salmon farming business at his home in Winter Harbour—and became a director of the BC Salmon Farmers Association. He later commented that he left Greenpeace because it "took a sharp turn to the political left" and "evolved into an organization of extremism and politically motivated agendas".

From 1990 to 1994 he was a member of the British Columbia Round Table on the Environment and the Economy and founded and chaired the B.C. Carbon Project. In 1991, he joined the board of the Forest Alliance of BC, an initiative of the CEOs of the major forest companies in British Columbia. As chair of the Sustainable Forestry Committee of the Forest Alliance he spent ten years developing the Principles of Sustainable Forestry, which were later adopted by much of the industry. In 1991, Moore also founded Greenspirit to "promote sustainable development from a scientific environmental platform". In 2002, Tom Tevlin and Trevor Figueiredo joined Moore to form the environmental consultancy company Greenspirit Strategies Ltd.

Moore served for four years as vice president of environment for Waterfurnace International manufacturing geothermal heat pumps. In 2000, Moore published Green Spirit — Trees are the Answer, a photo-book on forests and the role they can play in solving some current environmental problems. He also made two appearances on Penn & Teller: Bullshit! in episodes Environmental Hysteria (2003) and Endangered Species (2005). In 2006, Moore became co-chair (with Christine Todd Whitman) of a new industry-funded initiative, the Clean and Safe Energy Coalition, which promotes increased use of nuclear energy. In 2010, Moore was recruited to represent the Indonesian logging firm Asia Pulp & Paper (APP), a multi-national accused by activist groups of widespread and illegal rainforest clearance practices, although this is strongly disputed by Moore.

Moore is a policy advisor on climate and energy at The Heartland Institute (a conservative and libertarian think tank).

In the ongoing dispute between Moore and Greenpeace, the group continued to distance itself from Moore and his claims and views, including his denial of climate change.

== Views ==
In 2005, Moore criticized what he said were scare tactics and disinformation employed by some within the environmental movement, saying that the environmental movement "abandoned science and logic in favour of emotion and sensationalism". Moore contends that "most of the really serious [environmental] problems have been dealt with", and that the environmental movement seeks to "invent doom and gloom scenarios". He suggests they romanticize peasant life as part of an anti-industrial campaign to prevent development in less-developed countries, which he describes as "anti-human". Moore was interviewed in the 2007 film documentary The Great Global Warming Swindle, in which he expressed similar views. In 2007 The Guardian said "he is on record advocating the felling of tropical rainforests and the planting of genetically engineered crops". He has expressed his positive views of logging on the Greenspirit website.

=== Energy ===
Moore was opposed to nuclear power in the 1970s, when he "believed that nuclear energy was synonymous with nuclear holocaust" and "everything nuclear was evil", but has since come to be in favour of it.

Moore co-chaired the Clean and Safe Energy Coalition, which was supported by the Nuclear Energy Institute, a national organization of pro-nuclear industries. In 2009, as co-chair of the Coalition, he suggested that the mainstream media and the environmentalist movement are not as opposed to nuclear energy as in decades past.

He argues that any realistic plan to reduce reliance on fossil fuels or greenhouse gas emissions would require increased use of nuclear energy to supply baseload power. He has also criticized the costs and reliability of wind farms.

=== Global climate change denial ===
In 2006, he disagreed with the scientific consensus on climate change in a letter to the Royal Society, arguing there was "no scientific proof" that mankind was causing global climate change and believes that it "has a much better correlation with changes in solar activity than CO_{2} levels". He has falsely claimed that the "scientific method has not been applied in such a way as to prove that carbon dioxide is causing the Earth to warm".

Moore has stated that global climate change and the melting of glaciers is not necessarily a negative event because it creates more arable land and the use of forest products drives up demand for wood and spurs the planting of more trees. Rather than climate change mitigation, Moore advocates adaptation to global warming. This, too, is contrary to the general scientific consensus, which expects climate change to lead to some irreversible impacts.

A March 2014 episode of the American program Hannity featured Moore making the statement that the Earth "has not warmed for the last 17 years" in a debate with pundit Bob Beckel. Politifact, a political fact checking website operated by the Tampa Bay Times, rated Moore's assertion "mostly false", remarking that a significant net warming over that time frame had occurred even though the spread was relatively flat as well as that Moore cherry-picked the time frame to obscure the overall heating trend.

In March 2019, Donald Trump tweeted about an interview Moore gave on the Fox News program Fox & Friends, where he denied that climate change was a threat and suggested that global warming might be beneficial as carbon dioxide is a "building block of life".

=== Attacks on Alexandria Ocasio-Cortez and Greta Thunberg ===
Moore called Democratic Congresswoman Alexandria Ocasio-Cortez a "twit" in the Fox News interview opposing her Green New Deal, a resolution aiming to reduce carbon emissions and mitigate the impact of climate change in the US.

Moore has also personally attacked climate change activist Greta Thunberg. He claimed she were "evil", described her as a "puppet" with a mental disorder, compared the individuals he alleged are controlling her to "Hitler", and accused her parents of abusing her.

=== Genetically modified foods ===
In 2006, Moore addressed a Biotechnology Industry Organization conference in Waikiki saying, "There's no getting away from the fact that over 6 billion people wake up each day on this planet with real needs for food, energy and materials", and need genetically engineered crops to this end.

Moore supports the adoption of golden rice to prevent vitamin A deficiency.

== Criticism ==
Moore has earned his living since the early 1990s primarily by consulting for, and publicly speaking for, a wide variety of corporations and lobby groups such as the Nuclear Energy Institute. Moore's work as a lobbyist has prompted criticism from environmental activists, who have accused him of acting as an advocate for many of the industries that Greenpeace was founded to counter. His critics point out Moore's business relations with "polluters and clear-cutters" through his consultancy. Monte Hummel, president of the World Wildlife Fund Canada, has claimed that Moore's book Pacific Spirit is a collection of "pseudoscience and dubious assumptions".

The writer and environmental activist George Monbiot has written critically of Moore's work with the Indonesian logging firm Asia Pulp & Paper (APP). Moore was hired as a consultant to write an environmental 'inspection report' on APP operations. According to Monbiot, Moore's company is not a monitoring firm and the consultants used were experts in public relations, not tropical ecology or Indonesian law. Monbiot has said that sections of the report were directly copied from an APP PR brochure.

The Nuclear Information and Resource Service, an anti-nuclear group, criticized Moore, saying that his comment in 1976 that "it should be remembered that there are employed in the nuclear industry some very high-powered public relations organizations. One can no more trust them to tell the truth about nuclear power than about which brand of toothpaste will result in this apparently insoluble problem" was seen as forecasting his own future. A Columbia Journalism Review editorial criticizes the press for uncritically printing "pro-nuclear songs" such as Moore's, citing his role as a paid spokesperson of the nuclear industry.

During an interview by French investigative journalist Paul Moreira, which was first broadcast on French television station Canal+, Moore was asked about the safety of the herbicide glyphosate. Moore told Moreira that one "could drink a whole quart of it" without any harm. When Moore was challenged to drink a glass of the weedkiller, he refused, saying "I'm not an idiot" and "I'm not stupid" before ending the interview. Monsanto, the primary producers of glyphosate weedkillers under the Roundup brand, denied claims that Moore is a paid lobbyist for their company. The interview came shortly after the release of a World Health Organization (WHO) report adding glyphosate to a list of probable carcinogens.

== Bibliography ==
- Moore, Patrick (1995) Pacific Spirit: The Forest Reborn. Terra Bella Publishers Canada. ISBN 1-896171-07-9
- Moore, Patrick (2000) Green Spirit: Trees are the Answer. Greenspirit Enterprises. ISBN 0-9686404-0-0
- Moore, Patrick (2010) Trees are the Answer, 10th Anniversary Edition. Beatty Street Publishing Inc. ISBN 978-0-9864808-0-5
- Moore, Patrick (2011) Confessions of a Greenpeace Dropout: The Making of a Sensible Environmentalist. Beatty Street Publishing Inc. ISBN 978-0-9864808-2-9
- Moore, Patrick (2021) Fake Invisible Catastrophes and Threats of Doom. Comox, BC: Ecosense Environmental Inc. ISBN 9798568595502
