= Mycorrhizal network =

Underground fungal networks that connect individual plants together

Nutrient exchanges and communication between a mycorrhizal fungus and plants

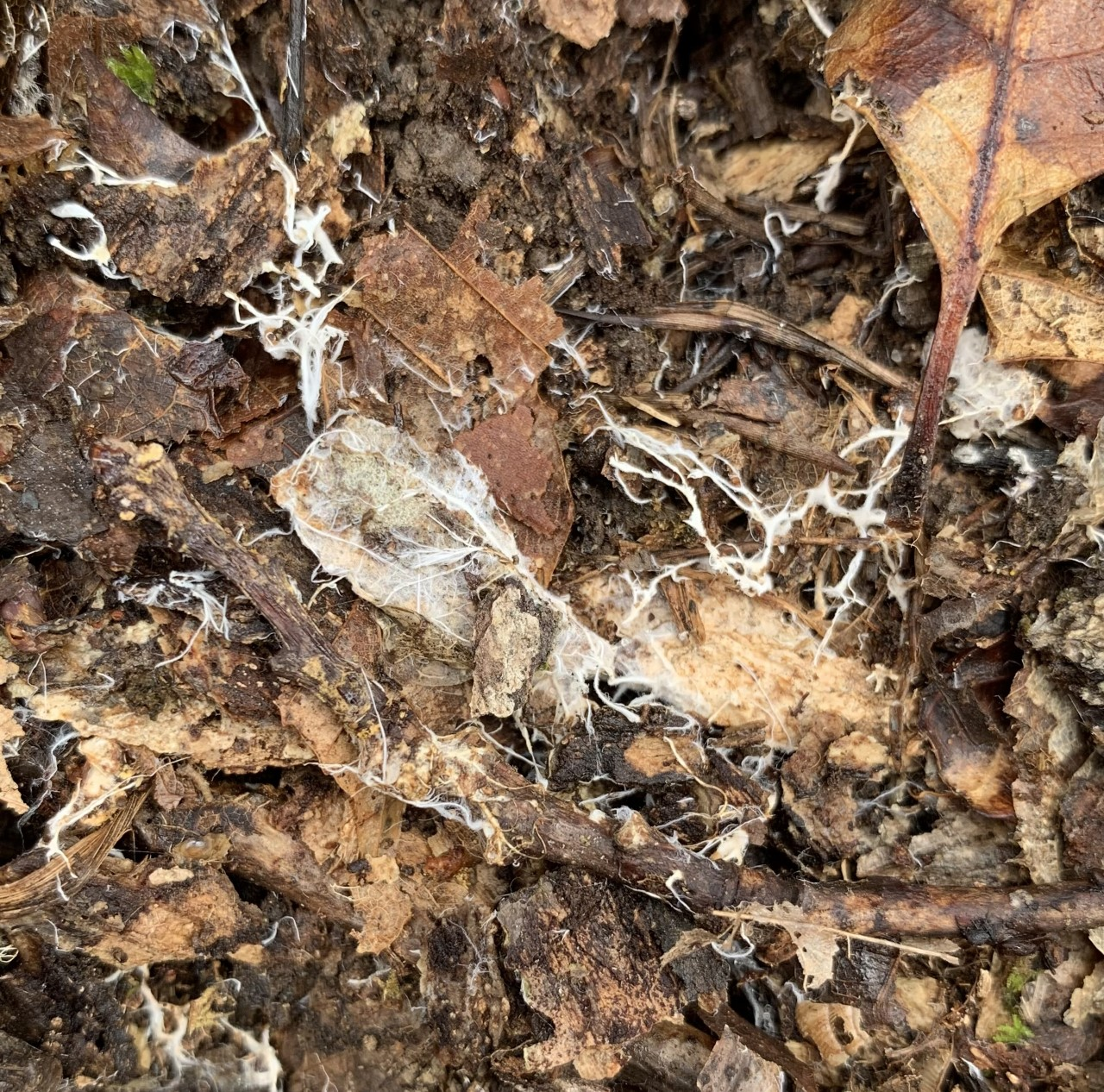
White threads of fungal mycelium are sometimes visible underneath leaf litter in a forest floor.

A mycorrhizal network (also known as a common mycorrhizal network or CMN) is an underground network found in forests and other plant communities, created by the hyphae of mycorrhizal fungi joining with plant roots. This network connects individual plants together. Mycorrhizal relationships are most commonly mutualistic, with both partners benefiting, but can be commensal or parasitic, and a single partnership may change between any of the three types of symbiosis at different times. Mycorrhizal networks were discovered in 1997 by Suzanne Simard, professor of forest ecology at the University of British Columbia in Canada. Simard grew up in Canadian forests where her family had made a living as foresters for generations. Her field studies revealed that trees are linked to neighboring trees by an underground network of fungi that resembles the neural networks in the brain. In one study, Simard watched as a Douglas fir that had been injured by insects appeared to send chemical warning signals to a ponderosa pine growing nearby. The pine tree then produced defense enzymes to protect against the insect.

The formation and nature of these networks is context-dependent, and can be influenced by factors such as soil fertility, resource availability, host or mycosymbiont genotype, disturbance and seasonal variation. Some plant species, such as buckhorn plantain, a common lawn and agricultural weed, benefit from mycorrhizal relationships in conditions of low soil fertility, but are harmed in higher soil fertility. Both plants and fungi associate with multiple symbiotic partners at once, and both plants and fungi are capable of preferentially allocating resources to one partner over another.

Mycorrhizal associations have profoundly impacted the evolution of plant life on Earth ever since the initial adaptation of plant life to land. In evolutionary biology, mycorrhizal symbiosis has prompted inquiries into the possibility that symbiosis, not competition, is the main driver of evolution.

Referencing an analogous function served by the World Wide Web in human communities, the many roles that mycorrhizal networks appear to play in woodland have earned them a colloquial nickname: the "Wood Wide Web". Many of the claims made about common mycorrhizal networks, including that they are ubiquitous in forests, that resources are transferred between plants through them, and that they are used to transfer warnings between trees, have been criticised as being not strongly supported by evidence.

== Definitions and types ==
As a scientific term, mycorrhizal network has broad meanings and usage. Scientific understandings and thus publications utilize more specific definitions arising from the term common mycorrhizal network (CMN). The keyword "common" requires that two or more individual plants are connected by the same underground fungal network, through which matter of various types and functions may flow. The plants themselves may be individuals of the same or different species. In turn, the fungal network that is composed of threadlike hyphae may be limited to a single type or entail several. The kinds of evidence deemed necessary for supporting scientific conclusions, along with the tendency for disputes to arise, depend in part on the definitions used.

There are two main types of mycorrhizal networks. These are determined by the two main categories of fungal growth forms. Arbuscular mycorrhizal networks are those in which fungal hyphae not only enter the plant's roots but also penetrate into the cells themselves. Ectomycorrhizal networks send hyphae into the roots where they thread their way between the plant cells but do not penetrate cell walls. The arbuscular type is the most common among land plants and is regarded as the ancestral type. However, tree species comprising the canopy of temperate and especially boreal forests in the Northern Hemisphere tend to associate with ectomycorrhizal fungi.

Plant and fungal partners within a network may enact a variety of symbiotic relationships. Earliest attention was given to mutualistic networks by which the plant and fungal partners both benefit. Commensal and parasitic relationships are also found in mycorrhizal networks. A single partnership may change between any of the three types at different times.

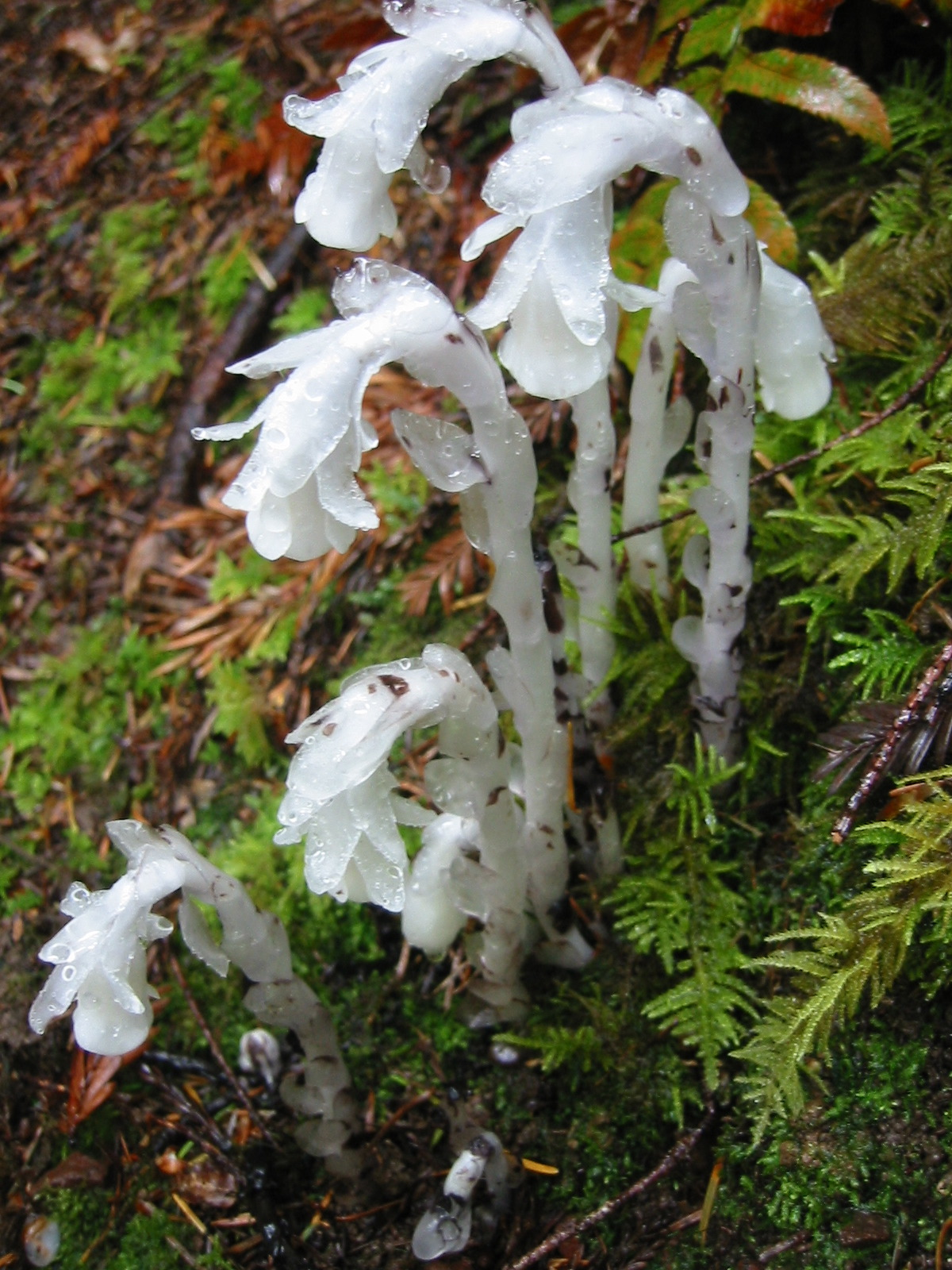
Monotropa plant unable to photosynthesise, collects food from monotropoid mycorrhiza. see also Myco-heterotrophy

== Knowns, unknowns, and controversies ==
The mycorrhizal symbiosis between plants and fungi is fundamental to terrestrial ecosystems, with evolutionary origins before the colonization of land by plants. In the mycorrhizal symbiosis, a plant and a fungus become physically linked to one another and establish an exchange of resources between one another. The plant provides to the fungus up to 30% of the carbon it fixes by photosynthesis, while the fungus provides the plant with nutrients that are limiting in terrestrial environments, such as nitrogen and phosphorus.

As this relationship has been better investigated and understood by science, interest has emerged in its potential influence on interactions between different plants, particularly in the possibility that connectivity through the mycorrhizal network may allow plants to positively impact the survival of other plants. Evidence and potential mechanisms for a variety of plant-plant interactions mediated by the mycorrhizal symbiosis have been presented, but their validity and significance is still controversial.

=== Proposed effects and functions of the mycorrhizal network ===
==== Potential nutrient and photosynthate transfer between plants ====
Since multiple plants can be simultaneously colonized by the same fungus, there has been interest in the possibility that inter-plant transfer of nutrients may occur via mycorrhizal networks, with photosynthates moving from a 'donor' plant to a 'recipient' plant. Numerous studies have reported that carbon, nitrogen and phosphorus are transferred between conspecific and heterospecific plants via AM and ECM networks. Other nutrients may also be transferred, as strontium and rubidium, which are calcium and potassium analogs respectively, have also been reported to move via an AM network between conspecific plants. It is possible that in this way, mycorrhizal networks could alter the behavior of receiving plants by inducing physiological or biochemical changes, and there is evidence that these changes have improved nutrition, growth and survival of receiving plants.

==== Potential signaling and communication between plants ====
Reports discuss the ongoing debate within the scientific community regarding what constitutes communication, but the extent of communication influences how a biologist perceives behaviors. Communication is commonly defined as imparting or exchanging information. Biological communication, however, is often defined by how fitness in an organism is affected by the transfer of information in both the sender and the receiver. Signals are the result of evolved behavior in the sender and effect a change in the receiver by imparting information about the sender's environment. Cues are similar in origin but only effect the fitness of the receiver. Both signals and cues are important elements of communication, but workers maintain caution as to when it can be determined that transfer of information benefits both senders and receivers. Thus, the extent of biological communication can be in question without rigorous experimentation. It has, therefore, been suggested that the term infochemical be used for chemical substances which can travel from one organism to another and elicit changes. This is important to understanding biological communication where it is not clearly delineated that communication involves a signal that can be adaptive to both sender and receiver.

==== Behavior and information transfer ====
A morphological or physiological change in a plant due to a signal or cue from its environment constitutes behavior in plants, and plants connected by a mycorrhizal network have the ability to alter their behavior based on the signals or cues they receive from other plants. These signals or cues can be biochemical, electrical, or can involve nutrient transfer. Plants release chemicals both above and below the ground to communicate with their neighbors to reduce damage from their environment. Changes in plant behavior invoked by the transfer of infochemicals vary depending on environmental factors, the types of plants involved and the type of mycorrhizal network. In a study of trifoliate orange seedlings, mycorrhizal networks acted to transfer infochemicals, and the presence of a mycorrhizal network affected the growth of plants and enhanced production of signaling molecules. One argument in support of the claim mycorrhizal can transfer various infochemicals is that they have been shown to transfer molecules such as lipids, carbohydrates and amino acids. Thus, transfer of infochemicals via mycorrhizal networks can act to influence plant behavior.

There are three main types of infochemicals shown to act as response inducing signals or cues by plants in mycorrhizal networks, as evidenced by increased effects on plant behavior: allelochemicals, defensive chemicals and nutrients.

==== Allelopathic communication ====
Allelopathy is the process by which plants produce secondary metabolites known as allelochemicals, which can interfere with the development of other plants or organisms. Allelochemicals can affect nutrient uptake, photosynthesis and growth; furthermore, they can down regulate defense genes, affect mitochondrial function, and disrupt membrane permeability leading to issues with respiration.

Plants produce many types of allelochemicals, such as thiophenes and juglone, which can be volatilized or exuded by the roots into the rhizosphere. Plants release allelochemicals due to biotic and abiotic stresses in their environment and often release them in conjunction with defensive compounds. In order for allelochemicals to have a detrimental effect on a target plant, they must exist in high enough concentrations to be toxic, but, much like animal pheromones, allelochemicals are released in very small amounts and rely on the reaction of the target plant to amplify their effects. Due to their lower concentrations and the ease in which they are degraded in the environment, the toxicity of allelochemicals is limited by soil moisture, soil structure, and organic matter types and microbes present in soils. The effectiveness of allelopathic interactions has been called into question in native habitats due to the effects of them passing through soils, but studies have shown that mycorrhizal networks make their transfer more efficient. These infochemicals are hypothesized to be able to travel faster via mycorrhizal networks, because the networks protect them from some hazards of being transmitted through the soil, such as leaching and degradation. This increased transfer speed is hypothesized to occur if the allelochemicals move via water on hyphal surfaces or by cytoplasmic streaming. Studies have reported concentrations of allelochemicals two to four times higher in plants connected by mycorrhizal networks. Thus, mycorrhizal networks can facilitate the transfer of these infochemicals.

Studies have demonstrated correlations between increased levels of allelochemicals in target plants and the presence of mycorrhizal networks. These studies strongly suggest that mycorrhizal networks increase the transfer of allelopathic chemicals and expand the range, called the bioactive zone, in which they can disperse and maintain their function. Furthermore, studies indicate increased bioactive zones aid in the effectiveness of the allelochemicals because these infochemicals cannot travel very far without a mycorrhizal network. There was greater accumulation of allelochemicals, such as thiopenes and the herbicide imazamox, in target plants connected to a supplier plant via a mycorrhizal network than without that connection, supporting the conclusion that the mycorrhizal network increased the bioactive zone of the allelochemical. Allelopathic chemicals have also been demonstrated to inhibit target plant growth when target and supplier are connected via AM networks. The black walnut is one of the earliest studied examples of allelopathy and produces juglone, which inhibits growth and water uptake in neighboring plants. In studies of juglone in black walnuts and their target species, the presence of mycorrhizal networks caused target plants to exhibit reduced growth by increasing the transfer of the infochemical. Spotted knapweed, an allelopathic invasive species, provides further evidence of the ability of mycorrhizal networks to contribute to the transfer of allelochemicals. Spotted knapweed can alter which plant species a certain AM fungus prefers to connect to, changing the structure of the network so that the invasive plant shares a network with its target. These and other studies provide evidence that mycorrhizal networks can facilitate the effects on plant behavior caused by allelochemicals.

==== Defensive communication ====
Mycorrhizal networks can connect many different plants and provide shared pathways by which plants can transfer infochemicals related to attacks by pathogens or herbivores, allowing receiving plants to react in the same way as the infected or infested plants. A variety of plant derived substances act as these infochemicals.

When plants are attacked they can manifest physical changes, such as strengthening their cell walls, depositing callose, or forming cork. They can also manifest biochemical changes, including the production of volatile organic compounds (VOCs) or the upregulation of genes producing other defensive enzymes, many of which are toxic to pathogens or herbivores. Salicylic acid (SA) and its derivatives, like methyl salicylate, are VOCs which help plants to recognize infection or attack and to organize other plant defenses, and exposure to them in animals can cause pathological processes. Terpenoids are produced constituently in many plants or are produced as a response to stress and act much like methyl salicylate. Jasmonates are a class of VOCs produced by the jasmonic acid (JA) pathway. Jasmonates are used in plant defense against insects and pathogens and can cause the expression of proteases, which defend against insect attack. Plants have many ways to react to attack, including the production of VOCs, which studies report can coordinate defenses among plants connected by mycorrhizal networks.

Many studies report that mycorrhizal networks facilitate the coordination of defenses between connected plants using volatile organic compounds and other plant defensive enzymes acting as infochemicals.

Priming occurs when a plant's defenses are activated before an attack. Studies have shown that priming of plant defenses among plants in mycorrhizal networks may be activated by the networks, as they make it easier for these infochemicals to propagate among the connected plants. The defenses of uninfected plants are primed by their response via the network to the terpenoids produced by the infected plants. AM networks can prime plant defensive reactions by causing them to increase the production of terpenoids.

In a study of tomato plants connected via an AM mycorrhizal network, a plant not infected by a fungal pathogen showed evidence of defensive priming when another plant in the network was infected, causing the uninfected plant to upregulate genes for the SA and JA pathways. Similarly, aphid-free plants were shown to only be able to express the SA pathways when a mycorrhizal network connected them to infested plants. Furthermore, only then did they display resistance to the herbivore, showing that the plants were able to transfer defensive infochemicals via the mycorrhizal network.

Many insect herbivores are drawn to their food by VOCs. When the plant is consumed, however, the composition of the VOCs change, which can then cause them to repel the herbivores and attract insect predators, such as parasitoid wasps. Methyl salicylate was shown to be the primary VOC produced by beans in a study which demonstrated this effect. It was found to be in high concentrations in infested and uninfested plants, which were only connected via a mycorrhizal network. A plant sharing a mycorrhizal network with another that is attacked will display similar defensive strategies, and its defenses will be primed to increase the production of toxins or chemicals which repel attackers or attract defensive species.

In another study, introduction of budworm to Douglas fir trees led to increased production of defensive enzymes in uninfested ponderosa pines connected to the damaged tree by an ECM network. This effect demonstrates that defensive infochemicals transferred through such a network can cause rapid increases in resistance and defense in uninfested plants of a different species.

The results of these studies support the conclusion that both ECM and AM networks provide pathways for defensive infochemicals from infected or infested hosts to induce defensive changes in uninfected or uninfested conspecific and heterospecific plants, and that some recipient species generally receive less damage from infestation or infection.

=== Limits and challenges to research ===
Because natural environments contain many different plant and fungal species as well as various other biotic and abiotic factors interacting with one another, it is difficult to verify the effect of interactions occurring via the mycorrhizal network in a field setting. On the other hand, controlled experiments that isolate simple interactions between a few species do not replicate anything found in nature. In a natural ecosystem, plants simultaneously participate in symbiotic relationships with multiple fungi, and some of these relationships may be commensal or parasitic. The connectivity between plants believed to share a common mycorrhizal network is also difficult to verify in a natural ecosystem. Field observations cannot easily rule out the possibility that effects attributed to physical connection between plants via mycorrhizal networks could be happening due to other interactions.

While movement of resources between plants connected to the same mycorrhizal network has been shown, it is often unclear whether the transfer is direct, as though the mycelium is forming a literal "pipeline," or indirect, such as nutrients being released into the soil by fungi and then picked up by neighboring plants. It is furthermore unclear whether apparent nutrient transfer between plants has a significant impact on plant fitness.

=== Research tools and methods ===
==== Isotopic labeling ====
Carbon transfer has been demonstrated by experiments using carbon-14 (^{14}C) isotopic labeling and following the pathway from ectomycorrhizal conifer seedlings to another using mycorrhizal networks. The experiment showed a bidirectional movement of the ^{14}C within ectomycorrhizal species. Further investigation of bidirectional movement and the net transfer was analyzed using pulse labeling technique with ^{13}C and ^{14}C in ectomycorrhizal Douglas fir and Betula payrifera seedlings. Results displayed an overall net balance of carbon transfer between the two, until the second year where the Douglas fir received carbon from B. payrifera. Detection of the isotopes was found in receiver plant shoots, expressing carbon transfer from fungus to plant tissues.

Plants sense carbon through a receptor in their guard cells that measure carbon dioxide concentrations in the leaf and environment. Carbon information is integrated using proteins known as carbonic anhydrases, in which the plant then responds by utilizing or disregarding the carbon resources from the mycorrhizal networks. One case study follows a CMN shared by a paper birch and Douglas fir tree. By using carbon-13 and carbon-14 labels, researchers found that both tree species were trading carbon–that is to say, carbon was moving from tree to tree in both directions. The rate of carbon transfer varied based on the physiological factors such as total biomass, age, nutrient status, and photosynthetic rate. At the end of the experiment, the Douglas fir was found to have a 2% to 3% net gain in carbon. This gain may seem small, but in the past a carbon gain of less than 1% has been shown to coincide with a four-fold increase in the establishment of new seedlings. Both plants showed a threefold increase in carbon received from the CMN when compared to the soil pathway.

=== Proposed models ===
Several models have been proposed to explain the movement of nutrients between plants connected by a mycorrhizal network, including source-sink relationships, "market" analogies, preferential transfer and kin related mechanisms.

==== Source-sink model ====
Transfer of nutrients can follow a source–sink relationship where nutrients move from areas of higher concentration to areas of lower concentration. An experiment with grasses and forbs from a California oak woodland showed that nutrients were transferred between plant species via an AM mycorrhizal network, with different species acting as sources and sinks for different elements. Nitrogen has also been shown to flow from nitrogen-fixing plants to non-nitrogen fixing plants through a mycorrhizal network following a source-sink relationship.

The direction carbon resources flow through the mycorrhizal network has been observed to shift seasonally, with carbon flowing toward the parts of the network that need it the most. For example, in a network that includes Acer saccharinum (sugar maple) and Erythronium americanum (trout lily), carbon moves to young sugar maple saplings in spring when leaves are unfurling, and shifts to move to the trout lilies in fall when the lilies are developing their roots. A further study with paper birch and Douglas fir demonstrated that the flow of carbon shifts direction more than once per season: in spring, newly budding birch receives carbon from green Douglas fir, in summer, stressed Douglas fir in the forest understory receives carbon from birch in full leaf, and in fall, birch again receives carbon from Douglas fir as birch trees shed their leaves and evergreen Douglas firs continue photosynthesizing.

When the ectomycorrhizal fungus-receiving end of the plant has limited sunlight availability, there was an increase in carbon transfer, indicating a source–sink gradient of carbon among plants and shade surface area regulates carbon transfer.

It has been demonstrated that mechanisms exist by which mycorrhizal fungi can preferentially allocate nutrients to certain plants without a source–sink relationship. Studies have also detailed bidirectional transfer of nutrients between plants connected by a network, and evidence indicates that carbon can be shared between plants unequally, sometimes to the benefit of one species over another.

Kinship can act as another transfer mechanism. More carbon has been found to be exchanged between the roots of more closely related Douglas firs sharing a network than more distantly related roots. Evidence is also mounting that micronutrients transferred via mycorrhizal networks can communicate relatedness between plants. Carbon transfer between Douglas fir seedlings led workers to hypothesize that micronutrient transfer via the network may have increased carbon transfer between related plants.

These transfer mechanisms can facilitate movement of nutrients via mycorrhizal networks and result in behavioral modifications in connected plants, as indicated by morphological or physiological changes, due to the infochemicals being transmitted. One study reported a threefold increase in photosynthesis in a paper birch transferring carbon to a Douglas fir, indicating a physiological change in the tree which produced the signal. Photosynthesis was also shown to be increased in Douglas fir seedlings by the transport of carbon, nitrogen and water from an older tree connected by a mycorrhizal network. Furthermore, nutrient transfer from older to younger trees on a network can dramatically increase growth rates of the younger receivers. Physiological changes due to environmental stress have also initiated nutrient transfer by causing the movement of carbon from the roots of the stressed plant to the roots of a conspecific plant over a mycorrhizal network. Thus, nutrients transferred through mychorrhizal networks act as signals and cues to change the behavior of the connected plants.

=== Evolutionary and adaptational perspectives ===
Several positive effects of mycorrhizal networks on plants have been reported. These include increased establishment success, higher growth rate and survivorship of seedlings; improved inoculum availability for mycorrhizal infection; transfer of water, carbon, nitrogen and other limiting resources increasing the probability for colonization in less favorable conditions. These benefits have also been identified as the primary drivers of positive interactions and feedbacks between plants and mycorrhizal fungi that influence plant species abundance.

The formation and nature of these networks is context-dependent, and can be influenced by factors such as soil fertility, resource availability, host or mycosymbiont genotype, disturbance and seasonal variation. Some plant species, such as buckhorn plantain, a common lawn and agricultural weed, benefit from mycorrhizal relationships in conditions of low soil fertility, but are harmed in higher soil fertility. Both plants and fungi associate with multiple symbiotic partners at once, and both plants and fungi are capable of preferentially allocating resources to one partner over another.

It is hypothesized that fitness is improved by the transfer of infochemicals through common mycorrhizal networks, as these signals and cues can induce responses which can help the receiver survive in its environment. Plants and fungus have evolved heritable genetic traits which influence their interactions with each other, and experiments, such as one which revealed the heritability of mycorrhizal colonization in cowpeas, provide evidence. Furthermore, changes in behavior of one partner in a mycorrhizal network can affect others in the network; thus, the mycorrhizal network can provide selective pressure to increase the fitness of its members.

==== Adaptive mechanisms ====
Although they remain to be vigorously demonstrated, researchers have suggested mechanisms which might explain how transfer of infochemicals via mycorrhizal networks may influence the fitness of the connected plants and fungi.

A fungus may preferentially allocate carbon and defensive infochemicals to plants that supply it more carbon, as this would help to maximize its carbon uptake. This may happen in ecosystems where environmental stresses, such as climate change, cause fluctuations in the types of plants in the mycorrhizal network. A fungus might also benefit its own survival by taking carbon from one host with a surplus and giving it to another in need, thus it would ensure the survival of more potential hosts and leave itself with more carbon sources should a particular host species suffer. Thus, preferential transfer could improve fungal fitness.

Plant fitness may also be increased in several ways. Relatedness may be a factor, as plants in a network are more likely to be related; therefore, kin selection might improve inclusive fitness and explain why a plant might support a fungus that helps other plants to acquire nutrients. Receipt of defensive signals or cues from an infested plant would be adaptive, as the receiving plant would be able to prime its own defenses in advance of an attack by herbivores. Allelopathic chemicals transferred via CMNs could also affect which plants are selected for survival by limiting the growth of competitors through a reduction of their access to nutrients and light. Therefore, transfer of the different classes of infochemicals might prove adaptive for plants.

==== Seedling establishment ====
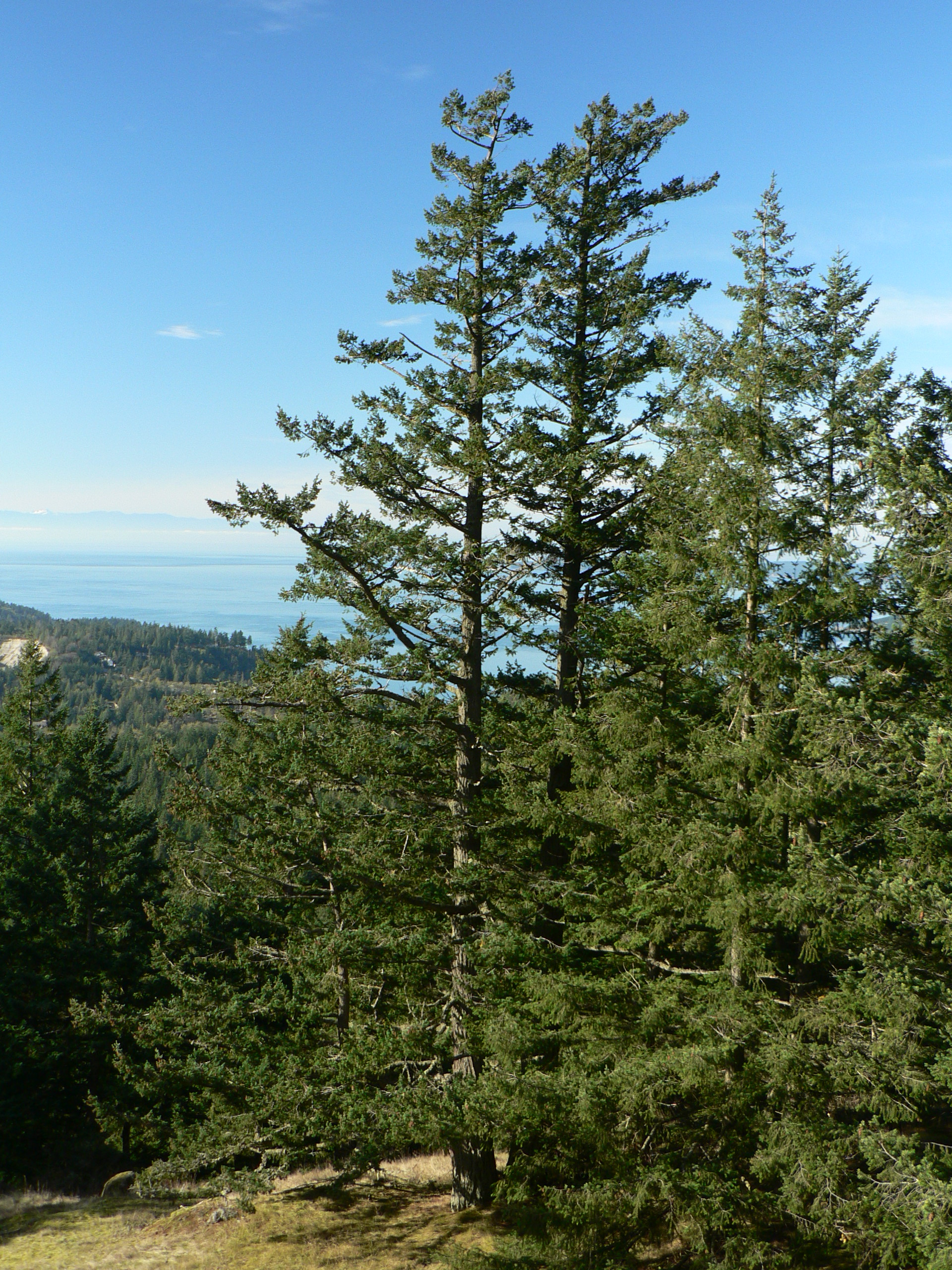
Mature Douglas fir

Seedling establishment research often is focused on forest level communities with similar fungal species. However mycorrhizal networks may shift intraspecific and interspecific interactions that may alter preestablished plants' physiology. Shifting competition can alter the evenness and dominance of the plant community. Discovery of seedling establishment showed seedling preference is near existing plants of conspecific or heterospecific species and seedling amount is abundant. Many believe the process of new seedlings becoming infected with existing mycorrhizae expedite their establishment within the community. The seedling inherit tremendous benefits from their new formed symbiotic relation with the fungi. The new influx of nutrients and water availability, help the seedling with growth but more importantly help ensure survival when in a stressed state. Mycorrhizal networks aid in regeneration of seedlings when secondary succession occurs, seen in temperate and boreal forests. Seedling benefits from infecting mycorrhizae include increased infectivity range of diverse mycorrhizal fungi, increased carbon inputs from mycorrhizal networks with other plants, increased area meaning greater access to nutrients and water, and increased exchange rates of nutrients and water from other plants.

Several studies have focused on relationships between mycorrhizal networks and plants, specifically their performance and establishment rate. Douglas fir seedlings' growth expanded when planted with hardwood trees compared to unamended soils in the mountains of Oregon. Douglas firs had higher rates of ectomycorrhizal fungal diversity, richness, and photosynthetic rates when planted alongside root systems of mature Douglas firs and Betula papyrifera than compared to those seedlings who exhibited no or little growth when isolated from mature trees. The Douglas fir was the focus of another study to understand its preference for establishing in an ecosystem. Two shrub species, Arctostaphylos and Adenostoma both had the opportunity to colonize the seedlings with their ectomycorrhizae fungi. Arctostaphylos shrubs colonized Douglas fir seedlings who also had higher survival rates. The mycorrhizae joining the pair had greater net carbon transfer toward the seedling. The researchers were able to minimize environmental factors they encountered in order to avoid swaying readers in opposite directions.

In burned and salvaged forest, Quercus rubrum establishment was facilitated when acorns were planted near Q. montana but did not grow when near arbuscular mycorrhizae Acer rubrum Seedlings deposited near Q. montana had a greater diversity of ectomycorrhizal fungi, and a more significant net transfer of nitrogen and phosphorus content, demonstrating that ectomycorrhizal fungi formation with the seedling helped with their establishment. Results demonstrated with increasing density; mycorrhizal benefits decrease due to an abundance of resources that overwhelmed their system resulting in little growth as seen in Q. rubrum.

Mycorrhizal networks decline with increasing distance from parents, but the rate of survival was unaffected. This indicated that seedling survival has a positive relation with decreasing competition as networks move out farther.

One study displayed the effects of ectomycorrhizal networks in plants which face primary succession. In an experiment, Nara (2006) transplanted Salix reinii seedlings inoculated with different ectomycorrhizal species. It was found that mycorrhizal networks are the connection of ectomycorrhizal fungi colonization and plant establishment. Results showed increased biomass and survival of germinates near the inoculated seedlings compared to inoculated seedlings.

Studies have found that association with mature plants correlates with higher survival of the plant and greater diversity and species richness of the mycorrhizal fungi.

==== Mycorrhizal mapping ====
Using more than 2.8 billion fungal sequences sampled from 130 countries, in 2025 the Society for the Protection of Underground Networks (SPUN) released the world's first high-resolution, predictive biodiversity maps of Earth's underground mycorrhizal fungal communities. The mycorrhizal biodiversity map is called the Underground Atlas. The data reveal that "over 90% of Earth's most diverse underground mycorrhizal fungal ecosystems remain unprotected, threatening carbon drawdown, crop productivity, and ecosystem resilience to climate extremes."

== See also ==
- Suzanne Simard
- "Finding the Mother Tree" (book)
- "Entangled Life" (book)
- Forest ecology
- Plant communication
- Society for the Protection of Underground Networks (SPUN) (advocacy)
