= Mark Bertness =

American ecologist

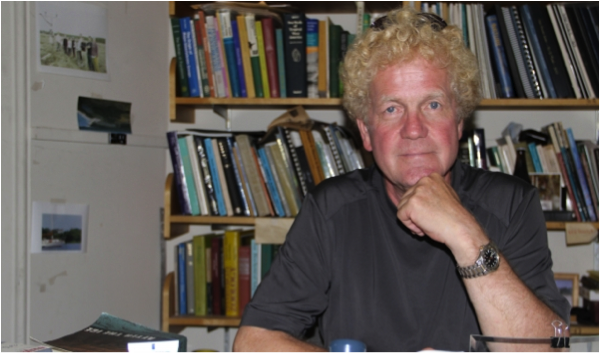
- Born: July 13, 1949 (age 77)

Academic background
- Education: University of Puget Sound; Western Washington University; University of Maryland, College Park

Academic work
- Institutions: Brown University

Mark D. Bertness (born July 13, 1949) is an American ecologist, known for his work on the community assembly of marine shoreline communities.

Among his important work are the Stress Gradient Hypothesis (Bertness and Callaway 1994) that predicts that positive species interactions are more important in biologically and physically stressful habitats than in biologically and physically benign habitats, his experimental research in a variety of marine intertidal communities elucidating the roles of biotic interaction across intertidal gradients (Bertness and Hacker 1994, Bertness et al. 1999, Bertness 1999), his pioneering of experimental community ecology in salt marsh ecosystems and his work on apex predator depletion causing die-offs in salt marshes due to the release of herbivores from predator control

Bertness is the Professor Emeritus of Ecology and Evolutionary Biology and former chair of the Department of Ecology and Evolutionary Biology at Brown University. He has had visiting distinguished appointments at Groningen University, the Netherlands, the Catholic University of Santiago, Chile and the University of Sassari, Sardinia, Italy.

In 2002 Bertness has been designated an ISI and Web of Science Highly Cited Researcher in Environmental Science; this indicates that Dr. Bertness was among the 250 most-cited researchers in Environmental Science during a certain period of time. In 2009, Bertness was recognized as a Fellow of the American Association for the Advancement of Science; this fellowship is a recognition of an individual's meritorious efforts to advance science or its applications. Bertness is also a trustee of the Marine Biological Association of the United Kingdom.
