= Forests (journal) =

- Discipline: Forestry, forest ecology, forest management, environmental science
- Language: English
- Edited by: Timothy A. Martin

Publication details
- History: Since 2010
- Publisher: MDPI
- Frequency: Monthly
- Open access: Yes
- License: Creative Commons Attribution License
- Impact factor: 2.5 (2024)

Standard abbreviations
- ISO 4: Forests

Indexing
- ISSN: 1999-4907

Links
- Journal homepage

Forests is a monthly peer-reviewed open-access scientific journal covering research on all aspects of forestry and related fields such as forest ecology and forest management. It is published by MDPI and was established in 2010.

The journal publishes original research articles, reviews, communications, and short notes.

== Abstracting and indexing ==
The journal is abstracted and indexed in, for example:

- Science Citation Index Expanded
- Scopus
- Directory of Open Access Journals
- ProQuest databases

According to the Journal Citation Reports, the journal has a 2024 impact factor of 2.5.
