= Suzanne Simard =

Canadian forest ecologist (born 1960)

Suzanne W. Simard
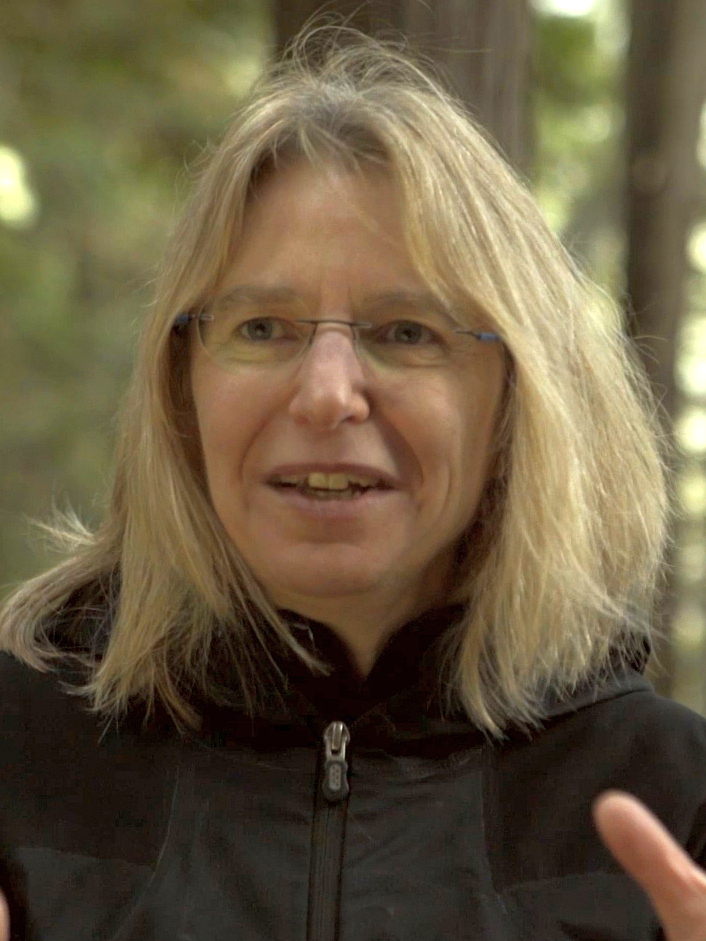
- Simard in 2018
- Education: Oregon State University
- Awards: Sigurd Olson Nature Writing Award (2021); George Lawson Medal (2022)
- Scientific career
- Fields: Forest ecology, mycorrhizal networks
- Workplaces: University of British Columbia
- Thesis: Interspecific Carbon Transfer in Ectomycorrhizal Tree Species Mixtures (1995)
- Doctoral advisor: David A. Perry

Suzanne Simard (born 1960) is a Canadian forestry scientist and conservationist who is best known for her research on forest ecology and plant intelligence.

Simard is a Professor in the Department of Forest and Conservation Sciences at the University of British Columbia. After growing up in the Monashee Mountains, British Columbia, she received her PhD in Forest Sciences at Oregon State University. Prior to working at the University of British Columbia, Simard worked as a research scientist at the British Columbia Ministry of Forests.

Simard is known for the research she conducted on the underground networks of forests characterized by fungi and roots. She studies how these fungi and roots facilitate communication and interaction between trees and plants of an ecosystem. Within the communication between trees and plants is the exchange of carbon, water, nutrients and defense signals between trees. Simard is also a leader of TerreWEB, an initiative set to train graduate students and post-doctoral fellows in global change science and its communication.

She used rare carbon isotopes as tracers in both field and greenhouse experiments to measure the flow and sharing of carbon between individual trees and species, and discovered, for instance, that birch and Douglas fir share carbon. Birch trees receive extra carbon from Douglas firs when the birch trees lose their leaves, and birch trees supply carbon to Douglas fir trees that are in the shade.

== Mother trees ==
Simard identified something called a hub tree, or "mother tree", which tend to be the largest trees in forests that act as central hubs for vast below-ground mycorrhizal networks. A mother tree could support seedlings by infecting them with fungi and supplying them with the nutrients they need to grow.

She discovered that Douglas firs provide carbon to baby firs. She found that there was more carbon sent to baby firs that came from that specific mother tree, than random baby firs not related to that specific fir tree. It was also found that the mother trees change their root structure to make room for baby trees.

Her book Finding the Mother Tree asserts that forest ecologies are interdependent with fungal mycelium. She asserts that trees (and other plants) exchange sugars through their respective root systems and through interconnected fungal mycelial structures to share (and at times trade) micronutrients. This is significant in terms of the way existing woods and forests are managed and new plantations established.

== Interspecies cooperation ==
Simard found that "fir trees were using the fungal web to trade nutrients with paper-bark birch trees over the course of the season". For example, tree species can loan one another sugars as deficits occur within seasonal changes. This is a particularly beneficial exchange between deciduous and coniferous trees as their energy deficits occur during different periods. The benefit "of this cooperative underground economy appears to be better over-all health, more total photosynthesis, and greater resilience in the face of disturbance".

The interspecies cooperation is now criticized, highlighting the low amount of nutrient transfer between species through the mycorrhizal networks. The mother tree theory is also called into question by plant scientists for lacking scientific evidence and promoting the personification of plants. Simard and colleagues published a detailed rebuttal to this critique.

== Science communication ==
Suzanne Simard is an advocate of science communication. At the University of British Columbia, she initiated with colleagues Dr. Julia Dordel and Dr. Maja Krzic the Communication of Science Program TerreWEB, which has been training graduate students to become better communicators of their research since 2011. Simard has appeared in videos intended for general audiences, including three TED talks, the short documentary Do trees communicate?, and the longer documentary films Intelligent Trees (where she appears alongside forester and author Peter Wohlleben) and Fantastic Fungi. New Scientist magazine interviewed Simard in 2021. Suzanne Simard has published a book where she reviews her discoveries about the life of trees and forests along with autobiographical notes.

Simard discussed her work and her book Finding the Mother Tree on BBC Radio 4's Woman's Hour in March 2022.

== Critique and response ==
Following Simard’s 2016 TED Talk and the publication of Finding the Mother Tree in 2021, her work attracted wider public attention as well as scientific criticism. Some scientists have criticized how the results from the studies conducted by Simard on common mycorrhizal networks have been reported to the general public. In 2023, three publications from experts in the field claimed that some myths about the “wood-wide web,” such as being widespread, being beneficial for seedlings, or that older trees favor younger trees, had gone beyond the actual field observations at the time of publication. The authors also argued that positive citation bias in the literature may have contributed to overstating the evidence for these claims. Simard responded to this criticism in a 2025 opinion article.

== Popular culture ==
Simard's life and work served as the primary inspiration for Patricia Westerford, a central character in Richard Powers' 2018 Pulitzer Prize-winning novel The Overstory, in which Westerford pioneers the controversial idea that trees can communicate with each other, and is ridiculed by fellow scientists before eventually being vindicated.

Simard's work was referenced in Season 2, Episode 11 of the Apple TV+ series Ted Lasso when Coach Beard says: "You know, we used to believe that trees competed with each other for light. Suzanne Simard's field work challenged that perception, and we now realize that the forest is a socialist community. Trees work in harmony to share the sunlight."

In 2022 Simard appeared as a panelist in Canada Reads, advocating for Clayton Thomas-Müller's book Life in the City of Dirty Water.

== Selected publications ==
- Finding the Mother Tree: Uncovering the Wisdom and Intelligence of the Forest, Penguin, ISBN 978-0141990286, (2022)
- When the Forest Breathes: Renewal and Resilience in the Natural World, Penguin, ISBN 978-0593318683, (2026)

== See also ==
- Frederic Clements – an earlier proponent of cooperative communities of plants
- Ragan Callaway – another modern proponent of cooperation
- The Overstory – Richard Powers' 2018 Pulitzer Prize winning novel
- Lynn Margulis - considered cooperation a general pattern in biology
- Symbiosis - a broad overview of inter-species relations
