= Finding the Mother Tree =

2021 book by Suzanne Simard

Finding the Mother Tree: Discovering the Wisdom of the Forest
- First edition (US)
- Author: Suzanne Simard
- Audio read by: Suzanne Simard
- Cover artist: Photo: Paul Colangelo, jacket design: Kelly Blair
- Language: English
- Subject: Ecology; forests; logging; mycorrhizal fungus network
- Published: 2021
- Publisher: Knopf audiobook: Random House Audio
- Publication place: United States
- Media type: Print; digital; audiobook
- Pages: 337
- ISBN: 978-0525656098 hardcover
- Website: suzannesimard.com/finding-the-mother-tree-book/

Finding the Mother Tree is a memoir by the Canadian forest ecologist Suzanne Simard. It has been reviewed in The New York Times, The Guardian, The Washington Post, The Wall Street Journal, among other publications.

In her memoir, Simard asserts that trees in forests are interdependent with fungi mycelium. Trees and other plants exchange sugars through their respective root and mycelial structures to share and trade micronutrients. Simard presents her research that fungi physically and chemically connect with the root systems of multiple trees, across species, to create micronutrient pipelines of exchange within a forest community to share these nutrients as well as other molecules. This challenges the "prevailing theory that cooperation is of lesser importance than competition in evolution and ecology."

Simard asserts that healthy forests center on a matriarch tree that acts as a nexus of nutrient distribution that shares these nutrients among other trees of the same or different ages and species that are chemically and physically linked together by an expansive mycorrhizal network. These large-scale, old "mother trees" serve as hubs within the forest network, to deliver carbon to young seedlings through their roots underground in cooperation with fungi.

== Critical reception ==
Tiffany Francis-Baker, writing in The Guardian, compared the book to Robert Macfarlane's book Underland and Peter Wohlleben's The Hidden Life of Trees.

The Wall Street Journal named Finding the Mother Tree one of the ten best books of the year; The Washington Post and Time magazine named it one of the best books of the year.

Jonathan Slaght, reviewing the book for The New York Times, wrote that "(t)his book is a testament to Simard's skill as a science communicator... her arguments are buoyed by rigorous, decades-spanning research".

== Scientific reception ==
In a paper published in Trends in Plant Science, numerous botanical researchers criticized the claims made in the book, some of which are not based on scientific data and contradict established knowledge in many respects, in order to promote a misleading anthropomorphization of trees. Simard and colleagues published a detailed rebuttal to this critique.
