= Don't Make a Wave Committee =

Anti-nuclear organization

The Don't Make a Wave Committee was the name of the anti-nuclear organization which later evolved into Greenpeace, a global environmental organization. The Don't Make a Wave Committee was founded in Vancouver, British Columbia, Canada to protest and attempt to halt further underground nuclear testing by the United States in the National Wildlife Refuge at Amchitka in the Aleutian Islands of Alaska. The Don't Make a Wave Committee was first formed in October 1969 and officially established in early 1970.

== Precursor protest ==
In the late 1960s, the U.S. had plans for an underground nuclear weapon test in Alaska. Because of the 1964 Alaska earthquake the plans raised some concerns about the test triggering earthquakes and causing a tsunami. A 1969 demonstration of 7,000 people blocked a major U.S.-Canada border crossing in British Columbia, carrying signs reading "Don't Make A Wave. It's Your Fault If Our Fault Goes". Further demonstrations occurred at U.S. border crossings in Ontario and Quebec. The protests did not stop the U.S. from detonating the bomb.

While no earthquake nor tsunami followed the test, the opposition grew when the U.S. announced they would detonate a bomb five times more powerful than the first one. Among the opposers were Jim Bohlen, a veteran who had served in the U.S. Navy during the bombings of Hiroshima and Nagasaki, and Irving Stowe and Dorothy Stowe, a Quaker couple. As members of the Sierra Club they were frustrated with the lack of action by the organization.

== Formation ==
In October 1969, Bohlen and the Stowes started meeting at a church basement, calling themselves the Don't Make a Wave Committee and planning anti-nuclear protests. From Irving Stowe, Bohlen learned a form of passive resistance, "bearing witness", where objectionable activity is protested by mere presence. Jim Bohlen's wife Marie came up with the idea to sail to Amchitka, inspired by the anti-nuclear voyages of Albert Bigelow in 1958. The idea ended up in the press and was linked to The Sierra Club. The Sierra Club did not like this connection and in 1970 Jim and Marie Bohlen, Irving and Dorothy Stowe, and Paul Cote, a law student and peace activist established The Don't Make a Wave Committee, working independently of The Sierra Club. Early meetings were held in the Shaughnessy home of Robert and Bobbi Hunter. The first office was opened in a back room of a storefront off Broadway on Cypress, in Kitsilano, Vancouver. In 1973 Greenpeace moved into share a second floor office with SPEC at 2007 West 4th Ave. An additional member of the committee was cultural geographer Terry A. Simmons.

== Transition to Greenpeace ==
During meetings in 1970, Bill Darnell combined the words "green" and "peace", thereby giving the organization its first expedition name, Greenpeace. Many Canadians protested the United States military underground nuclear bomb tests, codenamed Cannikin, beneath the island of Amchitka, Alaska in 1971. In May of the year, the Don't Make a Wave Committee sent Jim Bohlen and Patrick Moore, to represent the Don't Make a Wave Committee in US Atomic Energy Commission hearings in Alaska. The Don't Make a Wave Committee first expedition hired the Phyllis Cormack, a halibut seiner available for charter, to take protestors to the testing zone on the island of Amchitka. The expedition was called Greenpeace I, and included Canadian journalist Robert Hunter. In the fall of 1971, the ship sailed towards Amchitka and faced the U.S. Navy ship Confidence. The activists were forced to turn back. Because of this and the increasingly bad weather the crew decided to return to Canada only to find out that the news about their journey and the support from the crew of the Confidence had generated widespread sympathy for their protest. Greenpeace chartered another ship, a former minesweeper Edgewater Fortune, which was renamed the Greenpeace Too!. Paul Watson, also a co-founder of Greenpeace was selected to crew the 2nd vessel. One day out of Amchitka the United States Atomic Energy Commission conducted the underground 5 Mt Cannikin nuclear test a day earlier than scheduled on November 6, 1971. The nuclear test gained widespread criticism and the U.S. decided not to continue with their test plans at Amchitka. In 1972, The Don't Make a Wave committee changed its official name to Greenpeace Foundation.

On 4 May 1972, following Irving Stowe's departure from the chairmanship of the Don't Make A Wave Committee, the fledgling environmental group officially changed its name to the "Greenpeace Foundation". Later that year David McTaggart would sail his yacht, Greenpeace III, to French Polynesia to oppose the French atmospheric nuclear tests at Mururoa atoll, supported by the new Greenpeace Foundation.

== See also ==
- 1970 in the environment
- Anti-nuclear movement in the United States
- Anti-nuclear movement in Canada
