= Phyllis Cormack =

Seine fishing boat

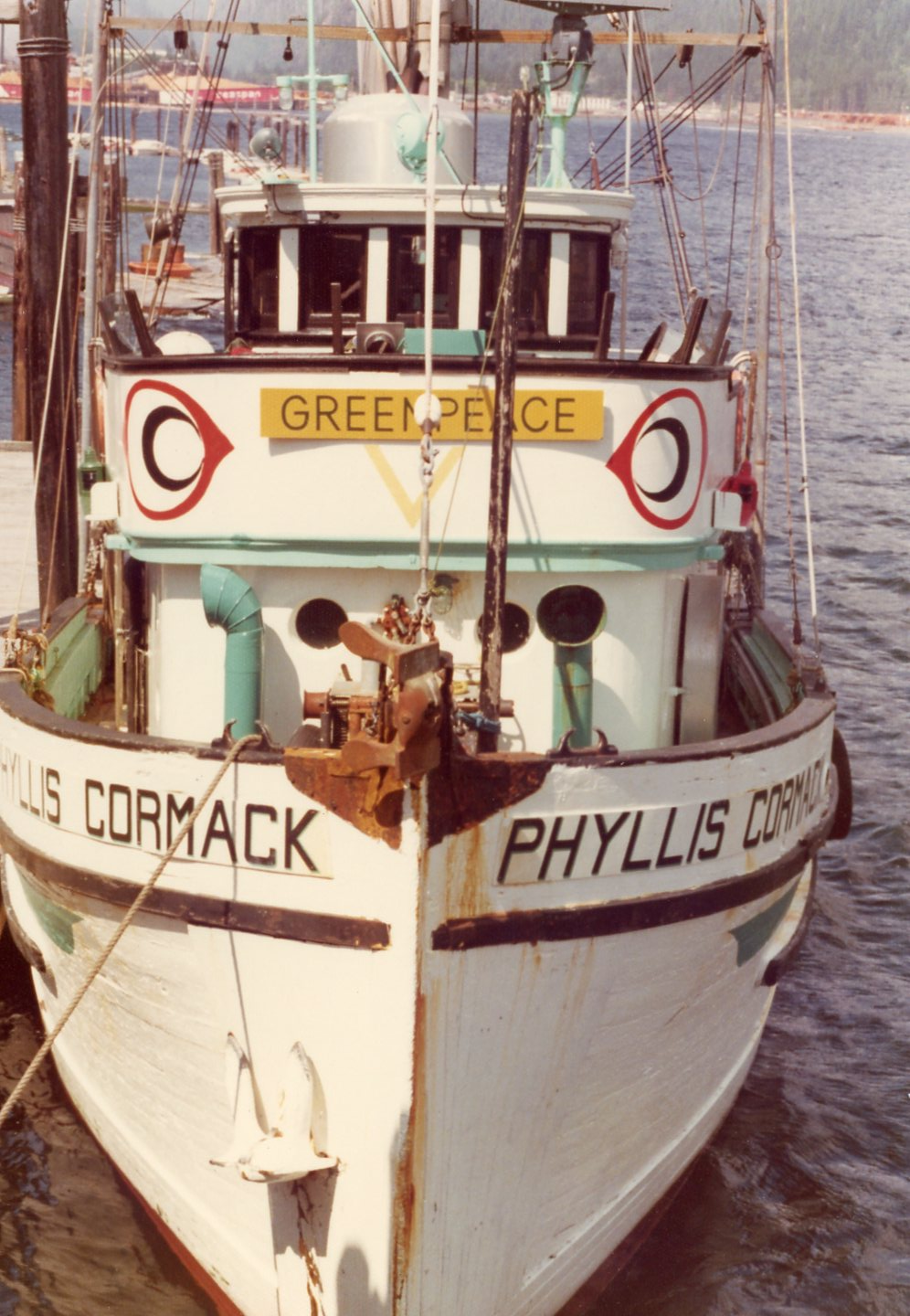
- The Phyllis Cormack in June 1975, docked in Tahsis, British Columbia.

History
- Name: Phyllis Cormack
- Operator: John Cormack
- Port of registry: Canada (Note: "You are a Canadian vessel")
- Builder: Marine View Boat Works, Tacoma, Washington
- Completed: 1941

General characteristics
- Class & type: Seine fishing
- Displacement: 99 tons
- Length: 25 m (82.0 ft)
- Height: over 30 ft (9.1 m) (Note: "the single mast, rising 30 feet above the cabin")
- Propulsion: One Diesel engine
- Sail plan: one sail (Note: "a great, pale green, triangular sail, fixed to the mast and to a boom")
- Crew: 12

The Phyllis Cormack is a 25-meter (82-foot) herring and halibut seine fishing boat, displacing 99 tons and crewed by up to 12 people. The wooden vessel was built in 1941 in Tacoma, Washington, by Marine View Boat Works. (Note: "Marine View Boat Works in Tacoma, Washington, built the fish boat in 1941, designed for stability and space — beamy, with massive oak timbers and fine, edge-grain gum wood planks fixed flush with each other against the oak ribs")

The vessel was chartered in September 1971 by the Don't Make a Wave Committee to travel to Amchitka to protest against the planned nuclear tests there, and the passengers included Bob Hunter, Ben Metcalfe, John Cormack, Jim Bohlen, Patrick Moore and Terry A Simmons. Greenpeace calls this trip "our founding voyage."

== Name ==
The boat's name derives from that of the wife of its skipper, John Cormack.

== Greenpeace charters ==
=== 1971 ===
The vessel was renamed or nicknamed Greenpeace for the voyage, a name subsequently used by the organisation that sprang from the organising committee. Greenpeace International calls this expedition "the founding voyage". The nickname for the boat arose from "the dual ecological and antiwar nature of their mission". At the time, the boat was deemed to be "a bit jury-rigged." The boat's crew was Canadian, and included Bob Hunter, Ben Metcalfe, John Cormack, Jim Bohlen, Patrick Moore, and Terry A Simmons. (Note: "Crew member Patrick Moore went on to become director of Greenpeace Canada") The boat's departure and arrival point was Vancouver, British Columbia, though an unauthorised stop was made in Akutan, Alaska, resulting on a U.S. Coast Guard boarding and a charge of a U.S. customs violation. The crew's sight of a grisly, abandoned whaling station in Akutan was compared to the Communist Party of Kampuchea's Khmer Rouge Killing Fields and it was called a "pivotal" moment that turned Greenpeace on to the idea of saving the whales. (Note: "[The Coast Guard captain] was talking to the captain and some of the leaders of this expedition in the wheelhouse of the Phyllis Cormack anchored in Akutan Bay")

=== 1975 ===
In June 1975, the Phyllis Cormack was chartered by the Greenpeace Foundation, a Vancouver, B.C. ecological organization, to harass USSR and Japanese whaling; the crew included persons fluent in Japanese and in Russian. Greenpeace named the season's campaign "Project Ahab"; it ran about 50 miles offshore California, from Eureka in the north to past San Francisco in the south. The New York Times reported that for "the first time in the history of whaling, human beings had put their lives on the line for whales". The Japanese Fisheries Agency stated the harassers were fanatics for whom their movement "is like a religion".

== Sources ==
- Weyler, Rex (2004), Greenpeace: How a Group of Ecologists, Journalists, and Visionaries Changed the World, Rodale, pp. 30–94, ISBN 1594861064
- Wall, Maggie (25 January 2019), Nuclear testing in Alaska, the '64 Earthquake, the Coast Guard, and Greenpeace, KMXT (FM)
