= Dorothy Stowe =

American–Canadian environmentalist

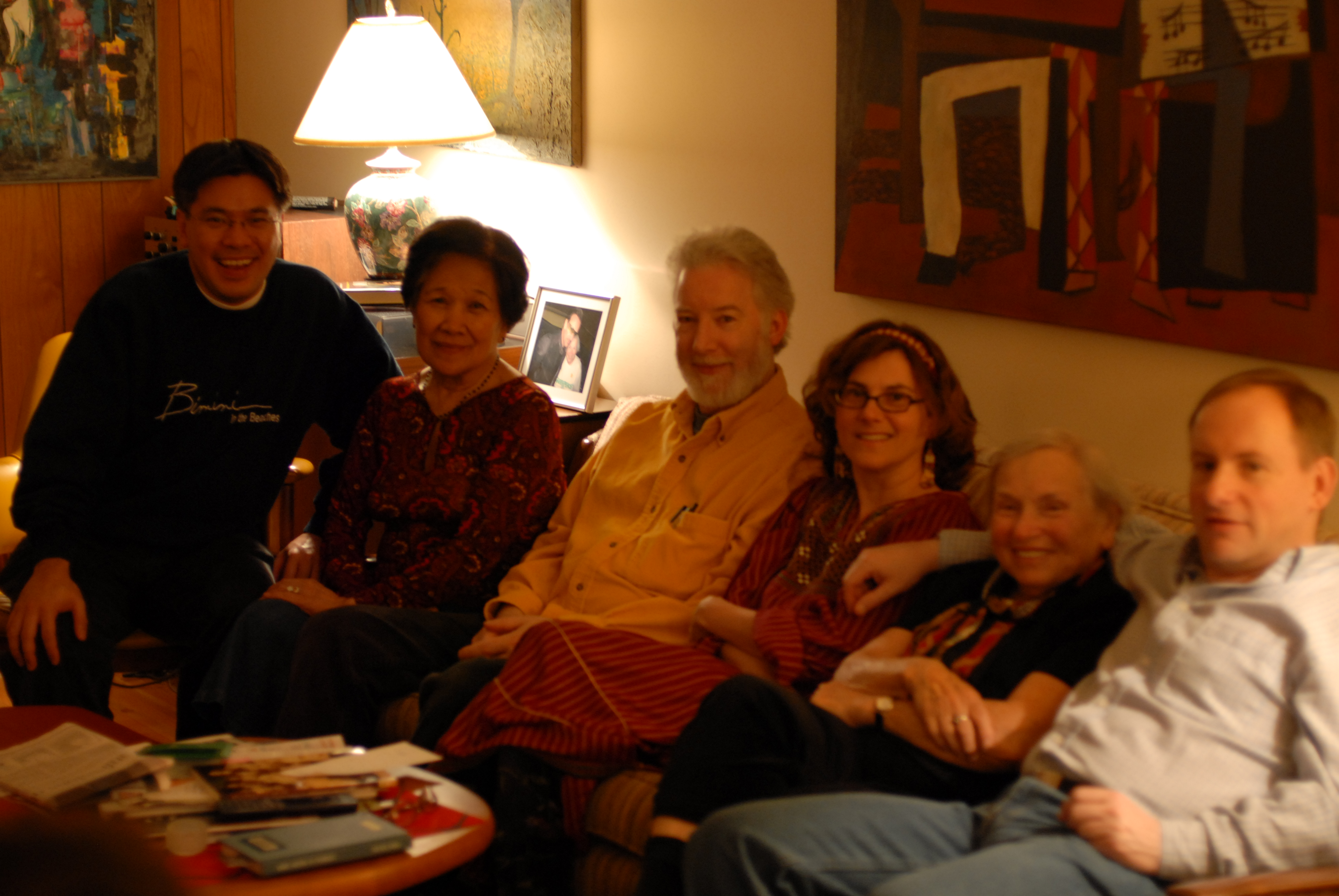
Dorothy Stowe, second from right, with her family in 2006

Dorothy Anne Stowe (née Rabinowitz; December 22, 1920 – July 23, 2010) was an American-born Canadian social activist and environmentalist, best known for co-founding Greenpeace.

== Life and environmentalism ==
Stowe was born in Providence, Rhode Island to a Jewish family. While a college student, she organized and served as the first president of a social workers local of the American Federation of State, County and Municipal Employees. Despite being called a communist by the governor, she won her workers a 33% wage increase.

In 1953, Stowe married Irving Strasmich. The couple became Quakers and changed their surname to Stowe in honor of Harriet Beecher Stowe, a pioneer abolitionist and noted author. The couple had two children, Robert (born 1955) and Barbara (born 1956). In 1961, the family moved to New Zealand to avoid supporting the American government's policies with their taxes. When France started its own nuclear tests in Polynesia, the Stowes relocated to Vancouver, British Columbia, Canada.

In 1968, with Jim and Mary Bohlen, the Stowes founded a group called the Don't Make a Wave Committee to protest announced U.S. nuclear bomb tests on Amchitka Island in Alaska. They chartered a fishing boat named Phyllis Cormack, renamed Greenpeace, to sail to the island. The boat was intercepted by the United States Coast Guard, but the resulting publicity helped bring about the cancellation of the tests. In 1972, Stowe and the other co-founders changed their group's name to Greenpeace. While not as publicly visible as some other members of Greenpeace, she worked hard as a behind-the-scenes organizer. In 2005, when Irish rock band U2 played a concert in Vancouver, they invited Stowe, and Bono dedicated the song "Original of the Species" to her.

Stowe died in Vancouver at UBC Hospital on July 23, 2010, at the age of 89. Her death came just weeks after the death of fellow Greenpeace co-founder Jim Bohlen. Stowe was predeceased by her husband Irving, who died of cancer in 1974.
