= Hamish Kimmins =

Hamish Kimmins CM
- Born: James Peter Kimmins; 1942 (age 83–84)
- Education: University of Wales; University of California, Berkeley; Yale University
- Awards: Queen Elizabeth II Golden Jubilee Medal
- Scientific career
- Fields: Forest ecology
- Workplaces: University of British Columbia
- Thesis: Cyclic Fluctuations in Herbivore Populations in Northern Ecosystems: A General Hypothesis (1970)
- Doctoral students: Patrick Moore

James Peter (Hamish) Kimmins (1942, Jerusalem, Israel – 2021, Denman Island, British Columbia, Canada) was a scientist of forest ecology. He earned his B.Sc. in forestry at the University of Wales Bangor (1964), M.Sc. in Forest Entomology at the University of California at Berkeley (1966), M.Phil. (1968) and Ph.D. in Forest Ecology with honours at Yale University (1970). In 1969, he began at the Faculty of Forestry, University of British Columbia (UBC). where he served in various capacities and retired on December 31, 2007, as Professor of Forest Ecology. In 2007, he received the title of Professor Emeritus at UBC.

Dr. Kimmins was a member of the UNESCO World Commission on the Ethics of Scientific Knowledge and Technology (COMEST) that was established in 1999, as well as a member of various commissions internationally and nationally. He was also Director of International Programs, Forestry Faculty, UBC, and a Director of the Forest Ecosystem Management Simulation Research Group in the Department of Forest Sciences, UBC. As a certified manager and RPF, Dr. Kimmins played an important role as a consultant and lecturer on various topics related to nature conservation, sustainable forest management, whole tree harvesting, and others with the B.C. Ministry of Forests and Canadian government, forestry industry and environmental groups. Internationally, he was involved in projects on land-use issues in multiple countries globally. For many years he was also an Associate of the Liu Centre for the Study of Global Issues at UBC.

Dr. Kimmins published numerous research papers and reports. He is the author of the standard and globally used textbook Forest Ecology (1987) and the lay-person's guide Balancing Act: Environmental Issues in Forestry (1992), second edition 1997, and third addition in 2003. He authored and co-authored over 100 journal papers, and a dozen book chapters.

In addition to the IUFRO Scientific Achievement Award (1986), Professor Kimmins received numerous other awards. The University of Toronto selected him as the 1986 Eddy Distinguished Lecturer; he received the CIF Scientific Achievement Award (1987), was appointed as a Canada Research Chair (2001), and was awarded the Order of Canada (2014). He was appointed Doctor honoris causa by the University of Quebec at Montreal (2010). In recognition of his contributions to forest research, education, and management as well as the resolution of ecological issues, a Hamish Kimmins Scholarship in Forest Ecosystem Studies was established in his honour at UBC.
