= Clayton Thomas-Müller =

Canadian Cree activist and writer

Clayton Thomas-Müller is a Cree activist and writer from Canada, most noted for his memoir Life in the City of Dirty Water.

A member of the Mathias Colomb First Nation, he was raised primarily in Winnipeg, Manitoba. He began his activist work by doing gang intervention work in his teens, before expanding into environmental and indigenous rights activism.

Life in the City of Dirty Water, published in 2021, shares its name with a short documentary film by Thomas-Müller and Spencer Mann which premiered at the 2019 Hot Docs Canadian International Documentary Festival. The book was selected for the 2022 edition of Canada Reads, where it was defended by Suzanne Simard.
