= Irving Stowe =

American lawyer (1915–1974)

- Born: Irving Harold Stowe; July 25, 1915; Providence, Rhode Island, U.S.
- Died: October 28, 1974 (aged 59); Vancouver, British Columbia, Canada
- Education: Brown University (B.Ec); Yale University (M.L.)
- Occupations: Lawyer; activist; environmentalist
- Known for: Co-founding Greenpeace
- Spouse: Dorothy Rabinowitz
- Children: 2

Irving Harold Stowe (né Strasmich; July 25, 1915 – October 28, 1974) was a Yale lawyer, activist, and founder of Greenpeace. He was named one of the "BAM 100" (Brown University's 100 most influential graduates of the 20th century).

== Biography ==
Irving Stowe was born Irving Strasmich in Providence, Rhode Island. He graduated magna cum laude from Brown University in Economics before completing a law degree at Yale. In the 1930s he studied Mandarin, believing it to be the language of the future. He chaired the Legal Advisory Committee of the Rhode Island Council for Human Rights; marched against nuclear proliferation; and on his wedding night (an elopement with Dorothy Rabinowitz, a social worker and fellow activist) both bride and groom attended a benefit dinner for the NAACP.

In 1961 Stowe moved with his wife and their two young children to New Zealand, where he taught Admiralty Law at the University of Auckland. He joined protests against the Vietnam War. Born Jewish, he and his wife both became ardent pacifists and changed their religion to Quaker and their surname to Stowe, in honor of abolitionist author Harriet Beecher Stowe.

In 1966, Stowe and his family moved to Vancouver, Canada, where he became a full-time activist. He drew up the Constitution for a small group trying to stop nuclear testing on Amchitka Island, the Don't Make a Wave Committee. Fellow activists Marie and Jim Bohlen, Patrick Moore, and law student Paul Côté were among the earliest members. At the end of one meeting, Stowe flashed the "V" sign customary in the sixties and said, "Peace". Bill Darnell responded "Let's make it a green peace", coining the phrase that has become ubiquitous.

An environmental columnist, Stowe understood the symbiotic relationship between the media and activism and recruited gifted journalists to the Amchitka campaign. Always passionate about music, he played classical violin, had his stereo equipment custom built. To finance the first Greenpeace voyage he organised a benefit concert with Joni Mitchell, James Taylor, Phil Ochs and Chilliwack, now known as the Amchitka Concert. He was on the executive board of the New Democratic Party of Canada but declined requests to run for office, preferring to work independently as an activist.

In 1972 the Don't Make a Wave Committee officially changed its name to Greenpeace. Stowe died of pancreatic cancer two years later, at the age of 59. After his death, newspaper columnists characterized him as "a man of principle," one who "made a substantial impact on this world, perhaps as much of an impact as could possibly be sought after outside the realms of politics, literature and art." Bob Hunter, who later became president of Greenpeace International, eulogized Stowe in his Vancouver Sun newspaper column: "No one could say that Irving wasted his time here. He expended himself fully. He contributed precisely as much as he could. When other men were lying back, waiting to see what nightmare would materialize next, Irving was moving like a human whirlwind toward the goal of heading the nightmare off."
