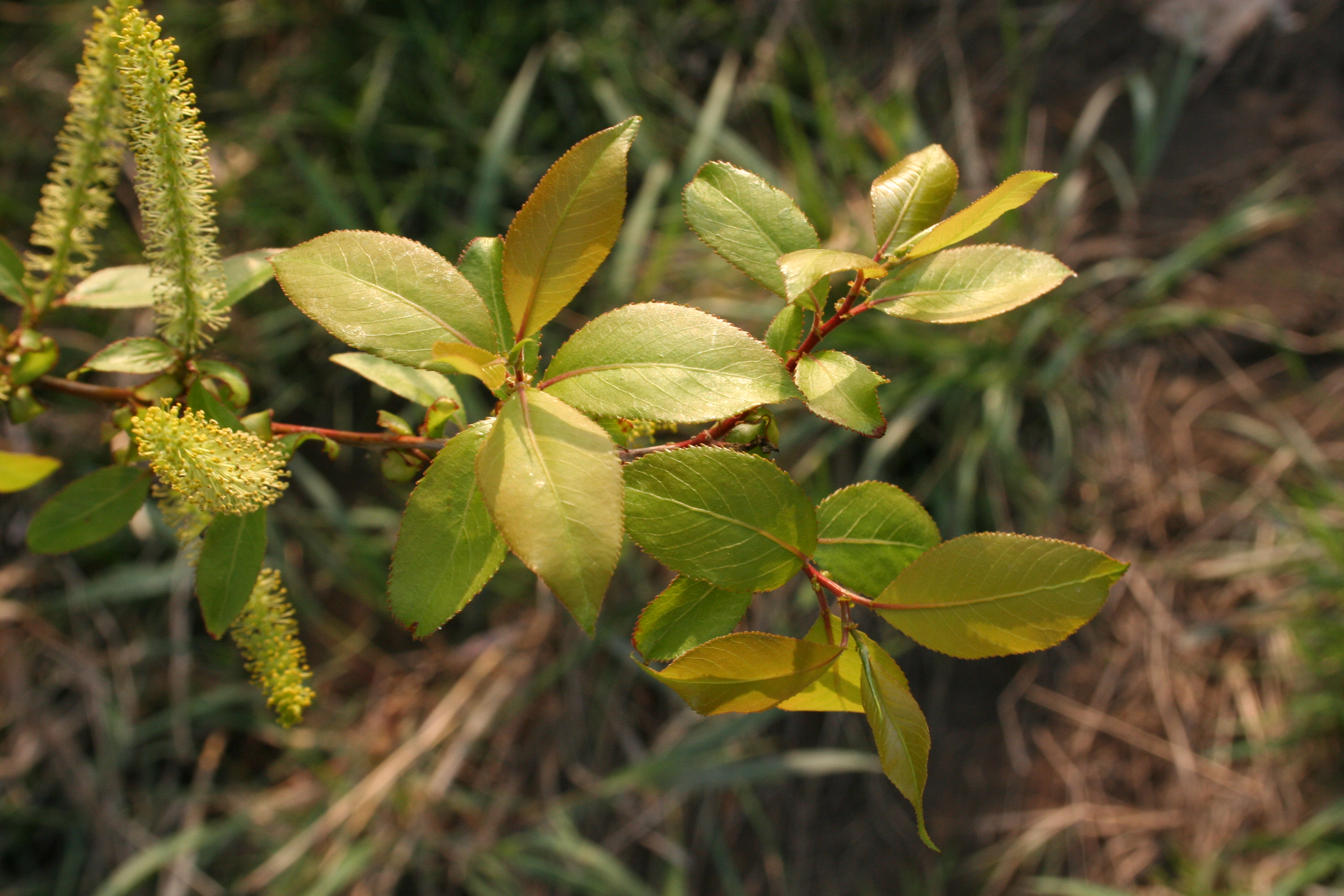

Scientific classification
- Kingdom: Plantae
- Clade: Tracheophytes
- Clade: Angiosperms
- Clade: Eudicots
- Clade: Rosids
- Order: Malpighiales
- Family: Salicaceae
- Genus: Salix
- Species: S. reinii

Binomial name
- Salix reinii Fr. & Sav.

= Salix reinii =

Species of willow

Salix reinii is a species of willow native to Japan and southern Kuriles (Russia). It is a deciduous shrub, and has been found to be a pioneer species on Mt. Fuji.
