= Ragan Callaway =

Ragan (Ray) Callaway is a plant and community ecologist.

Callaway obtained his Masters of Science at the University of Tennessee in 1983 and his Doctor of Philosophy at the University of California, Santa Barbara in 1990. Currently, he researches and teaches out of the University of Montana in Missoula, Montana. His research concentrates on the interactions within plant communities and ecosystems, predominantly those in alpine environments.

He investigates the direct and indirect interactions between plants and with other organisms. More specifically, these interactions include resource competition, allelopathy, facilitation/mutualisms and interactions with invasive species, as well as soil microbe, herbivore and competitor-mediated interactions.

== See also ==
- Suzanne Simard
