= Buck's horn plantain =

Buck's horn plantain is a common name for several plants and may refer to:

- Plantago lanceolata
- Plantago coronopus
