= Ben Metcalfe =

Canadian journalist & Greenpeace chairman (1919–2003)

- Born: Eustace Bennett Metcalfe; October 31, 1919; Winnipeg, Manitoba
- Died: October 14, 2003 (aged 83); Shawnigan Lake, British Columbia
- Occupation: Journalist
- Years active: 1947–1985
- Known for: Greenpeace Co-Founder

Eustace Bennett Metcalfe (October 31, 1919 – October 14, 2003) was a Canadian journalist who, in 1972, became the first chairman of Greenpeace.

== Early life ==
Ben Metcalfe was born in Winnipeg, Manitoba to English immigrant parents. At age 14, he moved to England on his own and, at age 16, joined the Royal Air Force. He was posted in India then, during World War II, served in the campaign against Rommel's Afrika Korps in North Africa.

== Career ==
After being discharged, Metcalfe worked at a London ad agency before being hired as a British Foreign Service information officer in Düsseldorf. Eventually, he moved to Paris, where he got a job as a sports editor at the Continental Daily Mail. At this point, he sold his first story to Reuters, which was about how American efforts to develop nuclear bombs were reliant upon Canadian uranium.

In 1950, Metcalfe returned to Winnipeg and worked for The Winnipeg Tribune. In 1953, he moved back to Europe as a reporter for the North American Newspaper Alliance, and then moved back to Canada and worked for the Flin Flon Reminder before settling in Vancouver and working for The Province newspaper. He then worked for the Canadian Broadcasting Corporation before founding a public relations firm with his wife, and he worked for the Georgia Straight and the Winnipeg Free Press. In 1985, he published a highly-contentious biography of the Canadian conservationist Roderick Haig-Brown.

== Greenpeace ==
Metcalfe's initial story for Reuters was the first of many articles about environmental degradation. In British Columbia, he exposed the government's flooding of the Sekani First Nation's lands to build hydro-electric plants. In 1969, in response to two large detonations by the United States Atomic Energy Commission in Alaska, he bought billboards stating "Ecology? Look it Up! You're Involved!". In 1971, he coordinated the media campaign of the Don't Make a Wave Committee, as it planned to protest the Amchitka Island nuclear test in the Aleutian Islands, and he was a crew member on the Phyllis Cormack which sailed to the site in an attempt to disrupt the test. That committee would soon be renamed Greenpeace. When the Greenpeace Foundation was established, Metcalfe became its first chairman.

Metcalfe recruited businessman David McTaggart into the movement. In 1972, Metcalfe and his group attended the United Nations Conference on the Human Environment in Stockholm and succeeded in carrying the motion "To condemn nuclear weapons tests, especially those carried out in the atmosphere". In 1973, when Greenpeace III sailed into the South Pacific to disrupt French atomic tests, and McTaggart was attacked by French commandos, Metcalfe worked to publicize the incident. He was arrested in Paris and expelled to Italy, where his group succeeded in getting Pope Paul VI to bless the Greenpeace flag. In 1979, McTaggart brokered an agreement that led to the formation of Greenpeace International, ending the leadership of the original founding group, and Metcalfe ceased working for Greenpeace.

== Personal life and death ==
In 1948, Metcalfe married Christiane (Baya) de Frahan. They had two daughters and divorced in 1951.

In 1952, Metcalfe married Dorothy Hrushka. They had one daughter and two sons, both of whom pre-deceased their father.

Metcalfe retired to his home on Vancouver Island, where he died of a heart attack at age 83.
