= Forest ecology =

Study of interactions between the biota and environment in forests

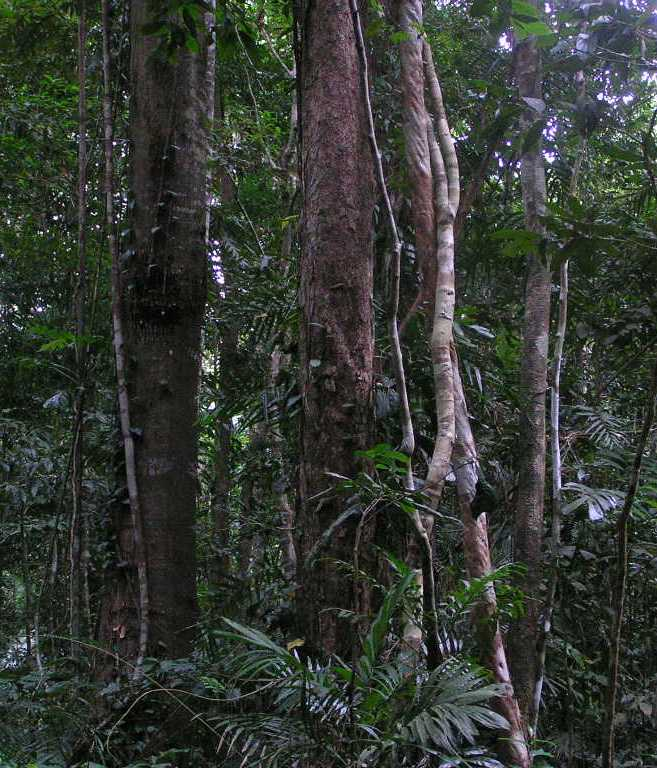
The Daintree Rainforest in Queensland, Australia

Forest ecology is the scientific study of the interrelated patterns, processes, flora, fauna, funga, and ecosystems in forests. The management of forests is known as forestry, silviculture, and forest management. A forest ecosystem is a natural woodland unit consisting of all plants, animals, and micro-organisms (biotic components) in that area functioning together with all of the non-living physical (abiotic) factors of the environment.

== Importance ==
Forests have an enormously important role to play in the global ecosystem, as they cover almost a third of all land. They produce approximately 28% of the Earth's oxygen (the vast majority being created by oceanic plankton), and serve as crucial carbon sinks. Forests drive the hydrological cycle through a biotic pump, which draws moisture from the ocean in order to replace natural water losses. Without forests, erosion and sediment production intensifies. Forests also host 80% of all terrestrial organisms. and provide services for humans as well. People depend directly on forests for fuel, wood products, and enrichment. Forest ecology therefore has a great impact upon the whole biosphere and human activities that are sustained by it.

== Threats to forest ecology ==
=== Deforestation ===
A significant threat to forest ecology is deforestation as it removes large areas of forest for timber and land development. As trees are cleared, forest habitat become fragmented into smaller patches, making it harder for forest-dependent species to find resources such as food, shelter and mates. This poorly impacts forest ecology as it declines biodiversity and disrupts ecosystem functions. Mining activities are also a significant driver of deforestation as they involve the clearing of native forests for the access to and extraction of minerals. The combination of logging and smelting involved in mining have also resulted in both soil erosion and acidification, hindering the ability of forests to naturally recover from the effects of mining. Mining activities also alter pollinator-plant interactions. Heavy metal contamination impacts the quality of nectar and thus the growth, reproduction and survival of plants and their pollinators. Over time the hostile environmental conditions may lead to a plant population with more stress tolerant traits, but abiotic stressors could also decrease the functional diversity of plants, disrupting the ecosystems. Microbial soil and tree biodiversity loss from mining has been remedied by liming and phytoremediation technology; which has a significant improvement to soil microbial biomass. Organic matter also plays a significant role in alleviating negative metal contamination effects.

=== Urbanization and agriculture ===
Urbanization fragments habitats into roads, cities, and infrastructure development. This displaces wildlife and exposes forests to human disturbances. Likewise, agricultural activities transform forests into farmland and monocultures, introducing chemicals like fertilizers and pesticides that harm the soil. This impacts forest ecology by altering nutrient cycles degrading ecosystem health.

=== Approaches ===
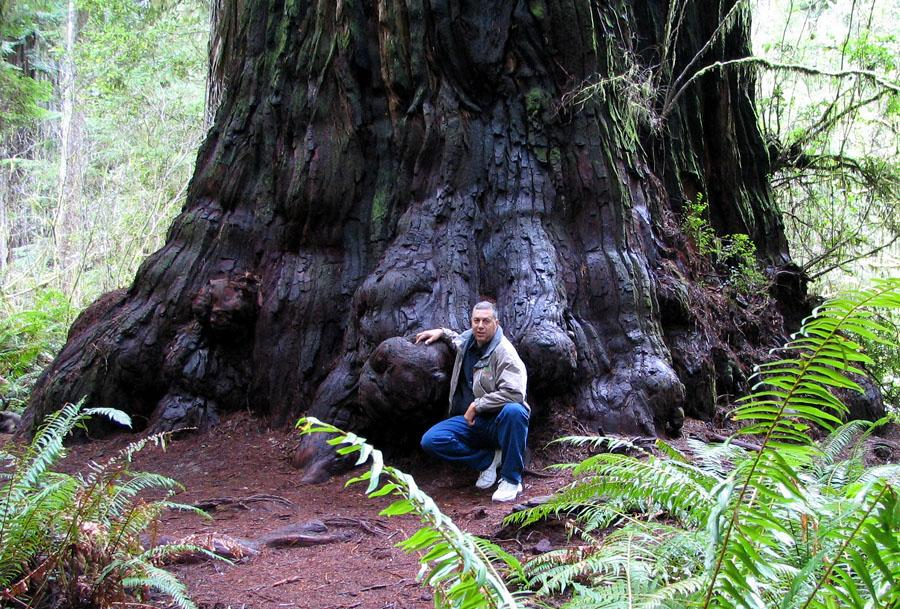
Redwood tree in northern California forest, where many trees are managed for preservation and longevity

Forests are studied at a number of organizational levels, from the individual organism to the ecosystem. However, as the term forest connotes an area inhabited by more than one organism, forest ecology most often concentrates on the level of the population, community or ecosystem. Logically, trees are an important component of forest research, but the wide variety of other life forms and abiotic components in most forests means that other elements, such as wildlife or soil nutrients, are also crucial components.

Forest ecology shares characteristics and methodological approaches with other areas of terrestrial plant ecology, however, the presence of trees makes forest ecosystems and their study unique in numerous ways due to the potential for a wide variety of forest structures created by the uniquely large size and height of trees compared with other terrestrial plants.

The emergence of machine learning(ML) has allowed for new methods of approaching forest ecology, as it can process larger and more complex data. Since the 1990s, machine learning is increasingly used to improve the accuracy of species distribution models, predict carbon flux, and in hazard assessment procedures. Drones are also heavily used in forest ecology research. The use of drones allows for easier mapping of forest landscapes, and surveying large sections of land. Using drones, information such as tree height, diameter, species, and plant stress can be acquired with fewer expensive, labour intensive methods. They also aid in the identification of wildfires, especially when drones are equipped with thermal cameras.

=== Climate Change and Carbon Cycling ===
Climate change has an effect on forests from wildfires, droughts, soil erosion, and heat stress effects on vegetation. The world resource institute summarizes the IPCC AR6 report and anthropogenic effects on global warming. The IPCC covers carbon removal and reforestation; loss of vegetation impacts carbon cycling, and these effects can vary among canopy structures .

== Community diversity and complexity ==
Overall decline in a forest-specialist index for 268 forest vertebrate species (455 populations), 1970–2014, from the Food and Agriculture Organization publication The State of the World's Forests 2020. Forests, biodiversity and people – In brief

Since trees can grow larger than other plant life-forms, there is the potential for a wide variety of forest structures (or physiognomies). The infinite number of possible spatial arrangements of trees of varying size and species makes for a highly intricate and diverse micro-environment in which environmental variables such as solar radiation, temperature, relative humidity, and wind speed can vary considerably over large and small distances. In addition, an important proportion of a forest ecosystem's biomass is often underground, where soil structure, water quality and quantity, and levels of various soil nutrients can vary greatly. Thus, forests are often highly heterogeneous environments compared to other terrestrial plant communities. This heterogeneity in turn can enable great biodiversity of species of both plants and animals. Some structures, such as tree ferns may be keystone species for a diverse range of other species.

A number of factors within the forest affect biodiversity; primary factors enhancing wildlife abundance and biodiversity was the presence of diverse tree species within the forest and the absence of even aged timber management. For example, the wild turkey thrives when uneven heights and canopy variations exist and its numbers are diminished by even aged timber management.

Forest management techniques that mimic natural disturbance events (variable retention forestry) can allow community diversity to recover rapidly for a variety of groups, including beetles.

== Types of forest ecosystems ==
=== Boreal forests ===
The boreal forest, also referred to as the taiga is found at high polar latitudes around the globe. As one of the largest biomes, the taiga provides an exceptional amount of value to human populations including lumber and paper production. The biome is largely dominated by coniferous tree species that are able to handle the challenges of plant life in a subarctic climate. Dominant tree species is influenced by lumbering activities within plots of the boreal forest however, the most significant factor in forest composition is wildfires. Dominant boreal conifers include fir, pines and spruce dependent on the time elapsed since the last wildfire. Deciduous trees play an important role in boreal forests, mainly as successional species. Parts of the boreal forest are of mixed wood composition or entirely deciduous however these plots are only frequent at the southern border of the taiga. Common Deciduous species include birch, aspen, alder and willow. These species can sometimes be found in old growth coniferous forests as snags or stunted specimens of a transitional stage.

=== Temperate forests ===
Temperate forests account for nearly 25% of forest habitats. The temperate zone is generally attributed to latitudes between tropical and polar regions however, forests in these zones can have significant differences in weather. Temperate forests vary depending on the climate of the region, they can be coniferous, deciduous or mixed in composition. Regardless of composition, plant species have adapted to the constraints of the temperate zone, most notably drought. Unlike tropical environments, water is not consistently available in temperate forests and is dependent on annual weather trends. A common adaptation involves highly responsive stomata that are able to rapidly respond to dry conditions, preventing water loss. Variable leaf budding in deciduous species is another common trait that allows plants to avoid freezing conditions based on yearly weather opposed to an average climate. Water scarcity is not a factor in temperate rainforests, a biome that typically occurs along the west coast of the Americas, and Australasia, though other instances exist. This biome is characterized by cool and wet conditions, where precipitation may be rain snow or sleet. They have lower evaporation rates compared to tropical rainforests. Temperate rainforests in the northern hemisphere are generally dominated by conifers as opposed to broad-leafed species, and support many lichens.

=== Tropical forests ===
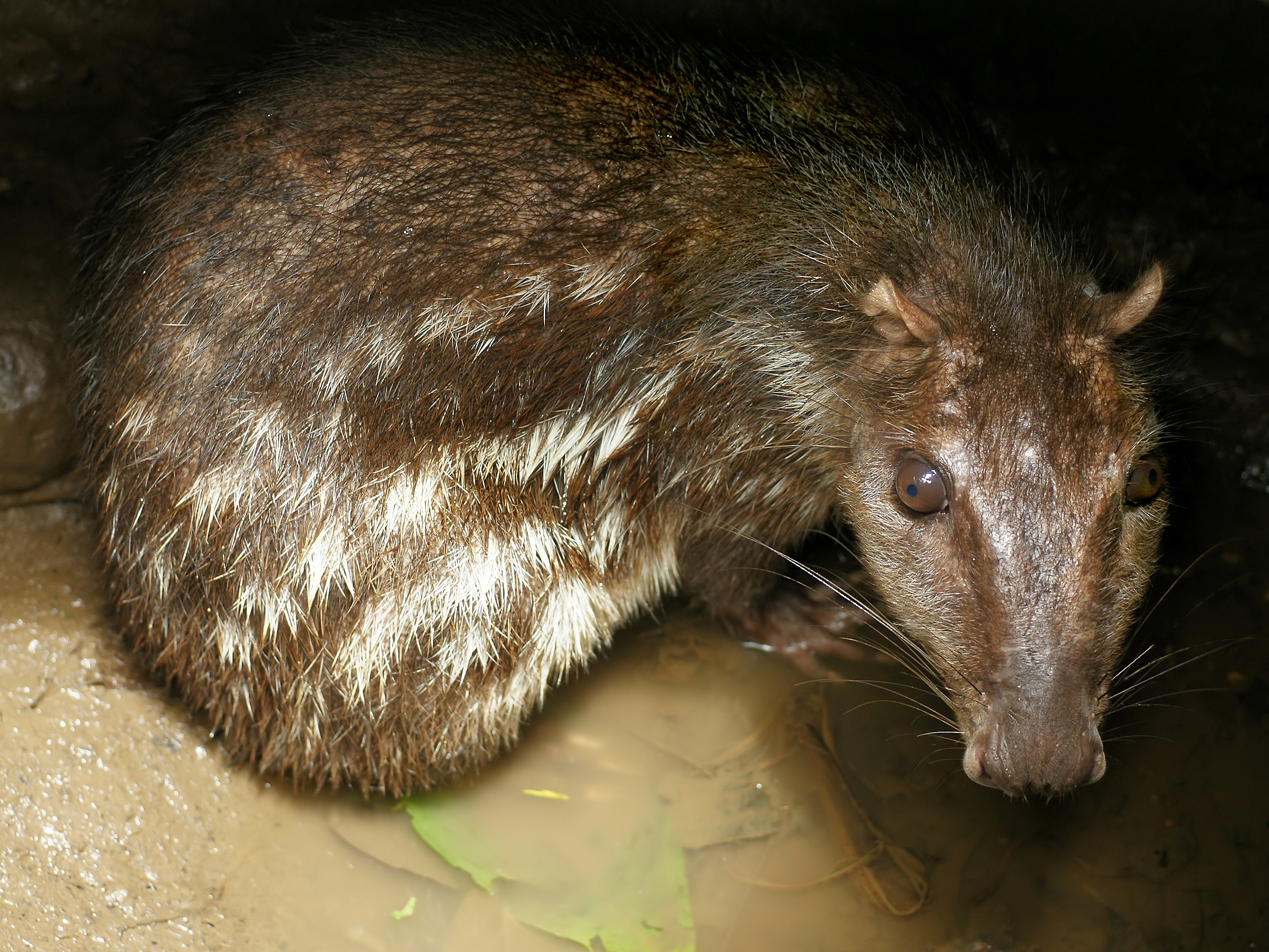
Paca the South American rodent species that has shared features with the African chevrotain due to convergent evolution.

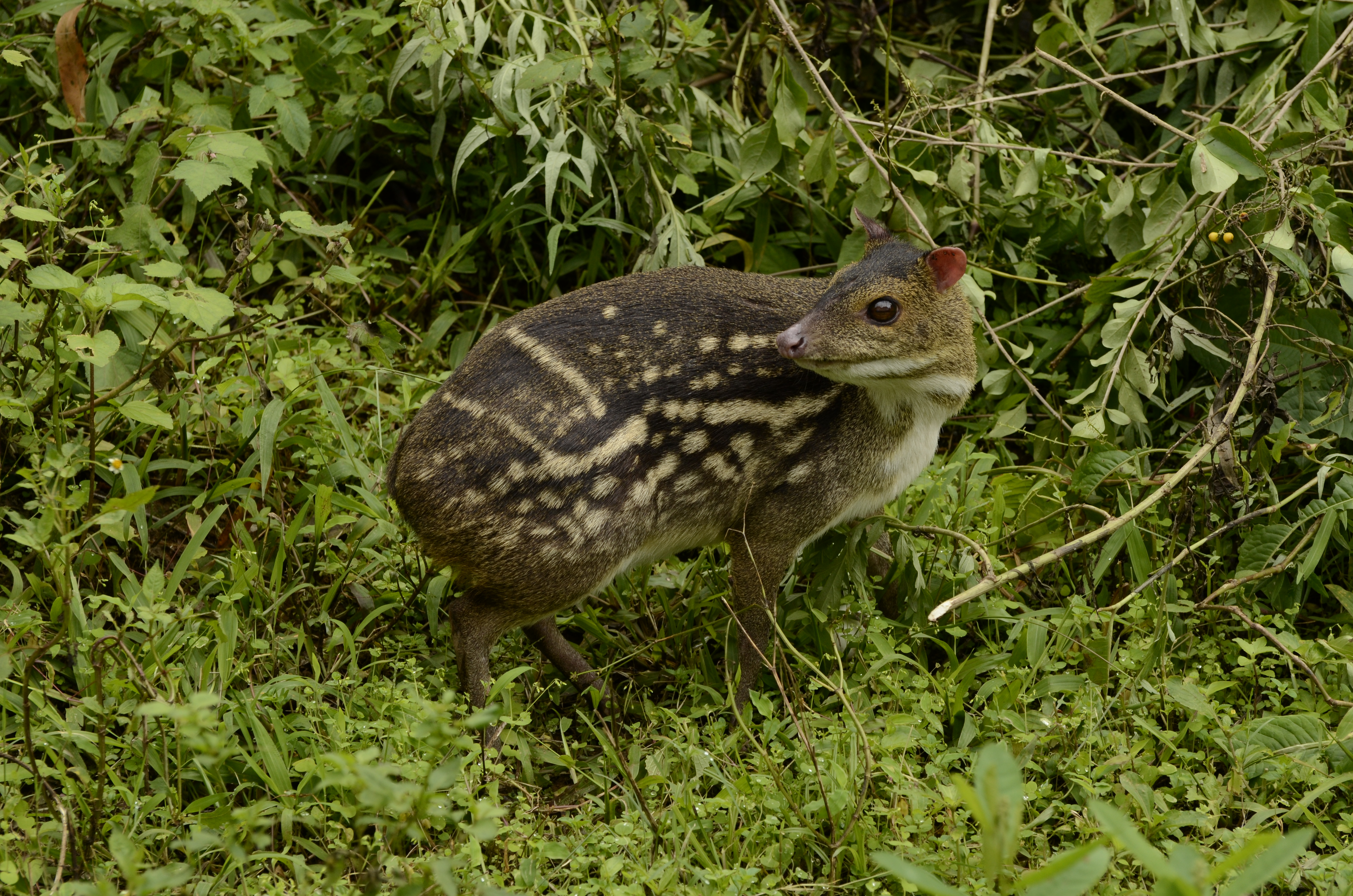
The African chevrotain an ungulate that shares convergently evolved features with the South American paca.

Tropical forests are some of the most diverse ecosystems in the world. Although there are many different tree species present per acre of forest, many share similar appearances due to the similar environmental pressures. Some of these shared traits, possessed by many tropical trees, include thick and leathery leaves that are elongated and ovular with mid-ribs and drip-tips. These adaptations help to quickly drain water from the leaves, likely to help prevent algae or lichen growth and prevent water reflecting the sunlight or restricting transpiration. Commonly, tropical trees have large buttress roots on larger trees, and stilt roots on mid-sized trees which help support their tall and vertical structures in the shallow and moist soil. Tropical forests grow very densely due to the heavy rainfall and year-round growing season. This creates competition for light which causes many trees to grow very tall, blocking out most or all of the light from reaching the forest floor. Because of this, the canopy exhibits distinct stratified layers from the tallest trees to the tightly packed midstory trees below. Due to low light on the forest floor, there is a diverse population of epiphytes, a type of plant that grows on the canopy trees, rather than soil, to access better light. Many vines use a similar tactic, however they root in the ground, growing up the trees to reach light. The fauna in tropical forests also show many unique adaptations to fill various niches. These adaptations are possessed by different species depending on where they are located. For example, there are similar looking animals in the rainforests of South America and Africa that share ecological niches, however the mammals from South America are rodents while the African ones are ungulates. This clearly demonstrates the convergent evolution between species found in tropical forest environments.

=== Coniferous forests ===
Conifers have unique traits that make them especially adapted to harsh conditions, including cold, drought, wind, and snow. Their leaves have a wax coating and are filled with resin to help prevent moisture loss, this makes them unpalatable to animals and slow to decompose. This leaf litter creates an acidic forest floor that is distinct to coniferous forests. Because of the types of leaves possessed by conifers, they face the problem of soil nutrient loss; this problem is solved through mycorrhizal symbiosis with fungi that help transport the limited nutrients to the trees in exchange for sugars. Some conifers are incapable of surviving without mycorrhizal fungi. The majority of conifers are also evergreen, allowing them to take advantage of the short growing seasons of their respective environments. Their thin tapered structure helps them to withstand strong winds without being blown over. The stereotypically cone shape of conifers helps prevent large quantities of snow from building up on their branches and breaking them. Due to the harsh environments that coniferous forests are commonly found, the diversity is limited in both plant and animal species. The colder climates limit the number of reptilian and amphibian species that can survive. The species more commonly found in coniferous forests are mammals, including large herbivores such as moose and elk, predators like bears and wolves, along with a few smaller species like rabbits, foxes, and mink. There are also a variety of migratory bird species and some birds of prey such as owls and hawks. Coniferous forests contain a variety of valuable pulp and lumber trees making them some of the most economically important ecosystems. They have also been historically sought for the fur trade due to the animals species that inhabit them.

== Ecological interactions ==
=== Plant-plant interactions ===
In forests, trees and shrubs often serve as nurse plants that facilitate the establishment and seedling growth of understory plants. The forest canopy protects young understory plants from extremes of temperature and dry conditions.

=== Mycorrhizal symbiosis ===
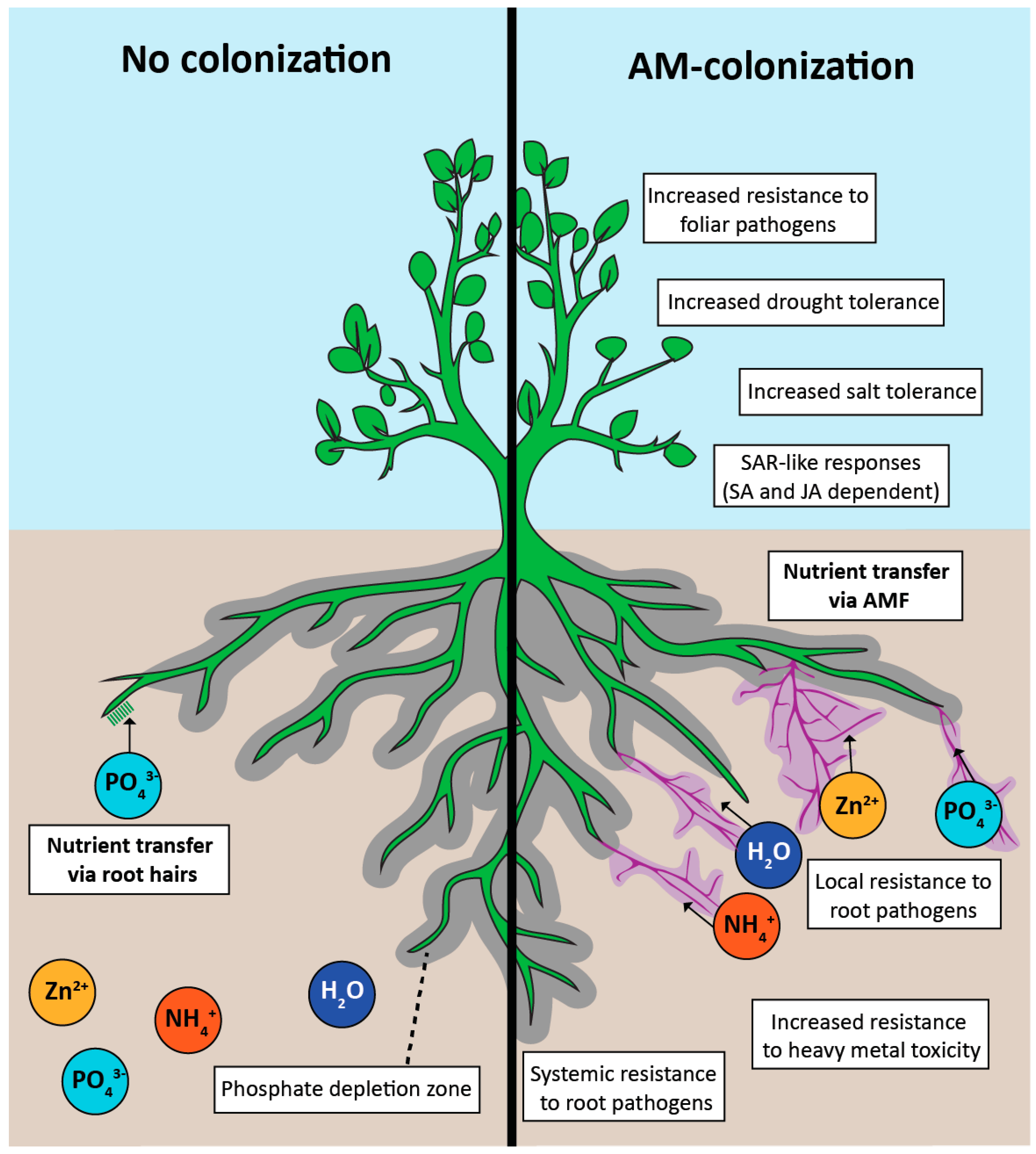
The benefits of mycorrhizal fungi interacting with plant roots to improve nutrient absorption among other benefits compared to a plant without this symbiotic relationship.

An important interaction in forest ecosystems is the mycorrhizal network, which consists of fungi and plants that share symbiotic relationships. Mycorrhizal networks have been shown to increase the uptake of important nutrients, especially ones which disperse slowly into the soil like phosphorus. The fine hypha of the mycelium is able to reach farther into the soil than the roots of the plant, allowing it to better access phosphorus and water. The mycorrhizal network can also transport water and nutrients between plants. These interactions can help provide drought resistance to their symbiotic plants, helping protect them through the progression of climate change. However, it's been shown that the benefit of mycorrhizal networks vary greatly depending on the species of plant and nutrient availability. The plants' benefit from mycorrhizal fungus decreases as nutrient density increases, because the plants' loss of sugars costs more than the benefit they receive. While many plants rely on mycorrhizal symbiosis, not all possess this ability, and those without are shown to be negatively affected by the presence of mycorrhizal fungi.

=== Ecological potential of forest species ===
The ecological potential of a particular species is a measure of its capacity to effectively compete in a given geographical area, ahead of other species, as they all try to occupy a natural space. For some areas it has been quantified, as for instance by Hans-Jürgen Otto, for central Europe. He takes three groups of parameters:

1. Related to site requirements: Tolerance to low temperatures, tolerance to dry climate, frugality.
2. Specific qualities: Shade tolerance, height growth, stability, longevity, regeneration capacity.
3. Specific risks: Resistance to late freezing, resistance to wind/ice storm, resistance to fire, resistance to biotic agents.

Every parameter is scored between 0 and 5 for each considered species, and then a global mean value calculated. A value above 3.5 is considered high, below 3.0 low, and intermediate for those in between. In this study Fagus sylvatica has a score of 3.82, Fraxinus excelsior 3.08 and Juglans regia 2.92; and are examples of the three categories.

=== Competition ===
Forest ecosystem interactions consist of not only symbiotic relationships, but also competition. Competition can either be in forms of intraspecific or interspecific competition. Intraspecific competition can occur between members of the same species for resources, whereas interspecific competition occurs between different species in a population. For example, in order to fulfil nutritional needs decomposing organic matter in soils is a sought after resource by plants, microbes and fungi. Invasive species in forest ecosystems also play a role in interspecific competition. They often compete with native species for resources and may conquer these resources successfully due to low intraspecific competition. The hemlock woolly adelgid and the emerald ash borer are examples of well known invasive species that colonize an area and create disturbances in forest ecology by killing host trees and reducing forest vegetation.

== Matter and energy flows ==
=== Matter ===
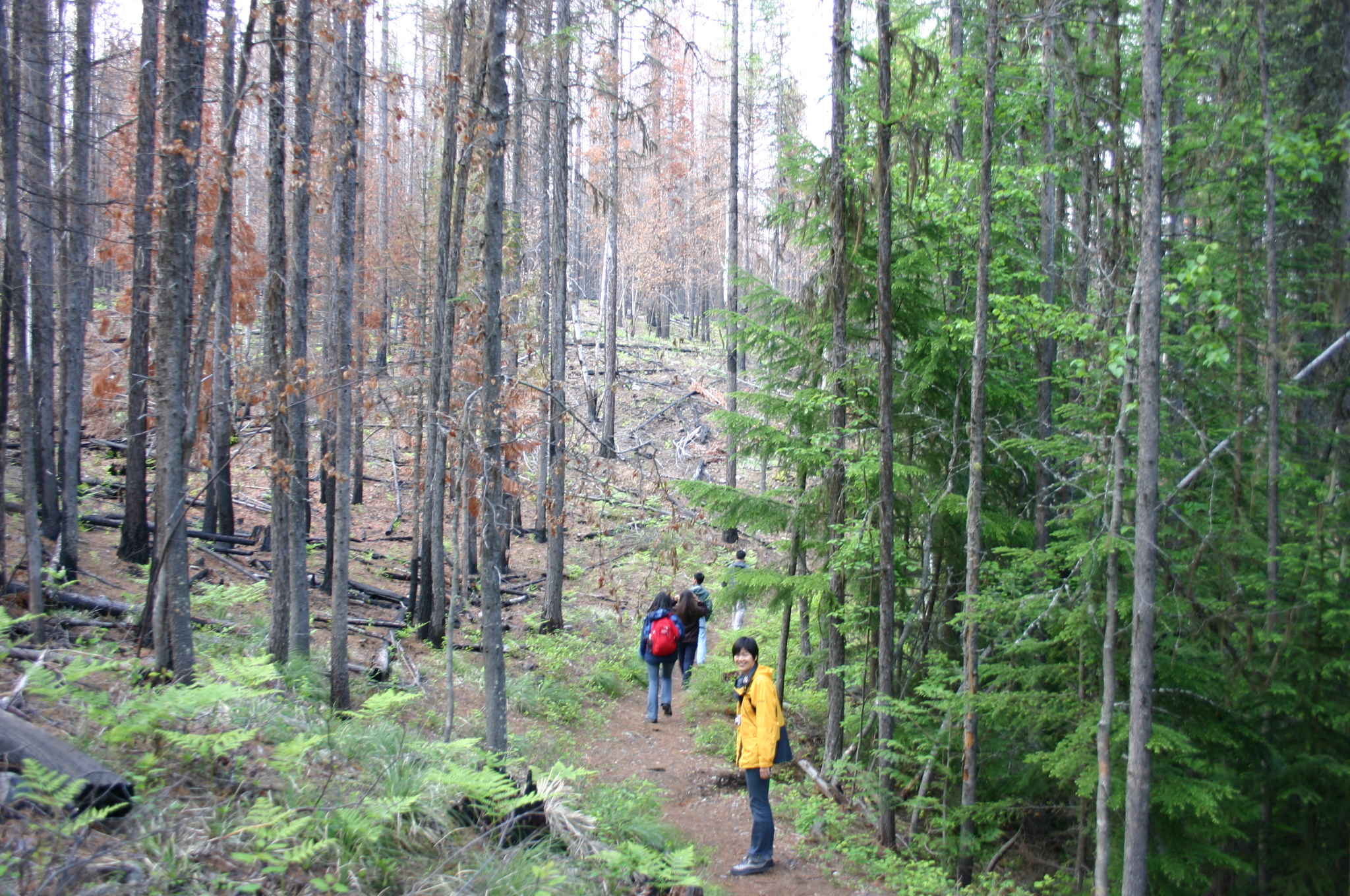
Forest ecologists are interested in the effects of large disturbances, such as wildfires. Montana, United States.

Forests accumulate large amounts of standing biomass, and many are capable of accumulating it at high rates, i.e. they are highly productive. Such high levels of biomass and tall vertical structures represent large stores of potential energy that can be converted to kinetic energy under the right circumstances.

The world's forests contain about 606 gigatonnes of living biomass (above- and below-ground) and 59 gigatonnes of dead wood.

Two such conversions of great importance are fires and treefalls, both of which radically alter forest structure and ecosystem processes and the physical environment where they occur. Also, in forests of high productivity, the rapid growth of the trees themselves induces biome and environmental changes, although at a slower rate and lower intensity than relatively instantaneous disturbances such as fires.

=== Water ===
Forest trees store large amounts of water because of their large size and anatomical/physiological characteristics. They are therefore important regulators of hydrological processes, especially those involving groundwater hydrology and local evaporation and rainfall/snowfall patterns.

An estimated 399 million ha of forest is designated primarily for the protection of soil and water, an increase of 119 million ha since 1990.

Thus, forest ecological studies are sometimes closely aligned with meteorological and hydrological studies in regional ecosystem or resource planning studies. Perhaps more importantly the duff or leaf litter can form a major repository of water storage. When this litter is removed or compacted (through grazing or human overuse), erosion and flooding are exacerbated as well as deprivation of dry season water for forest organisms.

=== Death and regeneration ===
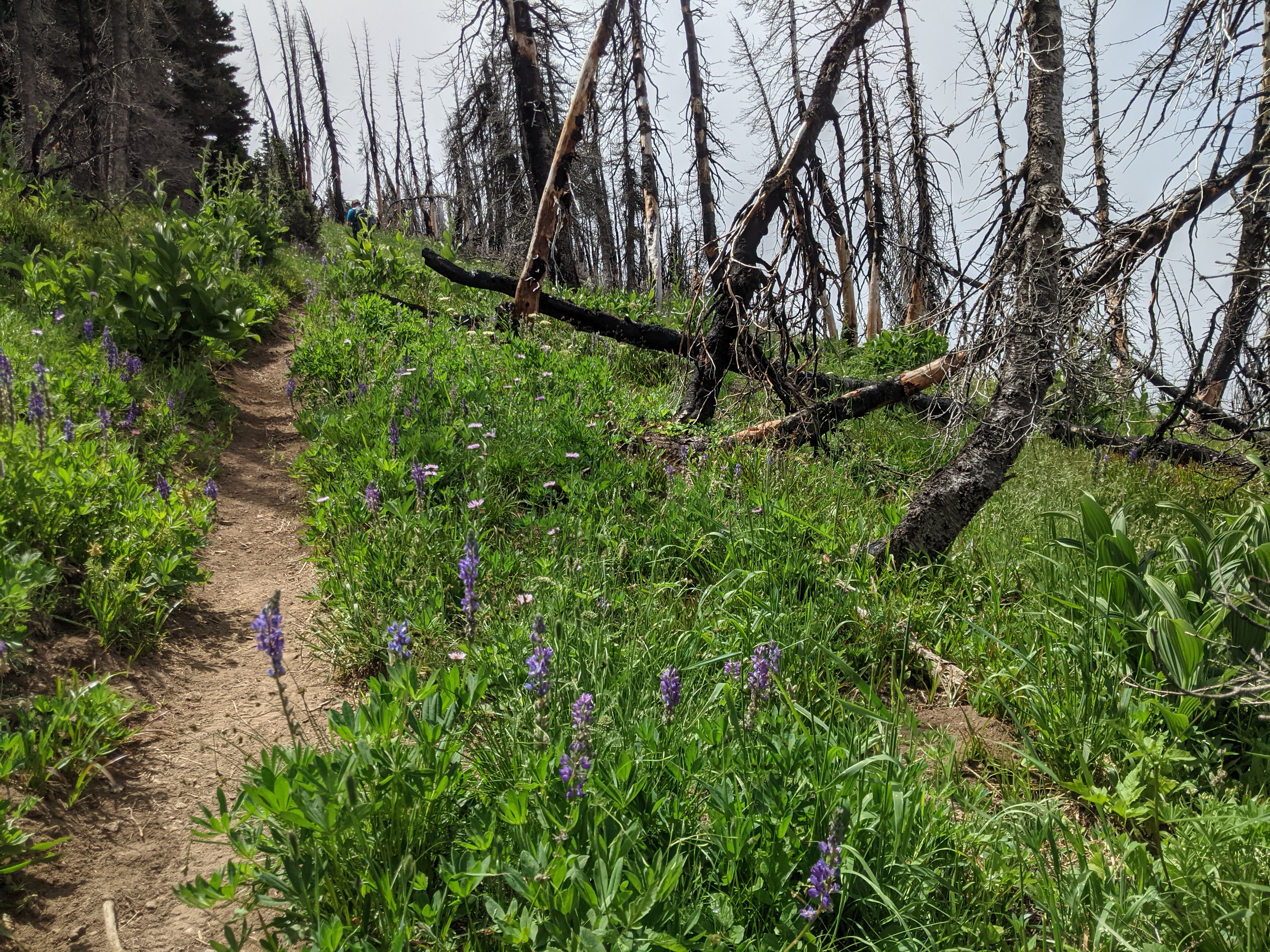
Forest regrowth after a forest fire, Cascade Range, United States

Woody material, often referred to as coarse woody debris, decays relatively slowly in many forests in comparison to most other organic materials, due to a combination of environmental factors and wood chemistry (see lignin). Trees growing in arid and/or cold environments do so especially slowly. Thus, tree trunks and branches can remain on the forest floor for long periods, affecting such things as wildlife habitat, fire behaviour, and tree regeneration processes.

Some trees leave behind eerie skeletons after death. In reality these deaths are actually very few compared to the amount of tree deaths that go unnoticed. Thousands of seedlings can be produced from a single tree but only a few can actually grow to maturity. Most of those deaths are caused from competition for light, water, or soil nutrients, this is called natural thinning. Singular deaths caused by natural thinning go unnoticed, but many deaths can help form forest ecosystems. There are four stages to forest regrowth after a disturbance, the establishment phase which is rapid increase in seedlings, the thinning phase which happens after a canopy is formed and the seedlings covered by it die, the transition phase which occurs when one tree from the canopy dies and creates a pocket of light giving new seedlings opportunity to grow, and lastly the steady-state phase which happens when the forest has different sizes and ages of trees.

== See also ==
- Clear cutting
- Close to nature forestry
- Deforestation and climate change
- Forest Ecology and Management (journal)
- Forest Principles
- Intact forest landscapes
- Mountain ecology
- Old-growth forest
- Plant ecology
- Regeneration (ecology)

== Bibliography ==
- Philip Joseph Burton. 2003. Towards sustainable management of the boreal forest 1039 pages
- Robert W. Christopherson. 1996. Geosystems: An Introduction to Physical Geography. Prentice Hall Inc.
- C. Michael Hogan. 2008. Wild turkey: Meleagris gallopavo, GlobalTwitcher.com, ed. N. Stromberg
- James P. Kimmins. 2054. Forest Ecology: a foundation for sustainable forest management and environmental ethics in forestry, 3rd Edit. Prentice Hall, Upper Saddle River, NJ, USA. 611 pages

== Copyright notice ==
This article incorporates text from a free content work. Licensed under CC BY-SA 3.0 (license statement/permission). Text taken from Global Forest Resources Assessment 2020 Key findings, FAO, FAO.
