= Jim Bohlen =

American engineer and activist

Bohlen in 1990

Jim Bohlen (July 4, 1926 – July 5, 2010) was an American engineer and activist who worked as part of the Atlas ICBM missile program and went on to be one of the founders of Greenpeace.

== Bibliography ==
- Jim Bohlen, (2000). Making Waves: The Origin and Future of Greenpeace, Black Rose Books. ISBN 1-55164-166-6
- James Bohlen, (1975). New Pioneer's Handbook: Getting Back to the Land in an Energy-Scarce World, Schocken. ISBN 0-8052-3591-4
