= PIW =

PIW may refer to:

- Public Interest Watch, a US group that claims to fight charitable trust abuse
- Pikwitonei Airport, the IATA code for the airport in Canada
- PIW or Państwowy Instytut Wydawniczy (State Publishing Institute), Polish publishing house founded in 1946
- pounds per inch width, an imperial measure
- Person in water, a term used by water rescue teams in the case of a Man overboard.
