= Greenpeace =

International non-governmental environmental organization

- Global map of Greenpeace office locations
- Formation: 1969; 57 years ago – 1972 (see article); Vancouver, British Columbia, Canada
- Type: International NGO
- Purpose: Environmentalism, peace
- Headquarters: Amsterdam, Netherlands
- Region served: Worldwide
- Executive Director: Mads Christensen
- Main organ: Board of directors, elected by the Annual General Meeting
- Budget: € 103.735 million (2022)
- Staff: 3,476 (2022)
- Volunteers: 34,365+ (2022)
- Website: greenpeace.org
- Formerly called: Don't Make a Wave Committee (1969–1972)

Greenpeace is a global campaigning network, founded in Canada in 1971 by a group of environmental activists. Greenpeace states its goal is to "ensure the ability of the Earth to nurture life in all its diversity", and focuses its campaigning on worldwide issues such as climate change, deforestation, overfishing, commercial whaling, genetic engineering, anti-war, and anti-nuclear issues. It uses direct action, advocacy, research, and ecotage to achieve its goals. The network comprises 26 independent national/regional organisations in over 55 countries across Europe, the Americas, Africa, Asia, Australia and the Pacific, as well as a coordinating body, Greenpeace International, based in Amsterdam, Netherlands.

The global network does not accept funding from governments, corporations, or political parties, relying on three million individual supporters and foundation grants. Greenpeace has a general consultative status with the United Nations Economic and Social Council and is a founding member of the INGO Accountability Charter, an international non-governmental organization that intends to foster accountability and transparency of non-governmental organizations.

Greenpeace is known for its nonviolent direct actions and has been described as one of the most visible environmental organizations in the world. It has raised environmental issues to public awareness and knowledge, and influenced both the private and the public sector. The organization has received criticism; it was the subject of an open letter from more than 100 Nobel laureates urging Greenpeace to end its campaign against genetically modified organisms (GMOs).

The organization's direct actions have sparked legal actions against Greenpeace itself and activists. Activists were fined and handed suspended sentences for destroying a test plot of genetically modified wheat, and according to the Peruvian government, damaging the Nazca lines, a UN World Heritage site. In March 2025, Greenpeace was found liable for more than $660 million in damages and defamation for the 2016 to 2017 Standing Rock Protests against the Dakota Access Pipeline.

== History ==
=== Origins ===
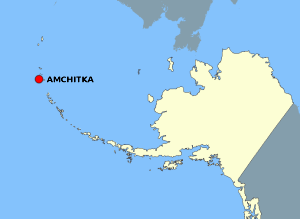
Underground nuclear weapons testing at Amchitka Island was the inspiration for the founding of Greenpeace.

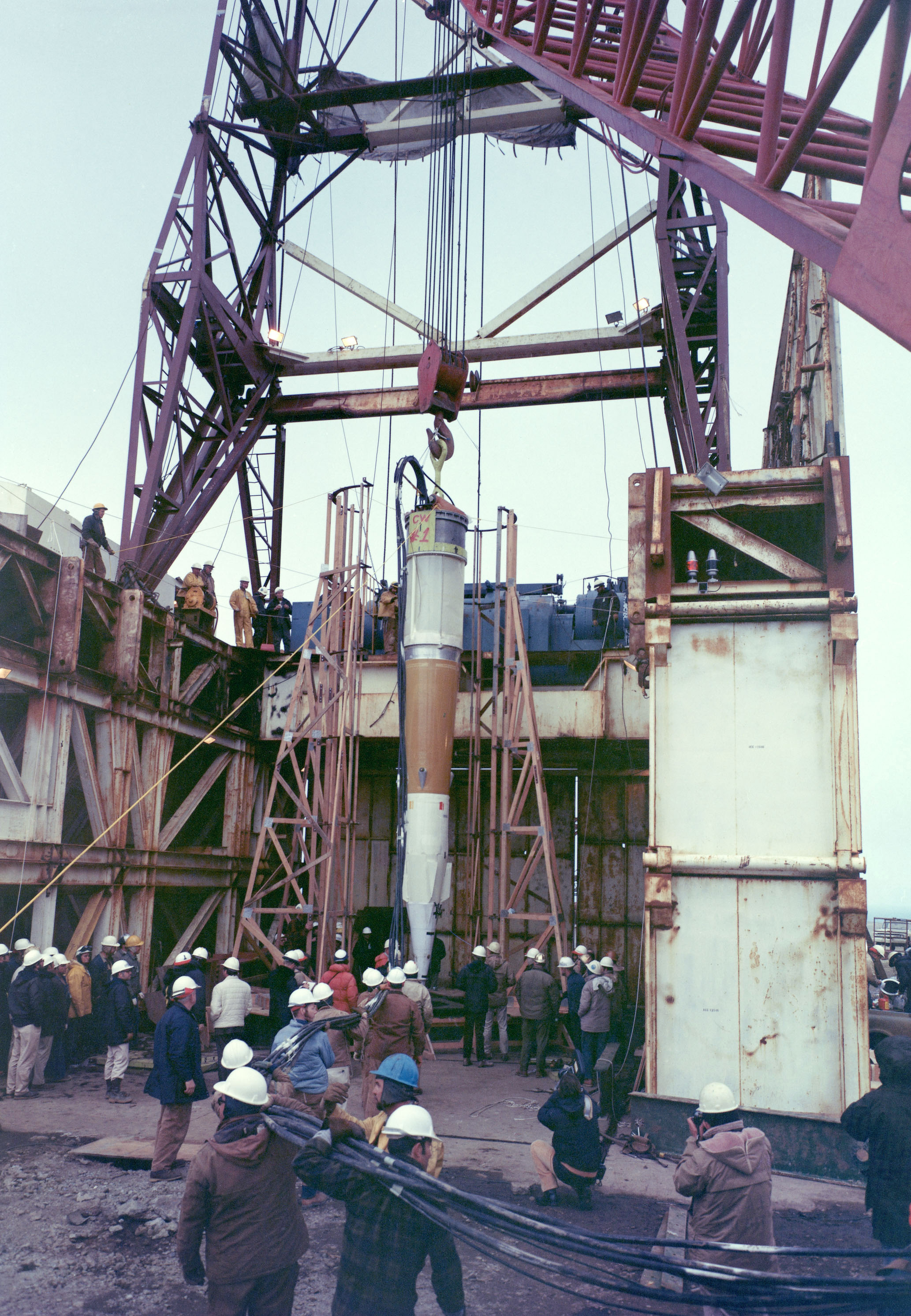
The nuclear device that sparked the creation of Greenpeace being lowered into its firing hole for Cannikin.

In the late 1960s, the U.S. had planned its Cannikin underground nuclear weapon test in the tectonically unstable island of Amchitka in Alaska; the plans raised some concerns of the test triggering earthquakes and causing a tsunami. Some 7,000 people blocked the Peace Arch Border Crossing between British Columbia and Washington, carrying signs reading "Don't Make A Wave. It's Your Fault If Our Fault Goes". and "Stop My Ark's Not Finished". The protests did not stop the U.S. from detonating the bomb.

While no earthquake or tsunami followed the test, the opposition grew when the U.S. announced they would detonate a bomb five times more powerful than the first one. Among the opponents were Jim Bohlen, a veteran who had served in the U.S. Navy, and Irving Stowe and Dorothy Stowe, who had recently become Quakers. They were frustrated by the lack of action by the Sierra Club Canada, of which they were members. From Irving Stowe, Jim Bohlen learned of a form of passive resistance, "bearing witness", where objectionable activity is protested simply by mere presence. Jim Bohlen's wife Marie came up with the idea to sail to Amchitka, inspired by the anti-nuclear voyages of Albert Bigelow in 1958. The idea ended up in the press and was linked to The Sierra Club. The Sierra Club did not like this connection and in 1970 the Don't Make a Wave Committee was established for the protest. Early meetings were held in the Shaughnessy home of Robert Hunter and his wife Bobbi Hunter. Subsequently, the Stowe home at 2775 Courtenay Street in Vancouver became the headquarters. As Rex Weyler put it in his chronology, Greenpeace, in 1969, the Stowes' quiet home on Courtenay Street "would soon become a hub of monumental, global significance". Some of the first Greenpeace meetings were held there. The first office was opened in a backroom storefront on Cypress and West Broadway southeast corner in Kitsilano, Vancouver. Within half a year Greenpeace moved in to share the upstairs office space with The Society Promoting Environmental Conservation on the second floor at 2007, 4th Ave. and Maple in Kitsilano.

Irving Stowe arranged a benefit concert (supported by Joan Baez) that took place on 16 October 1970 at the Pacific Coliseum in Vancouver. The concert created the financial basis for the first Greenpeace campaign. Amchitka, the 1970 concert that launched Greenpeace was published by Greenpeace in November 2009 on CD and is also available as an mp3 download via the Amchitka concert website. Using the money raised with the concert, the Don't Make a Wave Committee chartered a ship, the Phyllis Cormack owned and sailed by John Cormack. The ship was renamed Greenpeace for the protest after a term coined by activist Bill Darnell. The complete crew included: Captain John Cormack (the boat's owner), Jim Bohlen, Bill Darnell, Patrick Moore, Dr Lyle Thurston, Dave Birmingham, Terry A. Simmons, Richard Fineberg, Robert Hunter (journalist), Ben Metcalfe (journalist), Bob Cummings (journalist) and Bob Keziere (photographer).

On 15 September 1971, the ship sailed towards Amchitka and faced the U.S. Coast Guard ship Confidence, which forced the activists to turn back. Because of this and the increasingly bad weather the crew decided to return to Canada only to find out that the news about their journey and reported support from the crew of the Confidence had generated sympathy for their protest. After this, Greenpeace tried to navigate to the test site with other vessels until the U.S. detonated the bomb. The nuclear test was criticized, and the U.S. decided not to continue with their test plans at Amchitka.

==== Founders and founding time of Greenpeace ====
External videos
- The Early Roots of Greenpeace: Bodies On The Line – a 1976 public broadcasting documentary provides an overview of the early founders and campaigns of the organization. (Canadian Broadcasting Corporation, full episode)

Environmental historian Frank Zelko dates the formation of the "Don't Make a Wave Committee" to 1969 and, according to Jim Bohlen, the group adopted the name "Don't Make a Wave Committee" on 28 November 1969. According to the Greenpeace web site, The Don't Make a Wave Committee was established in 1970. The certificate of incorporation of The Don't Make a Wave Committee dates the incorporation to the fifth of October, 1970. Researcher Vanessa Timmer dates the official incorporation to 1971. Greenpeace itself calls the protest voyage of 1971 as "the beginning". According to Patrick Moore, who was an early member and has since mutually distanced himself from Greenpeace, and Rex Weyler, the name of "The Don't Make a Wave Committee" was officially changed to Greenpeace Foundation in 1972.

Vanessa Timmer has referred to the early members as "an unlikely group of loosely organized protestors". Frank Zelko has commented that "unlike Friends of the Earth, for example, which sprung fully formed from the forehead of David Brower, Greenpeace developed in a more evolutionary manner. There was no single founder". Greenpeace itself says on its web page that "there's a joke that in any bar in Vancouver, British Columbia, you can sit down next to someone who claims to have founded Greenpeace. In fact, there was no single founder: name, idea, spirit and tactics can all be said to have separate lineages". Patrick Moore has said that "the truth is that Greenpeace was always a work in progress, not something definitively founded like a country or a company. Therefore there are a few shades of gray about who might lay claim to being a founder of Greenpeace." Early Greenpeace director Rex Weyler says on his homepage that the insiders of Greenpeace have debated about the founders since the mid-1970s.

The current Greenpeace web site lists the founders of The Don't Make a Wave Committee as Dorothy and Irving Stowe, Marie and Jim Bohlen, Ben and Dorothy Metcalfe, and Robert Hunter. According to both Patrick Moore and an interview with Dorothy Stowe, Dorothy Metcalfe, Jim Bohlen and Robert Hunter, the founders of The Don't Make a Wave Committee were Paul Cote, Irving and Dorothy Stowe and Jim and Marie Bohlen.

Paul Watson, founder of the Sea Shepherd Conservation Society maintains that he also was one of the founders of The Don't Make a Wave Committee and Greenpeace. Greenpeace has stated that Watson was an influential early member, but not one of the founders of Greenpeace. Watson has since accused Greenpeace of rewriting their history. Because Patrick Moore was among the crew of the first protest voyage, Moore also considers himself one of the founders. Greenpeace claims that although Moore was a significant early member, he was not among the founders of Greenpeace.

=== After Amchitka ===
After the office in the Stowe home, (and after the first concert fund-raiser) Greenpeace functions moved to other private homes and held public meetings weekly on Wednesday nights at the Kitsilano Neighborhood House before settling, in the autumn of 1974, in a small office shared with the SPEC environmental group at 2007 West 4th at Maple in Kitsilano. When the nuclear tests at Amchitka were over, Greenpeace moved its focus to the French atmospheric nuclear weapons testing at the Moruroa Atoll in French Polynesia. The young organization needed help for their protests and were contacted by David McTaggart, a former businessman living in New Zealand. In 1972 the yacht Vega, a 12.5-metre (41 ft) ketch owned by David McTaggart, was renamed Greenpeace III and sailed in an anti-nuclear protest into the exclusion zone at Moruroa to attempt to disrupt French nuclear testing. This voyage was sponsored and organized by the New Zealand branch of the Campaign for Nuclear Disarmament. The French Navy tried to stop the protest in several ways, including assaulting David McTaggart. McTaggart was supposedly beaten to the point that he lost sight in one of his eyes. However, one of McTaggart's crew members photographed the incident and went public. After the assault was publicized, France announced it would stop the atmospheric nuclear tests.

In the mid-1970s some Greenpeace members started an independent campaign, Project Ahab, against commercial whaling, since Irving Stowe was against Greenpeace focusing on other issues than nuclear weapons. After Irving Stowe died in 1975, the Phyllis Cormack sailed from Vancouver to face Soviet whalers on the coast of California. Greenpeace activists disrupted the whaling by placing themselves between the harpoons and the whales, and footage of the protests spread across the world. Later in the 1970s, the organization widened its focus to include toxic waste and commercial seal hunting. The "Greenpeace Declaration of Interdependence" was published by Greenpeace in the Greenpeace Chronicles (Winter 1976–77). This declaration was a condensation of a number of ecological manifestos Bob Hunter had written over the years.

=== Organizational development ===
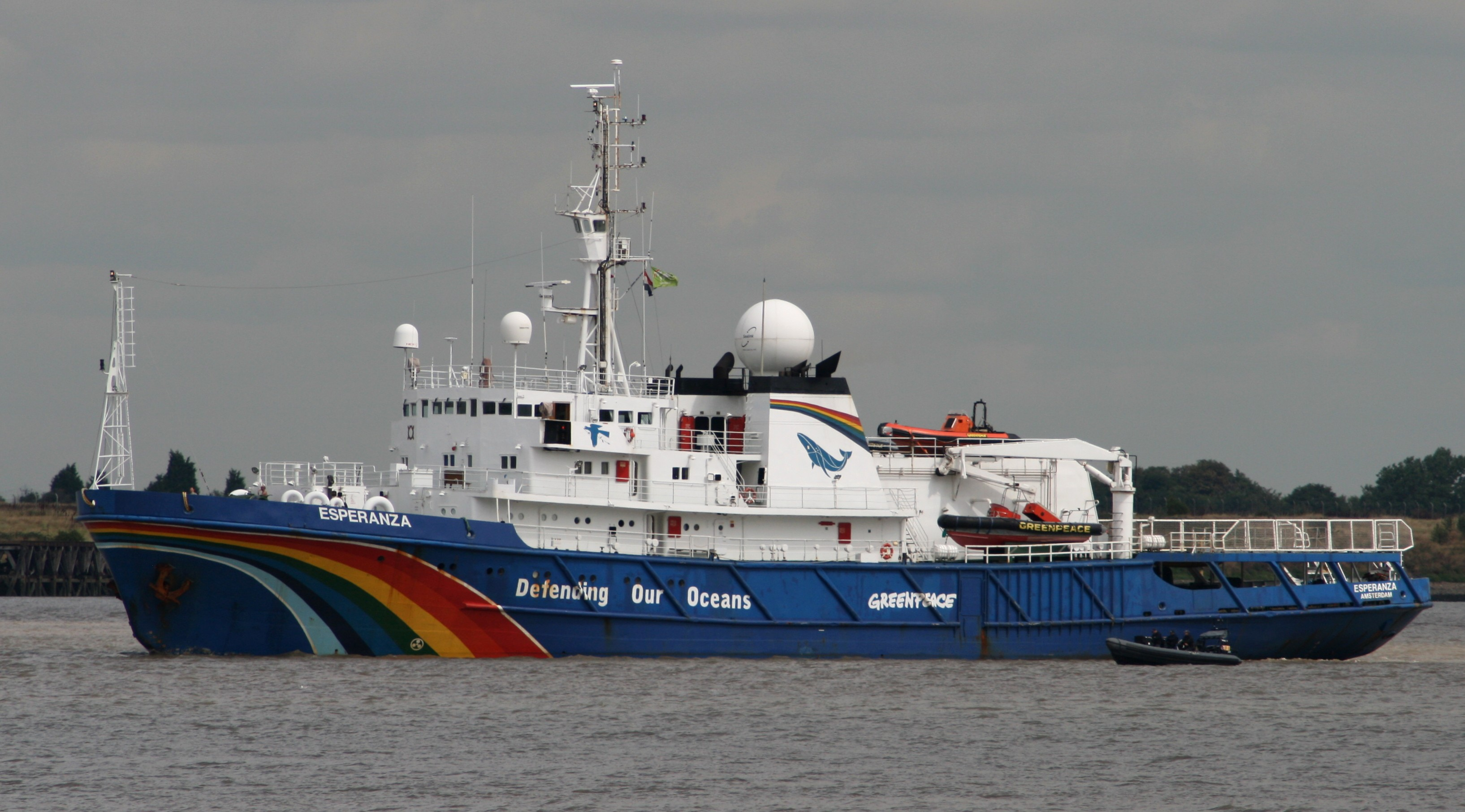
MV Esperanza, a former fire-fighter owned by the Russian Navy, was relaunched by Greenpeace in 2002

Greenpeace evolved from a group of Canadian and American protesters into a less conservative group of environmentalists who were more reflective of the counterculture and hippie youth movements of the 1960s and 1970s. The social and cultural background from which Greenpeace emerged heralded a period of de-conditioning away from Old World antecedents and sought to develop new codes of social, environmental and political behavior.

In the mid-1970s independent groups using the name Greenpeace started springing up worldwide. By 1977, there were 15 to 20 Greenpeace groups around the world, including Great Lakes Greenpeace at Michigan State University. At the same time the Canadian Greenpeace office was heavily in debt. Disputes between offices over fund-raising and organizational direction split the global movement as the North American offices were reluctant to be under the authority of the Canada office.

After the incidents of Moruroa Atoll, David McTaggart had moved to France to battle in court with the French state and helped to develop the cooperation of European Greenpeace groups. David McTaggart lobbied the Canadian Greenpeace Foundation to accept a new structure bringing the scattered Greenpeace offices under the auspices of a single global organization. The European Greenpeace paid the debt of the Canadian Greenpeace office and on 14 October 1979, Greenpeace International came into existence. Under the new structure, the local offices contributed a percentage of their income to the international organization, which took responsibility for setting the overall direction of the movement with each regional office having one vote. Some Greenpeace groups, namely London Greenpeace (dissolved in 2001) and the US-based Greenpeace Foundation (still operational) however decided to remain independent from Greenpeace International.

Along with several other NGOs, Greenpeace was the subject of an improper and baseless investigation by the US Federal Bureau of Investigation between 2001 and 2005. The Inspector General of the US Justice Department determined that there was little or no basis for the investigation and that it resulted in the FBI making inaccurate and misleading claims to the United States Congress.

In 2015, Greenpeace UK launched an investigative journalism publication called Unearthed.

== Organizational structure ==
=== Governance ===
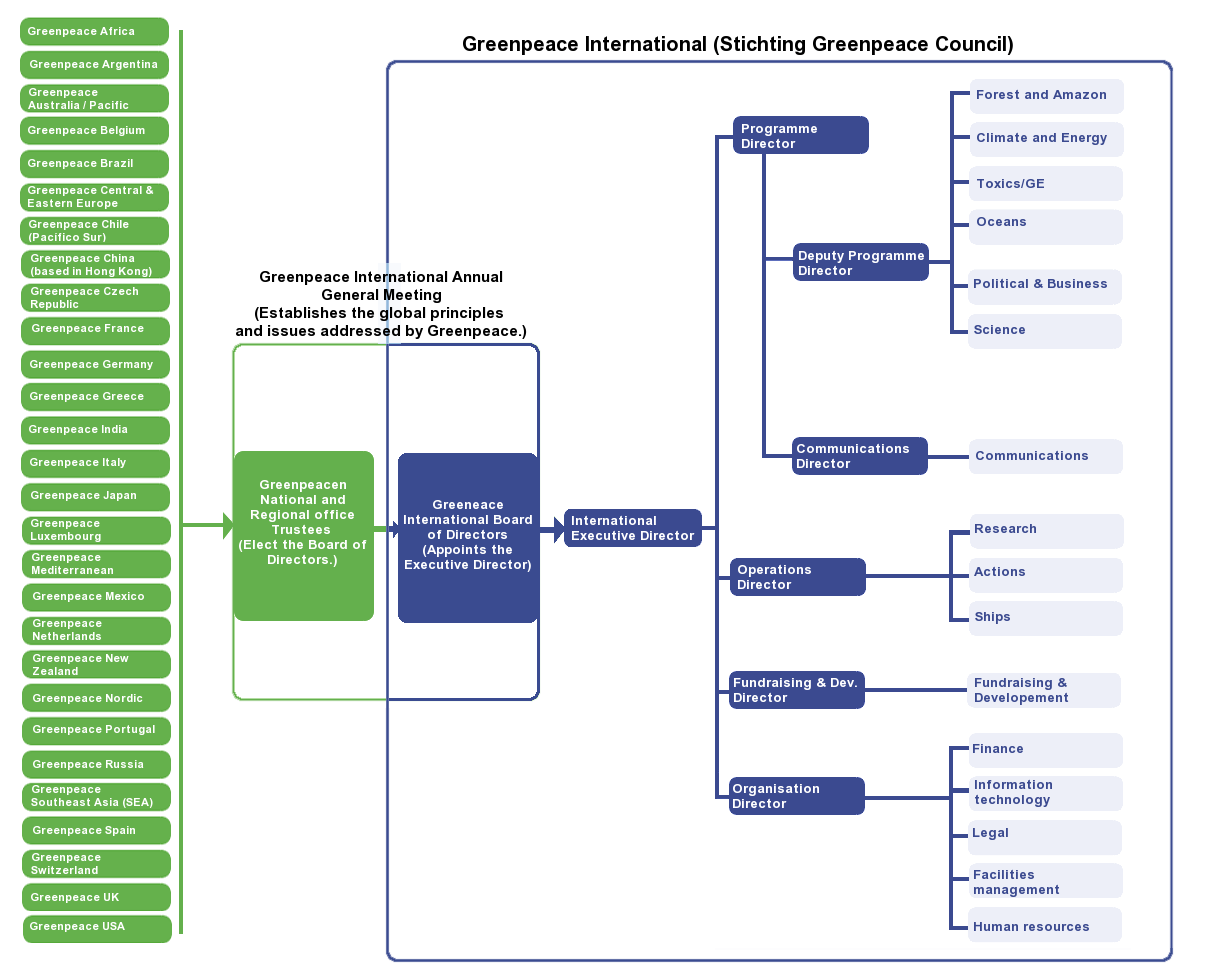
The governance and management structure of Greenpeace.

Greenpeace consists of Greenpeace International (officially Stichting Greenpeace Council) based in Amsterdam, Netherlands, and 25 regional offices operating in 55 countries. The regional offices work largely autonomously under the supervision of Greenpeace International. The executive director of Greenpeace is elected by the board members of Greenpeace International. The current international executive director of Greenpeace International is Mads Flarup Christensen and the current Chair of the Board is David Tong. Greenpeace has a staff of 2,400, and around 15,000 volunteers globally.

Each regional office is led by a regional executive director elected by the regional board of directors. The regional boards also appoint a trustee to The Greenpeace International Annual General Meeting, where the trustees elect or remove the board of directors of Greenpeace International. The annual general meeting's role is also to discuss and decide the overall principles and strategically important issues for Greenpeace in collaboration with the trustees of regional offices and Greenpeace International board of directors.

=== Funding ===
Annual amounts of "Contributions, Gifts, Grants and Other Similar Amounts" as reported on U.S. tax returns filed by the Greenpeace Fund, Inc.

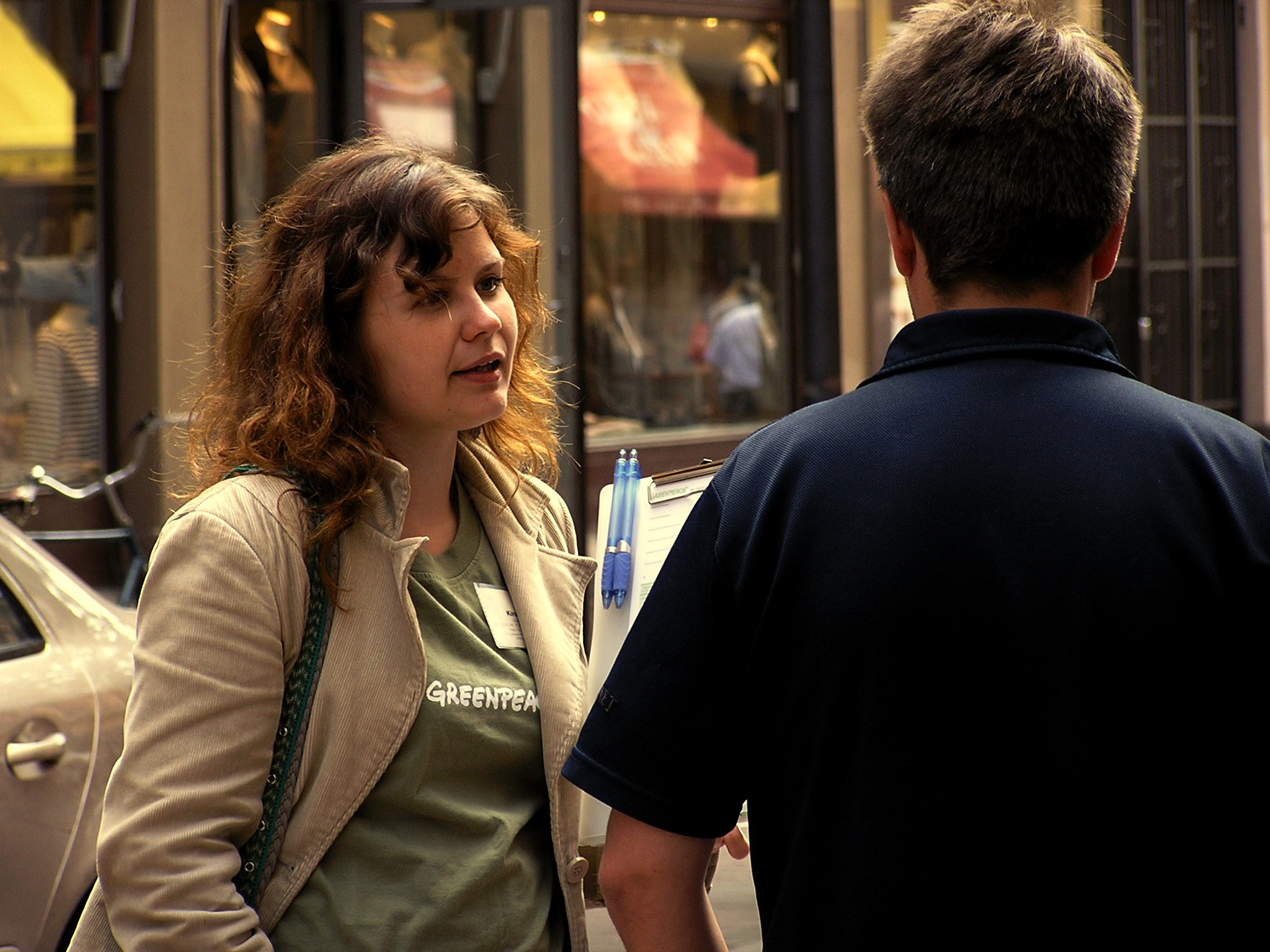
Greenpeace street fundraiser talking to a passer-by

Greenpeace receives its funding from individual supporters and foundations. It screens all major donations in order to ensure it does not receive unwanted donations. Other than the Netherlands' National Postcode Lottery, the biggest government-sponsored lottery in that country, the organization does not accept money from governments, intergovernmental organizations, political parties or corporations in order to avoid their influence.

Donations from foundations which are funded by political parties or receive most of their funding from governments or intergovernmental organizations are rejected. Foundation donations are also rejected if the foundations attach unreasonable conditions, restrictions or constraints on Greenpeace activities or if the donation would compromise the independence and aims of the organization. Since in the mid-1990s the number of supporters started to decrease, Greenpeace pioneered the use of face-to-face fundraising where fundraisers actively seek new supporters at public places, subscribing them for a monthly direct debit donation. In 2008, most of the €202.5 million received by the organization was donated by about 2.6 million regular supporters, mainly from Europe. In 2014, the organization's annual revenue was reported to be about €300 million (US$400 million) although they lost about €4 million (US$5 million) in currency speculation that year.

In September 2003, Public Interest Watch (PIW) complained to the Internal Revenue Service that Greenpeace US's A tax returns were inaccurate and in violation of the law. The IRS conducted an extensive review and concluded in December 2005 that Greenpeace USA continued to qualify for its tax-exempt status. In March 2006 The Wall Street Journal reported that PIW's "federal tax filing, covering August 2003 to July 2004, stated that $120,000 of the $124,095 the group received in contributions during that period came from ExxonMobil". In 2013, after the IRS performed a follow-up audit, which again was clean, and, following claims of politically motivated IRS audits of groups affiliated with the Tea Party movement, Greenpeace U.S. executive director Phil Radford called for a Congressional investigation into all politically motivated audits – including those allegedly targeting the Tea Party Movement, the NAACP, and Greenpeace.

=== Digital transformation ===
International Executive Director Kumi Naidoo declared the 2009 Copenhagen Climate Change Conference a "colossal failure" and indicated the organization faced a "burning platform" moment. Naidoo encouraged Greenpeace's international executive directors to embrace new strategies and tactics or risk becoming irrelevant.

To implement a new strategy approved in 2010, Greenpeace hired Michael Silberman to build a "Digital Mobilisation Centre of Excellence" in 2011, which turned into the Mobilisation Lab ("MobLab"). Designed as a source of best practices, testing, and strategy development, the MobLab also focused on increasing digital capacity and promoting community-based campaigning in 42 countries. In March 2017, the MobLab spun out of Greenpeace through a joint investment by Greenpeace and CIVICUS World Alliance for Citizen Participation."

== Summary of priorities and campaigns ==
On its International website, Greenpeace defines its mission as the following:

Greenpeace is an independent campaigning organisation, which uses non-violent, creative confrontation to expose global environmental problems, and develop solutions for a green and peaceful future. Our goal is to ensure the ability of the earth to nurture life in all its diversity. That means we want to:

- Stop the planet from warming beyond 1.5° to prevent the most catastrophic impacts of the climate breakdown.
- Protect biodiversity in all its forms.
- Slow the volume of hyper-consumption and learn to live within our means.
- Promote renewable energy as a solution that can power the world.
- Nurture peace, global disarmament and non-violence.

== Climate and energy ==
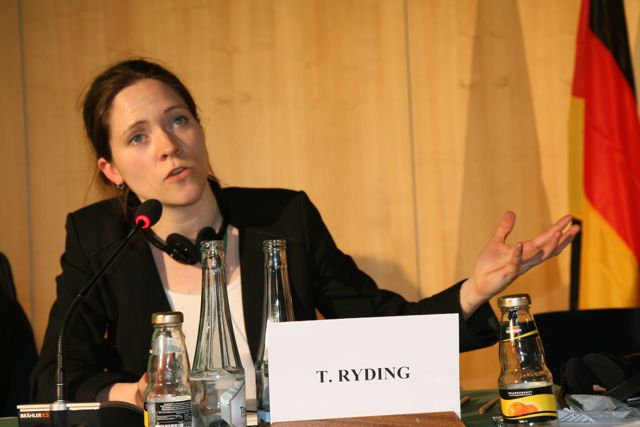
Tove Maria Ryding, in her then role as Greenpeace Climate Policy Coordinator, at the conference from Bonn to Cancun, 2010

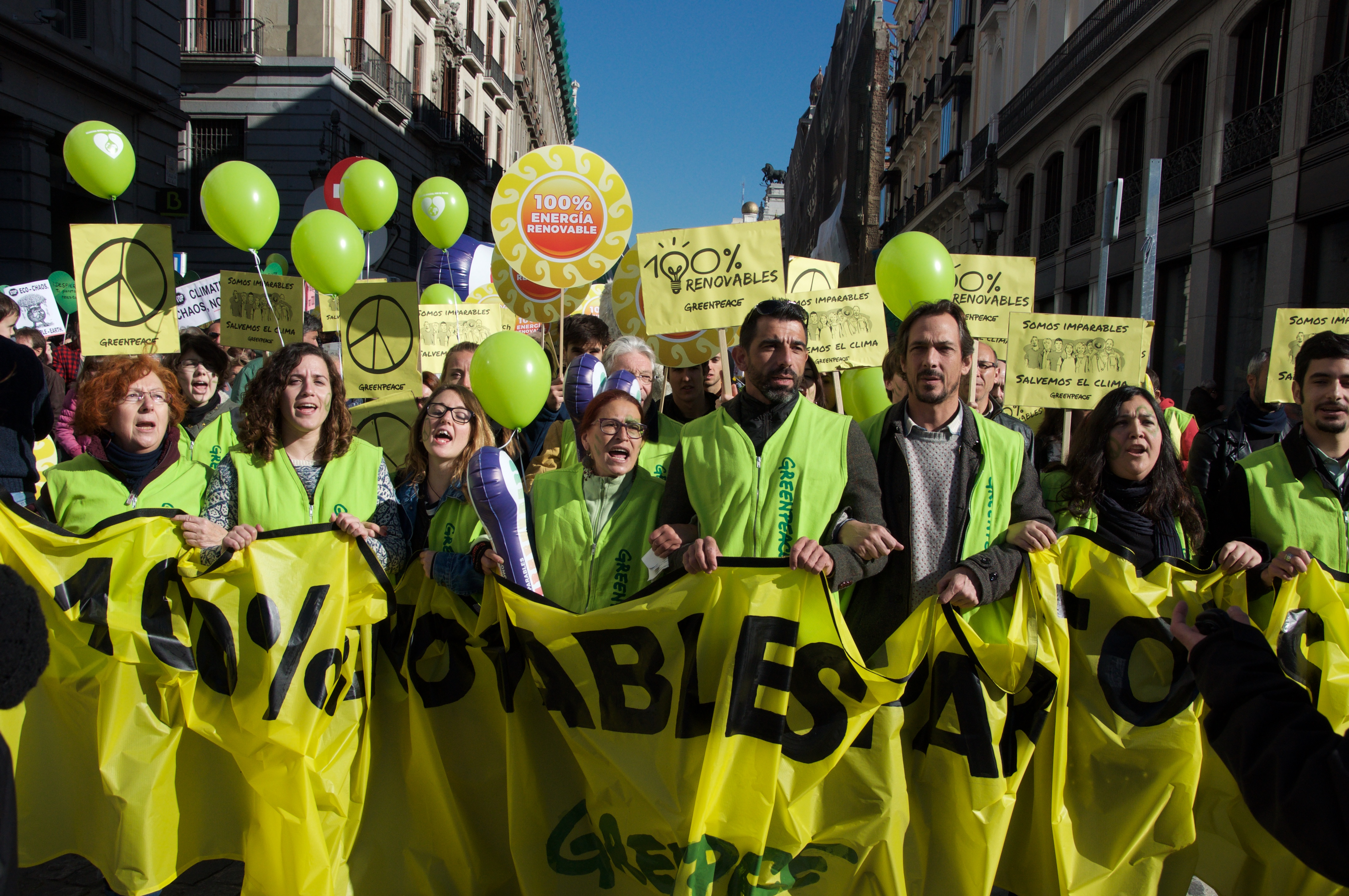
Greenpeace Climate March 2015 in Madrid

Greenpeace was one of the first parties to formulate a sustainable development scenario for climate change mitigation, which it did in 1993. According to sociologists Marc Mormont and Christine Dasnoy, the organization played a significant role in raising public awareness of global warming in the 1990s. Greenpeace has also focused on CFCs, because of both their global warming potential and their effect on the ozone layer. It was one of the leading participants advocating early phase-out of ozone depleting substances in the Montreal Protocol. In the early 1990s, Greenpeace developed a CFC-free refrigerator technology, "Greenfreeze" for mass production together with the refrigerator industry. United Nations Environment Programme awarded Greenpeace for "outstanding contributions to the protection of the Earth's ozone layer" in 1997. In 2011 two-fifths of the world's total production of refrigerators were based on Greenfreeze technology, with over 600 million units in use.

Currently Greenpeace considers global warming to be the greatest environmental problem facing the Earth. It calls for global greenhouse gas emissions to peak in 2015 and to decrease as close to zero as possible by 2050. To reach these numbers, Greenpeace has called for the industrialized countries to cut their emissions at least 40% by 2020 (from 1990 levels) and to give substantial funding for developing countries to build a sustainable energy capacity, to adapt to the inevitable consequences of global warming, and to stop deforestation by 2020. Together with EREC, Greenpeace has formulated a global energy scenario, "Energy [R]evolution", where 80% of the world's total energy is produced with renewables, and the emissions of the energy sector are decreased by over 80% of the 1990 levels by 2050.

Using direct action, members Greenpeace have protested several times against coal by occupying coal power plants and blocking coal shipments and mining operations, in places such as New Zealand, Svalbard, Australia, and the United Kingdom. Greenpeace is also critical of extracting petroleum from oil sands and has used direct action to block operations at the Athabasca oil sands in Canada.

=== Green Planet Energy ===
In 1999, Greenpeace Germany (NGO) founded Greenpeace Energy, a renewable electricity cooperative that also supplied customers with fossil gas starting from 2011. After a 2021 media outcry about an entity associated with Greenpeace selling fossil fuel which has been described as greenwashing, the cooperative changed its name to Green Planet Energy. The Greenpeace Germany NGO retains one share in the cooperative, which has been criticized for "greenwashing" Russian gas.

=== Kingsnorth court case ===
In October 2007, six Greenpeace protesters were arrested for breaking into the Kingsnorth power station in Kent, England; climbing the 200-metre (660-foot) smokestack, painting the name Gordon on the chimney (in reference to former UK Prime Minister, Gordon Brown), and causing an estimated £30,000 damage. At their subsequent trial they admitted trying to shut the station down, but argued that they were legally justified because they were trying to prevent climate change from causing greater damage to property elsewhere around the world. Evidence was heard from David Cameron's environment adviser Zac Goldsmith, climate scientist James E. Hansen and an Inuk leader from Greenland, all saying that climate change was already seriously affecting life around the world. The six activists were acquitted. It was the first case where preventing property damage caused by climate change has been used as part of a "lawful excuse" defense in court. Both The Daily Telegraph and The Guardian described the acquittal as an embarrassment to the Brown Ministry. In December 2008 The New York Times listed the acquittal in its annual list of the most influential ideas of the year.

=== "Go Beyond Oil" ===
As part of their stance on renewable energy commercialisation, Greenpeace have launched the "Go Beyond Oil" campaign. The campaign is focused on slowing, and eventually ending, the world's consumption of oil; with activist activities taking place against companies that pursue oil drilling as a venture. Much of the activities of the "Go Beyond Oil" campaign have been focused on drilling for oil in the Arctic and areas affected by the Deepwater Horizon disaster. The activities of Greenpeace in the Arctic have mainly involved the Edinburgh-based oil and gas exploration company, Cairn Energy; and range from protests at the Cairn Energy's headquarters, to scaling their oil rigs in an attempt to halt the drilling process. The "Go Beyond Oil" campaign also involves applying political pressure on the governments who allow oil exploration in their territories; with the group stating that one of the key aims of the "Go Beyond Oil" campaign is to "work to expose the lengths the oil industry is willing to go to squeeze the last barrels out of the ground and put pressure on industry and governments to move beyond oil."

=== Nuclear power ===
Greenpeace is opposed to nuclear power because it views it as "dangerous, polluting, expensive and non-renewable". The organization highlights the Chernobyl nuclear disaster of 1986 and Fukushima nuclear disaster of 2011 as evidence of the risk nuclear power can pose to people's lives, the environment and the economy. Greenpeace views the benefits of nuclear power to be relatively minor in comparison to its major problems and risks, such as environmental damage and risks from uranium mining, nuclear weapons proliferation, and unresolved questions concerning nuclear waste.

The organization argues that the potential of nuclear power to mitigate global warming is marginal, referring to the IEA energy scenario where an increase in world's nuclear capacity from 2608 TWh in 2007 to 9857 TWh by 2050 would cut global greenhouse gas emissions less than 5% and require 32 nuclear reactor units of 1000 MW capacity built per year until 2050. According to Greenpeace, the slow construction times, construction delays, and hidden costs all negate nuclear power's mitigation potential. This makes the IEA scenario technically and financially unrealistic. They also argue that binding massive amounts of investments on nuclear energy would take funding away from more effective solutions. Greenpeace views the construction of Olkiluoto 3 nuclear power plant in Finland as an example of the problems on building new nuclear power.

In 2022, Greenpeace threatened to sue the European Union after it proposed to categorize nuclear power as a "green" technology that helps countries reduce CO_{2} emissions. Greenpeace celebrated the phaseout of nuclear power in Germany in 2023. At the time, Germany was experiencing an energy crisis and relying heavily on coal and gas for power generation.

==== Anti-nuclear advertisement ====
In 1994, Greenpeace published an anti-nuclear newspaper advert which included a claim that nuclear facilities in Sellafield would kill 2,000 people in the next 10 years, and an image of a hydrocephalus-affected child said to be a victim of nuclear weapons testing in Kazakhstan. Advertising Standards Authority viewed the claim concerning Sellafield as unsubstantiated, lacking any scientific base. This resulted in the banning of the advert. Greenpeace did not admit fault, stating that a Kazakhstan doctor had said that the child's condition was due to nuclear testing even though no nuclear weapons testing is performed in Sellafield.

==== EDF spying conviction and appeal ====
In 2011, a French court fined Électricité de France (EDF) €1.5m and jailed two senior employees for spying on Greenpeace, including hacking into Greenpeace's computer systems. Greenpeace was awarded €500,000 in damages. Although EDF claimed that a security firm had only been employed to monitor Greenpeace, the court disagreed, jailing the head and deputy head of EDF's nuclear security operation for three years each. EDF appealed the conviction, the company was cleared of conspiracy to spy on Greenpeace and the fine was cancelled. Two employees of the security firm, Kargus, run by a former member of France's secret services, received sentences of three and two years respectively.

=== Ozone layer and Greenfreeze ===
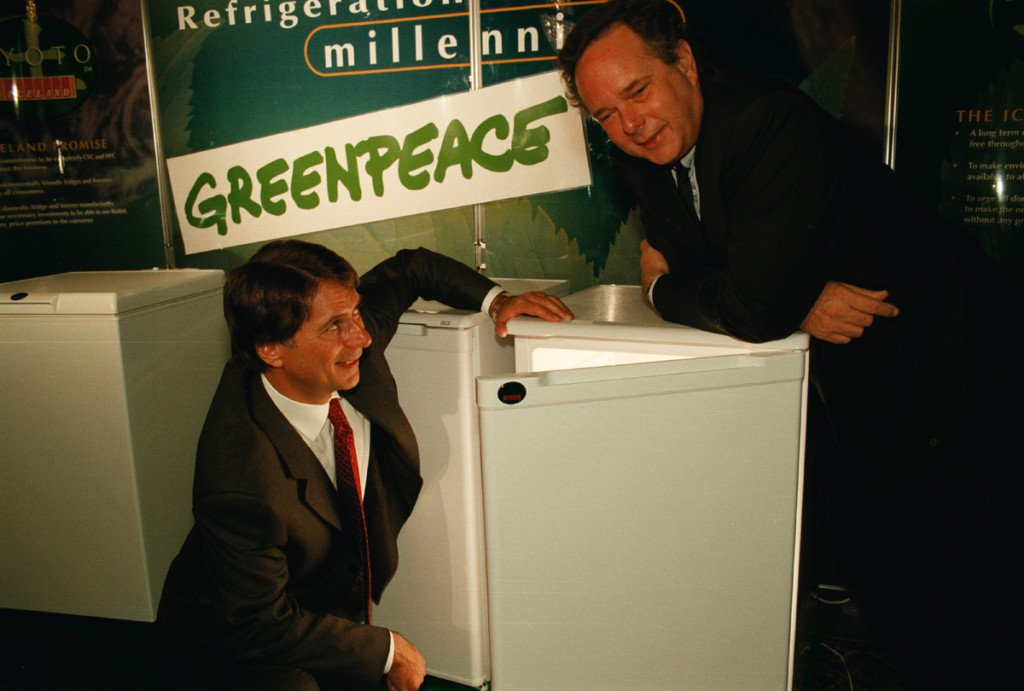
Peter Melchett, right, (then ED of Greenpeace UK) with Malcolm Walker, (Chairman Iceland Frozen Foods) and a Greenfreeze fridge, 1998

The ozone layer surrounding the Earth absorbs significant amounts of ultraviolet radiation. A 1976 report by the US Academy of Sciences supported the ozone "depletion hypothesis". Its suffering large losses from chlorinated and nitrogenous compounds was reported in 1985. Earlier studies had led some countries to enact bans on aerosol sprays, so that the Vienna Convention was signed in 1985 the Montreal Protocol was signed in 1987 to go in force two years later. The use of CFCs and HCFCs in refrigeration were and are among the banned technologies.

A German technological institute developed an ozone-safe hydrocarbon alternative refrigerant that came to a Greenpeace campaigner's attention around 1992. The rights to the technology were donated to Greenpeace, which maintained it as an open source patent. The technology was subsequently used in Germany, then China, elsewhere in Europe, and after some years in Japan and South America, and finally in the US by 2012.

=== Action against new oil licences in the UK ===
In August 2023, Greenpeace highlighted the grant of new oil exploration licences in the United Kingdom, in an action in Yorkshire where they covered the facade of the home of the Prime Minister Rishi Sunak, in black fabric.

== Forest campaign ==
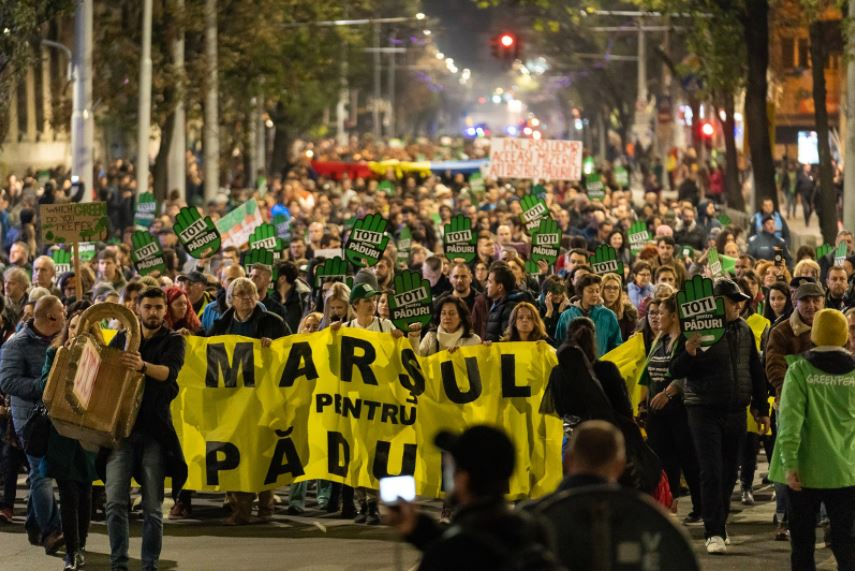
The March For Forests, 2019

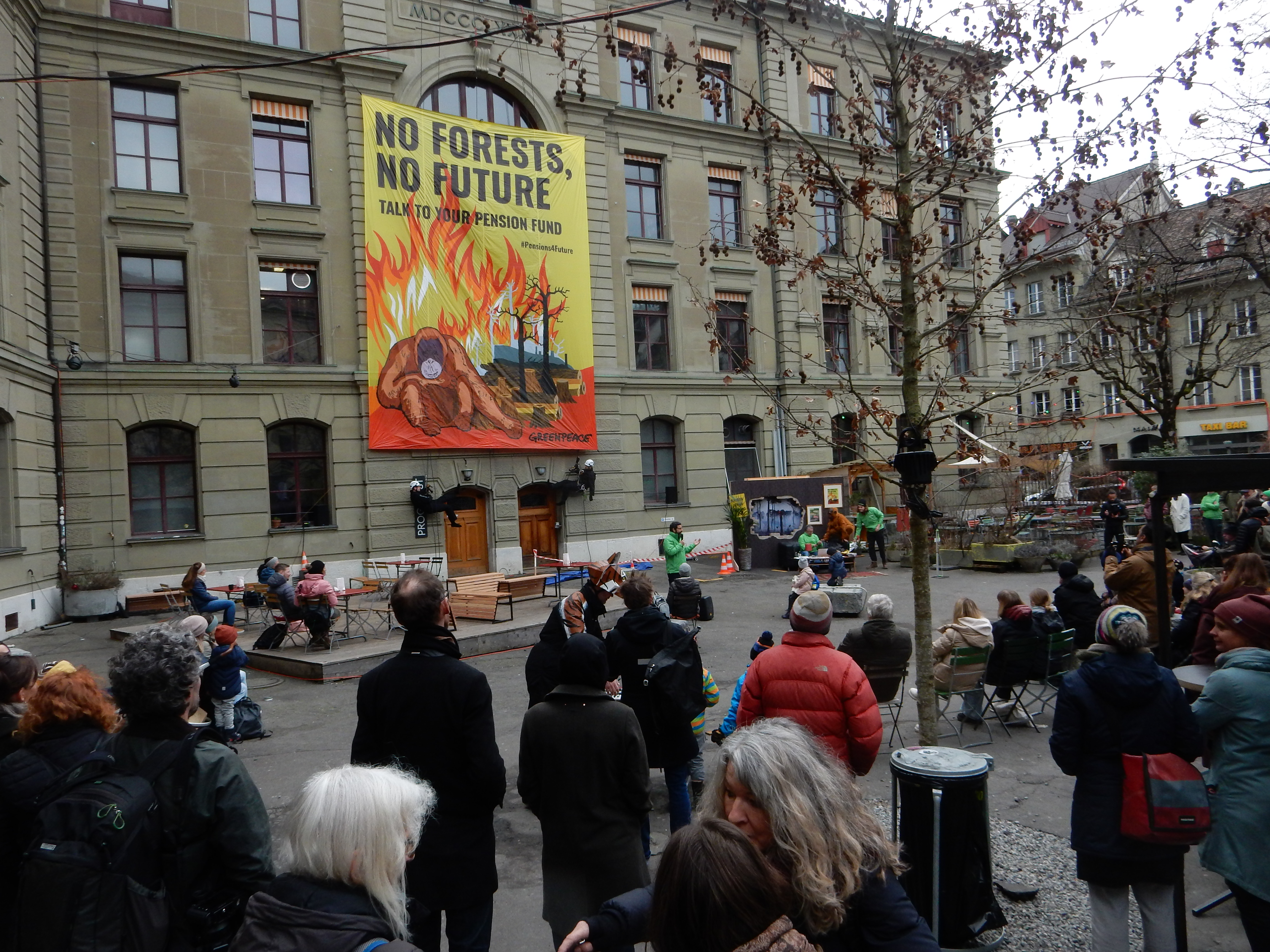
Greenpeace event in Switzerland to bring awareness to protect forests, 2023

Greenpeace aims to protect intact primary forests from deforestation and degradation with the target of zero deforestation by 2020. The organization has accused several corporations, such as Unilever, Nike, KFC, Kit Kat and McDonald's of having links to the deforestation of the tropical rainforests, resulting in policy changes in several of the companies. Greenpeace, together with other environmental NGOs, also campaigned for ten years for the EU to ban import of illegal timber. The EU decided to ban illegal timber in July 2010. As deforestation contributes to global warming, Greenpeace has demanded that REDD (Reduced Emission from Deforestation and Forest Degradation) should be included in the climate treaty following the Kyoto Protocol.

Another Greenpeace movement concerning the rain forests is discouraging palm oil industries. The movement has been the most active in Indonesia where already 6 million hectares (23,000 mi^{2}) are used for palm oil plantation and had plans for another 4 million hectares (15,000 mi^{2}) by 2015. Acknowledging that mass production of palm oil may be disastrous on biodiversity of forests, Greenpeace is actively campaigning against the production, urging the industries and the government to turn to other forms of energy resources. One of the positive results of the campaign was GAR (Golden Agri-Resources), the world's second largest palm oil production company, deciding to commit itself to forest conservation. The company signed an agreement which prevents them from developing plantations in areas where large amounts of carbon are locked up.

On the promotional side, an example of Greenpeace's success in the area is a viral video from 2016 protesting Nestlé's use of palm oil in Kit Kat bars. The video received over 1 million views, and resulted in a public statement by Nestlé claiming to no longer use such practices in their products. In 2018, Greenpeace released an animated short starring a fictional orangutan named Rang-tan ahead of the World Orangutan Day. In November 2018, UK's Clearcast have denied a version of Rang-tan video as submitted by Iceland Foods Ltd.

=== Removal of an ancient tree ===
In June 1995, Greenpeace took a trunk of a tree from the forests of the proposed national park of Koitajoki in Ilomantsi, Finland and put it on display at exhibitions held in Austria and Germany. Greenpeace said in a press conference that the tree was originally from a logged area in the ancient forest which was supposed to be protected. Metsähallitus accused Greenpeace of theft and said that the tree was from a normal forest and had been left standing because of its old age. Metsähallitus also said that the tree had actually crashed over a road during a storm. The incident received publicity in Finland, for example in the large newspapers Helsingin Sanomat and Ilta-Sanomat. Greenpeace replied that the tree had fallen down because the protective forest around it had been clearcut, and that they wanted to highlight the fate of old forests in general, not the fate of one particular tree. Greenpeace also highlighted that Metsähallitus admitted the value of the forest afterwards as Metsähallitus currently refers to Koitajoki as a distinctive area because of its old growth forests.

=== Wilmar International palm-oil issue ===
A 2018 investigation conducted by Greenpeace International found that Wilmar International (the world's largest palm-oil trader) was still linked to forest destruction in the Indonesian province of Papua. The connected company, Gama, run by senior Wilmar executives, had caused deforestation twice the size of Paris. Greenpeace also called Wilmar out for breaking their 2013 commitment to end deforestation, in which they promised to incorporate organic and sustainable ways to collect palm oil. Greenpeace press releases connected Gama-produced palm oil to global brands including Procter & Gamble, Nestlé and Unilever.

=== Resolute Forest Products issue ===
The logging company Resolute Forest Products sued Greenpeace several times since 2013. In 2020, a court in California ordered Resolute to pay US$816,000 to the organization to cover the costs of the legal process after the claims of the company were mostly rejected in one 2019 lawsuit. Greenpeace claims that the activity of the company is hurting the Boreal forest of Canada. Greenpeace claims that Boreal Forests contain even more carbon than Tropical Forests and therefore are very important to protecting the global climate.

== Tokyo Two ==
In 2008, two Greenpeace anti-whaling activists, Junichi Sato and Toru Suzuki, stole a case of whale meat from a delivery depot in Aomori prefecture, Japan. Their intention was to expose what they considered embezzlement of the meat collected during whale hunts. After a brief investigation of their allegations was ended, Sato and Suzuki were charged with theft and trespassing. Amnesty International said that the arrests and following raids on Greenpeace Japan office and homes of five of Greenpeace staff members were aimed at intimidating activists and non-governmental organizations. They were convicted of theft and trespassing in September 2010 by the Aomori District Court.

== Genetically modified organisms (GMOs) ==
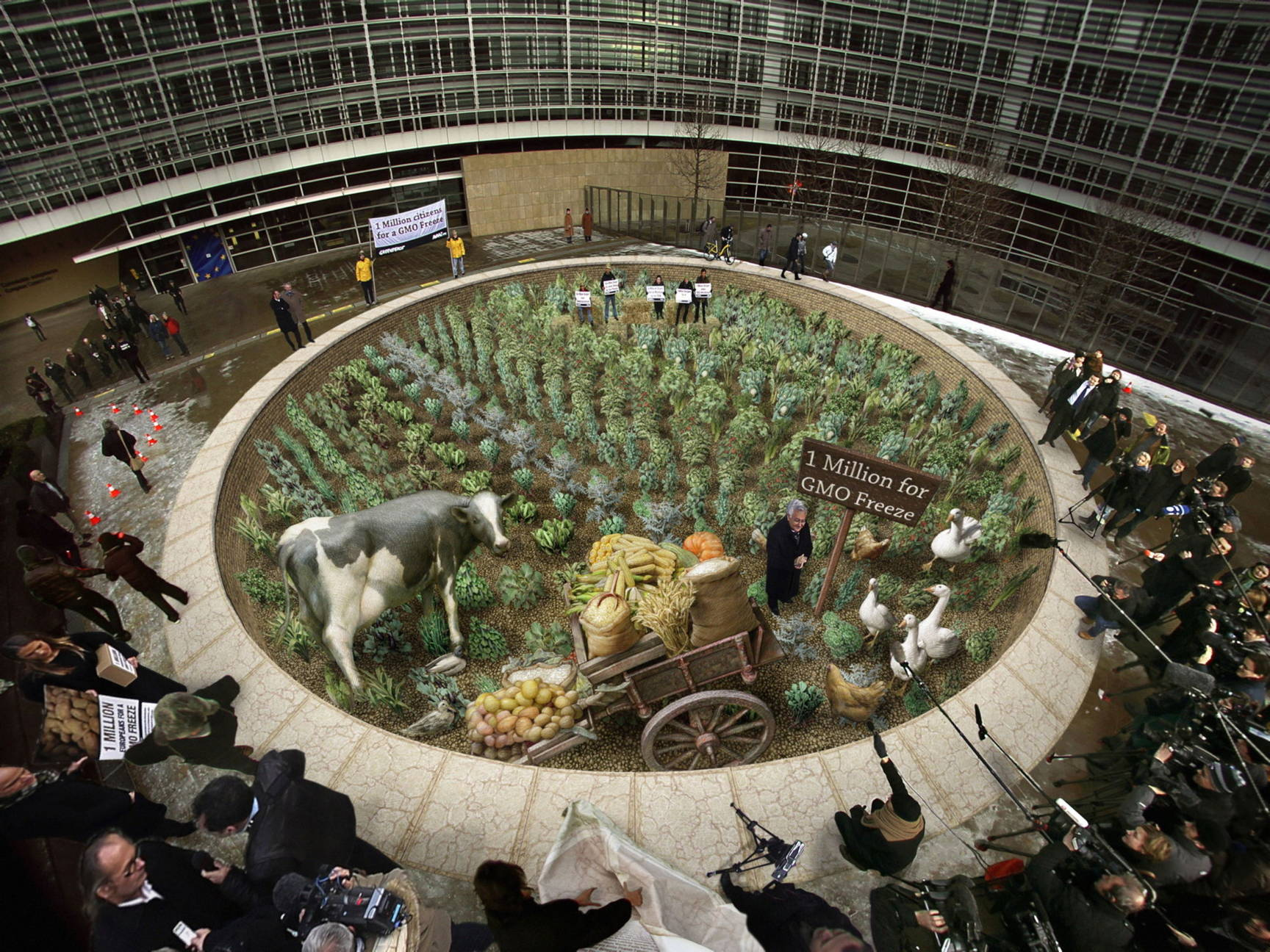
European Union members in Brussels presented with a petition of 1 million signatures against GMO, 2010

Greenpeace has also supported the rejection of GM food from the US in famine-stricken Zambia as long as supplies of non-genetically engineered grain exist, stating that the US "should follow in the European Union's footsteps and allow aid recipients to choose their food aid, buying it locally if they wish. This practice can stimulate developing economies and creates more robust food security", adding that, "if Africans truly have no other alternative, the controversial GE maize should be milled so it can't be planted. It was this condition that allowed Zambia's neighbours Zimbabwe and Malawi to accept it."

After Zambia banned all GM food aid, the former agricultural minister of Zambia criticized, "how the various international NGOs that have spoken approvingly of the government's action will square the body count with their various consciences." Concerning the decision of Zambia, Greenpeace has stated that, "it was obvious to us that if no non-GM aid was being offered then they should absolutely accept GM food aid. But the Zambian government decided to refuse the GM food. We offered our opinion to the Zambian government and, as many governments do, they disregarded our advice."

In 2007 Greenpeace funded research by Gilles-Éric Séralini into MON 863 genetically engineered maize which concluded it caused health issues to the rats used in the study. European Food Safety Authority (EFSA) and French Commission du Génie Biomoléculaire (AFBV) evaluation indicated serious methodological errors in the publication. Further research by Séralini on GMO resulted in widespread criticism of scientific fraud and retractions of his publications.

Also in 2007, Greenpeace similarly publicized results of Árpád Pusztai which were retracted too.

=== Greenpeace on golden rice ===
Greenpeace opposes the planned use of golden rice, a variety of Oryza sativa rice produced through genetic engineering to biosynthesize beta-carotene, a precursor of pro-vitamin A in the edible parts of rice. The addition of beta-carotene to the rice is seen as preventive to loss of sight in poverty stricken countries where golden rice is intended for distribution. According to Greenpeace, golden rice has not managed to do anything about malnutrition for 10 years during which alternative methods are already tackling malnutrition. The alternative proposed by Greenpeace is to discourage monocropping and to increase production of crops which are naturally nutrient-rich (containing other nutrients not found in golden rice in addition to beta-carotene). Greenpeace argues that resources should be spent on programs that are already working and helping to relieve malnutrition. The renewal of these concerns coincided with the publication of a paper in the journal Nature about a version of golden rice with much higher levels of beta carotene. This "golden rice 2" was developed and patented by Syngenta, which provoked Greenpeace to renew its allegation that the project is driven by profit motives and to serve as propaganda aimed at increasing public opinion of GMO products.

Although Greenpeace stated that the golden rice program's true efficiency in treating malnourished populations was its primary concern as early as 2001, statements from March and April 2005 also continued to express concern over human health and environmental safety. In particular, Greenpeace has expressed concern over the lack of safety testing being done on GMO crops such as golden rice and of "playing with the lives of people...using Golden Rice to promote more GMOs". In June 2016, a conglomeration of 107 Nobel Laureates signed an open letter urging Greenpeace to end its campaign against genetically modified crops and Golden Rice in particular. In the letter, they also called upon governments of the world to "do everything in their power to oppose Greenpeace's actions and accelerate the access of farmers to all the tools of modern biology, especially seeds improved through biotechnology." The letter states: "Opposition based on emotion and dogma contradicted by data must be stopped." Greenpeace responded stating that "Accusations that anyone is blocking genetically engineered 'Golden' rice are false" and that they support "investing in climate-resilient ecological agriculture and empowering farmers to access a balanced and nutritious diet, rather than pouring money down the drain for GE 'Golden' rice."

== Toxic waste ==
In July 2011, Greenpeace released its Dirty Laundry report accusing some of the world's top fashion and sportswear brands of releasing toxic waste into China's rivers. The report profiles the problem of water pollution resulting from the release of toxic chemicals associated with the country's textile industry. Investigations focused on industrial wastewater discharges from two facilities in China; one belonging to the Youngor Group located on the Yangtze River Delta and the other to Well Dyeing Factory Ltd. located on a tributary of the Pearl River Delta. Scientific analysis of samples from both facilities revealed the presence of hazardous and persistent hormone disruptor chemicals, including alkylphenols, perfluorinated compounds and perfluorooctane sulfonate. The report goes on to assert that the Youngor Group and Well Dyeing Factory Ltd. (the two companies behind the facilities) have commercial relationships with a range of major clothing brands, including Abercrombie & Fitch, Adidas, Bauer Hockey, Calvin Klein, Converse, Cortefiel, H&M, Lacoste, Li Ning, Metersbonwe Group, Nike, Phillips-Van Heusen, and Puma.

In 2013, Greenpeace launched the "Detox Fashion" campaign, which signed up some fashion brands to stop the discharge of toxic chemicals into rivers as a result of the production of their clothes. Greenpeace's Detox Fashion campaign successfully led to commitments from several global brands to eliminate hazardous chemicals like nonylphenol ethoxylates from their supply chains. The campaign also brought attention to the broader issue of water pollution caused by textile production, urging industry-wide transparency and the adoption of zero-discharge policies.

=== Guide to Greener Electronics ===
In August 2006, Greenpeace released the first edition of Guide to Greener Electronics, a magazine where mobile and PC manufacturers were ranked for their green performance, mainly based on the use of toxic materials in their products and e-waste. In November 2011, the criteria were updated, as the industry had progressed since 2006, with the objective to get companies to set goals for greenhouse gas reduction, the use of renewable power up to 100 percent, producing long-lasting products free of hazardous substances and increasing sustainable practices. To ensure the transparency of the ranking the companies are assessed based only on their public information. For proving companies' policies and practices, Greenpeace uses chemical testing of products, reports from industry observers, media reports and testing of consumer programs to check if they match with their actions. Since the Guide was released in 2006, along with other similar campaigns has driven numerous improvements, when companies ranked eliminate toxic chemicals from their products and improve their recycling schemes. The last published edition of Guide to Greener Electronics was in 2017. The 2017 version included 17 major IT companies and ranked them on three criteria: energy use, resource consumption and chemical elimination.

== Save the Arctic ==
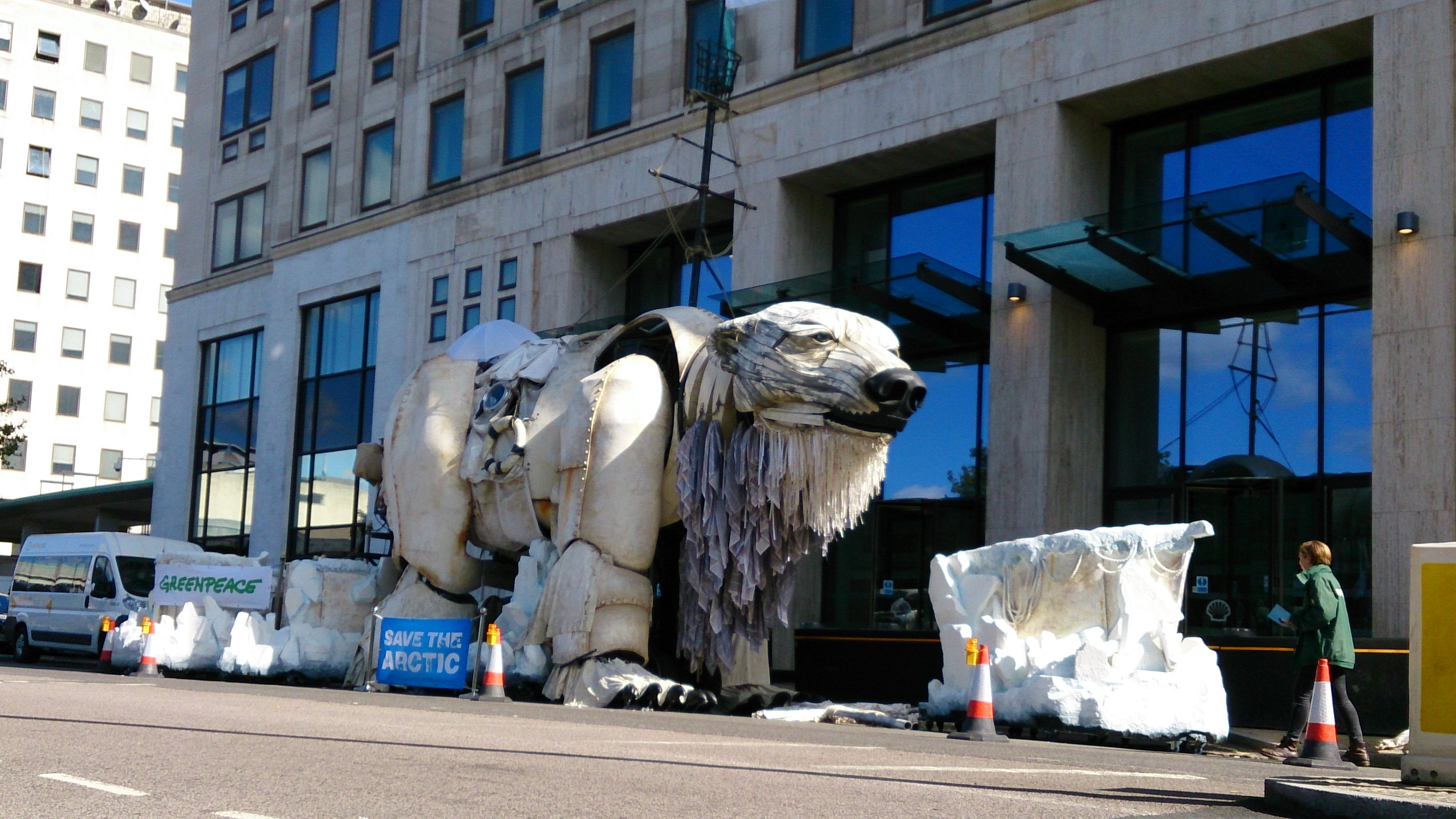
Polar bear outside Shell's office in London in September, 2015

In continuity of the successful campaign to reach the Antarctic-Environmental Protocol, in 2012 and 2013 protests with "Save the Arctic" banners were started. To stop oil- and gas-drilling, industrial fishing and military operations in the Arctic region completely, a "global sanctuary in the high arctic" was demanded from the World leaders at the UN General Assembly: "We want them to pass a UN resolution expressing international concern for the Arctic." A resolution to protect the very vulnerable wildlife and ecosystem. 30 activists from MV Arctic Sunrise were arrested on 19 September 2013 by the Russian Coast Guard while protesting at Gazprom's Prirazlomnaya platform. Greenpeace members were originally charged with piracy, then later downgraded to hooliganism, before being dropped altogether following the passage of an amnesty law by the Russian government.

In July 2014, Greenpeace launched a global boycott campaign to persuade Lego to cease producing toys carrying the oil company Shell's logo in response to Shell's plans to drill for oil in the Arctic. The organisation launched a video with over 9 million views (on YouTube alone) denouncing the impacts of this alliance. The video was entitled "LEGO: Everything is NOT awesome". Lego's partnership with Shell dates back to the 1960s, although the LEGO company created a fictional oil company called Octan. Octan has appeared in countless sets, computer and console games, can be seen at Legoland parks, and is featured as the corporation headed by the villain President Business in The Lego Movie.

=== Norway ===
There is a conflict over oil rigs in the Arctic Ocean between the Norwegian Government and Greenpeace. In 2013, three activists of Greenpeace got on a Statoil's oil rig, wearing bear suits. According to a spokesman from Greenpeace Russia, they stayed on the rig for about three hours. The activists in bear suits "were escorted" to the shore. Statoil reportedly did not intend to file a suit against them. Greenpeace had argued that Statoil's drilling plans posed a threat to Bear Island, an uninhabited wildlife sanctuary that is home to rare species including polar bears, because an oil spill would be nearly impossible to clean up in the Arctic due to the harsh conditions. Greenpeace regards the petroleum activities of Statoil as "illegal". Statoil denies the Greenpeace statement. According to The Maritime Executive (2014), Statoil says "Statoil respects people's right to make a legal protest, and we feel it is important to have a democratic debate around the oil industry. We have established robust plans for the operation, and feel confident they can be carried out safely and without accidents."

On 27 May 2014, Greenpeace's ship, MV Esperanza, took over Transocean Spitsbergen, oil rig of Statoil in the Barents Sea such that it became incapable of operating. After that, the manager of Greenpeace Norway Truls Gulowsen answered a phone interview, stating that "Five protesters left the rig by helicopter last night and three returned to a nearby Greenpeace ship." There were seven more protesters on the rig at the time, but the Norwegian police could not remove them immediately because the rig was a flag of convenience ship registered in the Marshall Islands and thus regarded as a ship in the open sea, as long as it did not begin drilling. On 29 May, however, the seven activists from Greenpeace were peacefully captured by Norwegian police on the rig. Soon after, according to Reuters, all the activists were set free without any fine. On 30 May, the Norwegian Coast Guard finally towed away Esperanza, though in the morning Greenpeace submitted a plea on which more than 80,000 signatures to the Norwegian Environment Minister Tine Sundtoft in Oslo were written. Norwegian government and police reportedly allowed the coast guard to tow the Greenpeace ship.

The Norwegian police stated that Statoil asked Greenpeace to stop preventing its activities, but Greenpeace ignored the warning. The police have stated that Greenpeace's interference with the petroleum activities of Statoil was the contrary to Norwegian law and ordered Greenpeace to leave the Barents Sea site. Statoil said delays to the start of drilling cost the company about $1.26 million per day. According to Reuters, Statoil was slated to begin drilling "three oil wells in the Apollo, Atlantis and Mercury prospects in the Hoop area, [which is] some 300 km away from the mainland [of Norway]" in the summer of 2014. Greenpeace has continued to criticize the big oil company for their "green wash", arguing that Statoil hid the truth that it is doing the risky oil drilling by sponsoring FIRST Lego League and distracting people's attention from the company's project; it also argues that Statoil has to alter its attitude toward environments.

== Moratorium on deep sea mining in international waters ==
Greenpeace has joined with other environmental organizations to call for a moratorium on exploratory deep sea mining authorized by the International Seabed Authority (ISA) under the auspices of the UN Convention on the Law of the Sea (UNCLOS). Greenpeace says exploratory and commercial mining of polymetallic nodules could wreak havoc on the world's oceans, which act as a carbon sink absorbing a quarter of the world's carbon emissions each year. The organization says deep sea mining also disrupts the habitats of newly reported species, from crabs to whales to snails that survive without eating and congregate near bioluminescent thermal vents. Greenpeace has urged the International Seabed Authority to further develop UNCLOS' foundational Article 136 principle "of common heritage to all mankind" to revise regulations and set conservation targets. In a 2018 Greenpeace Research Laboratories report the organization stressed the importance of protecting marine biodiversity from toxins released during seabed mining for natural gas and rare metals for photovoltaic cells.

Greenpeace maintains the "pro-exploitation" ISA is not the appropriate authority to regulate deep sea mining (DSM). In 2019 Greenpeace activists protested outside the annual meeting of the International Seabed Authority in Jamaica, calling for a global ocean treaty to ban deep sea mining in ocean sanctuaries. Some of the activists had sailed to Jamaica aboard Greenpeace's ship, the Esperanza, which travelled from the "Lost City in the mid-Atlantic", an area Greenpeace says is threatened by exploratory mining.

== Alternative economy ==
Greenpeace promotes alternatives to the current economic and social system. According to the organization, the current system is not friendly to people and the planet, so Greenpeace tries to find a better alternative in collaboration with "communities, academics and organisations".

== Ships ==
Since Greenpeace was founded, seagoing ships have played a vital role in its campaigns. Greenpeace has chartered additional ships as needed. At least one non-Greenpeace owned ship was used during the organization's 2008–11 campaign to disrupt trawling in the North Sea by placing large boulders on the seafloor and then providing local authorities with updated charts of where the boulders were placed.

=== In service ===
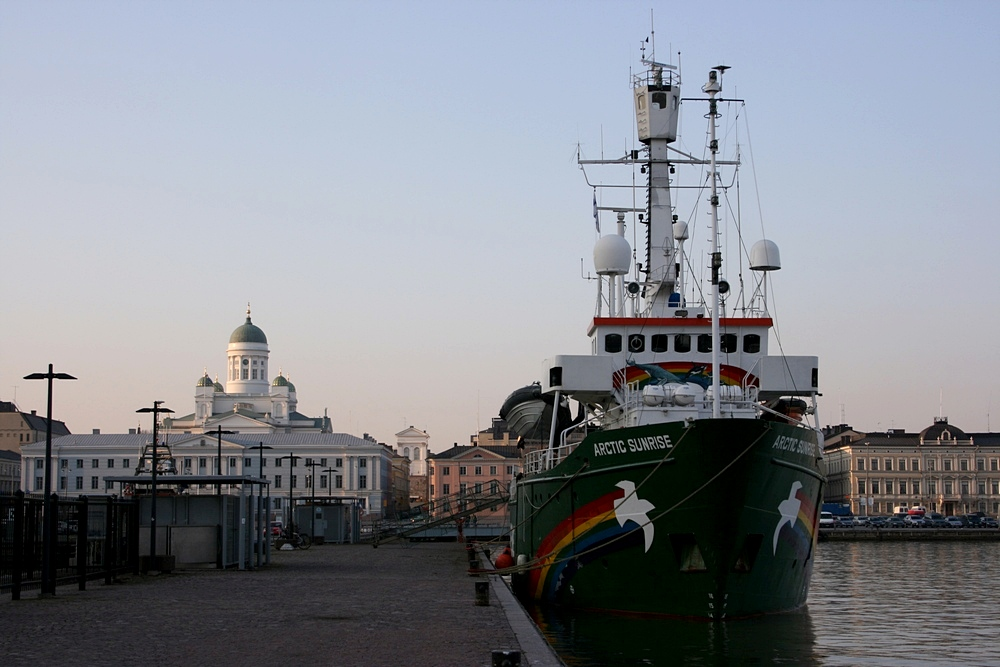
Greenpeace's ship MV Arctic Sunrise in the harbour of Helsinki.

- Rainbow Warrior is the third vessel to bear the name. Launched in 2011, it is sometimes referred to as Rainbow Warrior III.
- MV Arctic Sunrise
- SY Witness

=== Previously in service ===
==== First Rainbow Warrior ====
In 1978, Greenpeace launched the original Rainbow Warrior, a 40-metre (130 ft), former fishing trawler named after the book Warriors of the Rainbow, which inspired early activist Robert Hunter on the first voyage to Amchitka. Greenpeace purchased the Rainbow Warrior (originally launched as the Sir William Hardy in 1955) at a cost of £40,000. Volunteers restored and refitted it over a period of four months. First deployed to disrupt the hunt of the Icelandic whaling fleet, the Rainbow Warrior quickly became a mainstay of Greenpeace campaigns. Between 1978 and 1985, crew members also engaged in direct action against the ocean-dumping of toxic and radioactive waste, the grey seal hunt in Orkney and nuclear testing in the Pacific. In May 1985, the vessel was instrumental for 'Operation Exodus', the evacuation of about 300 Rongelap Atoll islanders whose home had been contaminated with nuclear fallout from a US nuclear test two decades earlier which had never been cleaned up and was still having severe health effects on the locals.

Later in 1985 the Rainbow Warrior was to lead a flotilla of protest vessels into the waters surrounding Moruroa atoll, site of French nuclear testing. The sinking of the Rainbow Warrior occurred when the French government secretly bombed the ship in Auckland harbour on orders from François Mitterrand himself. This killed Dutch freelance photographer Fernando Pereira, who thought it was safe to enter the boat to get his photographic material after a first small explosion, but drowned as a result of a second, larger explosion. The attack was a public relations disaster for France after it was quickly exposed by the New Zealand police. The French Government in 1987 agreed to pay New Zealand compensation of NZ$13 million and formally apologised for the bombing. The French Government also paid ₣2.3 million compensation to the family of the photographer. Later, in 2001, when the Institute of Cetacean Research of Japan called Greenpeace "eco-terrorists", Gert Leipold, then executive director of Greenpeace, detested the claim, saying "calling non-violent protest terrorism insults those who were injured or killed in the attacks of real terrorists, including Fernando Pereira, killed by State terrorism in the 1985 attack on the Rainbow Warrior".

==== Second Rainbow Warrior ====
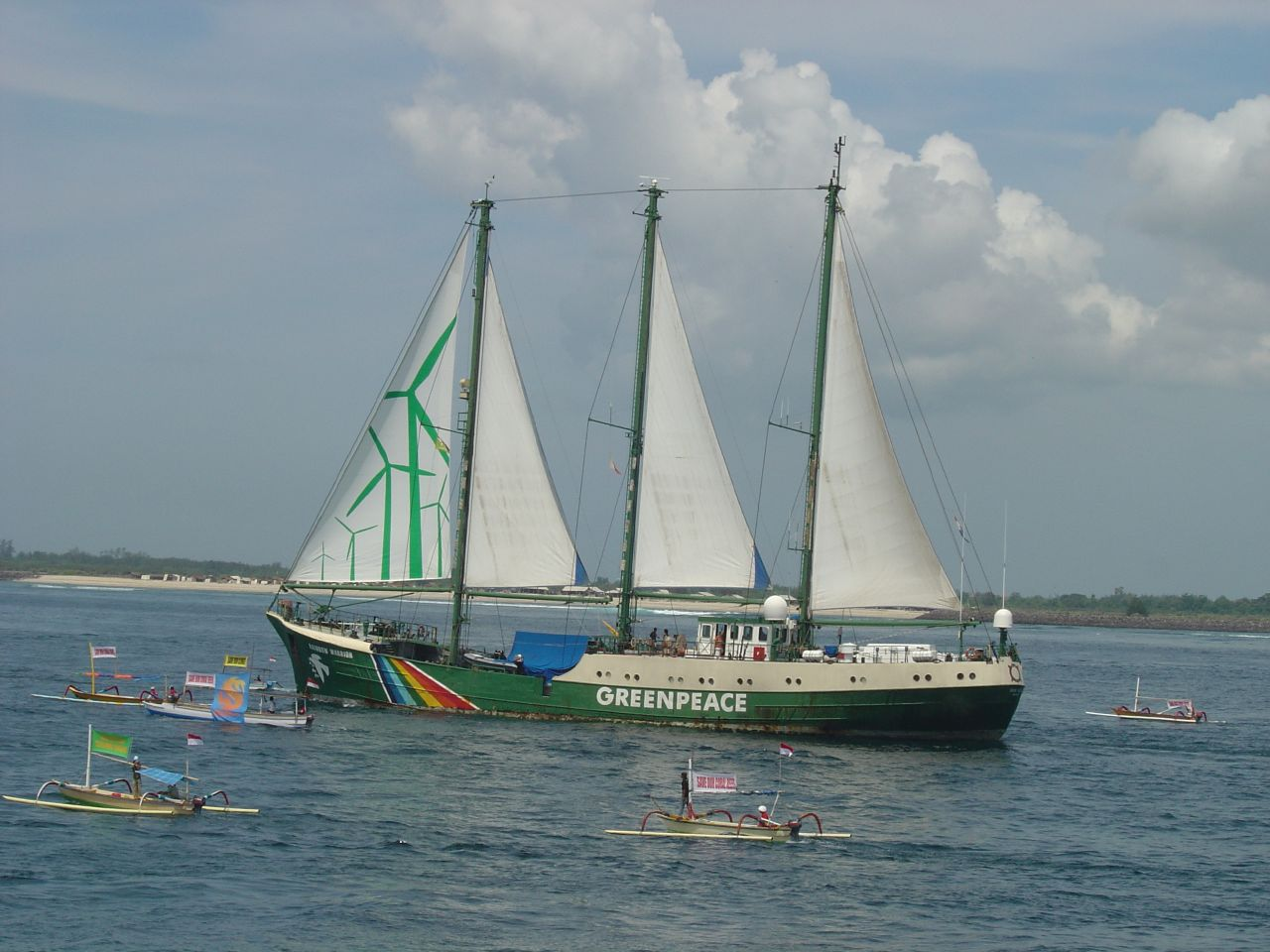
Greenpeace's second Rainbow Warrior ship arrives in Bali for the 2007 UN climate conference.

In 1989 Greenpeace commissioned a replacement Rainbow Warrior vessel, sometimes referred to as Rainbow Warrior II. It retired from service on 16 August 2011, to be replaced by the third generation vessel. In 2005 the Rainbow Warrior II ran aground on and damaged the Tubbataha Reef in the Philippines while inspecting the reef for coral bleaching. Greenpeace was fined US$7,000 for damaging the reef and agreed to pay the fine saying they felt responsible for the damage, although Greenpeace stated that the Philippines government had given it outdated charts. The park manager of Tubbataha appreciated the quick action Greenpeace took to assess the damage to the reef.

==== Others ====
- MV Sirius
- MV Solo
- MV Greenpeace
- MV Gondwana
- MV Beluga (in German)
- MV Esperanza

== Reactions and responses to Greenpeace activities ==
Lawsuits have been filed against Greenpeace for lost profits, reputation damage, and "sailormongering". The latter case, brought under a law not prosecuted since 1890, was widely viewed as an attempt at revenge by the Bush administration for Greenpeace's criticism of its environmental policies. The case was dismissed when the prosecution rested, having failed to prove its case. In 2004 it was revealed that the Australian government was willing to offer a subsidy to Southern Pacific Petroleum on the condition that the oil company would take legal action against Greenpeace, which had campaigned against the Stuart Oil Shale Project. In March 2024, a lawsuit of Total, following Greenpeace publication about the underestimate of Total's GHG emissions in 2019, was dismissed in the Parisian court. Greenpeace said the decision is important because there are other similar cases pending in courts.

Some corporations, such as Royal Dutch Shell, BP, and Électricité de France have reacted to Greenpeace campaigns by spying on Greenpeace activities and infiltrating Greenpeace offices. Greenpeace activists have also been targets of phone tapping, death threats, violence and even state terrorism in the case of the bombing of the Rainbow Warrior. On 19 May 2023, Russia's Prosecutor-General's Office designated Greenpeace as an undesirable organisation, accusing it of interfering with Russia's internal affairs, undermining the country's economy, and financing the activities of Russian organizations recognized as "foreign agents".

Both Greenpeace and the World Wildlife Fund (WWF) have been banned in Russia since 2023. Like WWF, Greenpeace has been declared an "undesirable organization" by the Russian government.

== Criticism ==
=== By Patrick Moore ===
Patrick Moore, an early Greenpeace member, left the organization in 1986 when it, according to Moore, decided to support a universal ban on chlorine in drinking water. Moore has argued that Greenpeace today is motivated by politics rather than science and that none of his "fellow directors had any formal science education". Bruce Cox, Director of Greenpeace Canada, responded that Greenpeace has never demanded a universal chlorine ban and that Greenpeace does not oppose use of chlorine in drinking water or in pharmaceutical uses, adding that "Mr. Moore is alone in his recollection of a fight over chlorine and/or use of science as his reason for leaving Greenpeace." Paul Watson, an early member of Greenpeace has said that Moore "uses his status as a so-called co-founder of Greenpeace to give credibility to his accusations. I am also a co-founder of Greenpeace and I have known Patrick Moore for 35 years. ... Moore makes accusations that have no basis in fact."

Patrick Moore reversed his position on nuclear power in 1976, first opposing it and now supporting it. In Australian newspaper The Age, he writes "Greenpeace is wrong—we must consider nuclear power". He argues that any realistic plan to reduce reliance on fossil fuels or greenhouse gas emissions needs increased use of nuclear energy. Phil Radford, executive director of Greenpeace US responded that nuclear energy is too risky, takes too long to build to address climate change, and claims that most countries, including the U.S., could shift to nearly 100% renewable energy while phasing out nuclear power by 2050. In 2013, Moore criticized Greenpeace's stance on golden rice, an issue where Moore has been joined by other environmentalists such as Mark Lynas, stating that Greenpeace has "waged a campaign of misinformation, trashed the scientists who are working to bring Golden Rice to the people who need it, and supported the violent destruction of Golden Rice field trials."

=== Brent Spar tanker ===
An editorial comment in natural science journal Nature accused Greenpeace of not caring for facts when it criticized the dumping of the Brent Spar tanker, and accused the group of exaggerating the volume of oil that was stored in the tanker. Greenpeace had claimed that the tanker contained 5,500 tonnes of crude oil, while Shell estimated it only contained 50 tonnes. However, the measurements had been made under duress during a protest occupation of the platform, since Shell had refused permission, and Greenpeace activists had been under attack by water cannons and the like. The BBC issued an apology to Greenpeace for having reported that the NGO lied.

Shell UK took three years to evaluate the disposal options, concluding that the disposal of the tanker in the deep ocean was the "Best Practicable Environmental Option" (BPEO), an option which gained some support within some portion of the scientific community, as it was found by some to be of "negligible" environmental impact. British government and Oslo and Paris Commissions (OSPAR) accepted the solution.

The resulting NGO campaign against Shell's proposals included letters, boycotts which escalated to vandalism in Germany, and lobbying at intergovernmental conferences. Binding moratoriums supporting Greenpeace's, ecosystem protection, and the precautionary principle position were issued in more than one intergovernmental meeting, and at the 1998 OSPAR Convention, WWF presented a study of toxic effects on deep sea ecosystems. The meeting confirmed a general prohibition on ocean dumping. Shell had transported the rig to the dumping site, but in the last hours canceled the operation and announced that it had failed in communicating its plans sufficiently to the public, admitting they had underestimated the strength of public opinion. In January 1998, Shell issued a new BPEO indicating recycling the rig as a quay in Norway.

In 1999, the Brent Spar container was decommissioned and one side issue that emerged was that the legs of the structure were found to contain cold-water coral species (Lophelia pertusa). As a result, the possibility was suggested of keeping the legs of such platforms on the sea bed in future, to serve as habitat. A Greenpeace representative opposed the suggestion, citing the fact that the reefs formed by the coral are at risk, not the coral itself, and that such a move would not promote development of such reefs, and expose coral species to toxic substances found in oil. "If I was to dump a car in a wood, moss would grow on it, and if I was lucky a bird may even nest in it. But this is not justification to fill our forests with disused cars," said Greenpeace campaigner Simon Reddy.

=== Pascal Husting commute ===
In 2013 reports noted that Pascal Husting, the director of Greenpeace International's "international programme" was commuting 400 km (250 mi) to work by plane, despite Greenpeace's activism to reduce air travel due to carbon footprint. Greenpeace has said "the growth in aviation is ruining our chances of stopping dangerous climate change". After a "public uproar" Greenpeace announced that Husting would commute by train.

=== Nazca Lines ===
In December 2014, Greenpeace activists damaged rock related to the Nazca Lines in Peru while setting up a banner within the lines of one of the famed geoglyphs, and there were concerns that the harm might be irreparable. The activists damaged an area around the hummingbird by walking near the glyph without regulation footwear. Access to the area around the lines is strictly prohibited and special shoes must be worn to avoid damaging the UN World Heritage site. Greenpeace said the activists were "absolutely careful to protect the Nazca lines," but this is contradicted by video and photographs showing the activists wearing conventional shoes (not special protective shoes) while walking on the site.

Greenpeace has apologized to the Peruvian people, but Loise Jamie Castillo, Peru's Vice Minister of Cultural Heritage called the apology "a joke", because Greenpeace refused to identify the vandals or accept responsibility. Culture Minister Diana Álvarez-Calderón said that evidence gathered during an investigation by the government will be used as part of a legal suit against Greenpeace. At a news conference, she said: "The damage done is irreparable and the apologies offered by the environmental group aren't enough." By January 2015, Greenpeace had presented statements of four members of the NGO involved in the action.

=== Anti-whaling campaign in Norway in the 1990s ===
During the 1990s Greenpeace conducted many anti-whaling expeditions in Norway. Critics have said that Greenpeace only campaigned against whaling to gain economic donations from the U.S., and it had little to do with saving the environment or the lives of the whales. For example, shark hunting was a more pressing issue at the time, but since sharks are widely feared in the United States, activism to help sharks does not receive as much financial support. Greenpeace has rejected this claim. However, in Norwegian newspaper Dagbladet on 11 April 2015, then–International Executive Director Kumi Naidoo admitted that the anti-whaling campaign was a "miscalculation." Greenpeace holds that whaling was only resumed by Norway after the IWC ban because of political election motives, and faces many explicit hurdles, including decreased demand in Japan and toxic chemical contamination.

=== Open letter from Nobel laureates ===
In June 2016, 107 Nobel laureates signed an open letter, urging Greenpeace to end its opposition to genetically modified organisms (GMOs). The letter stated:

We urge Greenpeace and its supporters to re-examine the experience of farmers and consumers worldwide with crops and foods improved through biotechnology, recognize the findings of authoritative scientific bodies and regulatory agencies, and abandon their campaign against "GMOs" in general and Golden Rice in particular. Scientific and regulatory agencies around the world have repeatedly and consistently found crops and foods improved through biotechnology to be as safe as, if not safer than those derived from any other method of production. There has never been a single confirmed case of a negative health outcome for humans or animals from their consumption. Their environmental impacts have been shown repeatedly to be less damaging to the environment, and a boon to global biodiversity. ... We call upon governments of the world to... do everything in their power to oppose Greenpeace's actions and accelerate the access of farmers to all the tools of modern biology, especially seeds improved through biotechnology. ... Opposition based on emotion and dogma contradicted by data must be stopped.

Greenpeace responded stating "[a]ccusations that anyone is blocking genetically engineered 'Golden' rice are false" and that they support "investing in climate-resilient ecological agriculture and empowering farmers to access a balanced and nutritious diet, rather than pouring money down the drain for GE 'Golden' rice."

=== Efforts to curb Arctic oil exploration ===
In December 2020, Norway's Supreme Court refused to interfere in the work of ongoing oil exploration endeavors which was challenged jointly by Greenpeace and Nature and Youth Norway on the ground that the activity related to oil explorations violate human rights due to its contributing aspect towards carbon emission. The ruling said that the permission granted during 2016 will remain valid as it was not found to violate either Norwegian Constitution's rights or the European Convention on Human Rights. Greta Thunberg reportedly contributed $29,000 to the lawsuit cost on behalf of the plaintiff Greenpeace and Nature and Youth Norway.

On March 19, 2025, a jury in Mandan, North Dakota, ruled that Greenpeace must pay Energy Transfer nearly $667 million. During the construction of the Dakota Access Pipeline in North Dakota in 2016-2017, protests took place near the Standing Rock Indian Reservation. Energy Transfer and its subsidiary Dakota Access sued Greenpeace International, Greenpeace USA, and Greenpeace Fund Inc., alleging that they had supported efforts to disrupt construction, committed or aided trespass, and spread false information. Greenpeace USA was found liable on all claims against it, while Greenpeace International and Greenpeace Fund Inc. were found liable on fewer claims. The claims included defamation, conspiracy, and trespass. The damages were divided among the three defendants. Greenpeace denied wrongdoing and said it would appeal the decision.

On February 27, 2026, Judge James Gion in North Dakota finalized the amount of damages at $345 million. Greenpeace had also filed a lawsuit against Energy Transfer in the Netherlands under a law designed to prevent lawsuits aimed at harassing or silencing activists.

== Archives ==
There is a Greenpeace Canada fonds at Library and Archives Canada. Archival reference number is R4377.

== Gallery ==
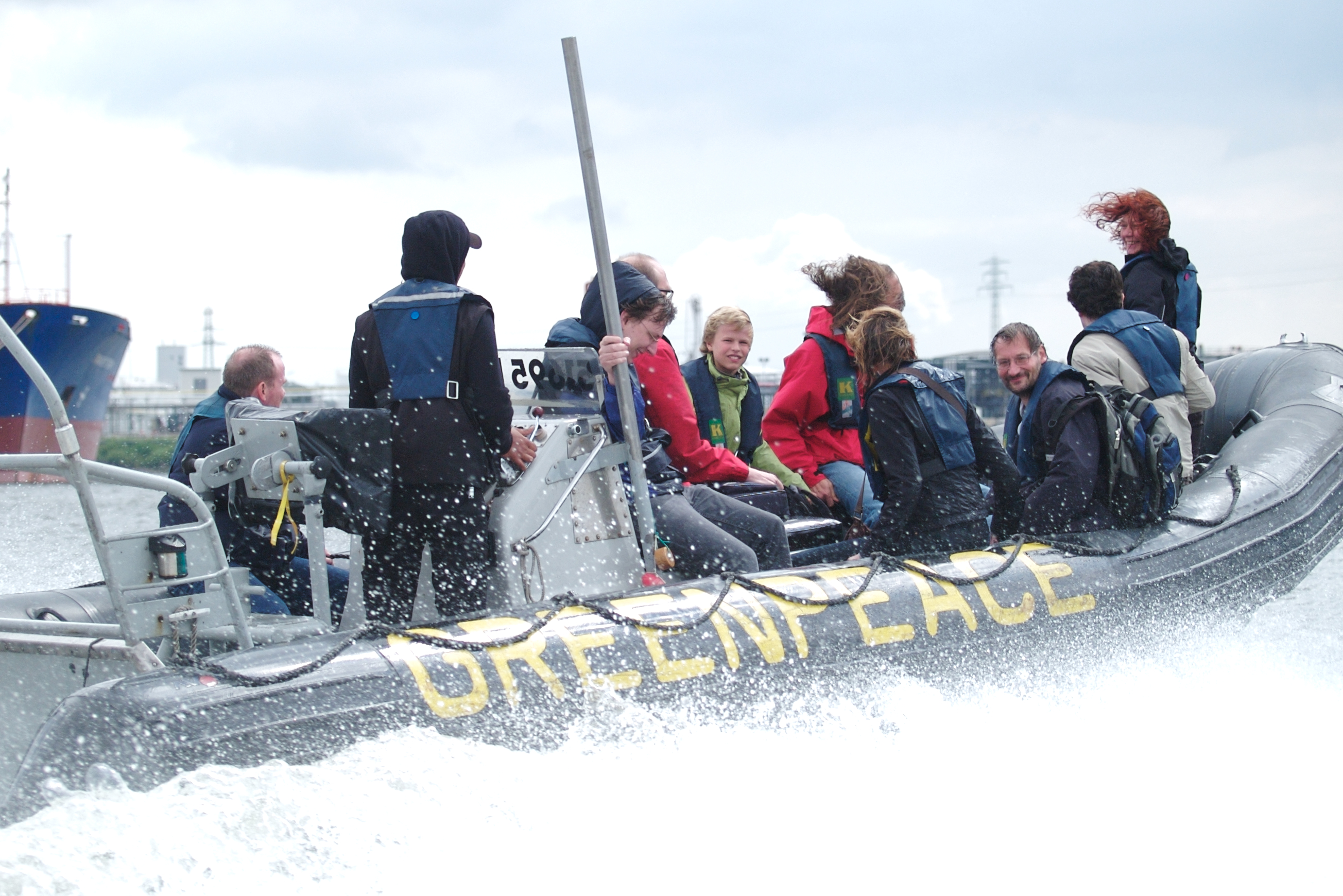
Greenpeace boat on the Elbe, Hamburg, Germany, 2007

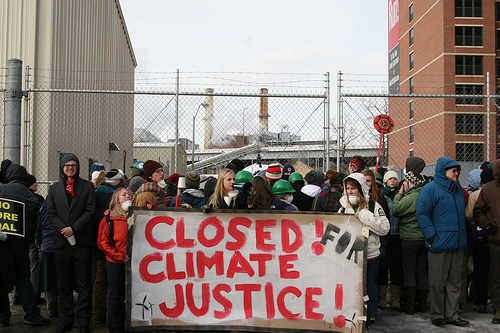
Coal protest in Canada, 2009

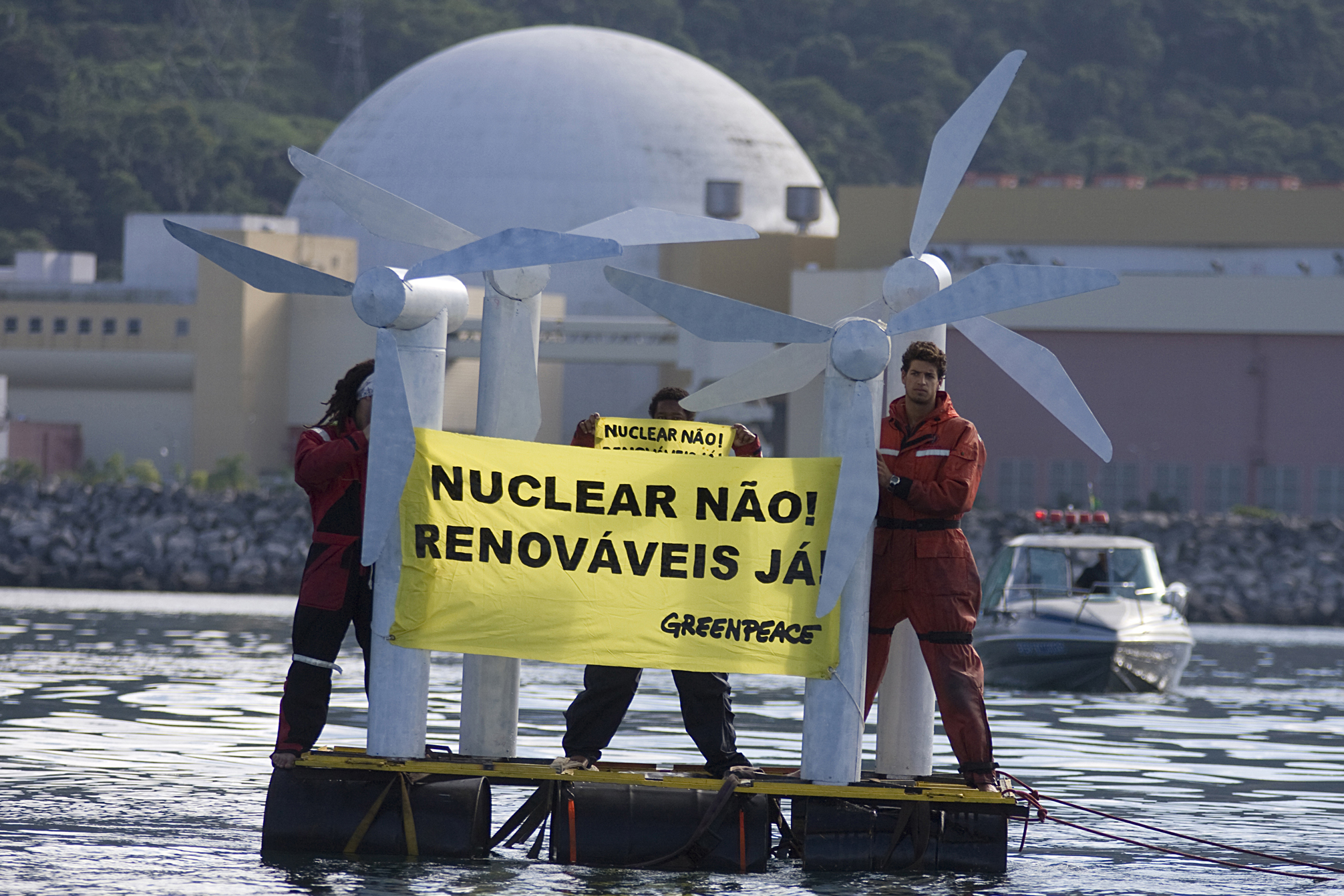
Anti-nuclear demonstration, Rio de Janeiro, 2009

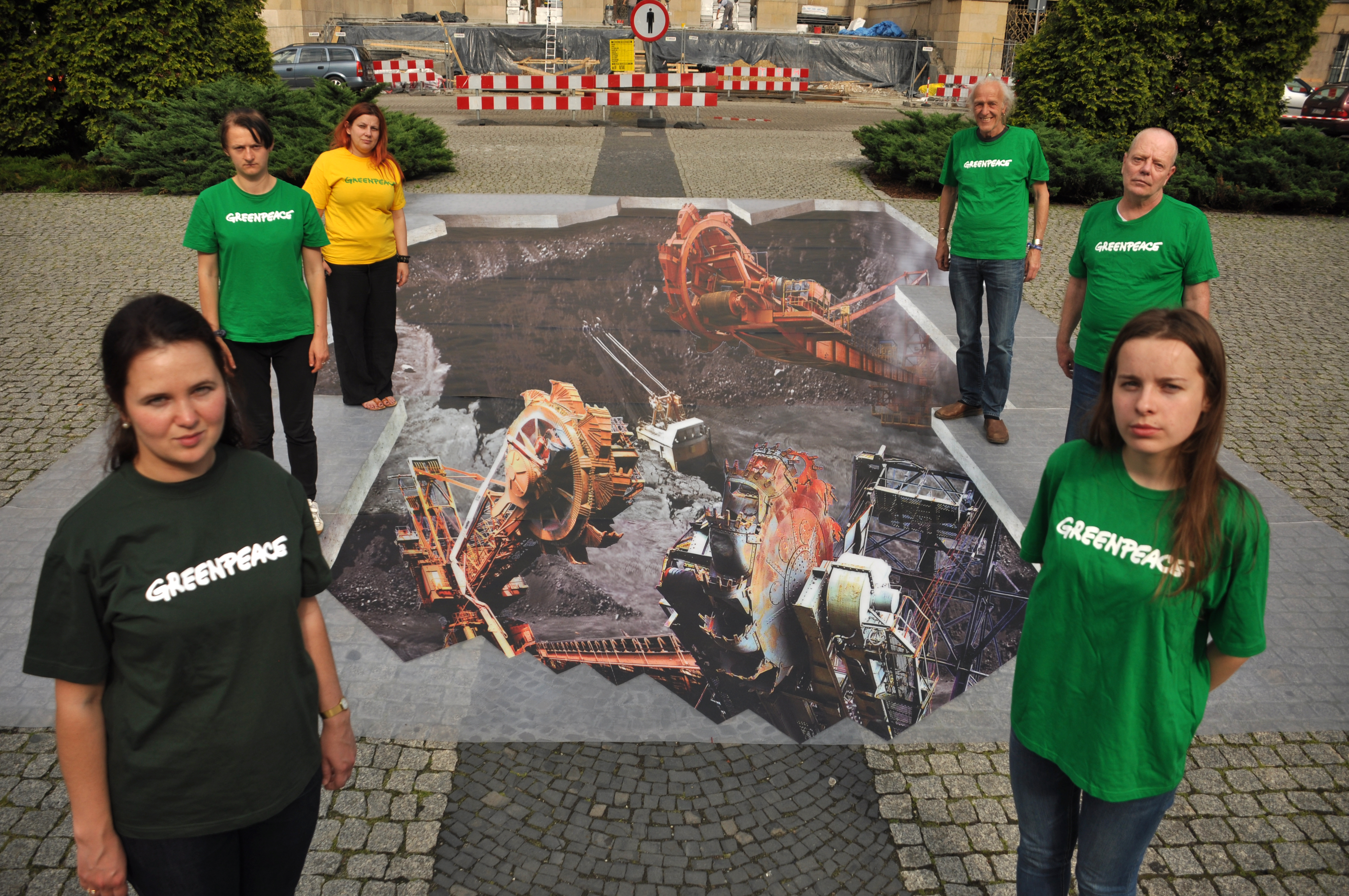
Activists in Poland against an open pit mine, 2014

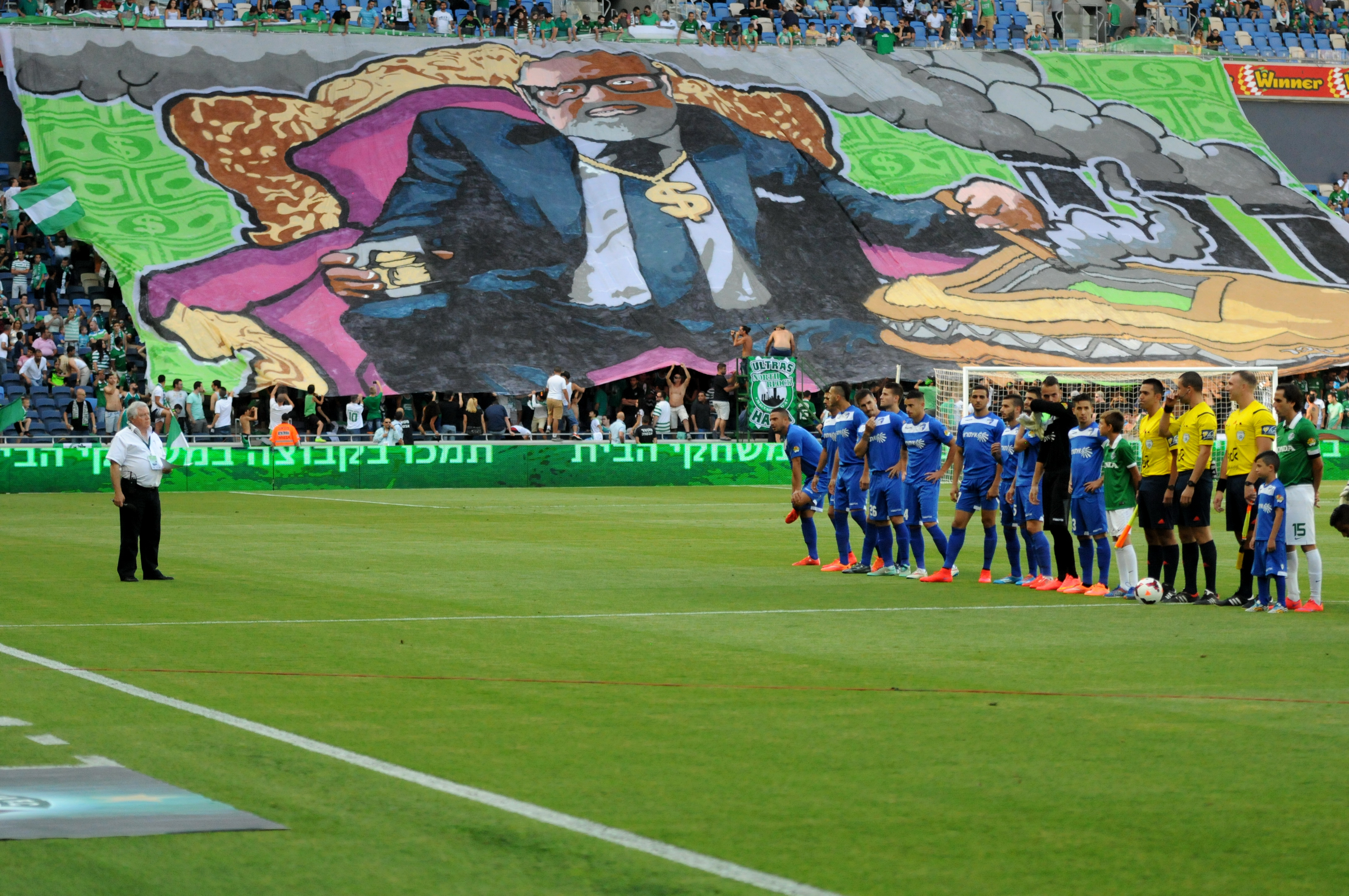
Greenpeace Israel in action against pollution, 2015

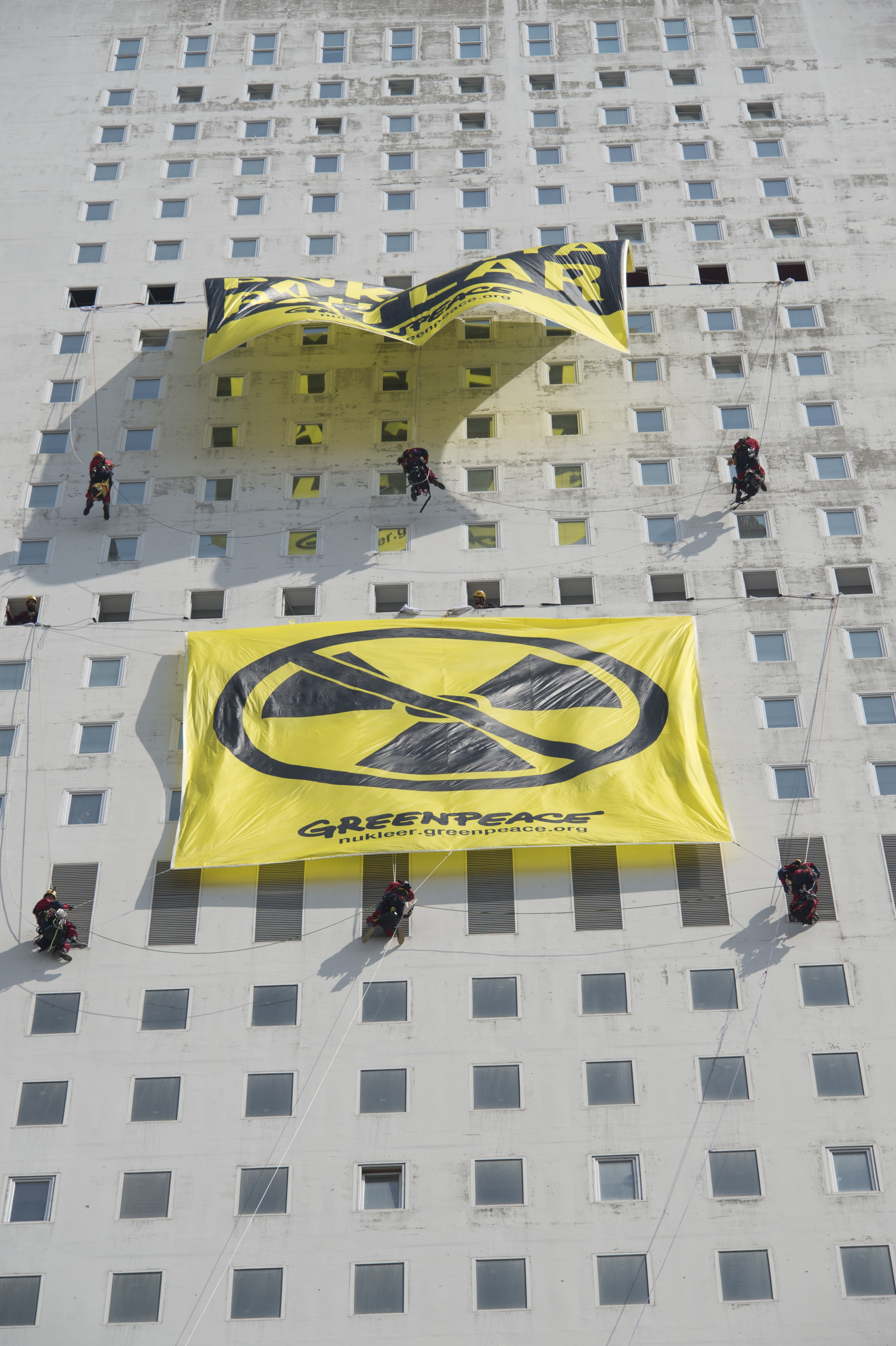
Nuclear protest in Turkey, 2015

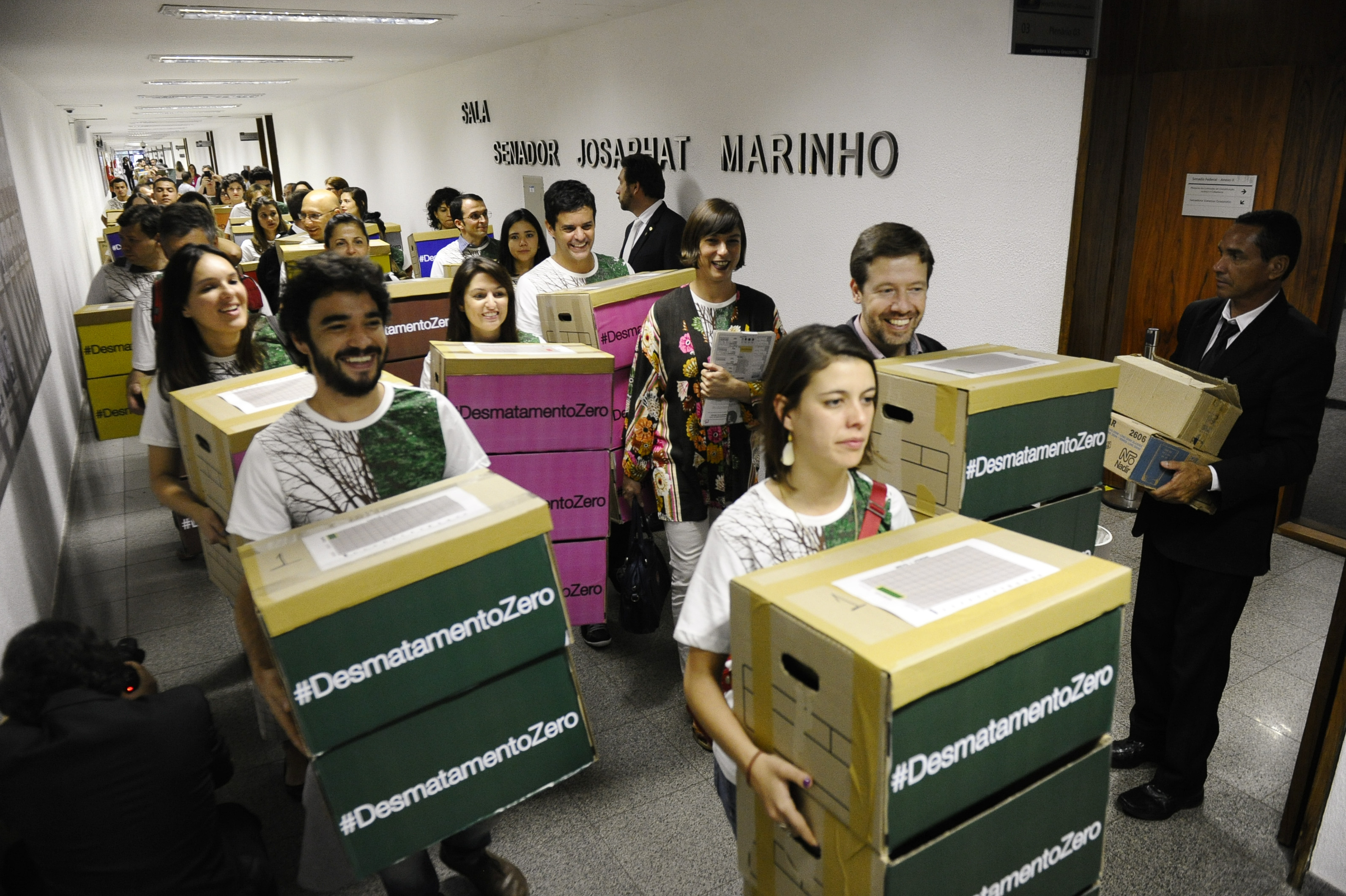
Legislative hearing on deforestation in Brasil, 2015

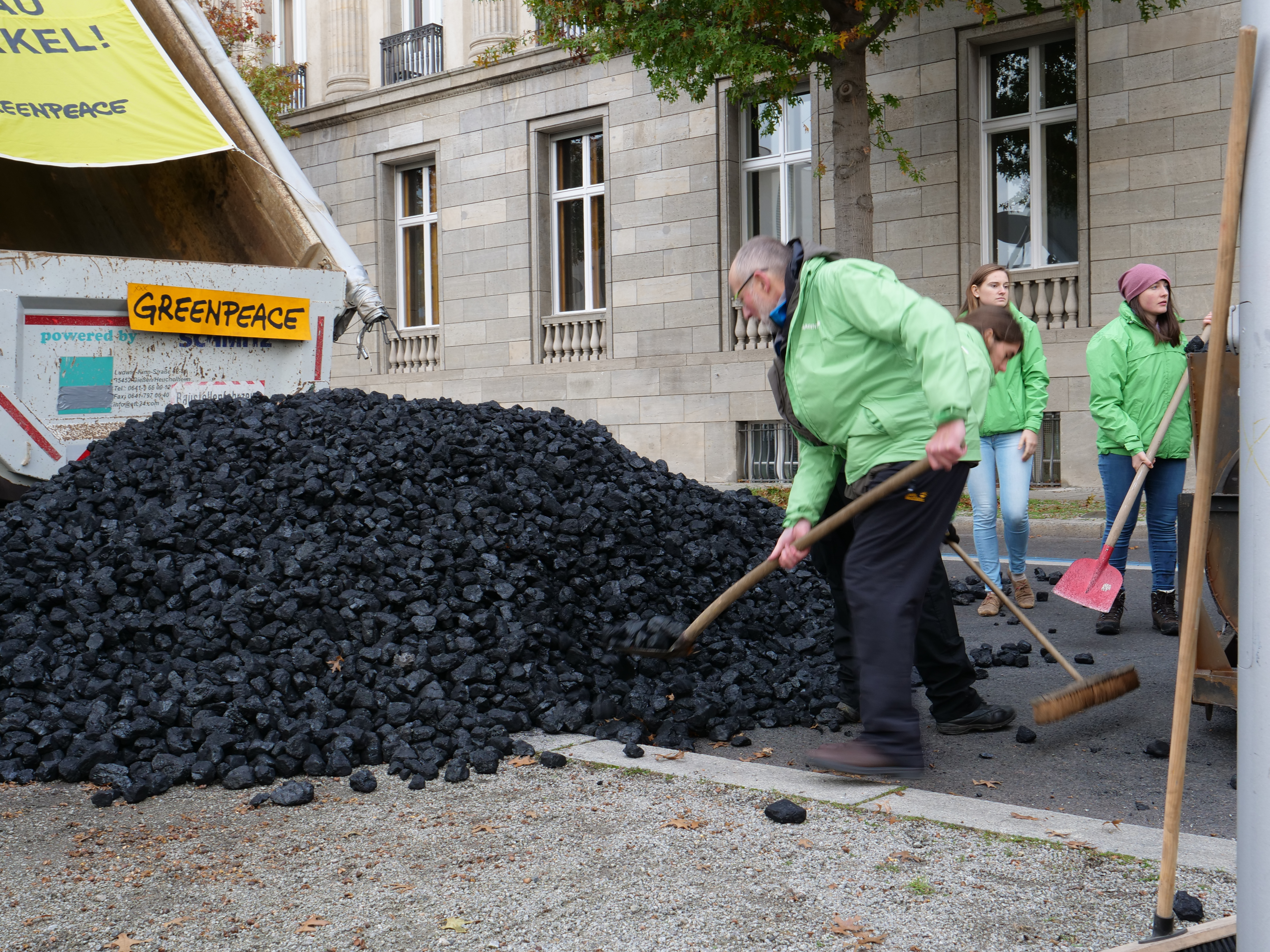
Protest with coal in front of the German Chancellery, 2017

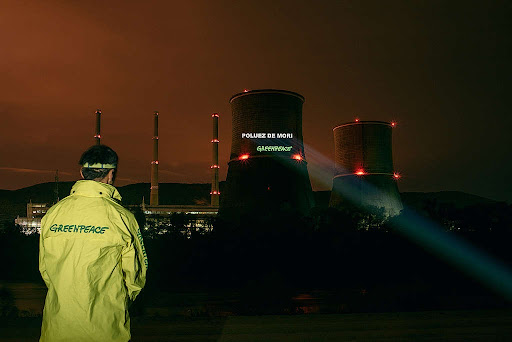
Romanian nuclear protest, 2017

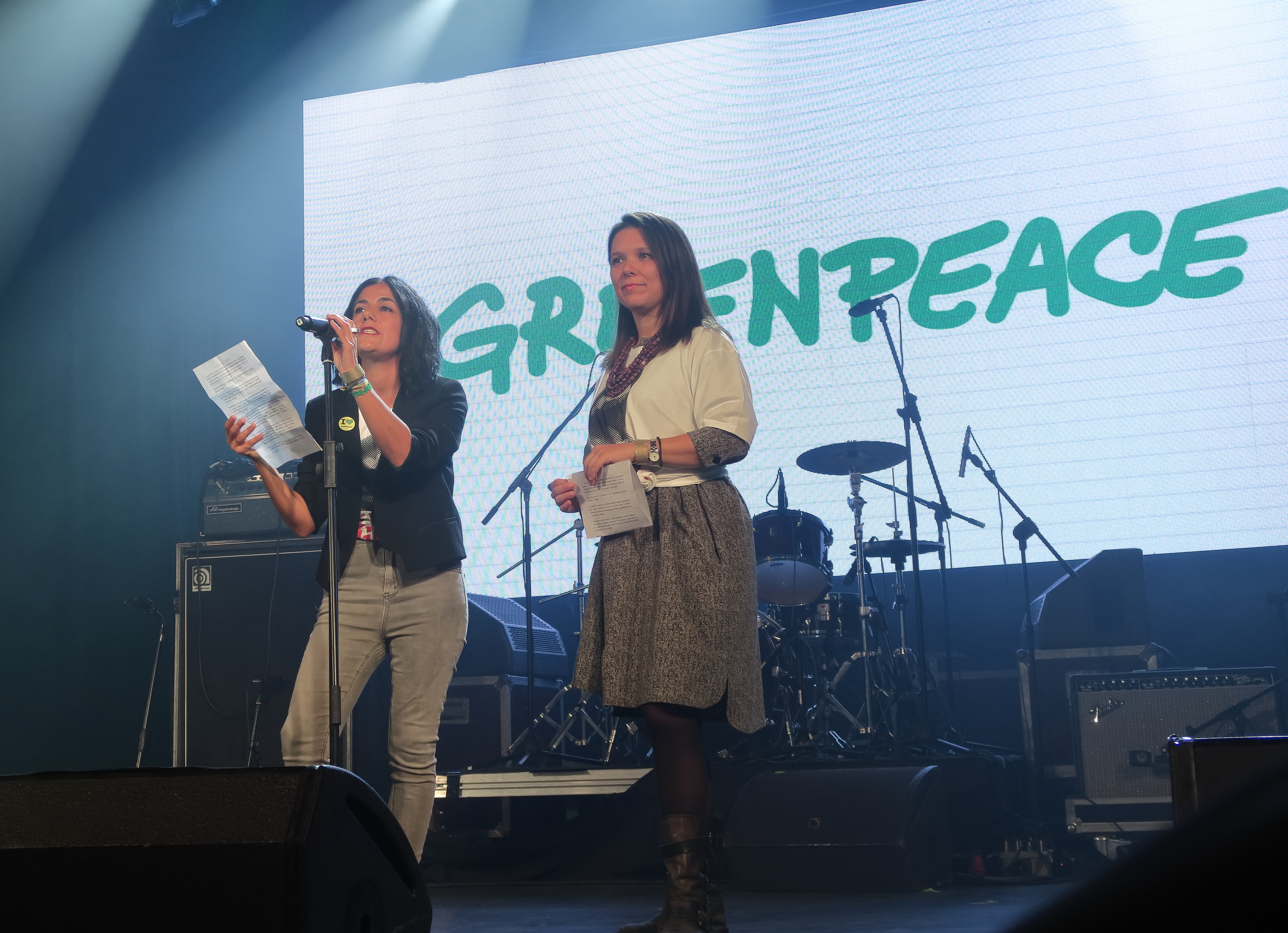
Women in Concert for the Energy Revolution, Sala la Riviera, Madrid 2018

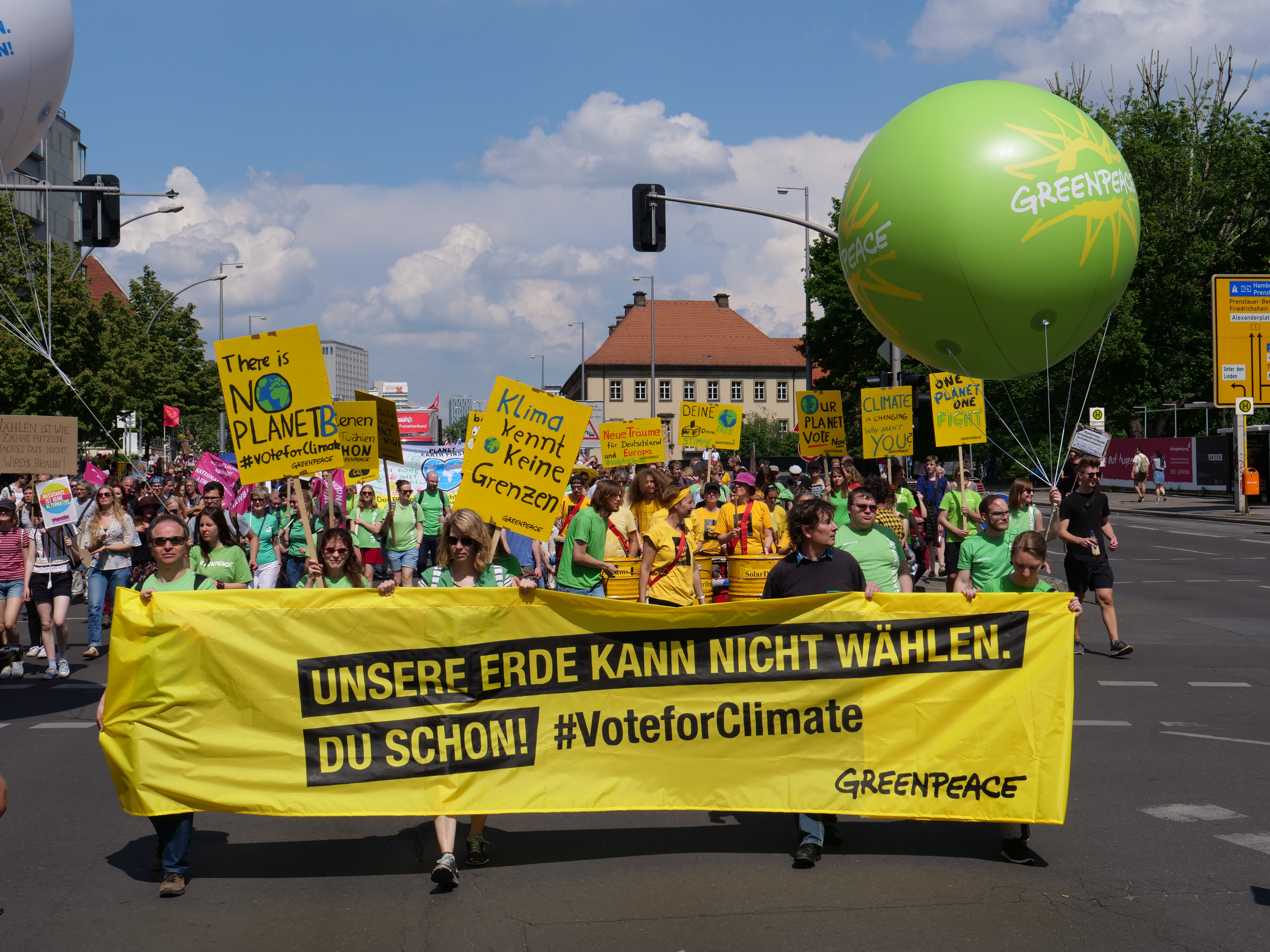
Demonstration in Berlin, 2019

== See also ==
- 1971 in the environment
- 350.org
- Climate Reality Project
- Climate Clock
- European Renewable Energy Council
- Friends of Nature
- Fund for Wild Nature
- How to Change the World (2015 documentary film about Greenpeace)
- List of years in the environment
- Sea Shepherd Conservation Society
- World Wide Fund for Nature
- Greenpeace USA
- Greenpeace Australia Pacific
- Pete Bethune
