= MV Sirius =

Greenpeace ship

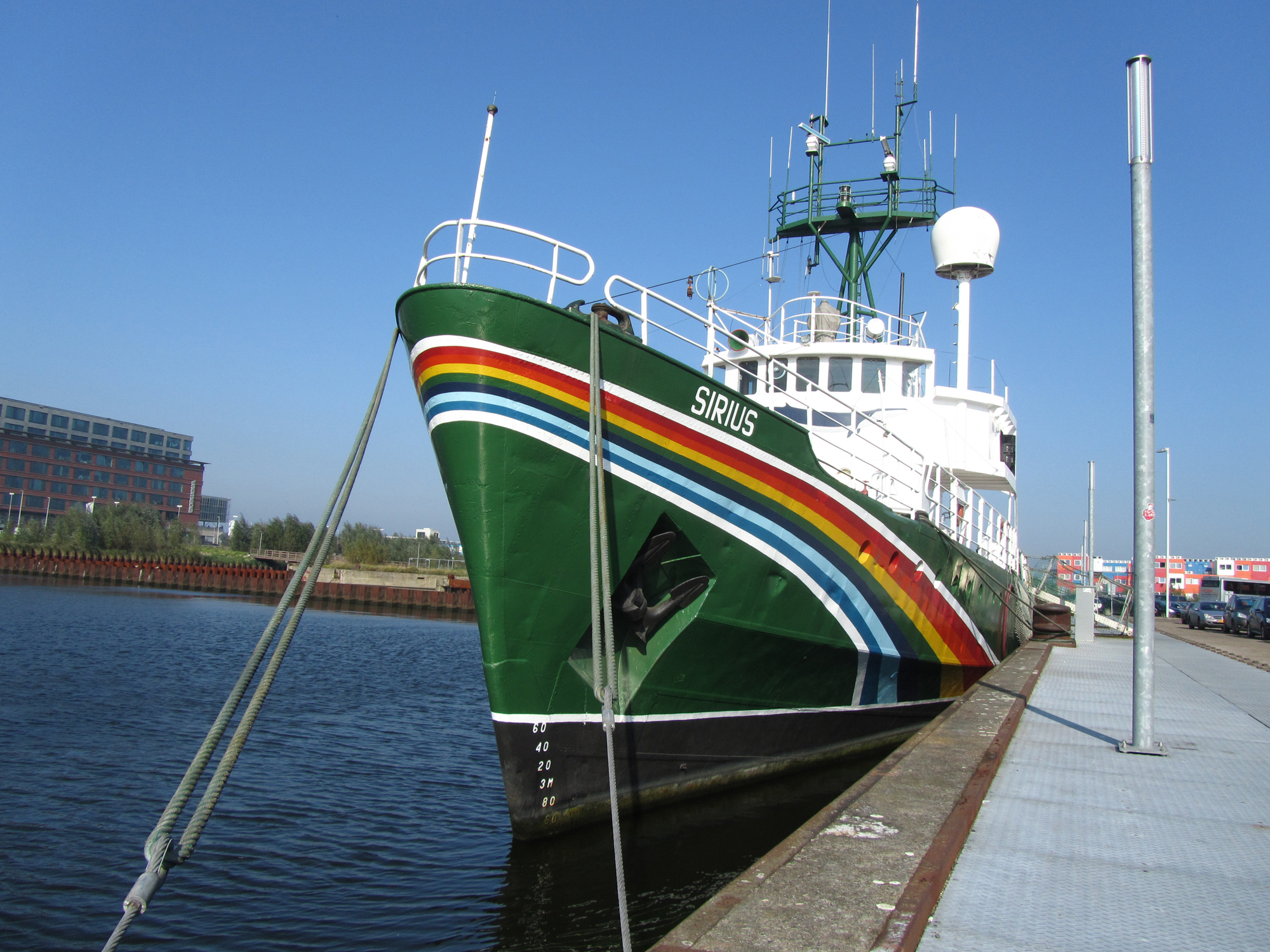
- MV Sirius berthed at Amsterdam

History

Netherlands
- Name: Sirius
- Builder: Boele Shipyard
- Cost: 2.5 million euro
- Laid down: 1950
- Fate: Sold to Greenpeace in 1981

Greenpeace
- Name: Sirius
- Owner: Greenpeace
- Operator: Greenpeace
- Port of registry: Amsterdam, Netherlands
- Acquired: 1981
- Out of service: 1996
- Identification: IMO number: 8837461
- Fate: Sold for scrap, January 2018

General characteristics
- Tonnage: 440 GT
- Length: 46 m (150 ft 11 in)
- Beam: 8.43 m (27 ft 8 in)
- Draft: 3.01 m (9 ft 11 in)
- Installed power: 650 hp (480 kW; 640 hp)
- Propulsion: 1 Smit MAN 6-cylinder diesel engine
- Speed: 9–12 knots (17–22 km/h; 10–14 mph)

MV Sirius was a Greenpeace ship named after the star Sirius. The Sirius was built with modern specifications at the Boele shipyard in the Netherlands in 1950 as one of seven pilot vessels. The ship, originally owned by the Royal Dutch Navy, was sold to Greenpeace during 1981 while in dry dock. The ship was refitted, repaired, and repainted. It took ten weeks to paint her. The ship's colour scheme was soon changed to a green hull and rainbow colours and a white dove of peace with an olive branch was painted on the bow. Sirius was refitted with more modern navigation systems, communication equipment, lifeboats, and rafts. The pantries were turned into outdoor engine rooms and the mess room became a storage room.

Sirius served as the flagship of Greenpeace Netherlands through 1998, after which she was retired. Until 2018 she was docked at Amsterdam, where she serves in an educational capacity, offering shipboard tours and environmental education.

At around midnight on September 30–31, 1988, while on passage from Cabrera to Barcelona, Sirius was forced to seek shelter in Mallorca during a Force 9 severe gale. After turning the vessel, the crew sighted distress flares eight miles (13 km) from Dragonera Island. Sirius set course for the flares, and a small sailing yacht was found to be sinking. One of her four British crew was missing overboard, but two young men were rescued. The yacht's master went down with the yacht when it sank during the rescue. Sirius continued to search for the missing men and then took the two survivors to Port D'Andratx when she was relieved by a navy patrol boat and a tug sent from Palma.

On 10 January 2018 Sirius was towed from Zaandam to Haarlem to be scrapped.

== See also ==
- MV Greenpeace
