= Sailormongering =

Sailormongering is the practice of boarding a ship approaching or newly arrived in port without the permission of its master, and inciting members of its crew to desert their posts and come ashore by tempting them with prostitutes and alcohol. The intention behind the activity might be to subject the unguarded vessel to piracy, hold the inebriated sailors hostage or simply drum up business for local taverns and brothels. At the time when the practice was common, it was often accomplished by sending prostitutes carrying large quantities of alcohol onto the targeted ships to serve as lures; those arranging for this to occur might be described as having committed the action in addition to those actually boarding the ships.

Although statutory prohibitions on the practice remain in jurisdictions such as the United States, the offence is effectively obsolete. The relevant law in that country dates from 1872, but the last successful prosecution under it occurred in 1890, in the case of United States v Sullivan.

== Greenpeace charge ==
In April 2002 Greenpeace activists boarded the container ship APL Jade, carrying a shipment of illegal Brazilian mahogany at a Miami port, calling on President Bush to return all mahogany shipments from Brazil and to investigate companies that continue to buy it. Twelve individuals were arrested and six Greenpeace activists were charged with sailormongering and sentenced to time served.

One year later in 2003, the United States Justice Department prosecuted Greenpeace under the same 1872 statute for boarding the APL Jade that was importing over $10 million worth of Brazilian mahogany. The case garnered widespread ridicule and was dismissed on the third day of the trial, after one and a half days of testimony.

The Greenpeace Mahogany campaign ended when the Convention on International Trade in Endangered Species (CITES) listed Bigleaf mahogany (Swietenia macrophylla) on Appendix II at CoP12 in Santiago, Chile.
