= Public Interest Watch =

Public Interest Watch (PIW) was established in September 2002 by Mike Hardiman. The PIW website states that the group was created "in response to the growing misuse of charitable funds by nonprofit organizations and the lack of effort by government agencies to deal with the problem." In March 2006 the Wall Street Journal reported that PIW received approximately 95% of its funding from ExxonMobil during the fiscal year ended July 31, 2004.

== History ==
PIW claims that it "works to fight charitable trust abuse by exposing individual cases of abuse and advocating for stronger governmental oversight, including requirements for greater financial disclosure by charitable organizations".

In comments to the IRS on possible changes to information required to be disclosed on Form 990 for non-profit groups, PIW flagged some changes it wanted. US citizens, taxpayers and shareholders "are entitled to know as much about the tax-exempt entities to which the federal government provides tax subsidies, contracts or access to policy debates as they do about publicly traded corporations," they wrote. Key changes they sought to achieve this included:

- requiring non-profits to submit with their annual return copies of all fundraising materials as a way of potentially facilitating early legal actions - such as for misleading promotion, libel, trade libel or "tortious interference"
- provide a list of individual financial contributors and the total annual contributions
- disclose grants to overseas organizations or individuals
- publish decision-making processes
- file quarterly financial returns

PIW's proposals echo the views advanced by Gary Johns from the Australian corporate think-tank, the Institute of Public Affairs at an American Enterprise Institute seminar. In particular, PIW proposed tax-exempt organizations disclose the "(i) the nature and extent of its claims to expertise, other than membership interest; (ii) the qualifications of those who will speak or act on behalf of the organization; (iii) the research undertaken by the tax-exempt organization; and (iv) whether the research has been assessed by independent peer review."

In September 2003 PIW complained to the Internal Revenue Service claiming that Greenpeace tax returns were inaccurate and breached the law. PIW asked the IRS to investigate the complaint.

In a column filed with the Copley News Service Doug Bandow, a senior fellow at the Cato Institute and James Madison Scholar with the American Legislative Exchange Council, while conceding the Greenpeace had a right to advocate its beliefs, railed against non-profit groups having a tax-deductible 501c(3) entity that can transfer funds to a non-deductible 501 c (4) entity. "What they shouldn't be able to do is manipulate the tax system to advance their agenda," Bandow complained. Bandow endorsed PIW's claim that foundations that provided grants should verify how funds were spent.

PIW's attack on Greenpeace was also taken up by Californian Republican Assemblyman Ray Haynes, who urged that State Attorney-General Lockyer prosecute Greenpeace under various laws, including the state's unfair-business-practice law.

The Public Interest Watch report was also covered by Marc Levin, a lawyer and president of the American Freedom Center. After reviewing a number of incidents of damage to property attributed to the Animal Liberation Front and Earth Liberation Front, Levin sought to equate Greenpeace with ecoterrorism. "While these acts of ecoterror are clearly illegal, few people realize that the money used to commit many of these crimes may have been illegally laundered through tax-exempt organizations whose donors - individuals and nonprofit foundations unaware of the laundering - receive tax deductions," he wrote in the New Jersey Law Journal.

In May 2004 under interim Executive Director Lewis Fein, PIW were targeting Greenpeace once more claiming that they had found what they claimed was the "secret" location of the Greenpeace actions warehouse in Washington, D.C. The media release was picked up by the Washington Times.

In a letter to the editor in the Washington Times, Greenpeace's operations manager, Bill Richardson, ridiculed PIW's claim that the warehouse location was secret. "What extraordinary detective skills it must have taken to notice the mailbox with the name "Greenpeace" on the front of the building. Thanks for the giggle," he wrote.

== Funding ==
In a January 2003 letter to the IRS – as well as on its website – PIW states that it "has been established as a 501(c)4 nonprofit organization, which means contributions to PIW are not tax-deductible." Asked whether PIW had filed an annual return with the IRS since the organisation was formed Fein said "I believe so".

On its website PIW states that "initial funding for PIW has been provided by business organizations".

(For more details on the Internal Revenue Service provisions for non-profits groups - including on the 501c(3) and 501c(4) provisions see The U.S. tax code and non profits).

== Personnel ==
- Lewis Fein, executive director (interim)
- Jim McCarthy, Board member
- Michael Hardiman, founding executive director. Resigned from PIW in January 2004 to work in Iraq as a civilian employee of the Defense Department.

In an interview, Fein said he was unable to disclose who the members of the board of directors were. "With media inquiries when I have been called to discuss the board or the individual members themselves, many are with very well established biographies, I just need to clear it with them," he said.

Nor could Fein comment on whether the street address listed on their website was in fact a residential address and not an office at all. "It is just standard policy that I have to apply. I’m not trying to be evasive or not answer your question. It's just that if the board say its OK to answer these questions then I can get back to you with the information," he said. To date there has been no further information forthcoming by email.
