= Best practicable environmental option =

Optimal decision-making for sustainable goals

In the context of environmental protection, the Best Practicable Environmental Option (BPEO) is the purposed best practice in terms of sustainability. A BPEO is meant to minimize environmental damage in a cost-effective manner, in both the short- and long-term. Production and disposal of wastes are major concerns wherein the Best Practicable Environmental Option are expected to be applied.

== Definition ==
According to the 12th Report of the Royal Commission on Environmental Pollution (RCEP), the BPEO is defined as "the outcome of a systematic and consultative decision- making procedure which emphasizes the protection and conservation of the environment across land, air and water." The BPEO goal, curated by the United Kingdom's RCEP, identifies and evaluates proposed disposal methods using environmental and economic auditing tools that ultimately aim to provide environmentally and economically viable solutions; solutions that may be easily coordinated with the laws, institutions and policies governing the control of pollution.

Philosophically, the BPEO concept is similar to the practice of sustainable development. The rationale behind the BPEO is "polluter-orientated—not policy-, planning-, or environmentally-, directed"—an ideology that is intended to facilitate the comparison of disposal options by associating each practice with its respective environmental impacts. This comparison establishes the opportunity to change current disposal practices and implement less environmentally harmful options. From a criterion standpoint, the BPEO must meet certain standards of practicality for successful implementation in legislative and social aspects—otherwise, the BPEO would only be the best 'environmental' option.

Although the BPEO is determined by the previously defined criteria, the concept emphasizes that the waste hierarchy—reduce, reuse, recycle, recovery and disposal—cannot be applied without taking into consideration the environmental, economic and social impacts associated with the options considered, given that the BPEO must be economically and socially sustainable as well.

== Development ==
=== History ===
Early derivatives of BPEO formed due to the notable concern and focus on environmental auditing—as such, to understand the development of BPEO, it is critical to understand the origins of environmental auditing. Environmental auditing was originally developed as a business management tool to address concerns about compliance with legislation and regulations. Further, "environmental auditing provides environmental performance[s]" and has the capability to identify "any negative environmental impacts" and evaluate "the opportunities to change current practices in order to improve that performance." For that reason, environmental auditing tools are necessary for the establishment of the BPEO. However, environmental auditing was highly regarded long before the creation of the BPEO—in fact, this auditing mechanism played a primary role in the establishment of BPEO's predecessor, BPM, or "best practicable means." Additionally, "BATNEEC", also known as "BAT", or the "best available technology not entailing excessive cost" is a concept closely associated with BPEO—and, unsurprisingly, derives from the early BPM construct. The ideology behind the BPEO is based largely on the basis of its early counterparts, but is intended to harmoniously merge the primary concerns behind BPM, BAT, and other like-minded concepts—environmental, economic, and social concerns.

=== Reason for Establishment ===
The concept of the BPEO was introduced by the RCEP due its identification of the "need for a more unified approach to regulatory control over pollutant discharges than that which prevailed at the time." Prior to the development of the BPEO, "separate and effectively independent controls over the disposals of waste to air, water and land" had been in effect; the UK, however, desired a more uniform approach to waste management. Further, the RCEP sought to identify the "optimum overall environmental solution for any given waste stream"—and so the BPEO came to be, with the intention to direct pollution "to the medium where the least damage would be done." At the time of creation, a primary reason for the development of the BPEO was to develop a "systematic audit trail" that would allow for transparent decision making. This audit trail involved the development of the BPEO's seven key stages: (1) "define the objective," (2) "generate options," (3) "evaluate the options," (4) "summarise and present the evaluation," (5) "select the BPEO," (6) "review the BPEO," and (7) "implement and monitor." The development of these stages was a notable event in the early history of the BPEO concept, as this procedural development extended the idea beyond its early focus, pollution control, and prompted the expansion of the scope to include "all projects affecting the environment"—while simultaneously expanding the reasoning behind the establishment of the BPEO concept to include the need for broader considerations of environmental factors, as well as the demand for the establishment of more cost-effective and socially feasible waste management options.

In the simplest of terms, the BPEO idea was established as an attempt to institute a method that could determine the soundest waste disposal practices using a holistic approach. With respect to the reasoning for the development of the BPEO, it is critically important to note that the UK's RCEP recognized the demand for a structured concept, rather than a rigid decision making tool—and, therefore, put forth the BPEO process as a "framework concept, linked to an underlying systematic process" as opposed to a precise, regulated tool. A notable appeal of the BPEO concept resides within the fundamentals of the approach—as it is one that is holistic in nature and allows for the identification of a "preferred overall strategy" in which the environment is considered wholly, rather than piece by piece, and does not demand strict optimization of the processes. For example, the flexibility of this framework concept is exemplified by the fact that two distinct locations may have different BPEO's for the same type of waste.

Stakeholder involvement—or the participation of "anyone with an active interest in waste management"—is possibility the most obvious, publicly understood driving factor behind the establishment and identification of the BPEO. The involvement and encouragement of those individuals interested in practical, environmentally sound waste management processes is said to have made a significant impact on the RCEP's decision to curate the BPEO.

== Implementation ==
The BPEO is determined by identifying and analyzing factors for the management of the waste in question. Key variables include the environmental impact, cost, compliance and technical viability arising from the different types of waste management methods identified. Since the BPEO may be different for the same type of waste originating from differing locations, the RCEP developed a simple four-step universal procedure, shown as follows, that allows for the determination of the BPEO, relative to the area in the scope of the assessment: "(1) Researching current waste types, amounts and waste disposal routes, (2) Analyzing potential waste management routes, (3) Identifying, and where possible quantifying, impacts relating to cost, legislation, global and local environment, [and] (4) Providing the tools and guidance to help waste producers to identify their BPEO."

Of primary importance to the determination and implementation of the BPEO are the potential environmental impacts, increased cost-effectiveness, and social feasibility. In determining the BPEO, identifying and analyzing waste management options is a critical part of the process. Additionally, given the framework nature of the BPEO concept, the flexibility afforded allows for a BPEO determination that is unique to the type of waste, location, and any other relevant data points—and allows for the specifics of the analysis to incorporate as many strategic tools or analysis methods as desired.

For example, the Montrose Port Authority (MPA), in its "Maintenance Dredging BPEO" report, used the Waste Hierarchy Assessment (WHA) to determine the BPEO. After considering multiple options, it was determined that the current method of disposal—identified during a previous BPEO analysis—has remained the BPEO. Specifically, for the MPA, the decision to have the current disposal method remain at a licensed disposal ground was determined after identifying and analyzing a wealth of environmental, economic, social factors that led to the following conclusion—altering the disposal method, specifically to a means of land-based disposal in a terrestrial landfill, would be cost-prohibitive, impractical, and not environmentally sustainable. In this particular instance, the current BPEO at the time of review was determined to remain the BPEO, as all other options considered were determined to be less viable options. The Maintenance Dredging BPEO determination by the Montrose Port Authority serves as a prominent example of the importance of determining the BPEO using the herein described process—as the BPEO framework allows for the determination of the best, most practicable, environmentally conscious, cost effective waste management option possible.

== Critique ==
The ideology behind the BPEO expresses concern for social improvements—in addition to the focus on economic viability, a reduction in overall resource consumption, and its associated environmental impacts—though, in reality, the methodology and practical resources used to determine the BPEO, by way of Life Cycle Assessment (LCA) and economic auditing tools, rely on strategic tools with little regard for the determining or monitoring of the practicality of social impacts. In fact, doctoral candidates from the Open University conducted a BPEO review that reinforces the aforementioned thinking—their findings support "the idea that LCA would allow a systematic examination of a waste management option and its environmental impacts both up-stream and down-stream of the waste disposal unit" though "there is little, if any, literature that considers the combination of LCA with financial and social modelling techniques" in determining the BPEO. These scholars go on to highlight the importance of considering the "international obligations, the national policy framework, and policy guidance at a local level" to effectively determine the BPEO—noting the fact that "none of these [social] factors can be considered by a financial model or LCA alone."

== See also ==
- Best Available Technology
- Conservation movement
- Environmental protection
