= Cannikin =

1971 underground nuclear weapons test on Amchitka island, Alaska, United States

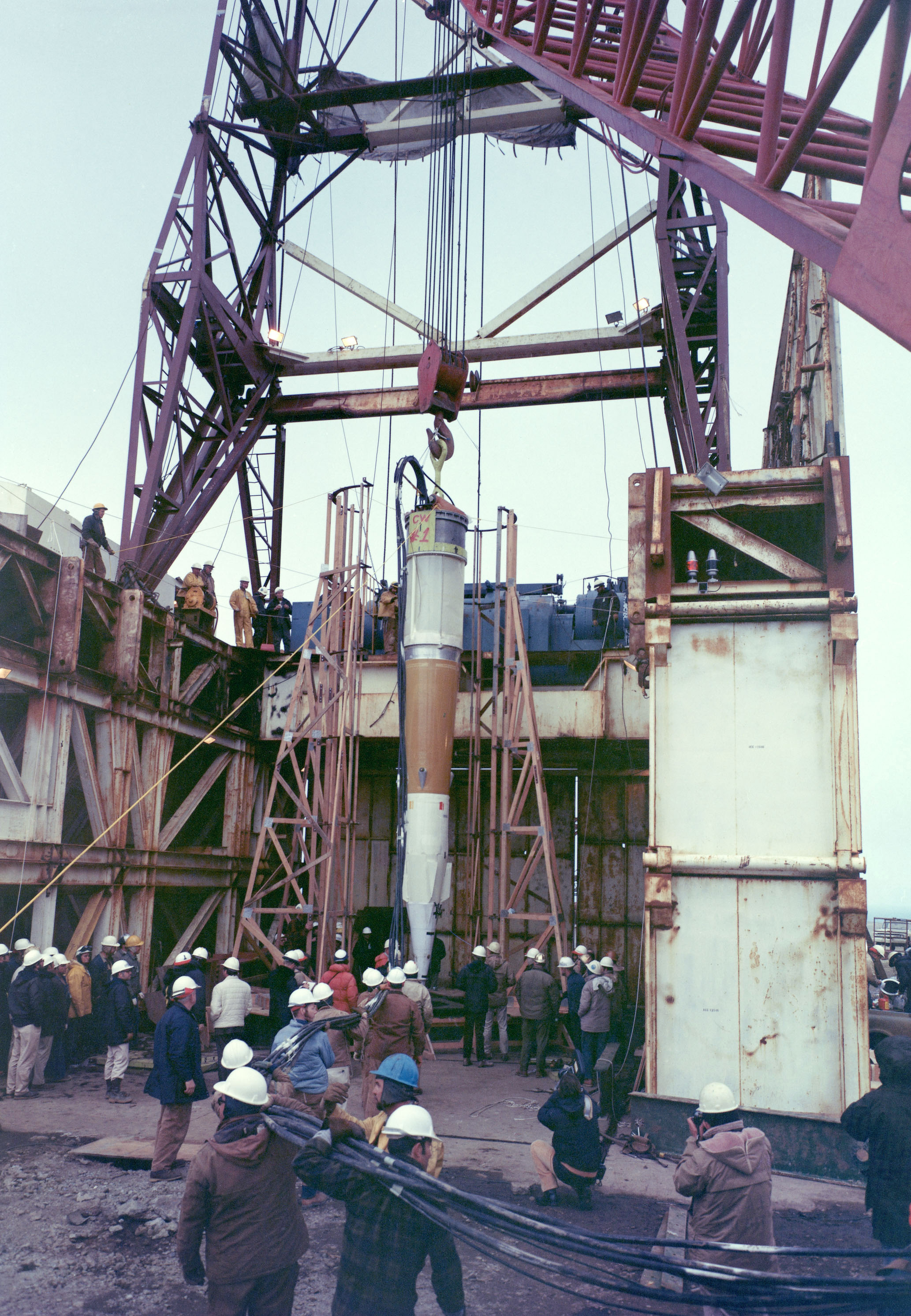
A complete Spartan interceptor and warhead lowered into the shot hole.

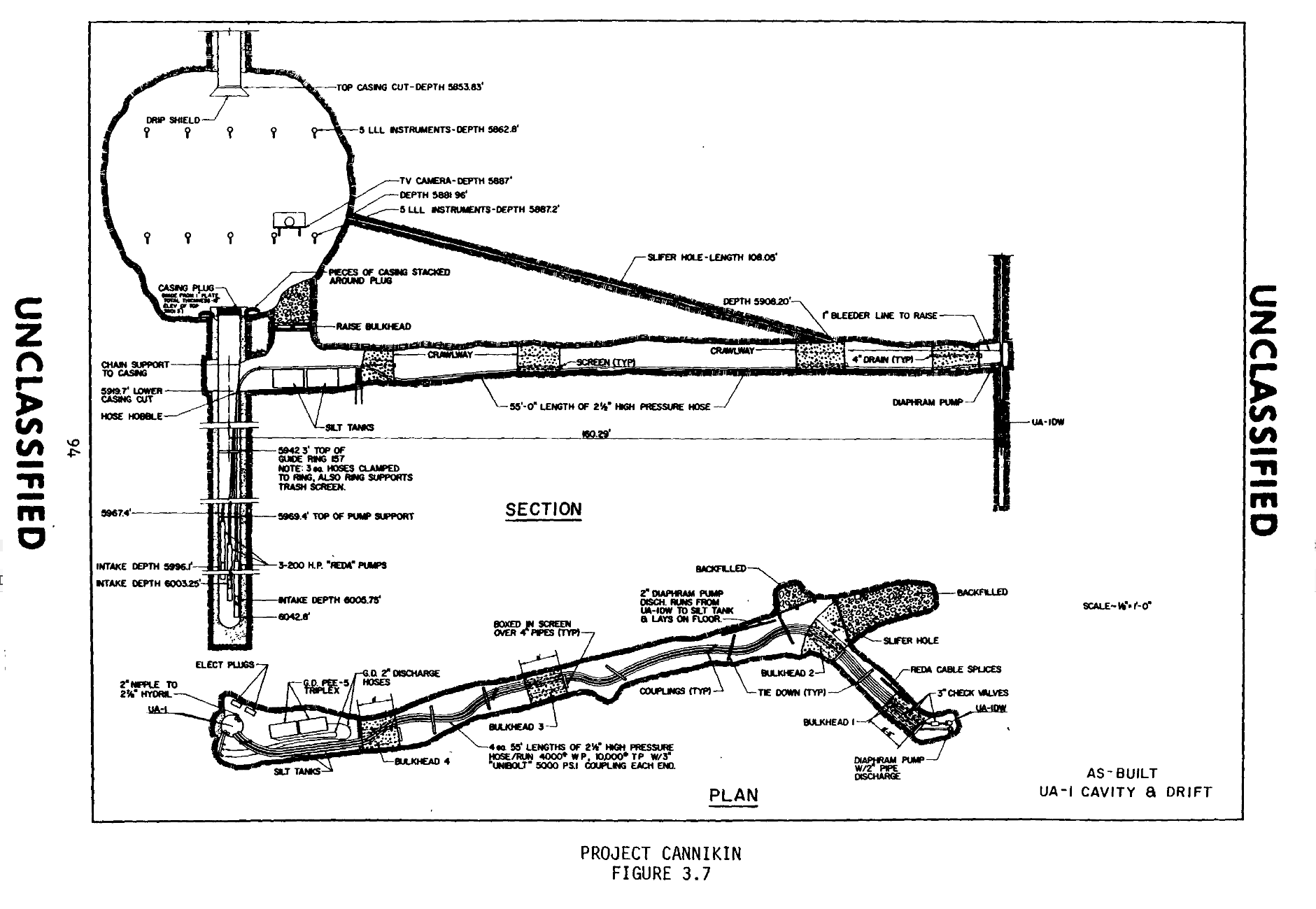
Cannikin shot cavity

Cannikin was an underground nuclear weapons test performed on November 6, 1971, on Amchitka island, Alaska, by the United States Atomic Energy Commission. The experiment, part of the Operation Grommet nuclear test series, tested the unique W71 warhead design for the LIM-49 Spartan anti-ballistic missile. With an explosive yield of almost 5 megatons of TNT (21 PJ), the test was the largest underground explosion ever detonated by the United States.

Prior to the main five-megaton test in 1971, a 1 Mt (4.2 PJ) test took place on the island on October 2, 1969, for calibration purposes, and to ensure the subsequent Cannikin test could be contained. This test, Milrow, was included in the Operation Mandrel nuclear test series.

The Cannikin test faced considerable opposition on environmental grounds. The campaigning environmental organization Greenpeace grew out of efforts to oppose the test.

== Siting ==
The Cannikin test was too large to be conducted safely at Nevada Test Site. Amchitka had been considered in the 1950s as a potential nuclear test site, but had been deemed unsuitable at that time. In 1965, a single nuclear test, Long Shot, was carried out on the island for the purposes of seismic detection development, under program Vela Uniform. The Amchitka site was again investigated as an atmospheric nuclear test site for intercontinental ballistic missile silo design under Project Rufus in the 1960s, but the atmospheric testing component was abandoned following the establishment of the Partial Nuclear Test Ban Treaty.

== Preparation ==
Project Cannikin review

Preparation for the test took place over five years and involved hundreds of staff from the Lawrence Radiation Laboratory, later the Lawrence Livermore National Laboratory. Drilling for the shaft for the Milrow test began in March 1967, with drilling for the Cannikin test commencing in August 1967.

To perform the test, 400 tons of equipment was placed in a shaft 1,870 metres (6,150 ft) deep and 2.3 metres (90 in) wide. Test support equipment was designed to survive a ground upheaval of 4.6 metres (15 ft) at test time.

The chairman of the Atomic Energy Commission, James R. Schlesinger, brought his wife and two daughters to Amchitka for the test to emphasize the safety of the test.

== Opposition ==
Both the 1969 calibration test and Cannikin itself attracted protest. Because of the 1964 Alaska earthquake, the plans raised concerns that tests might trigger earthquakes and cause a tsunami. A 1969 demonstration of 7,000 people blocked a major U.S.–Canada border crossing in British Columbia, carrying signs reading "Don't Make A Wave. It's Your Fault If Our Fault Goes". Further demonstrations occurred at Canada–US border crossings in Ontario and Quebec. The Canadian Don't Make a Wave Committee, founded that year in Vancouver, attempted to halt further nuclear testing on the Aleutian Islands chain. With the intention of sailing to Amchitka to protest the 1971 test, the committee chartered a ship it renamed Greenpeace. During the voyage to Amchitka, the test was delayed a month. The ship was turned back by the U.S. Coast Guard, although a letter given to the Greenpeace crew showed support for the protest by some on the intervening Coast Guard ship. Under their own ship's name, the organization created for the protest continued to exist as the campaigning environmental organization Greenpeace.

In July 1971, the anti-nuclear Committee for Nuclear Responsibility filed suit against the Atomic Energy Commission, asking the court to stop the test. The suit was unsuccessful, with the Supreme Court denying the injunction by 4 votes to 3. The test was carried out but, although it triggered small earthquakes, did not cause a tsunami as feared.

== Test results ==
Cannikin explosion, 4.8Mt

Cannikin was detonated on November 6, 1971 ^{51°28′13.20″N 179°6′40.75″E}, as the thirteenth test of the Operation Grommet (1971–1972) underground nuclear test series. The announced yield was 5 megatons (21 PJ) – the largest underground nuclear test in U.S. history. (Estimates for the precise yield range from 4.4 to 5.2 megatons or 18 to 22 PJ). The ground lifted 20 feet (6 m), caused by an explosive force almost 400 times the power of the Hiroshima bomb. Subsidence and faulting at the site created a new lake, several hundred meters wide. The explosion caused a seismic shock of 7.0 on the Richter scale, causing rockfalls and turf slides of a total of 35,000 square feet (3,300 m^{2}). Though earthquakes and tsunamis predicted by environmentalists did not occur, a number of small tectonic events did occur in the following weeks, (some registering as high as 4.0 on the Richter scale) thought to be due to the interaction of the explosion with local tectonic stresses.

== See also ==
- Military history of the Aleutian Islands
