= Landing at Amchitka =

1943 US landing in Alaska during WWII

- Part of the Aleutian Islands campaign
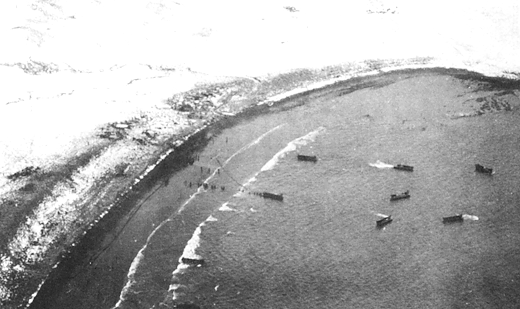
- The American landing at Constantine Harbor, 12 January
Date	12 January 1943
Location	Amchitka, Territory of Alaska, United States
Result	American victory: Successful landing; seizure of Amchitka

Belligerents
United States	(Empire of Japan) Japan (not present)

Commanders and leaders
(United States) Lloyd E. Jones	N/A

Strength
2,100	N/A

Casualties and losses
14 killed 1 destroyer sunk	N/A

The landing at Amchitka on 12 January 1943 was the unopposed amphibious landing operation and occupation of Amchitka island by American forces during the Aleutian Islands campaign during World War II.

== Background ==
In June 1942, the Japanese occupied the western Aleutian Islands of Attu and Kiska, and they hoped to occupy Amchitka. A Japanese survey team scouted the island but rejected it for military purposes.

American military planners determined that an airbase was needed near the Japanese-occupied islands. Amchitka was ruled out as a possible candidate since it was only 50 miles away from Kiska. At the War Department's suggestion, an initial reconnaissance of Amchitka was carried out in September 1942, which found that it would be difficult to build an airstrip on the island. Nevertheless, planners decided in December that the airfield "had to be built" to prevent the Japanese from doing the same.

A reconnaissance mission visited Amchitka from 17 to 19 December and reported that a fighter strip could be built in two to three weeks, and a main airfield in three to four months. Plans were drawn out for the landings dubbed "Operation Longview". The operation would scrape together 2,000 immediate U.S military in the Aleutian Islands by the Alaska Defense Command. It was thought through reconnaissance that Amchitka was occupied by a small Japanese military presence. Eager to remove the Japanese, the Joint Chiefs of Staff agreed to move quickly to regain the territory.

== Landing at Constantine Harbor ==
The operation was set for 9 January 1943 but was delayed by weather. American forces made an unopposed landing at Constantine Harbor near the southwest end of the island on 12 January. Nearly 2,100 troops disembarked without opposition. Their only enemies were the weather, the unpredictable current, and the rock-studded waters through which the landing was made.

The destroyer USS Worden was guarding the transport USS Arthur Middleton as she put the preliminary Army security unit on the shore. The destroyer maneuvered into the rock-edged harbor and stayed there until the last men had landed and then turned to the business of clearing the harbor. A strong current, however, swept Worden onto a pinnacle that tore into a hull beneath the engine room and caused a complete loss of power. The destroyer then broached and began breaking up in the surf. Commander William G. Pogue, the destroyer's commanding officer, ordered abandon ship, and as he was directing that effort, he was swept overboard into the wintry seas by a heavy wave that broke over the ship. Pogue was among the fortunate ones, however, because he was hauled, unconscious, out of the sea. Fourteen of the crew drowned.

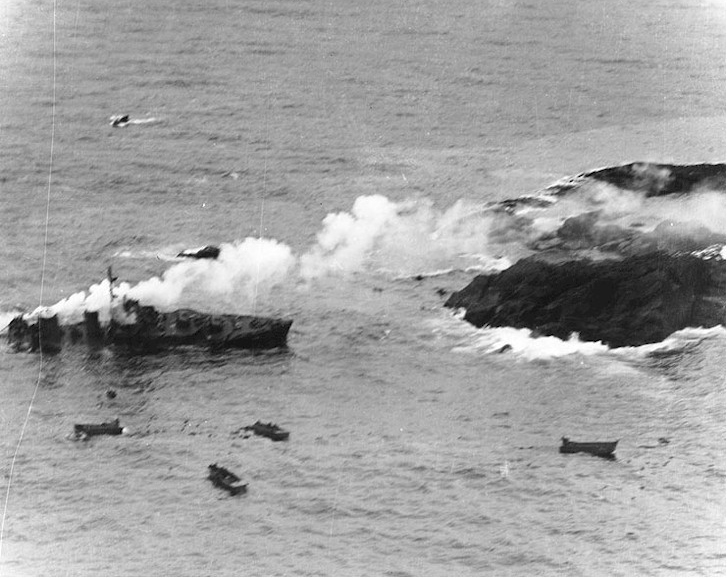
USS Worden being abandoned shortly after a hull breach beneath the engine room

Once on the ground the island was cleared and found to be empty of Japanese military. During the first night ashore a "willowaw" (violent squall) smashed many of the landing boats and swept a troop transport aground. On the second day a blizzard wracked the island with snow, sleet, and biting wind. Lasting for nearly two weeks, the blizzard finally subsided enough to reveal to a Japanese scout plane from Kiska the American beachhead on Amchitka. Harassed by bombing and strafing attacks from Kiska, engineers continued work on an airfield on Amchitka, completing it in mid-February. Japanese attacks on the island then sharply declined. By 16 February the fighter strip was ready for limited operation. On that day, eight Curtis P-40 Warhawks arrived on Amchitka, and within a week they were running patrols over Kiska.

The stage was now set for the next phase of operations, amphibious attacks to eject the Japanese from their Aleutian footholds.

== See also ==
- Battle of Attu
- Military history of the Aleutian Islands
- Operation Cottage
