= W71 =

American thermonuclear weapon

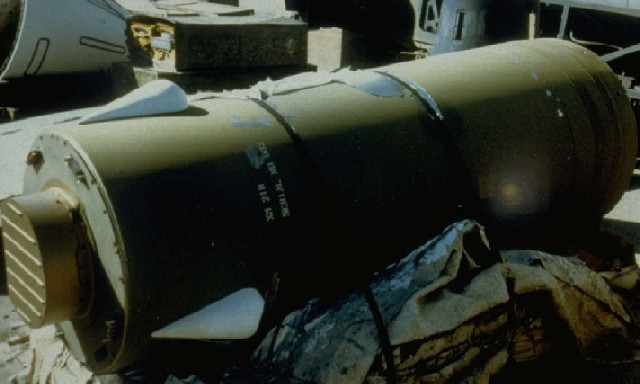
The W71 nuclear warhead

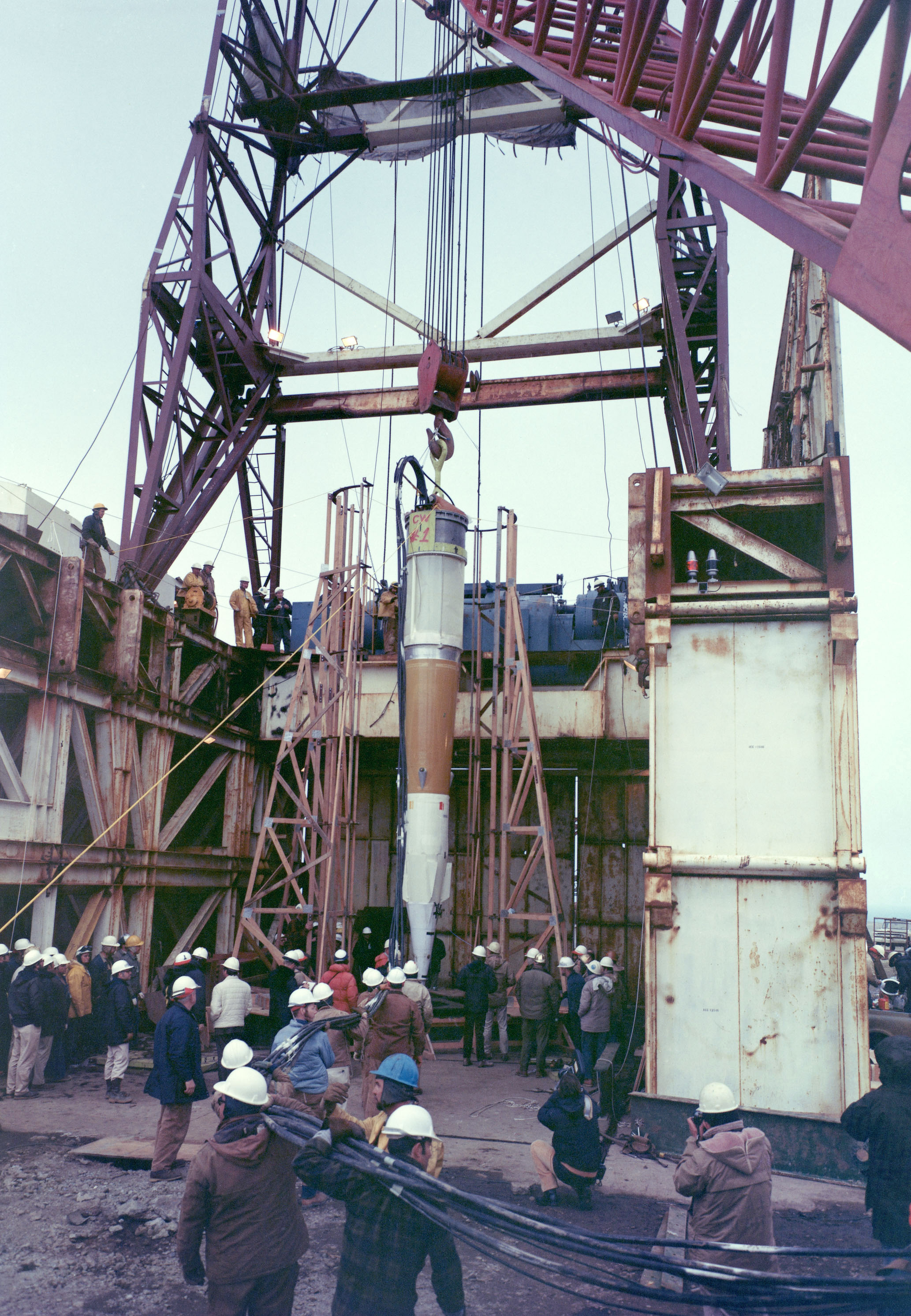
W71 warhead and Spartan missile upper stage being lowered into the borehole for the nuclear test Grommet Cannikin.

The W71 nuclear warhead was a US thermonuclear warhead developed at Lawrence Livermore National Laboratory in California and deployed on the LIM-49A Spartan missile, a component of the Safeguard Program, an anti-ballistic missile (ABM) defense system briefly deployed by the US in the 1970s.

The W71 warhead was designed to intercept incoming enemy warheads at long range, as far as 450 miles (720 km) from the launch point. The interception took place at such high altitudes, comparable to low Earth orbit, where there is practically no air. At these altitudes, x-rays resulting from the nuclear explosion can destroy incoming reentry vehicles at distances on the order of 10 miles (16 km), which made the problem of guiding the missile to the required accuracies much simpler than earlier designs that had lethal ranges of less than 1,000 feet (300 m).

The W71 warhead had a yield of around 5 megatons of TNT (21 PJ). The warhead package was roughly a cylinder, 42 inches (1.1 m) in diameter and 101 inches (2.6 m) long. The complete warhead weighed around 2,850 pounds (1,290 kg).

The W71 produced great amounts of x-rays, requiring very substantial innovations in the secondary, thermonuclear, stage, and needed to minimize fission output and debris to reduce the radar blackout effect that fission products and debris produce on anti-ballistic missile radar systems.

== Design ==
The W71 design emerged in the mid-1960s as the result of studies of earlier high-altitude nuclear tests carried out before the Partial Nuclear Test Ban Treaty of 1963. A number of tests, especially those of Operation Fishbowl in 1962, demonstrated a number of previously poorly understood or underestimated effects. Among these was the behaviour of x-rays created during the explosion. These tended to react with the atmosphere within a few tens of meters at low altitudes (see rope trick effect). At high altitudes, lacking an atmosphere to interact with, the mean free path of the x-rays could be on the order of tens of kilometers.

This presented a new method of attacking enemy nuclear reentry vehicles (RVs) while still at long range from their targets. X-rays hitting the warhead's outermost layer will react by heating a thin layer of the material so rapidly that shock waves develop that can cause the heat shield material on the outside of the RV to separate or flake off. The RV would then break up during reentry. The major advantage of this attack is that it takes place over long distances, as great as 30 kilometres (19 mi), which covers the majority of the threat tube containing the warhead and the various radar decoys and clutter material that accompanies it. Previously the ABM had to approach within less than 800 feet (240 m) of the warhead to damage it through neutron heating, which presented a serious problem attempting to locate the warhead within a threat tube that was typically at least a kilometer across and about ten long.

Bell received a contract to begin conversion of the earlier LIM-49 Nike Zeus missile for the extended range role in March 1965. The result was the Zeus EX, or DM-15X2, which used the original Zeus' first stage as the second stage along with a new first stage to offer much greater range. The design was renamed Spartan in January 1967, keeping the original LIM-49 designation. Tests of the new missile started in April 1970 from Meck Island, part of the Kwajalein Test Range that had been set up to test the earlier Nike Zeus system. Because of a perceived need to rapidly deploy the system, the team took a "do it once, do it right" approach in which the original test items were designed to be the production models.

The warhead for Spartan was designed by Lawrence Livermore National Laboratory (LLNL), drawing on previous experience from Operation Plowshare. A nuclear explosion at high altitude has the disadvantage of creating a significant amount of electronic noise and an effect known as nuclear blackout that blinds radars over a large area. Some of these effects are due to the fission fragments being released by the explosion, so care was taken to design the bomb to be "clean" to reduce these effects. Project Plowshares had previously explored the design of such clean bombs as part of an effort to use nuclear explosives for civilian uses where the production of long-lived radionuclides had to be minimized.

To maximize the production of x-rays, the W71 is reported to have used a gold tamper, rather than the usual depleted uranium or lead. The lining normally serves the primary purpose of capturing x-ray energy within the bomb casing while the primary is exploding and triggering the secondary. For this purpose, almost any high-Z metal will work, and depleted uranium is often used because the neutrons released by the secondary will cause fission in this material and add a significant amount of energy to the total explosive release. In this case the increase in blast energy would have no effect as there is little or no atmosphere to carry that energy, so this reaction is of little value. The use of gold may have been to tailor its transparency to x-rays. In Congressional testimony on potential dismantling of the W71, a DOE official described the warhead as "a gold mine".

In 2008, the United States Department of Energy declassified the fact that the radiation case of the W71 contained thorium metal.

== Lethality ==
Under good conditions, the W71 warhead had a lethal exo-atmospheric radius as much as 30 miles (48 km), although it was later stated to be 12 miles (19 km) against "soft" targets, and as little as 4 miles (6.4 km) against hardened warheads.

== Production & service history ==
There were 30 to 39 units produced between 1974 and 1975. The weapons went into service in 1975, but were retired that same year, and the warheads stored until 1992 when they were dismantled. The short service life of the W71, Spartan and Safeguard Program in general, is believed to have been partly tied to it largely becoming obsolete with the development of Soviet offensive MIRV (Multiple independent re-entry vehicles) warheads, that unlike MRVs (multiple re-entry vehicles), can create a substantial spacing distance between each warhead once they arrive in space, hence would require at least approximately one Spartan missile launch to intercept each MIRV warhead. As the cost of the Spartan and an enemy ICBM were roughly the same, an adversary could afford to overwhelm the ABM system by adding ICBMs with MIRV warheads to its nuclear arsenal.

== Shot Grommet Cannikin ==
Prior to the W71 test, a calibration test known as Milrow of Operation Mandrel was conducted in 1969. Despite political and pressure group opposition to both tests, and in particular the full yield W71, coming from then US Senator Mike Gravel and the nascent Greenpeace, a Supreme Court decision led to the test shot getting the go-ahead, and a W71 prototype was successfully tested on 6 November 1971 in Project Cannikin of Operation Grommet in the world's largest underground nuclear test, on Amchitka Island in the Aleutian Islands off Alaska. The second highest-yield underground test known occurred in 1973, when the USSR tested a 4 Mt device 392

The W71 was lowered 6,150 feet (1,870 m) down a 90-inch-diameter (2.3 m) borehole into a man-made cavern 52 feet (16 m) in diameter. A 264-foot-long (80 m) instrumentation system monitored the detonation. The full yield test was conducted at 11:00 am local time November 6, 1971 and resulted in a vertical ground motion of more than 15 feet (4.6 m) at a distance of 2,000 feet (610 m) from the borehole, equivalent to an earthquake of magnitude 7.0 on the Richter scale. A 1-mile-wide (1.6 km) and 40-foot-deep (12 m) crater formed two days later.

== See also ==
- Amchitka Milrow and Cannikin tests
