= Lloyd E. Jones =

United States Army general (1889–1958)

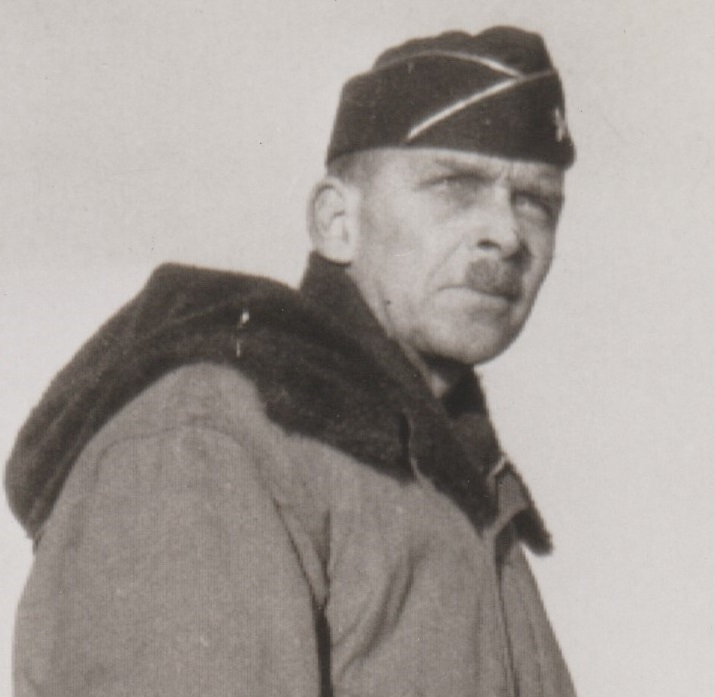
- Jones observes troops come ashore on Amchitka Island, May 7, 1943.
- Born: June 17, 1889; Columbia, Missouri, US
- Died: January 3, 1958 (aged 68); Columbia, South Carolina, US
- Burial place: Arlington National Cemetery
- Relatives: John Carleton Jones (father)
- Military career
- Allegiance: United States
- Branch: United States Army
- Service years: 1911–1946
- Rank: Major General
- Service number: 0-3161
- Commands: 10th Mountain Division; Amchitka Task Force, Alaska Defense Command; 76th Field Artillery Brigade; 1st Battalion, 83rd Field Artillery Regiment; 5th Field Artillery Brigade, 5th Division
- Conflicts: World War I World War II
- Awards: Army Distinguished Service Medal

Lloyd E. Jones (June 17, 1889 – January 3, 1958) was a United States Army major general. A veteran of World War I, he was prominent during World War II as commander of the Alaska Defense Command's Amchitka Task Force and the 10th Mountain Division.

The son of the president of the University of Missouri, Jones attended the university while teaching school and serving in the Missouri National Guard. He served in the Philippines after receiving his Army commission in 1912. During World War I he was an instructor at two officers’ training camps, organized and temporarily commanded an Artillery brigade, and completed an advanced field artillery course in France. After World War I, Jones graduated from the Command and General Staff College and the Army War College, and served in a variety of command and staff assignments, including professor of military science for the University of Missouri's Reserve Officers' Training Corps program.

During World War II, Jones was promoted to brigadier general and commanded an Artillery brigade before serving in the Aleutian Islands campaign as commander of the defense of Amchitka. From July 1943 to November 1944 he commanded the 10th Mountain Division during its initial organization, training, and preparation for combat. During this command he was promoted to major general. After relinquishing command to George Price Hays, Jones served at the Army War College and Headquarters, Army Ground Forces until retiring in 1946.

In retirement, Jones was a resident of Columbia, South Carolina. He died there on January 3, 1958, and was buried at Arlington National Cemetery.

== Early life ==
Lloyd Edmonstone Jones was born in Columbia, Missouri on June 17, 1889. He was the son of Dr. John Carleton Jones (1856–1930), an educator who served as president of the University of Missouri, and Clara Field Thompson Jones (d. July 19, 1936).

Jones attended the University of Missouri while teaching school, and received a commission as a second lieutenant in Company G, 4th Regiment of the Missouri National Guard.

He left college in his junior year after passing the examination for a commission in the Army. He placed fifth of the 225 applicants who took the exam, and his high standing allowed him to choose his branch. He selected Field Artillery, and was appointed a second lieutenant in the 6th Field Artillery Regiment in December 1911.

He completed the Field Artillery Officer Course at Fort Leavenworth in 1912, and joined the 5th Field Artillery Regiment at Fort Sill, where he remained until being posted to the Philippines with the 2nd Field Artillery in 1915.

== World War I ==
By the time of the American entry into World War I, Jones was a captain and served as an instructor at Officers Training Camps at the Presidio of San Francisco and in Leon Springs, Texas. He then served on the general staff at the War Department.

In 1918, Jones was promoted to temporary lieutenant colonel and commanded the 5th Field Artillery Brigade, part of the 5th Division. He later served as a senior instructor for the 2nd Field Artillery Brigade at the Camp Jackson, South Carolina Artillery Replacement Training Center. Jones graduated from the Army Center of Artillery Studies in France, and returned to the United States in July 1919.

== Post-World War I ==
After the war, Jones reverted to the permanent rank of captain. He was subsequently promoted to major, and his assignments included Professor of Military Science at the University of Missouri. He was also commander of the Field Artillery branch competitive pistol team, which took part in matches against Harvard University, West Point, the University of Oklahoma, and other schools.

In 1922, Jones authored a manual on field artillery techniques and procedures, Field Artillery Applied Mathematics. He later commanded 1st Battalion, 83rd Field Artillery Regiment. Jones was a 1924 graduate of the Army Command and General Staff College, and a 1930 graduate of the Army War College.

Jones served in the plans, operations, and training directorate (G3) on the War Department General Staff from 1930 to 1934. He was promoted to lieutenant colonel on August 1, 1935, and served on the staff and faculty of the Field Artillery School at Fort Sill from 1935 to 1938. From 1939 to 1940 he served at the University of Montana as Professor of Military Science and Tactics.

== World War II ==
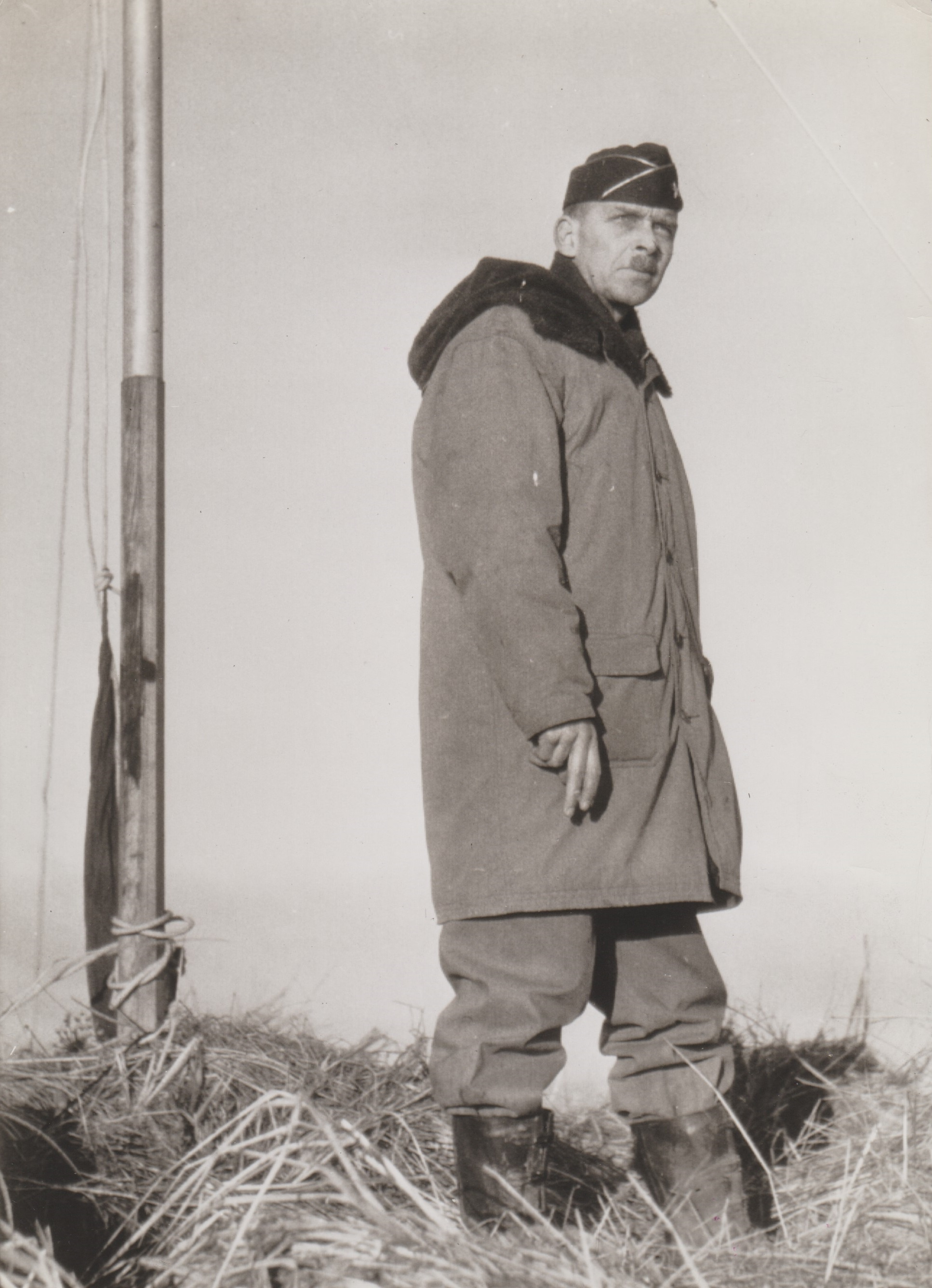
Jones observes US troops come ashore on Amchitka Island, Alaska.

In the early years of World War II, Jones, promoted to colonel on September 1, 1940, and he was head of the R.O.T.C. programs in the Army's Seventh Corps Area. In 1940 he was assigned as chief of staff for I Corps.

Jones was promoted to the temporary rank of brigadier general on July 10, 1941, and assigned as commander of the 76th Field Artillery Brigade at Fort Warren, Wyoming.

In 1943 he was commander of an Alaska Defense Command task force during the Landing at Amchitka and subsequent defense of the island as the United States retook the Aleutians from the Japanese, for which he received the Army Distinguished Service Medal.

From July 1943 to November 1944, Jones, promoted to the temporary rank of major general on September 15, 1943, was commander of the 10th Infantry Division. He was the division's first commander, and oversaw its initial organization and training in winter and high altitude operations at Camp Hale, Colorado prior to its departure for combat in Europe.

When Jones fell ill with bronchitis, he was replaced as division commander by Brigadier General George P. Hays. For the rest of the war, Jones performed duty at the Army War College and at Headquarters, Army Ground Forces. He retired for disability on April 30, 1946.

== Death and burial ==
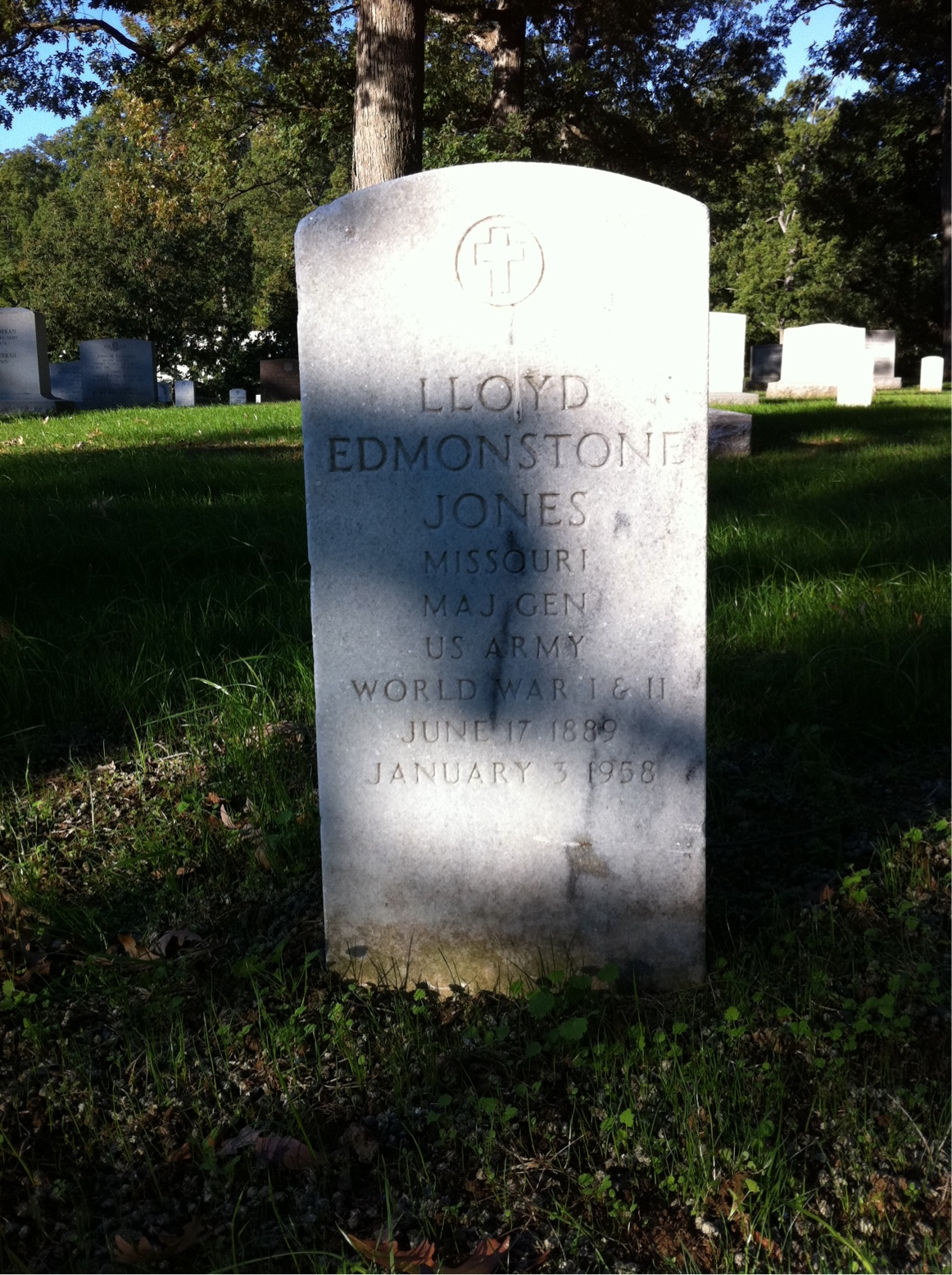
Jones' gravestone at Arlington National Cemetery

Jones died in Columbia, South Carolina on January 3, 1958. He was buried at Arlington National Cemetery, Section 30, Site 726.

== Family ==
In 1919, Jones married Elizabeth Heriot Rembert (1900–1978). They were the parents of three children: John Carleton (a World War II veteran and Baltimore Sun reporter); Lloyd E. Jr. (a career Army officer); and daughter Anne.

== Legacy ==
In 1964 the newly constructed Army Reserve Center in Columbia, Missouri was named for him.

In March 2013, the 10th Mountain Division's Range Operations Center at Fort Drum was named for him.

== Sources ==
=== Internet ===
- Rasmussen, Frederick N. (January 5, 2008). "Carleton Jones, Age 84: Former Sunday Sun reporter, author and critic was known for stylish writing and love of Maryland history". Baltimore Sun. Baltimore, MD. Archived from the original on November 18, 2016.
- "South Carolina, Death Records 1821–1961, entry for Lloyd E. Jones". Ancestry.com. Provo, UT: Ancestry.com LLC.
- U.S. Department of the Army. "Burial Record: Jones, Lloyd E". ANC Explorer. Arlington, VA: Arlington National Cemetery.
- Ayyad, Osama (March 19, 2015). "Fort Drum officials honor division's first commander". Army.mil. Washington, DC: US Army.

=== Newspapers ===
- "Asked to Accompany Troops: Lieutenant Lloyd Jones will not go to Texas Maneuvers, However". The Evening Missourian. Columbia, MO. March 10, 1911. p. 1.
- "L. E. Jones in U.S. Army: Successful Examination by Son of University Dean". The Evening Missourian. Columbia, MO. December 1, 1911. p. 1.
- "Lloyd Jones into the Service". The Evening Missourian. Columbia, MO. January 25, 1912. p. 1.
- "Lloyd E. Jones to Philippines". The Evening Missourian. Columbia, MO. September 3, 1915. p. 1.
- "Army Officer Visits Parents: Lieutenant L. E. Jones to Leave for Post in Philippines October 5". The Evening Missourian. Columbia, MO. September 24, 1915. p. 3.
- Shanedling, Joshua (October 16, 1917). "Dugout Digging Promotes Orgy of Camp Grief". San Francisco Chronicle. San Francisco, CA. p. 6.
- "Col. Jones to Washington". The Evening Missourian. Columbia, MO. November 16, 1918. p. 4.
- "Col. Lloyd Jones Sails: His Bride, Formerly Miss Rembert, Returns Soon to Columbia". The State. Columbia, SC. May 25, 1919. p. 14.
- "An Artillery Unit at M. U." Kansas City Star. Kansas City, MO. August 13, 1919. p. 2 MO.
- "Captain L. E. Jones Promoted". The Evening Missourian. Columbia, MO. November 1, 1920. p. 1.
- "Pistol Team to Compete". The Evening Missourian. Columbia, MO. March 28, 1921. p. 5.
- "Officers of R.O.T.C.: Appointments for 1922–23". The Evening Missourian. Columbia, MO. August 19, 1922. p. 1.
- "Dr. John C. Jones, Retired Head of Missouri U., Dies". The Post-Dispatch. St. Louis, MO. April 22, 1930. p. 10.
- "Widow of Former Head of U. of Missouri Dies". The Post-Dispatch. St. Louis, MO. July 20, 1936. p. 19.
- "Col. Lloyd Jones Transferred". St. Louis Post-Dispatch. St. Louis, MO. Associated Press. October 17, 1940. p. 11.
- "Field Artillery Units at Ft. Warren Being Mobilized". The Independent Record. Helena, MT. Associated Press. December 8, 1941. p. 3.
- "Americans in Amchitka Mud Sweat Out Great Chapter of Ingenuity". Circleville Herald. Circleville, OH. May 12, 1943. p. 1.
- "Heroes of Attu Head New Alpine Force". Salt Lake Tribune. Salt Lake City, UT. International News Service. July 16, 1943. p. 4.
- "Gen. Jones Decorated for Aleutians Heroism". Greeley Daily Tribune. Greeley, CO. Associated Press. August 6, 1943. p. 1.
- "Lloyd E. Jones made Major General". The Tennessean. Nashville, TN. October 3, 1943. p. 49.
- "Maj. Gen. Lloyd E. Jones, 68, Artillery Expert, Dies". Baltimore Sun. Baltimore, MD. Associated Press. January 4, 1958. p. 8.
- "Artillery Expert Dies at 68". News and Tribune. Jefferson City, MO. United Press International. January 5, 1958. p. 17.
- "New Reserve Center Opens". Greenville News. Greenville, SC. Associated Press. June 1, 1964. p. 8.

=== Books ===
- U.S. Secretary of War (1919). Annual Reports of the War Department. Vol. 1. Washington, DC: US Government Printing Office. p. 5187.
- US Army Adjutant General (1929). Army List and Directory. Washington, DC: US Government Printing Office. p. 23.
- US Army Adjutant General (1932). Official U.S. Army Register. Washington, DC: US Government Printing Office. p. 359 – via GenealogyBank.com.
- US Army Adjutant General (1946). Official U.S. Army Register. Washington, DC: US Government Printing Office. p. 364.
- US Army Adjutant General (1947). Official U.S. Army Register. Washington, DC: US Government Printing Office. pp. 1966, 1468 – via Fold3.com.
- Rottman, Gordon L. (2012). US 10th Mountain Division in World War II (PDF). Oxford, UK: Osprey Publishing. p. 24.

Military offices
Preceded by Newly activated organization	Commanding General 10th Mountain Division; 1943–1944	Succeeded by George P. Hays
