= Project Rufus =

Project Rufus was a United States nuclear weapons program aimed at investigation and selection of sites within the United States and its possessions that would be suitable for high-yield atmospheric nuclear testing programs. The project's primary purpose was to identify locations where a Minuteman missile silo could be tested under realistic conditions. The project operated under the umbrella of the Vela Uniform research program.

The project identified numerous sites in the coterminous United States, Pacific Ocean, Alaska and overseas, narrowing the list to ten locations. In late 1963, the process became Project Larkspur, which selected Amchitka Island as the preferred test site for atmospheric testing, using another Vela Uniform project for underground testing, as cover. However, the Partial Nuclear Test Ban Treaty precluded any atmospheric testing, so the Amchitka site was only used for three underground tests. Amchitka was judged suitable for very large tests of over 10 megatons explosive yield. A site in the Brooks Range, judged suitable for tests from 2 to 10 megatons, was considered as a backup, along with Chirikof Island, which was considered suitable for tests up to 2 megatons. All of these yields would have been among the largest American nuclear tests ever.

== Location study ==
On July 8, 1962, the Defense Atomic Support Agency approached the United States Atomic Energy Commission (AEC) to gain the AEC's assistance in studying new locations for high-yield atmospheric nuclear testing programs. In particular, a test site was needed to investigate the behavior of a Minuteman missile silo in nuclear blast conditions. The preferred study area was defined as being within the United States or its possessions, with a 100-mile (160 km) downwind fallout corridor, no cities larger than 10,000 in population within 150 miles (240 km) on an east-west line, low population density, homogeneous sedimentary bedrock, and unlikely to disrupt agriculture, industry, transportation, national defense, fisheries or wildlife, or public works.

Four areas in the Lower 48 were identified:

- The Las Vegas Bombing and Gunnery Range, which included the Nevada Test Site
- Northwest Nevada
- Central Nevada
- Southeastern Utah
- McCone County, Montana
- Southwest Texas

The Texas site was the first to be eliminated, based on its proximity to Mexico, and the other five were included in the next phase of study.

In Alaska, fourteen areas were initially considered, then narrowed to four:

- The northern foothills of the Brooks Range
- The upper Holitna River, lower Kuskokwim River and Koyukuk River areas
- Chirikof Island
- The Aleutian Islands

A number of large American possessions in the Pacific Ocean were considered:

- The Caroline Islands
- The Mariana Islands
- American Samoa
- The Hawaiian Islands

as well as Japanese possessions:

- The Bonin Islands
- The Volcano Islands
- The Daito Islands

Only Pagan in the Mariana Islands was considered in the second phase.

Foreign locations were briefly considered as well, with locations in Ontario and Alberta in Canada, Baja California, the Cayman Islands, the Turks and Caicos Islands, other foreign Pacific islands, Australia, and Kerguelen Island. All of these were rejected, leaving ten possible sites.

By 1963, the list was narrowed to the Nevada Test Site and central Nevada within the coterminous United States. In order of preference followed Chirikof Island, the Brooks Range, the western Aleutians, the Holitna area, and Pagan. Final selection focused on Alaska. The Aleutians and Brooks Range received final scrutiny on the basis of their scant population and limited exposure to other considerations.

Further study identified Amchitka as the only site where a test of 10 megaton or greater yield could be safely conducted. The Brooks Range site was considered suitable for tests of 2 to 10 megatons. Chirikof Island was considered suitable for tests up to 2 megatons.

== Project Larkspur ==
Following the identification of the Brooks Range and Aleutians as final candidates, Chirikof Island was again considered. The final site selection program was called Project Larkspur. The general Aleutian location was refined to Amchitka Island, which had been proposed for nuclear testing in the 1950s under Operation Windstorm, and which was being investigated for an underground test intended to develop seismic identification methodologies, providing a cover for other investigations. Amchitka was therefore chosen as the preferred Larkspur location. The Vela Uniform test became Project Long Shot. As final selection was made, the Partial Nuclear Test Ban Treaty was signed on August 5, 1963, banning atmospheric, underwater, and space-based testing, or testing outside the national boundaries of the state performing the test.

The Amchitka site became the test location for three underground nuclear detonations: Long Shot, Milrow and Cannikin.
