= Military history of the Aleutian Islands =

Aspect of military history surrounding the Aleutian Islands

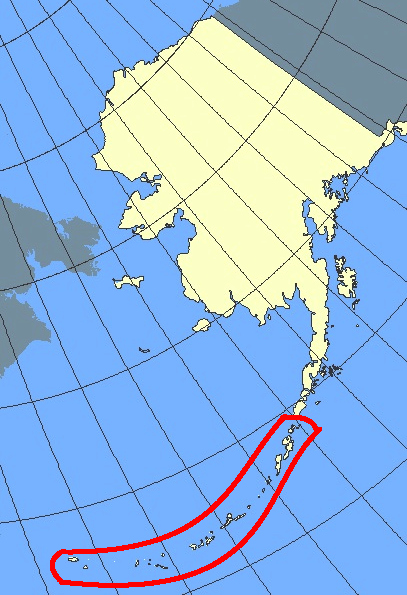
Location of the Aleutian Islands off the coast of Alaska

The military history of the Aleutian Islands began almost immediately following the purchase of Alaska from the Russian Empire by the United States in 1867. Prior to the early 20th century, the Aleutian Islands were essentially ignored by the United States Armed Forces, although the islands played a small role in the Bering Sea Arbitration when a number of British and American vessels were stationed at Unalaska to enforce the arbitrators' decision. By the early 20th century, a number of war strategies examined the possibility of conflict breaking out between the Empire of Japan and the United States. While the Aleutian Islands were seen as a potential staging point for invasions by either side, this possibility was dismissed owing to the islands' dismal climate. In 1922, the Washington Naval Treaty was signed, after which the United States Navy began to take an interest in the islands. However, nothing of significance was to materialize until World War II.

In June 1942, the Imperial Japanese Navy invaded and captured Attu Island and Kiska. This marked the first time in 130 years that United States soil was under occupation by a hostile country and was the only two invasions of the United States during World War II. The Americans wanted to recapture the two islands, and in January the following year began their advance by capturing Amchitka without opposition. On March 26, the Battle of the Komandorski Islands ensued after the United States Navy imposed a naval blockade on the two islands to reduce the opportunities for the Japanese to keep their Attu and Kiska bases supplied. In May, Attu Island was recaptured, with a total of almost 3,000 deaths from both sides combined. The Americans then prepared to attack Kiska in August, only to find that the entire island had been evacuated by the Japanese in late July. During the recapture of Kiska by the United States, 92 men died as a result of friendly fire and a mine, despite no Japanese soldiers being present on the island.

During the 1960s and early 1970s, the United States Atomic Energy Commission (AEC) executed a number of nuclear tests on the island of Amchitka in the face of vehement opposition from environmental and local indigenous groups. The first test, conducted in 1965, caused significant damage to the surrounding area, although the details of this damage were not released to the public until 1969. In 1969, the AEC executed a 'calibration shot' to determine whether Amchitka would be suitable for future tests. In 1970, the AEC announced plans to detonate a bomb named 'Cannikin', set to release a blast 385 times that released by the dropping of an atomic bomb on Hiroshima in 1945. After a United States Supreme Court challenge to the testing failed by one vote, the testing proceeded as scheduled in November 1971.

== Early history ==
In 1853, prior to the purchase of Alaska by the United States, the United States Navy sent the USS Fenimore Cooper to the Aleutian Islands with the aim of locating potential harbors and find coal deposits. No coal deposits were found. In 1867, the United States purchased Alaska from the Russian Empire. By 1869, a number of military posts had been established by the Government of the United States, although the Aleutian Islands did not receive such a post, with the nearest post being located on Kodiak Island. The United States Army made the decision to leave the exploration of the Aleutians to the United States Navy, and the latter showed little interest in doing so. The Aleutian Islands played a small role in the ongoing sealing dispute between the United Kingdom and the United States, which later culminated in the Bering Sea Arbitration. In 1888, following what the United States Government saw as an infringement on the nation's sovereignty by Canadian and Japanese sealers, the United States Navy sent a number of its ships to Unalaska to police the foreign sealers. By 1891, an accord had been reached between the United Kingdom and the United States, and for some time a number of British and American vessels remained in Unalaska to enforce the deal.

By October 1906, many in the U.S. government, including Secretary of State Elihu Root, were worried that war could break out in the Pacific between the United States and Japan. However, the Aleutian Islands were believed to be of little strategic importance to the United States, and were ignored by a number of pre-war strategies formulated by the U.S. armed forces, including the Naval War Board's 1896 plan, which would have brought only a few scout ships to the Islands. In 1911, the Naval War Board considered three options through which Japan could mount an invasion of the United States, one of which involved an attack on the Aleutian Islands. However, this option was discarded by the Board owing to the cold climate of the islands.

The Aleutian Islands played little part in the proceedings of World War I, as the events of this war were concentrated in Europe. In 1922, the Washington Naval Treaty was signed by the United States, the British Empire, the Empire of Japan, the French Third Republic, and the Kingdom of Italy. Article XIX of the Treaty required Japan, Britain and the United States to maintain the status quo in terms of military fortifications in their respective Pacific Rim territories. While Japan and Britain gained a number of exemptions from the terms of Article XIX (for example, Australia and New Zealand were not prevented from building up their fortifications as a result of the Treaty), Japan made it a requirement of their agreement to the Treaty that the Aleutian Islands were not to be exempted.

== The interwar period ==
Although the United States Navy was prevented from developing fortifications on the Aleutian Islands due to the terms of the Washington Naval Treaty, the Navy believed that at some point the United States' treaty obligations would no longer apply, and began to scout the Aleutians for possible naval bases. In 1923, two scouting ships investigated the possibility of establishing anchorages off the Islands, and attempted to claim the United States Army's bases on the Aleutians for the purposes of national security.

After the mid-1920s, little attention was paid to the Aleutian Islands as a potential strategic area. United States President Herbert Hoover did not concentrate his government's resources on developing the nation's military due to the economic challenge posed by the Great Depression. In 1930, one of Hoover's aides claimed that North America's coastal islands would play little part in a potential war between the United States and Japan unless the Navy was rendered ineffective and Canada turned against its southern neighbor. In June 1933, a Japanese ship visited Attu Island three times. Although the ship was purportedly only carrying farming and forestry specialists, John Troy, then the Governor of Alaska, believed that the Aleutian Islands was a possible target for enemy navies and lobbied the federal government for military support. While Major General Benjamin Foulois was willing to commit to deploying more military resources in the resource-rich strip of land stretching from Fairbanks to Anchorage, he was not willing to devote more of his military's resources to the Aleutians, as, according to him, there was "nothing in southeastern Alaska or along the Aleutian Islands which is worth making an effort to defend."

In May 1934, following reports of a Japanese spy operating out of Dutch Harbor, the United States Navy dispatched Edwin T. Layton to the Aleutians to investigate the allegations. The result of this investigation was the arrest of the only Japanese man in the region, as well as the town's only prostitute, a woman accused of conspiring with the Japanese man. During the 1930s, a number of United States governmental committees, boards and reports concluded that air bases in the Aleutians would be for the most part impractical due to the region's inclement weather.

== World War II ==
=== Preparing for battle ===
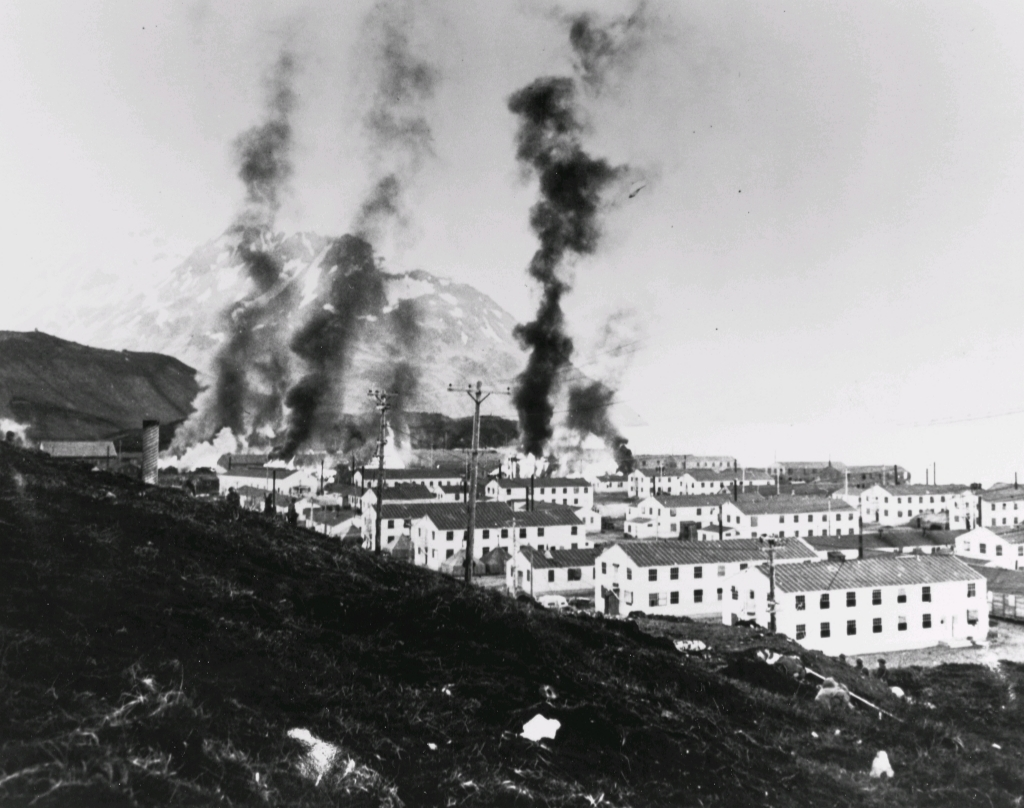
Buildings in Dutch Harbor burn after the June 3, 1942 attacks

On December 7, 1941, the Imperial Japanese Navy executed a surprise attack on Pearl Harbor, bringing the United States into a war against Japan, Nazi Germany and Fascist Italy. The Pacific Theater was divided into three sectors – north, central and south, with the Aleutians falling inside the north sector, though it was also part of the American theater. With the Aleutians located just 650 miles (1,050 km) east of the Kuril Islands, the former served as an ideal physical bridge between the two nations of Japan and the United States. Although dismal climate conditions on the Aleutians made an approach by Japan unlikely, neither of the two countries could afford to not cover their bases with respect to these islands. On April 18, 1942, sixteen United States Army Air Forces (USAAF) aircraft bombed Tokyo in what has become known as the Doolittle Raid. The Imperial High Command were unsure of where the aircraft originated and speculated that a hidden air base existed on the western tip of the Aleutian Islands, sparking interest by the High Command in capturing the island chain.

An early strategic plan by Isoroku Yamamoto involved the occupation of the western Aleutians and Midway Island as a 'decoy' to lure the United States Pacific Fleet away from Pearl Harbor so as to effect the complete destruction of the Hawaiian base before reconstruction efforts could take hold. However, the Aleutians campaign meant that fewer ships could be devoted to the Battle of Midway, a turning point during World War Two. The United States armed forces had broken the Japanese communications code, and were able to learn of the Japanese plan to attack the Aleutians by May 21, 1942. The Imperial Japanese Navy's plan was to attack and hold Attu and Kiska for future use, while inflicting damage on Dutch Harbor and Adak. Once the United States Navy learned of the plan, Admiral Chester W. Nimitz sent a third of his Pacific Fleet to the Aleutian Islands, under orders to hold Dutch Harbor at all costs.

=== The initial attacks ===
By June 1, 1942, the American military contingent on the Aleutians numbered 2,300. On 2 June, a patrol plane spotted a Japanese armada 800 miles (1,300 km) southwest of Dutch Harbor. On June 3, Imperial Japanese Navy Admiral Boshirō Hosogaya ordered some of his aircraft to attack Dutch Harbor, despite rough conditions in the air and on the ground. Only half managed to attack the town, with 17 aircraft arriving in the airspace above Dutch Harbor around 6:00am. Finding themselves confronted by U.S. forces, the aircraft hastily dropped their bombs and quickly returned to their carriers. On June 4, the aircraft returned, and attacked the town's oil storage tanks, a barracks ship and part of the military base's hospital. On that day, 43 Americans died and 64 were wounded. Ten Japanese aircraft were lost, as were 11 American planes. It was the first aerial bombardment of the continental United States by a foreign enemy in history.

On June 6, the Imperial Japanese Navy invaded the Aleutian Islands, occupying Kiska on that day and Attu Island the next. This was significantly the first time United States soil was occupied by a foreign power since the War of 1812, and was the only two invasions of the United States during World War II. Despite the U.S. not posting any forces to oppose the occupation of those islands, the Japanese public was informed of a great triumph over U.S. forces on the islands. The American public feared that the Japanese forces might stage aerial attacks on mainland United States West Coast cities from the recently occupied islands and it was the desire of the Joint Chiefs of Staff to recapture them as quickly as possible. On August 30, 1942, 4,500 U.S. Army troops secured the island of Adak, to be used as a staging post to recapture Kiska and Attu. In two weeks, the United States Army Corps of Engineers had constructed an airfield on the island, and on September 14, a number of Consolidated B-24 Liberators took off from Adak to attack Kiska. Repeated bombings during the fall season convinced the Japanese of the Americans' desire to recapture Kiska and Attu, and by November the Japanese had bolstered troop numbers on the ground on both islands. During the winter months, the short daily sunshine period and inclement weather protected the Japanese from attack.

=== Moving towards Kiska and Attu ===
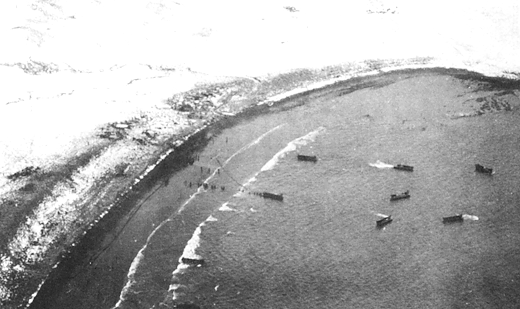
The unopposed landing by the Americans on Amchitka.

On January 11, 1943, U.S. forces captured Amchitka, an island just fifty miles from Kiska. However, challenges faced the Americans stationed there from the outset – on the first night that the Americans spent on the ground, harsh winds destroyed many of the Americans' boats, and on the second night a blizzard reduced the base's line of sight. By mid-February, Army engineers had completed an airfield on the island, after which attacks on the island by the Japanese became less frequent.

With the Americans moving closer towards Kiska and Attu, the Japanese were finding it increasingly difficult to resupply their bases there. In March 1943, Admiral Thomas C. Kinkaid established a naval blockade around the islands, refusing to let Japanese ships through. On March 26, Admiral Hosogaya attempted to break the blockade with eight warships as well as three transports, resulting in the Battle of the Komandorski Islands, the last battle fought only between surface ships in the Pacific War. Following the American victory in this battle, the Japanese were forced to resupply their occupied possessions in the Aleutian chain by submarine.

Following the Battle of the Komandorski Islands, Admiral Kinkaid requested a larger force of 25,000 troops to support an assault on Kiska. However, as there were not enough ships to transport such a large division to the Aleutians, Kinkaid suggested that the Americans' objective change from Kiska, which was defended by about 9,000 men, to Attu, which was home to only 500 Japanese. On April 1, Kinkaid received approval from the Joint Chiefs of Staff to execute the operation, codenamed SANDCRAB. The terrain of Attu Island was not hospitable for such an operation – much of the island's landmass not covered in snowy peaks was covered in muskeg, a marshy soil type that is almost impossible to cross by foot. In addition, Attu Island was subject to frequent storms and soupy fogs.

=== The recapture of Attu Island ===
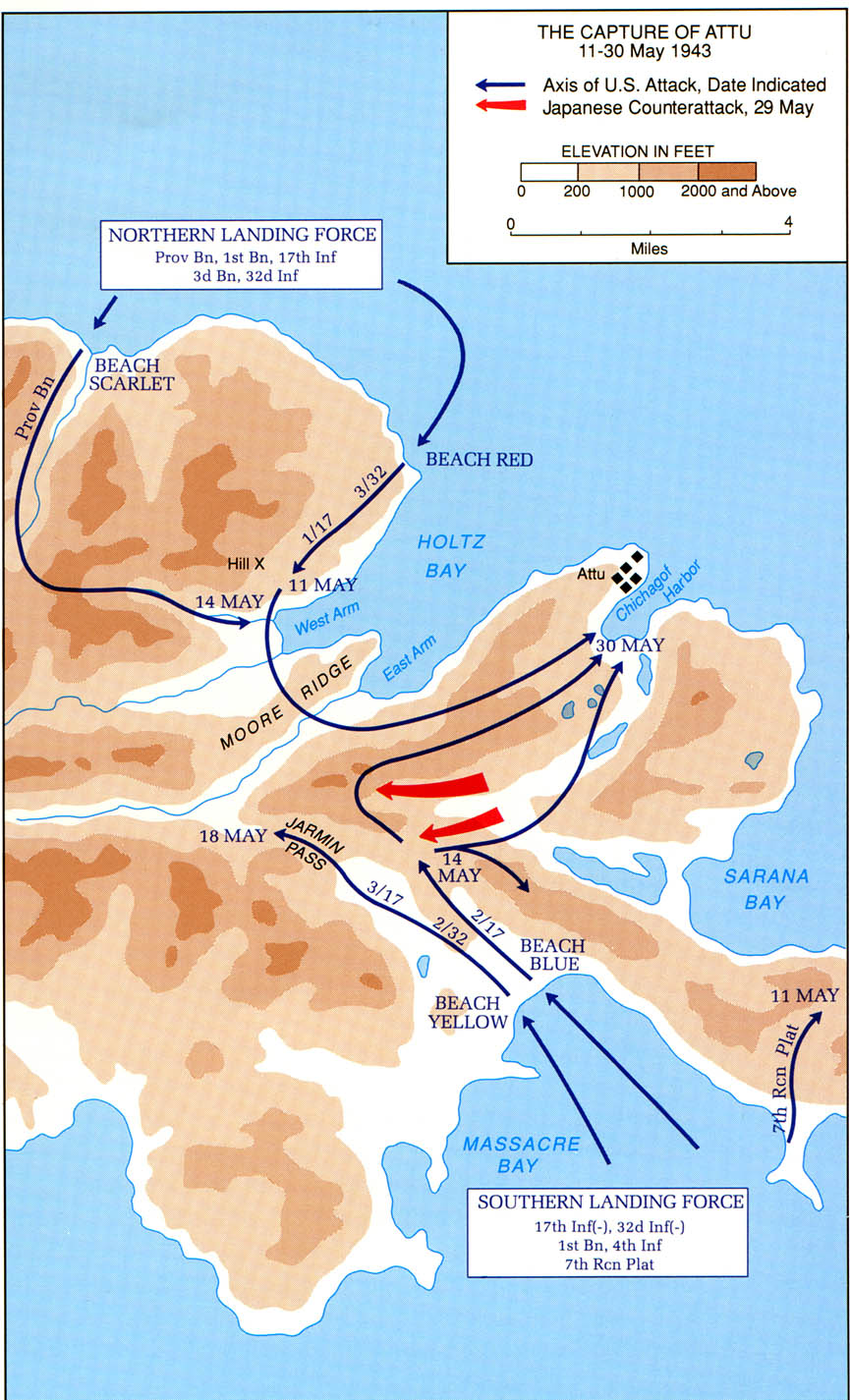
The recapture of Attu Island by American forces.

The 7th Infantry Division was selected to undertake the task of recapturing Attu Island. The division arrived at Cold Bay on April 30, 1943, and, despite the cold weather prevailing in the region, many of the American troops were wearing only regular field clothing as the division had previously been stationed in California. Due to poor weather, the Americans' assault on Attu was delayed twice – first to May 4 and then to May 11. When the operation commenced on May 11, heavy fog shrouded the recapturing force from the Japanese, which hampered the latter's attempts at defending the island.

However, the inclement weather also hampered the Americans' advance, and until May 15 the recapturing forces were unsure of whether the Japanese had held their position or retreated. When the fog lifted on that day, it became clear that the Japanese had retreated further west. However, when the American forces gave chase, they were immediately slowed by an accidental air strike upon them by an American aircraft. By May 29, the Japanese forces numbered only 700–1,000, and these troops attempted to run through the advancing American forces as a last show of defiance against the recapturing forces. By May 30, the Americans had recaptured Attu, and although a few small pockets of Japanese troops remained on the island, the Battle of Attu had essentially concluded.

During the American assault on Attu Island, 2,400 Japanese troops were killed, and only 25 were captured. The Americans' losses were significantly lower, at 566 dead and 1,442 wounded. The bodies of the killed Japanese troops were buried in mass graves on the island – only five per cent of Japanese troops fighting on Attu Island wore dog tags, making identification difficult. In addition, many fallen Japanese were buried by their fellow soldiers up in the island's peaks, and many bodies still remain undiscovered. The American burials were undertaken at Massacre Bay as well as at Holtz Bay – in the former case, the bodies of the soldiers were buried in group graves. Large holes of seven feet in depth were dug by bulldozers, and eight small foot-deep graves were dug at the bottom of each of these holes to serve as the American soldiers' final resting places.

=== The recapture of Kiska ===
With Attu Island secure, the Americans diverted their attention towards forcing the Japanese off Kiska. U.S. intelligence estimated at that point that the number of Japanese troops on Kiska was likely to be 10,000, so Kinkaid deployed 34,426 men, composed of both Americans and Canadians, to the Aleutians to work on recapturing Kiska. With the recapturing operation scheduled to begin on August 15, the Eleventh Air Force dropped 424 tons of bombs on Kiska during the month of July. In addition, the Navy fired 330 tons of shells onto the island during the same period. In late July, the pilots charged with scouting for enemy forces on Kiska reported a sharp decline in the amount of fire received by their planes from Japanese forces on the ground. The Americans believed that one of two events had occurred – either Kiska had been evacuated, or the Japanese had retreated into the hills of Kiska.

By 4:00pm on August 15, a total of 6,500 troops were on the ground on the west side of Kiska. The Canadian contingent came ashore on the north side of the island the next day. However, the invasion was an embarrassment for the Allied forces. The island of Kiska was, in fact, uninhabited – the entire Japanese force of 5,183 men had left the island on July 28 without the Americans noticing. However, the Americans suffered significant casualties during their 'invasion' – 313 men died as a result of accidents, with many dying due to accidental fire. Of the total 313 dead, 70 died when the destroyer USS Abner Read struck a mine, while at least 21 died due to friendly fire. The Japanese had completely deserted their buildings on the island, leaving behind them scrawled messages on the walls for the Allied troops to read – most attacked President of the United States Franklin Roosevelt and Prime Minister of the United Kingdom Winston Churchill; for example, one of the messages read, in a mixture of English and German, "You are dancing by foolische order of Rousebelt [sic]."

On August 24, 1943, Kiska was declared secure by the American forces. The Aleutian Islands campaign was officially over.

For the commanding officers stationed on the Aleutian Islands during the Aleutian Islands campaign, attacking the Kuril Islands from the Aleutians was a logical continuation to recapturing Attu and Kiska. However, these officers faced resistance from their superiors in Washington and their troops on the ground. Troop morale had sharply declined as a result of the island's dismal conditions, creating a condition that the troops called the 'Aleutian stare' amongst those who had been on the island for more than six months. An American assault of the Kuriles never materialized.

== Nuclear testing ==
During the 1960s, the United States Atomic Energy Commission (AEC) conducted nuclear tests on Amchitka. Despite being designated as a national wildlife refuge by President William Taft in 1913, Amchitka was chosen as a nuclear testing site by the AEC. There were several reasons for this decision. Firstly, Amchitka was close to the former Soviet Union, making it an ideal location for a nuclear test to intimidate the latter. However, the public reason given by the AEC was the island's remoteness. Forceful objections were raised against the testing by a number of organisations and groups, most notably the Aleut people, who, although they vacated the island in the 19th century after Russian fur traders reduced sea otter numbers in the area, are resident on nearby islands, and were concerned about radiation leaks as well as potential physical damage resulting from the nuclear tests.

In 1965, the Long Shot nuclear test was executed by the Department of Defense. Almost immediately, fallout from the nuclear test began to leak into adjacent freshwater lakes, although details of this contamination were not made public until 1969. On October 2, 1969, the AEC executed a calibration shot underground to determine whether the island would be a safe place for future tests. However, this test set off a number of reactions in the surrounding area – the test triggered earthquakes and landslides, and sent water from lakes flying 50 feet (15 m) up into the air.

In 1970, the AEC announced plans for another test, named Cannikin. The environmental movement, then in its infancy, vehemently opposed the testing, and filed a suit in the United States Supreme Court to stop the testing. This motion was denied by a 4 to 3 vote. On November 6, 1971, the Cannikin bomb was detonated, creating a 60 feet (18 m) deep crater in the island, killing 1,000 sea otters and thousands of birds. The blast was 385 times that created by the Hiroshima bombing, and was the largest underground test of a nuclear weapon in history.

== Bibliography ==
- Perras, Galen (2003). Stepping stones to nowhere: The Aleutian Islands, Alaska, and American military strategy, 1867–1945. Vancouver: UBC Press. ISBN 0-7748-0990-6.
