= George Price Hays =

United States Army general (1892–1978)

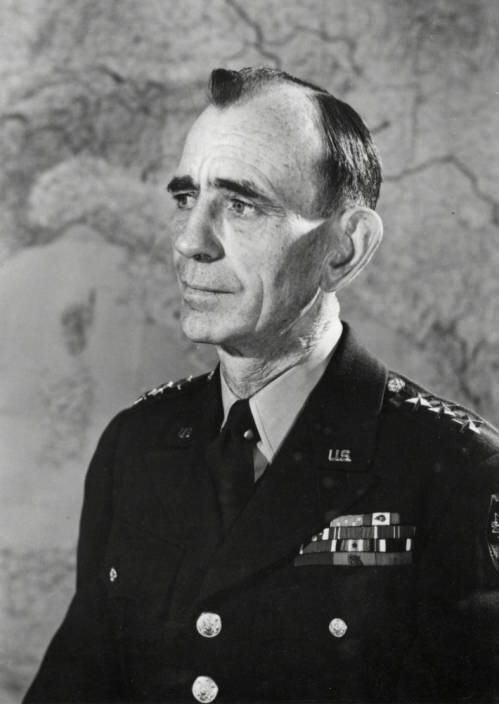
- Born: September 27, 1892; Chefoo, Shandong, Qing China (now Yantai, Shandong, China)
- Died: August 7, 1978 (aged 85); Pinehurst, North Carolina
- Burial place: Arlington National Cemetery, Virginia, United States
- Military career
- Allegiance: United States
- Branch: United States Army
- Service years: 1917–1953
- Rank: Lieutenant General
- Unit: Field Artillery Branch
- Commands: Sixth United States Army; 4th Infantry Division; 10th Mountain Division
- Conflicts: World War I World War II
- Awards: Medal of Honor; Army Distinguished Service Medal; Silver Star (2); Legion of Merit; Bronze Star Medal

Lieutenant General George Price Hays (September 27, 1892 – August 7, 1978) was a United States Army general who served during World War I and World War II. He earned the Medal of Honor as a young artillery officer during the Second Battle of the Marne in World War I. During World War II, he commanded the 10th Mountain Division in the last few months of the Italian Campaign.

== Military career ==
Hays was born on September 27, 1892, in China, where his parents worked as Presbyterian missionaries. He was raised in El Reno, Oklahoma, and attended Oklahoma A&M College (now Oklahoma State University) before leaving school to enlist for World War I.

He was commissioned a second lieutenant in 1917, and by July 14, 1918, was a first lieutenant serving in France with the 10th Field Artillery Regiment, 3rd Division. On that day, during the Second Battle of the Marne near Greves Farm, his unit came under a heavy German artillery barrage and the communication lines were destroyed. Despite the intense fire, Hays rode on horseback between his unit, the command post, and two French batteries for the rest of that day and the next. Although he was severely wounded and had seven horses shot out from under him, his efforts contributed to the halt of the German advance.

For these actions, he was awarded the Medal of Honor the next year, in 1919.

== World War II ==
Remaining in the army during the interwar period, Hays, who was promoted to lieutenant colonel on August 18, 1940, commanded the 99th Field Artillery (Pack) from 1940 to 1941; among his subordinates was Captain William Orlando Darby, who went on to found the U.S. Army Rangers.

After the United States' entry into World War II, Hays, promoted to the temporary rank of colonel on December 24, 1941, participated in the Battle of Monte Cassino in early 1944. He commanded the 2nd Infantry Division's artillery on Omaha Beach during the Normandy landings in June of that year.

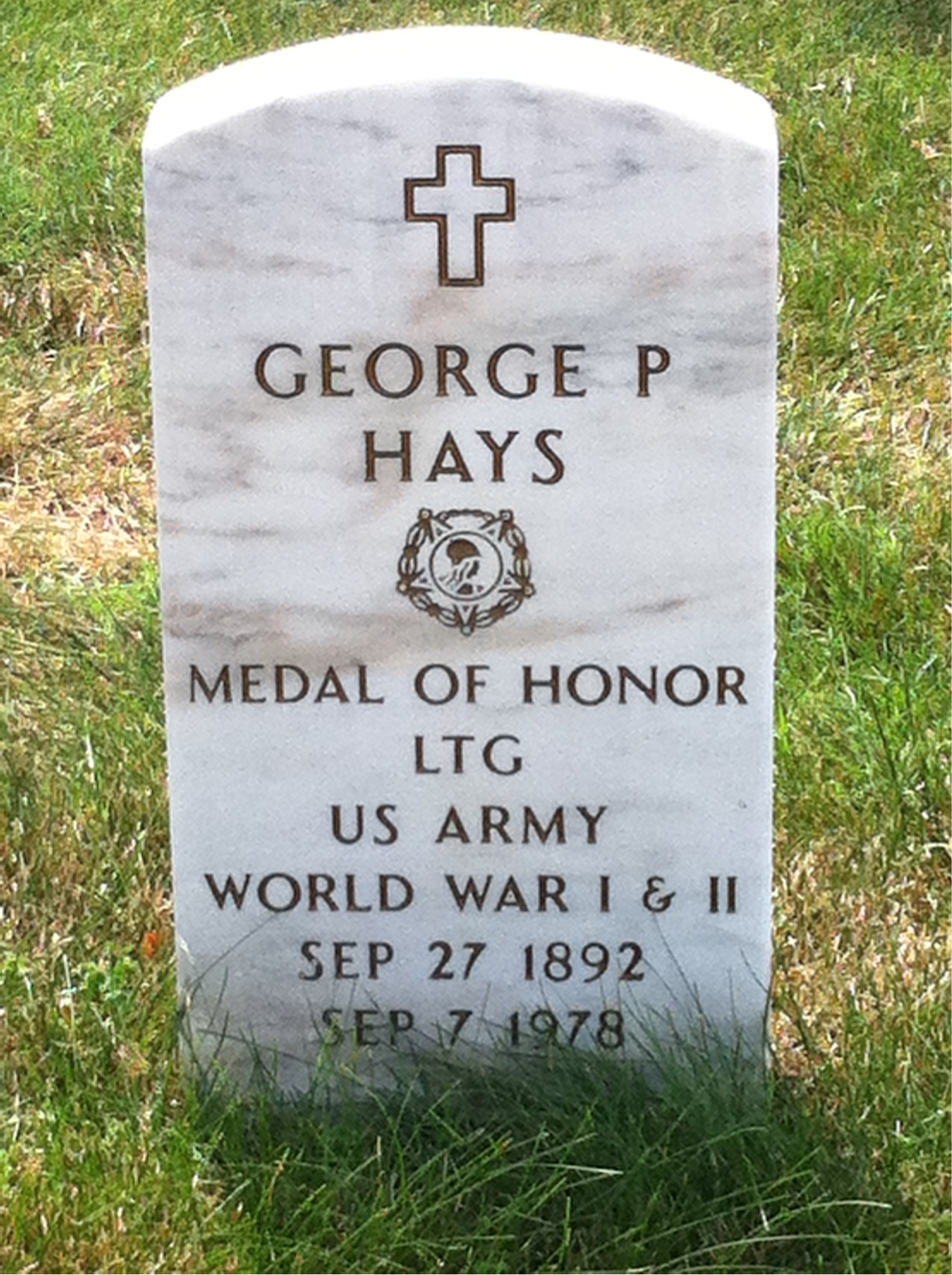
Grave at Arlington National Cemetery

In late November 1944, after returning to the U.S., Hays, promoted to temporary major general on January 3, 1945, assumed command of the 10th Mountain Division when its CG, Major General Lloyd E. Jones, fell ill. After training, the division arrived in Italy in January and fought throughout the spring offensive. On April 24, 1945, Colonel William Darby was assigned as Hays' Assistant Division Commander, but was killed in action six days later.

After the end of the war in Europe, Hays became High Commissioner for the US Occupation Zone in Germany from 1949, and assumed command of the occupation forces or U.S. Forces Austria (USFA) in April 1952, in Salzburg. He retired from the military in 1953, having reached the rank of lieutenant general.

== Awards and honors ==
Medal of Honor
Army Distinguished Service Medal
Silver Star with bronze oak leaf cluster
Legion of Merit
Bronze Star Medal
Purple Heart
World War I Victory Medal with silver campaign star
Army of Occupation of Germany Medal
American Defense Service Medal
American Campaign Medal
European-African-Middle Eastern Campaign Medal with Arrowhead device and silver campaign star
World War II Victory Medal
Army of Occupation Medal with 'Germany' clasp
National Defense Service Medal
Knight of the Legion of Honour (France)
Croix de guerre (France)
War Merit Cross (Italy)
Knight Commander of the Most Excellent Order of the British Empire (United Kingdom)

=== Medal of Honor citation ===
- Rank and organization: First Lieutenant, United States Army, 10th Field Artillery, 3d Division.
- Place and date: Near Greves Farm, France, 14 – July 15, 1918.
- Entered service at: Okarche, Oklahoma.
- Born: September 27, 1892, China.
- General Orders No.34. War Department, 1919.

Citation:

At the very outset of the unprecedented artillery bombardment by the enemy, his line of communication was destroyed beyond repair. Despite the hazard attached to the mission of runner, he immediately set out to establish contact with the neighboring post of command and further establish liaison with 2 French batteries, visiting their position so frequently that he was mainly responsible for the accurate fire therefrom. While thus engaged, 7 horses were shot under him and he was severely wounded. His activity under most severe fire was an important factor in checking the advance of the enemy.

== See also ==
- List of Medal of Honor recipients for World War I

Military offices
Preceded by Lloyd E. Jones	Commanding General 10th Mountain Division; 1944–1945	Succeeded by Post deactivated
Preceded by Harold W. Blakeley	Commanding General 4th Infantry Division; 1945–1946	Succeeded by Jens A. Doe
Preceded by Joseph Stilwell	Commanding General Sixth United States Army; 1946–1947	Succeeded by Mark W. Clark
