= Operation Grommet =

Series of 1970s US nuclear tests

- Grommet Cannikin, 4.8Mt. Largest U.S. Underground nuclear test.

Information
- Country: United States
- Test site: Amchitka Island, Alaska; NTS Area 12, Rainier Mesa; NTS Area 16, Shoshone Mountain; NTS Areas 5, 11, Frenchman Flat; NTS Areas 1–4, 6–10, Yucca Flat
- Period: 1971–1972
- Number of tests: 34
- Test type: underground shaft, tunnel
- Max. yield: 4.8 megatonnes of TNT (20 PJ)

Test series chronology

The United States's Grommet nuclear test series was a group of 34 nuclear tests conducted in 1971–1972. These tests (Note: A bomb test may be a salvo test, defined as two or more explosions "where a period of time between successive individual explosions does not exceed 5 seconds and where the burial points of all explosive devices can be connected by segments of straight lines, each of them connecting two burial points and does not exceed 40 kilometers in length". Mikhailov, V. N. "Catalog of World Wide Nuclear Testing". Begell-Atom. Archived from the original on April 26, 2014.) followed the Operation Emery series and preceded the Operation Toggle series.

== List of the nuclear tests ==
United States' Grommet series tests and detonations
Name (Note: The US, France and Great Britain have code-named their test events, while the USSR and China did not, and therefore have only test numbers (with some exceptions – Soviet peaceful explosions were named). Word translations into English in parentheses unless the name is a proper noun. A dash followed by a number indicates a member of a salvo event. The US also sometimes named the individual explosions in such a salvo test, which results in "name1 – 1 (with name2)". If test is canceled or aborted, then the row data like date and location discloses the intended plans, where known.)	Date time (UT)	Local time zone (Note: To convert the UT time into standard local, add the number of hours in parentheses to the UT time; for local daylight saving time, add one additional hour. If the result is earlier than 00:00, add 24 hours and subtract 1 from the day; if it is 24:00 or later, subtract 24 hours and add 1 to the day. Historical time zone data obtained from the IANA time zone database.)	Location (Note: Rough place name and a latitude/longitude reference; for rocket-carried tests, the launch location is specified before the detonation location, if known. Some locations are extremely accurate; others (like airdrops and space blasts) may be quite inaccurate. "~" indicates a likely pro-forma rough location, shared with other tests in that same area.)	Elevation + height (Note: Elevation is the ground level at the point directly below the explosion relative to sea level; height is the additional distance added or subtracted by tower, balloon, shaft, tunnel, air drop or other contrivance. For rocket bursts the ground level is "N/A". In some cases it is not clear if the height is absolute or relative to ground, for example, Plumbbob/John. No number or units indicates the value is unknown, while "0" means zero. Sorting on this column is by elevation and height added together.)	Delivery (Note: Atmospheric, airdrop, balloon, gun, cruise missile, rocket, surface, tower, and barge are all disallowed by the Partial Nuclear Test Ban Treaty. Sealed shaft and tunnel are underground, and remained useful under the PTBT. Intentional cratering tests are borderline; they occurred under the treaty, were sometimes protested, and generally overlooked if the test was declared to be a peaceful use.) Purpose (Note: Include weapons development, weapon effects, safety test, transport safety test, war, science, joint verification and industrial/peaceful, which may be further broken down.)	Device (Note: Designations for test items where known, "?" indicates some uncertainty about the preceding value, nicknames for particular devices in quotes. This category of information is often not officially disclosed.)	Yield (Note: Estimated energy yield in tons, kilotons, and megatons. A ton of TNT equivalent is defined as 4.184 gigajoules (1 gigacalorie).)	Fallout (Note: Radioactive emission to the atmosphere aside from prompt neutrons, where known. The measured species is only iodine-131 if mentioned, otherwise it is all species. No entry means unknown, probably none if underground and "all" if not; otherwise notation for whether measured on the site only or off the site, where known, and the measured amount of radioactivity released.)	References	Notes
Diamond Mine	July 1, 1971 14:00:00.04	PST (–8 hrs)	NTS Area U16a.06 37.01148°N 116.20427°W	1,896 m (6,220 ft) – 266.15 m (873.2 ft)	tunnel, joint verification		less than 20 kt			Designed to test detection of underground nuclear tests; see Vela Uniform.
Miniata	July 8, 1971 14:00:00.082	PST (–8 hrs)	NTS Area U2bu 37.11018°N 116.05268°W	1,247 m (4,091 ft) – 528.83 m (1,735.0 ft)	underground shaft, peaceful research	Diamond	83 kt	Venting detected, 180 Ci (6,700 GBq)		Project Plowshare – device development.
Bracken	July 9, 1971 14:00:00.16	PST (–8 hrs)	NTS Area U10aq 37.1644°N 116.0336°W	1,297 m (4,255 ft) – 304.8 m (1,000 ft)	underground shaft, weapons development		250 t	Venting detected, 1 Ci (37 GBq)		
Apodaca	July 21, 1971 13:33:00.05	PST (–8 hrs)	NTS Area U3gs 37.01436°N 115.99265°W	1,195 m (3,921 ft) – 241.4 m (792 ft)	underground shaft, weapons development		250 t			
Barranca	August 4, 1971 13:30:00.042	PST (–8 hrs)	NTS Area U3he 37.02606°N 116.02031°W	1,187 m (3,894 ft) – 270.74 m (888.3 ft)	underground shaft, weapons development		less than 20 kt			
Nama-Amarylis – 1	August 5, 1971 18:07:45.2	PST (–8 hrs)	NTS Area U9itsxy3 37.14503°N 116.03417°W	1,273 m (4,177 ft) – 272.8 m (895 ft)	underground shaft, weapons development		less than 20 kt			Simultaneous, separate holes.
Nama-Mephisto – 2	August 5, 1971 18:07:45.2	PST (–8 hrs)	NTS Area U9itsz27 37.14062°N 116.03214°W	1,276 m (4,186 ft) +	underground shaft, weapons development		less than 20 kt			Simultaneous, separate holes.
Baltic	August 6, 1971 14:31:00.16	PST (–8 hrs)	NTS Area U9itss25 37.13843°N 116.04182°W	1,260 m (4,130 ft) – 411.48 m (1,350.0 ft)	underground shaft, weapons development		less than 20 kt			
Algodones	August 18, 1971 14:00:00.03	PST (–8 hrs)	NTS Area U3jn 37.05715°N 116.0372°W	1,206 m (3,957 ft) – 527.61 m (1,731.0 ft)	underground shaft, weapons development		67 kt			
Frijoles-Deming – 1	September 22, 1971 14:00:00.037	PST (–8 hrs)	NTS Area U3jw 37.02158°N 116.01694°W	1,186 m (3,891 ft) – 149.86 m (491.7 ft)	underground shaft, safety experiment		500 t			Simultaneous, separate holes.
Frijoles-Espuela – 2	September 22, 1971 14:00:00.04	PST (–8 hrs)	NTS Area U3ju 37.02268°N 116.01707°W	1,186 m (3,891 ft) +	underground shaft, safety experiment		less than 5 kt			Simultaneous, separate holes.
Frijoles-Guaje – 3	September 22, 1971 14:00:00.04	PST (–8 hrs)	NTS Area U3hf 37.02438°N 116.01603°W	1,186 m (3,891 ft) +	underground shaft, weapons development		less than 5 kt			Simultaneous, separate holes.
Frijoles-Petaca – 4	September 22, 1971 14:00:00.04	PST (–8 hrs)	NTS Area U3hz 37.02193°N 116.01963°W	1,185 m (3,888 ft) +	underground shaft, weapons development		less than 5 kt			Simultaneous, separate holes.
Pedernal	September 29, 1971 14:00:00.04	PST (–8 hrs)	NTS Area U3hg 37.01101°N 116.00809°W	1,180 m (3,870 ft) – 378.68 m (1,242.4 ft)	underground shaft, weapons development		4 kt			
Chantilly	September 29, 1971 14:30:00.14	PST (–8 hrs)	NTS Area U2di 37.12447°N 116.08798°W	1,280 m (4,200 ft) – 330.71 m (1,085.0 ft)	underground shaft, weapons development		less than 20 kt			
Cathay	October 8, 1971 14:30:00.15	PST (–8 hrs)	NTS Area U9ch 37.11373°N 116.0382°W	1,261 m (4,137 ft) – 377.95 m (1,240.0 ft)	underground shaft, weapons development		7 kt			
Lagoon	October 14, 1971 14:30:00.16	PST (–8 hrs)	NTS Area U10ar 37.17987°N 116.05396°W	1,286 m (4,219 ft) – 304.8 m (1,000 ft)	underground shaft, weapons development		5 kt			
Cannikin	November 6, 1971 22:00:00.06	BST (–11 hrs)	Amchitka Island, Alaska 51.4699°N 179.10671°E	63 m (207 ft) – 1,790 m (5,870 ft)	underground shaft, weapons development		4.8 Mt			A test of the Spartan ABM warhead. The largest underground nuclear test ever.
Diagonal Line	November 24, 1971 20:15:00.17	PST (–8 hrs)	NTS Area U11g 36.8793°N 115.93587°W	1,010 m (3,310 ft) – 264.26 m (867.0 ft)	underground shaft, weapon effect		4 kt	Venting detected off site, 6.8 kCi (250 TBq)		Picture of the "Ship of the Desert", a structure for capturing neutrons for experiments with this test: File:NNSA-NSO-1347.jpg.
Parnassia	November 30, 1971 15:45:00.15	PST (–8 hrs)	NTS Area U2bc 37.16045°N 116.07112°W	1,302 m (4,272 ft) – 330.71 m (1,085.0 ft)	underground shaft, weapons development		10 kt			
Chaenactis	December 14, 1971 21:09:59.16	PST (–8 hrs)	NTS Area U2dl 37.12393°N 116.09049°W	1,281 m (4,203 ft) – 331.01 m (1,086.0 ft)	underground shaft, weapons development		24 kt			
Hospah	December 14, 1971 21:10:01.04	PST (–8 hrs)	NTS Area U3je 37.02584°N 116.02992°W	1,188 m (3,898 ft) – 302.03 m (990.9 ft)	underground shaft, weapons development		11 kt			
Yerba	December 14, 1971 21:10:01.04	PST (–8 hrs)	NTS Area U1c 37.02317°N 116.05957°W	1,202 m (3,944 ft) – 331.99 m (1,089.2 ft)	underground shaft, weapons development		5 kt			
Mescalero	January 5, 1972 15:10:00.04	PST (–8 hrs)	NTS Area U3gu 37.04565°N 116.03032°W	1,198 m (3,930 ft) – 120.24 m (394.5 ft)	underground shaft, weapons development		less than 20 kt			
Cowles	February 3, 1972 21:45:00.04	PST (–8 hrs)	NTS Area U3hx 37.00105°N 116.02016°W	1,178 m (3,865 ft) – 301.78 m (990.1 ft)	underground shaft, weapons development		2 kt			
Dianthus	February 17, 1972 19:02:00.16	PST (–8 hrs)	NTS Area U10at 37.16566°N 116.05711°W	1,279 m (4,196 ft) – 304.8 m (1,000 ft)	underground shaft, weapons development		3.5 kt	Venting detected, 18 Ci (670 GBq)		
Sappho	March 23, 1972 18:50:00.16	PST (–8 hrs)	NTS Area U2dh2 37.113°N 116.08169°W	1,266 m (4,154 ft) – 197.82 m (649.0 ft)	underground shaft, weapons development		4 kt	Venting detected, 9 Ci (330 GBq)		
Ocate – 2 (with Onaja)	March 30, 1972 21:00:00.08	PST (–8 hrs)	NTS Area U3jp 37.00449°N 116.01565°W	1,179 m (3,868 ft) +	underground shaft, weapons development		less than 20 kt			
Onaja – 1 (with Ocate)	March 30, 1972 21:00:00.04	PST (–8 hrs)	NTS Area U3js 37.0055°N 116.02078°W	1,180 m (3,870 ft) – 279.04 m (915.5 ft)	underground shaft, weapons development		8 kt			
Longchamps	April 19, 1972 16:32:00.16	PST (–8 hrs)	NTS Area U2dm 37.12204°N 116.08486°W	1,276 m (4,186 ft) – 326.44 m (1,071.0 ft)	underground shaft, weapons development		8 kt			
Jicarilla	April 19, 1972 16:42:00.05	PST (–8 hrs)	NTS Area U3jm 37.00661°N 116.01734°W	1,180 m (3,870 ft) – 148.11 m (485.9 ft)	underground shaft, weapons development		less than 20 kt			
Misty North	May 2, 1972 19:15:00.04	PST (–8 hrs)	NTS Area U12n.05 37.20762°N 116.20963°W	2,199 m (7,215 ft) – 376.08 m (1,233.9 ft)	tunnel, weapon effect		19 kt			
Kara	May 11, 1972 14:00:00.16	PST (–8 hrs)	NTS Area U2dh3 37.11247°N 116.08525°W	1,267 m (4,157 ft) – 259.08 m (850.0 ft)	underground shaft, weapons development		500 t	Venting detected, 7 Ci (260 GBq)		
Zinnia	May 17, 1972 14:10:00.16	PST (–8 hrs)	NTS Area U2dk 37.12056°N 116.08883°W	1,277 m (4,190 ft) – 322.78 m (1,059.0 ft)	underground shaft, weapons development		8 kt	Venting detected, 7 Ci (260 GBq)		
Monero	May 19, 1972 17:00:00.05	PST (–8 hrs)	NTS Area U3jg 37.06469°N 116.0025°W	1,245 m (4,085 ft) – 537.35 m (1,763.0 ft)	underground shaft, weapons development		12 kt			
Merida	June 7, 1972 15:20:00.16	PST (–8 hrs)	NTS Area U2dn 37.11579°N 116.08619°W	1,271 m (4,170 ft) – 204.22 m (670.0 ft)	underground shaft, weapons development		800 t	Venting detected, 10 Ci (370 GBq)		
Capitan	June 28, 1972 14:41:00.19	PST (–8 hrs)	NTS Area U3jj 36.99256°N 116.02302°W	1,175 m (3,855 ft) – 134.48 m (441.2 ft)	underground shaft, weapons development		600 t			
Tajique	June 28, 1972 16:30:00.07	PST (–8 hrs)	NTS Area U7aa 37.06958°N 115.99286°W	1,274 m (4,180 ft) – 332.31 m (1,090.3 ft)	underground shaft, weapons development		less than 20 kt			
Haplopappus	June 28, 1972 16:30:03.16	PST (–8 hrs)	NTS Area U9itsw22 37.13515°N 116.03614°W	1,264 m (4,147 ft) – 184.4 m (605 ft)	underground shaft, weapons development		6 kt			
