= Amchitka Island =

Island in Alaska, United States

Native name: Amchixtax̂
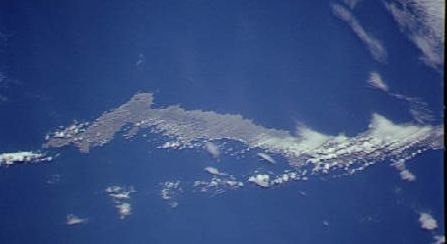
- Amchitka Island from space

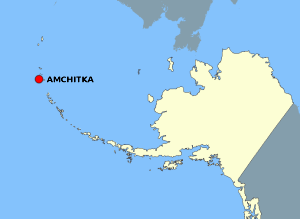
- Interactive map of Amchitka Island

Geography
- Location: Bering Sea
- Archipelago: Aleutian Islands
- Area: 74,240 acres (30,040 ha)
- Length: 42 mi (68 km)
- Width: 1−4 mi (-5 km)

Administration
- United States
- State: Alaska
- Census Area: Aleutians West

Demographics
- Population: None (since 1832)

Amchitka Island (/æmˈtʃɪtkə/; Aleut: Amchixtax̂) is a volcanic, tectonically unstable and uninhabited island in the Rat Islands group of the Aleutian Islands in southwest Alaska. It is part of the Alaska Maritime National Wildlife Refuge. The island, with a land area of roughly 116 square miles (300 km^{2}), is about 42 miles (68 km) long and 1 to 4 miles (1.6 to 6.4 km) wide. The area has a maritime climate, with many storms, and mostly overcast skies.

Amchitka was populated for more than 2,500 years by the Aleut people, but has had no permanent population since 1832. The island has been part of the United States since the Alaska Purchase of 1867. During World War II, it was used as an airfield by US forces in the Aleutian Islands Campaign.

Amchitka Island was selected by the United States Atomic Energy Commission (AEC) to be the site for underground detonations of nuclear weapons. Three such tests were carried out: Long Shot, an 80-kiloton (330 TJ) blast in 1965; Milrow, a 1-megaton (4.2 PJ) blast in 1969; and Cannikin in 1971 – at 5 Mt (21 PJ), the largest underground test ever conducted by the United States. The tests were highly controversial, with environmental groups fearing that the Cannikin explosion, in particular, would cause severe earthquakes and tsunamis. Amchitka Island is no longer used for nuclear testing. It is still monitored for the leakage of radioactive materials.

== Geography ==
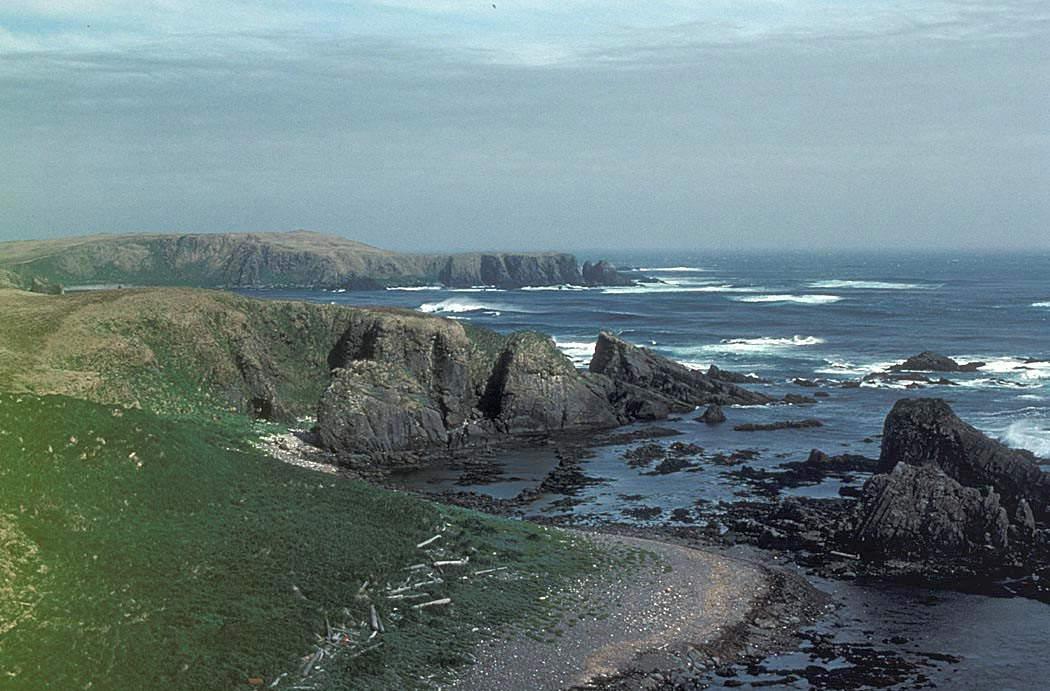
Amchitka Island, Harlequin Beach

Amchitka Island is the southernmost of the Rat Islands group in the Aleutian Chain, located between 51°21′N 178°37′E and 51°39′N 179°29′E. It is bounded by the Bering Sea to the north and east, and the Pacific Ocean to the south and west.

The eastern part of the island is a lowland plateau, with isolated ponds and gently rolling hills. There is low but abundant vegetation, consisting of mosses, lichens, liverworts, ferns, grasses, sedges, and crowberry. The center of the island is mountainous, and the western end is barren and vegetation is sparse.

Amchitka Island has a maritime climate, often foggy and windswept, with cloud cover 98 percent of the time. While temperatures are moderated by the ocean, storms are frequent. Geologically, the island is volcanic, being a part of a small crustal block on the Aleutian Arc that is being torn apart by oblique subduction. It is "one of the least stable tectonic environments in the United States."

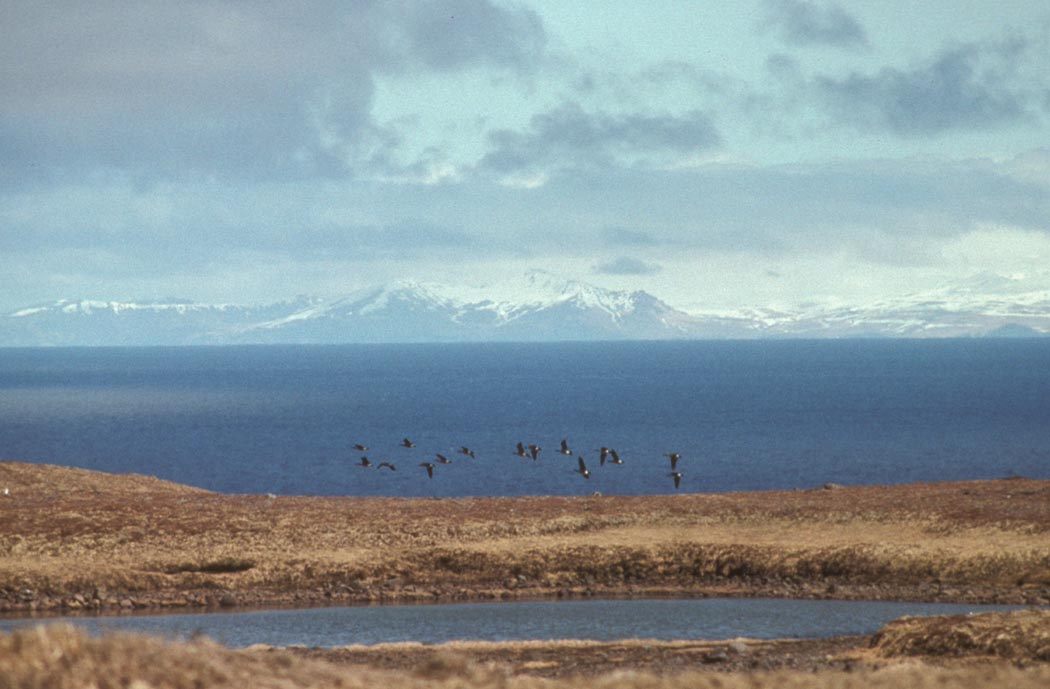
Aleutian cackling geese in flight over Amchitka Island

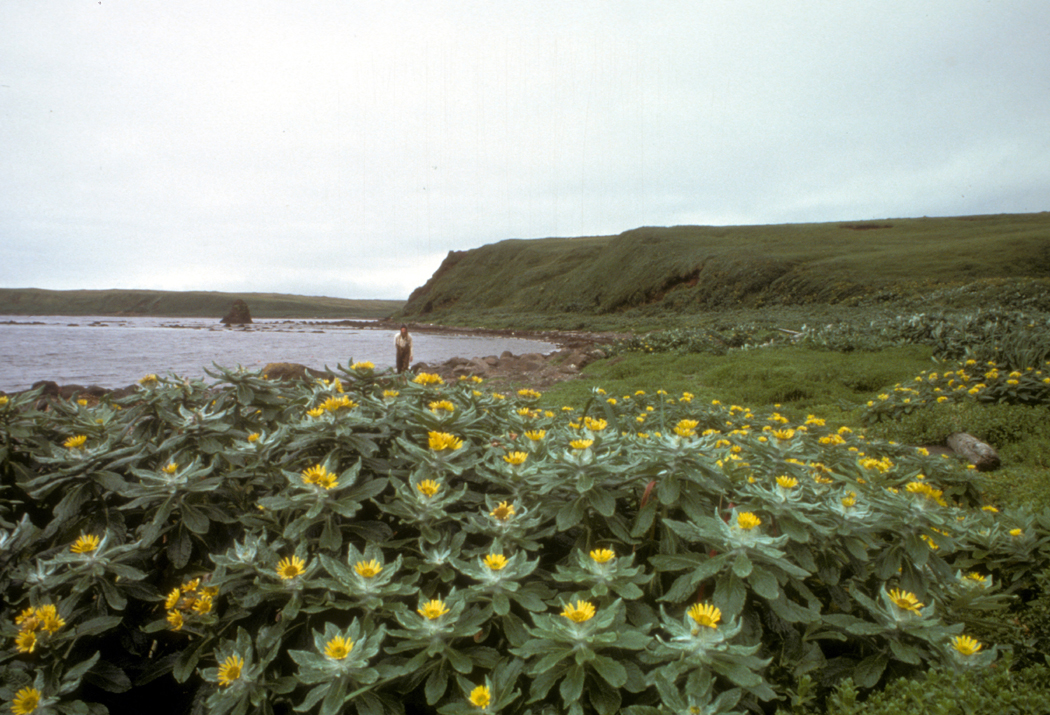
Amchitka Island, beach fleabane in full bloom (Senecio pseudo-arnica)

== Early history ==
The human history of Amchitka Island dates back at least 2,500 years, with the Aleut people. Human remains, thought to be of an Aleut dating from about 1000 AD, were discovered in 1980.

Amchitka Island is said to have been seen and named St. Makarius by Vitus Bering in 1741, was sighted by Joseph Billings in 1790, and visited by Shishmaref in 1820.

In 1783, Daikokuya Kōdayū and 15 Japanese castaways landed on Amchitka Island after drifting for seven months. The castaways were taken care of by Russian employees of Zhigarev and hunted with indigenous people. Six of the castaways died in three years.

== World War II and after ==
In June 1942, the Japanese occupied some of the western Aleutian islands, and hoped to occupy Amchitka. Eager to remove the Japanese, the Joint Chiefs of Staff agreed to move quickly to regain the territory. American planners decided to build a series of airfields to the west of Umnak, from which bombers could attack the invading forces.

The United States Army established bases at Adak and 13 other locations. At the War Department's suggestion, an initial reconnaissance of Amchitka was carried out in September 1942, finding that it would be difficult to build an airstrip on the island. Nevertheless, planners decided on December 13 that the airfield "had to be built" to prevent the Japanese from doing the same. A further reconnaissance mission visited Amchitka from 17 to 19 December, and reported that a fighter strip could be built in two to three weeks, and a main airfield in three to four months. The plan was approved and began in 1942.

American forces made an unopposed landing on Amchitka Island on January 12, 1943. Despite facing difficult weather conditions and bombing from the Japanese, they made the airfield usable by February 16. The Alaska Command was now 80 km (50 mi) away from their target, Kiska. The military eventually built numerous buildings, roads, and a total of three airstrips on the island, one of which would later be rebuilt and used by the Atomic Energy Commission in the late 1960s. At its peak, the occupancy of Amchitka Island reached 15,000 troops.

The Aleutian Islands campaign was successfully completed on August 24, 1943. In that month, a strategic intercept station was established on the island, remaining until February 1945. On 31 December 1949 the Air Force base was closed due to insufficient personnel and staff. The Army closed its communications facility at Amchitka Island in August 1950. On 31 December 1950 the Air Force 2107th Air Weather Group withdrew the last of its personnel from Amchitka Island and the facility was abandoned.

The site later hosted an Air Force White Alice Communications System from 1959 to 1961, and a temporary relay station in the 1960s and 1970s. A prototype Relocatable Over-the-Horizon Radar system existed on Amchitka Island between 1991 and 1993 to conduct surveillance on Russia.

== Demographics ==
Amchitka first appeared as a census-designated place (CDP) on the 1990 U.S. Census with a population of 25. This was the only time it appeared on the census, and the CDP was abolished in 2000.

== Nuclear testing ==
Amchitka Underground Test Site
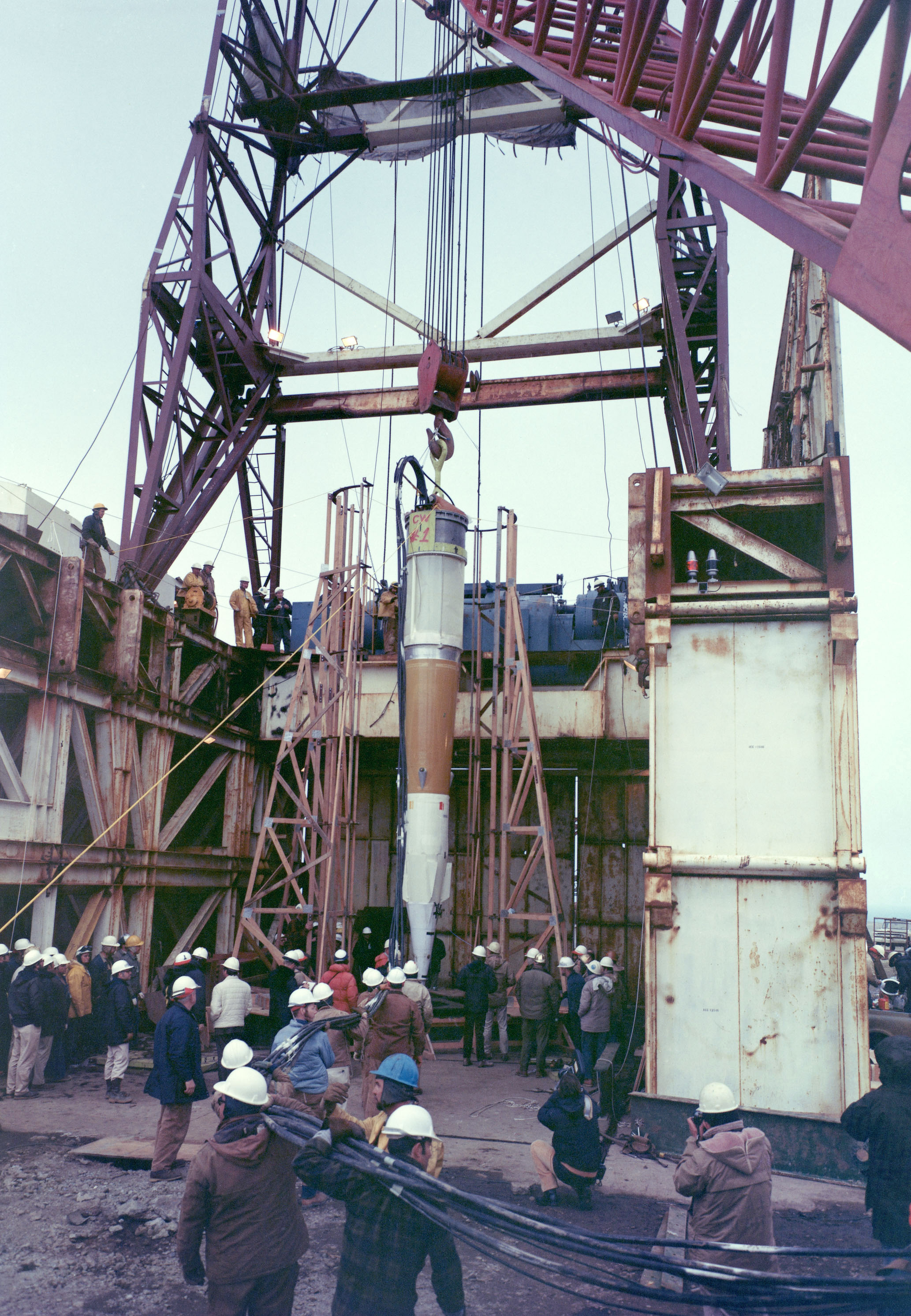
- Cannikin warhead being lowered into test shaft

Site information
- Type: Nuclear testing range
- Operator: United States Department of Energy
- Status: Inactive

Location
- Location of the sites for the nuclear testing
- Coordinates: 51°32′32″N 178°59′00″E

Site history
- In use: 1965–1971

Test information
- Nuclear tests: 8
- Thermonuclear tests: 3
- Remediation: 2001–2025 (DoE estimate)

With the pullout of military forces from Amchitka in 1950, the Department of Defense (DoD) initially considered the island for nuclear testing planned for 1951, under Operation Windstorm. Requiring information about the cratering potential of nuclear weapons, plans were made to detonate two 20-kiloton (84 TJ) devices. After approximately 34 test holes had been drilled, the site was deemed unsuitable, and the project was moved to the Nevada test site.

In the late 1950s, scientists realized that improved seismological knowledge was necessary for the detection of Soviet underground nuclear explosions. The 1.7-kiloton (7.1 TJ) Rainier test (part of Operation Plumbbob, performed in Nevada) produced strong seismic signals, but looked much like an ordinary earthquake. In 1959, Dr. James R. Killian, the Special Assistant to the President for Science and Technology, formed the Panel on Seismic Improvement (which subsequently recommended the program that came to be known as Vela Uniform), with the twin goals of improving seismic instruments and deploying them globally, and researching in more depth the seismic effects of nuclear explosions. The project was subsequently initiated by the Eisenhower administration.

Together with the Atomic Energy Commission, the DoD began assessing Amchitka Island for atmospheric tests of very high-yield thermonuclear weapon effects as part of the Vela Uniform nuclear test program, under Project Rufus, and later, Project Larkspur, using a pre-existing Vela Uniform program for underground testing as a cover. The Partial Nuclear Test Ban Treaty of 1963 ended investigation of Amchitka as a site for atmospheric testing, but work continued on underground test preparations.

=== Long Shot test ===
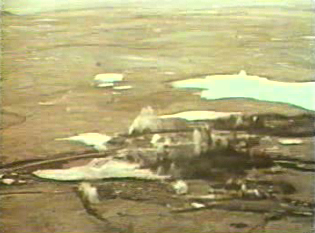
This film still shows dirt being displaced from the Long Shot underground test.

To conduct the Vela Uniform test Long Shot,^{51°25′35.84″N 179°11′14.13″E} the Department of Defense occupied Amchitka from 1964 to 1966, with the AEC providing the device, measuring instruments, and scientific support. The goal was "to determine the behavior and characteristics of seismic signals generated by nuclear detonations and to differentiate them from seismic signals generated by naturally occurring earthquakes."

Although it would not be publicly announced until March 18, 1965, senior Alaskan officials were notified the previous February. After the devastating Great Alaska earthquake of March 27, 1964, the governor expressed concern about the psychological effects of the test on the populace. He was quickly reassured.

Long Shot was detonated on October 29, 1965, and the yield was 80 kilotons (330 TJ). It was the first underground test in a remote area, and the first test managed by the DoD. While there was no surface collapse,tritium and krypton were found at the surface following the test; this was not made public until 1969.

=== Milrow and Cannikin tests ===
Though performed as part of the Nuclear Weapons Testing Program, "[the] purpose of the Milrow test was to test an island, not a weapon." It was a "calibration shot", intended to produce data from which the impact of larger explosions could be predicted, and specifically, to determine whether the planned Cannikin detonation could be performed safely. Milrow was detonated on October 2, 1969 ^{51°24′52.06″N 179°10′44.84″E}, with an approximate yield of 1 to 1.2 megatons (4.2–5.0 PJ).

The shockwave reached the surface with an acceleration of over 35 g (340 m/s^{2}), causing a dome of the Earth's surface, approximately 3 km (2 mi) in radius, to rise about 5 meters (16 ft). The blast "turned the surrounding sea to froth" and "forced geysers of mud and water from local streams and lakes 50 feet (15 m) into the air". A "surface collapse feature", also known as a subsidence crater, was formed by material collapsing into the cavity formed by the explosion.

Cannikin was intended to test the design of the Spartan anti-ballistic missile (ABM) interceptor – a high-yield warhead that "produced copious amounts of x-rays and minimized fission output and debris to prevent blackout of ABM radar systems." The test would "measure the yield of the device, measure the x-ray flux and spectrum, and assure deployment of a reliable design."

==== Controversy ====
A few days after the Milrow test, the Don't Make A Wave Committee was organized at a meeting in Vancouver, British Columbia, Canada. The committee's name referred to predictions made by a Vancouver journalist named Bob Hunter, later to become a member of Greenpeace. He wrote that the test would cause earthquakes and a tsunami. On the agenda was whether to fight another blast at the island, or whether to expand their efforts to fight all perceived threats against the environment. As he was leaving, one man gave the traditional farewell of the peace-activist movement "Peace" – to which another member replied "Make it a green peace". The committee would later become Greenpeace.

The AEC considered the likelihood of the test triggering a severe earthquake "very unlikely", unless one was already imminent on a nearby fault, and considered a tsunami "even more unlikely". Others disagreed. Russell Train, then Chairman of the Council on Environmental Quality, argued that "experience with Milrow ... does not provide a sure basis for extrapolation. In the highly nonlinear phenomena involved in earthquake generation, there may be a threshold value of the strain that must be exceeded prior to initiation of a large earthquake. ... The underground explosion could serve as the first domino of the row of dominoes leading to a major earthquake. ... as in the case of earthquakes it is not possible at this time to assess quantitatively the probability of a tsunami following the explosion."

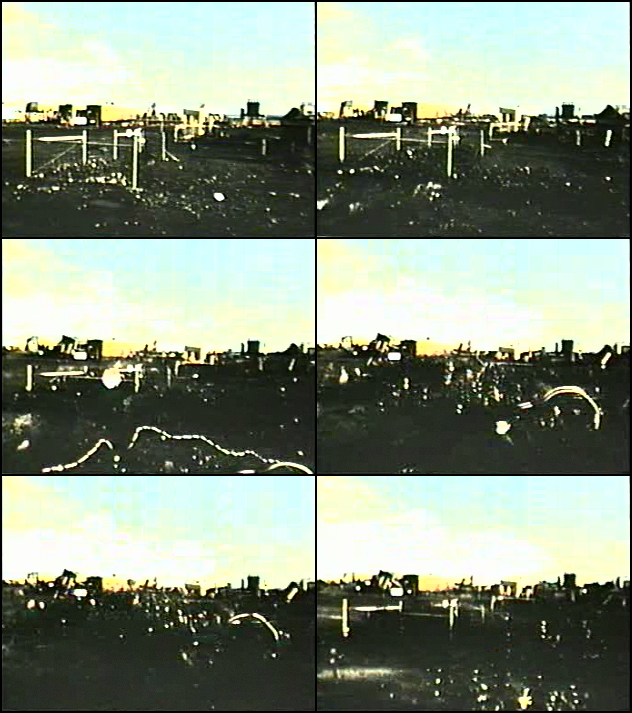
Film stills from the Cannikin test show the effects on the surface of the 5-megaton (21 PJ) detonation below, equivalent to a 7.0 earthquake.

In July 1971, a group called the Committee for Nuclear Responsibility filed suit against the AEC, asking the court to stop the test. The suit was unsuccessful, with the Supreme Court denying the injunction by 4 votes to 3, and Richard Nixon personally authorized the $200 million test, in spite of objections from Japan, Peru, and Sweden. "What the Court didn't know, however, was that six federal agencies, including the departments of State and Interior, and the fledgling EPA, had lodged serious objections to the Cannikin test, ranging from environmental and health concerns to legal and diplomatic problems. Nixon issued an executive order to keep the comments from being released." The Don't Make A Wave Committee chartered a boat, in which they had intended to sail to the island in protest, but due to postponement of the test and interference from the U.S. Coast Guard, they were unable to observe the test.

==== Cannikin tested ====
Cannikin was detonated on November 6, 1971 ^{51°28′13.20″N 179°6′40.75″E}, as the thirteenth test of the Operation Grommet (1971–1972) underground nuclear test series. The announced yield was 5 megatons (21 PJ) – the largest underground nuclear test in U.S. history. (Estimates for the precise yield range from 4.4 to 5.2 megatons or 18 to 22 PJ). The ground lifted 20 feet (6 m), caused by an explosive force almost 400 times the power of the Hiroshima bomb. Subsidence and faulting at the site created a new lake, several hundred meters wide. The explosion caused a seismic shock of 7.0 on the Richter scale, causing rockfalls and turf slides of a total of 35,000 square feet (3,300 m^{2}). Though earthquakes and tsunamis predicted by environmentalists did not occur, a number of small tectonic events did occur in the following weeks (some registering as high as 4.0 on the Richter scale), thought to be due to the interaction of the explosion with local tectonic stresses.

=== 1973 and beyond ===
The AEC withdrew from the island in 1973, though scientists continue to visit the island for monitoring purposes. In 2001, the DoE returned to the site to remove environmental contamination. Drilling mud pits were stabilized by mixing with clean soil, covering with a polyester membrane, topped with soil and re-seeded.

Concerns have been expressed that new fissures may be opening underground, allowing radioactive materials to leak into the ocean. A 1996 Greenpeace study found that Cannikin was leaking both plutonium and americium into the environment. In 2004, scientific divers from the University of Alaska Fairbanks collected shallow subtidal organisms and reported that "There were no indications of any radioactive leakage, and all that was really wonderful news." Similar findings are reported by a 2006 study, which found that levels of plutonium "were very small and not significant biologically".

The Department of Energy continues to monitor the site as part of their remediation program. This is expected to continue until 2025, after which the site is intended to become a restricted access wildlife preserve.

Nuclear tests at Amchitka
Name	Date (GMT)	Location	Yield	Type
Long Shot	21:00, October 29, 1965	51.43655°N 179.17976°E	80 kt (330 TJ)	2,343 ft (714 m) shaft
Milrow	22:06, October 2, 1969	51.41559°N 179.17992°E	~ 1 Mt (4.2 PJ)	4,002 ft (1,220 m) shaft
Cannikin	22:00, November 6, 1971	51.46961°N 179.10335°E	< 5 Mt (21 PJ)	6,104 ft (1,860 m) shaft
