= LIM-49 Spartan =

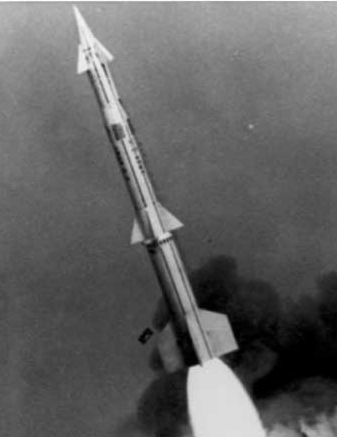
- Type: Anti-ballistic missile
- Place of origin: United States

Service history
- In service: 1975-1976

Production history
- Manufacturer: Western Electric & McDonnell Douglas

Specifications
- Mass: 29,000 lb (13,100 kg)
- Length: 55 ft 2 in (16.8 m)
- Diameter: 3 ft 7 in (1.08 m)
- Wingspan: 9 ft 9.6 in (2.98 m)
- Warhead: W71 nuclear; 5 megatonnes of TNT (21 PJ)
- Engine: 1st Stage: Thiokol TX-500 (2200 kN); 2nd Stage: Thiokol TX-454; 3rd Stage: Thiokol TX-239
- Propellant: Solid fuel
- Operational range: 460 mi (740 km)
- Flight altitude: 350 mi (560 km)
- Maximum speed: >Mach 3-4
- Guidance system: Radio command
- Launch platform: Silo

The LIM-49 Spartan was a United States Army anti-ballistic missile, designed to intercept attacking nuclear warheads from intercontinental ballistic missiles at long range and while still outside the atmosphere. For actual deployment, a five-megaton thermonuclear warhead was planned to destroy the incoming ICBM warheads. It was part of the Safeguard Program.

The Spartan was the latest and, as it turned out, final development in a long series of missile designs from the team of Bell Laboratories and Douglas Aircraft Company that started in the 1940s with the Nike. Spartan was developed directly from the preceding LIM-49 Nike Zeus, retaining the same tri-service identifier, but growing larger and longer ranged, from the Zeus' 250 nautical miles (460 km; 290 mi) to approximately 450 nautical miles (830 km; 520 mi).

The Spartan was superseded by the Nike-X project, later becoming the Sentinel Program. This was eventually cancelled and replaced with the much smaller Safeguard Program. Spartans were deployed as part of the Safeguard system from October 1975 to early 1976.

== History ==
=== Zeus ===
The US Army started their first serious efforts in the anti-ballistic missile arena when they asked the Bell Labs missile team to prepare a report on the topic in February 1955. The Nike team had already designed the Nike Ajax system that was in widespread use around the US, as well as the Nike Hercules that was in the late stages of development as the Ajax's replacement. They returned an initial study on Nike II in January 1956, Concluding that the fundamental concept was feasible, utilizing a slightly enhanced iteration of the Hercules missile, but requiring dramatically upgraded radars and computers to handle interceptions that took place at thousands of miles an hour.

Work began on the resulting LIM-49 Nike Zeus system in January 1957, initially at a low priority. However, several developments that year, including the development of the first Soviet ICBMs and the launch of Sputnik I, caused the schedule to be pushed up several times. In January 1958 Zeus was given "S-Priority", the highest national priority, with aims to deploy the first operational sites in 1963.

To test the system fully, the Army took control of Kwajalein Island from the US Navy, and began building an entire Zeus site on the island. By 1962 the system was ready for testing, and after some initial problems, demonstrated its ability to intercept warheads launched from California. Eventually fourteen "all up" tests were carried out over the next two years, with ten of them bringing the missile within the lethal radius of its warhead, sometimes within a few hundred meters.

=== Cancellation ===
In spite of Zeus' successful testing program and interceptions, it was becoming increasingly clear that the fully integrated system would not be effective in an actual operational scenario. This was due primarily to two problems; decoys shielding the warhead from detection until it was too late for interception, and the rapid increase in the number of deployed ICBMs which threatened to overwhelm the system.

The former problem was becoming increasingly apparent beginning in approximately 1957. Missiles designed to carry a specific warhead began having increasing levels of excess throw-weight as warhead design improved, resulting in smaller and lighter warheads. Missile design improved as well, further increasing excess capacity. Even a small amount of excess capacity could be used to carry radar decoys or chaff, which is very light weight, and would create additional radar returns that would act indistinguishably from those of the real warhead, in the airless, exo-atmospheric vacuum of sub-orbital space where the missile intercept was planned.

In that environment it would be difficult to pick out the warhead. As long as the decoys spread out or the chaff blocked an area larger than the lethal radius of the 5 Megaton (Mt) interceptor (much smaller in space than in the atmosphere), several interceptors would have to be launched to guarantee the warhead would be hit. Adding more decoys was extremely inexpensive, requiring very expensive ABMs to be added in response.

At the same time, both the US and USSR were in the midst of introducing their first truly mass-produced ICBMs, and their numbers were clearly going to grow dramatically during the early 1960s. Zeus, like Hercules and Ajax before it, used mechanically directed radar dishes that could track only one target and one interceptor at a time. It was planned that Zeus bases would actually consist of several launcher sites connected to a central control, but even in this case, the site might be able to guide four to six missiles simultaneously. As the ICBM fleet numbered hundreds even before Zeus could become operational, it would be simple to overcome the defense by directing sufficient warheads over it to overwhelm its ability to guide interceptions rapidly enough.

=== Nike X ===
The solution to both of these problems was to improve speed of both the defending missiles, and the defensive system as a whole.

Decoys are less dense than warheads, though with the same aerodynamics. Therefore, they are subject to more deceleration when they begin their reentry of the upper atmosphere. The warhead, which is dense and streamlined, experiences less deceleration from air resistance, eventually passing by the decoys. The rate at which this happens depends on the types of decoys used, but the warhead will have passed even advanced types of decoy by the time it is 250,000–100,000 feet (76,000–30,000 m). At this point the warhead is vulnerable to attack, but is only 5 to 10 seconds from its planned detonation (air burst or ground burst). To address these issues, a very high speed missile was required. Zeus was simply not fast enough to perform such an attack; it was designed for interceptions lasting about two minutes.

Likewise, the solution to dealing with massive numbers of warheads was to use faster computers and automated radars, allowing many interceptors to be in flight simultaneously. Zeus was being developed just as digital computers were experiencing a massive improvement in performance. Radar systems were likewise introducing the first phased array radar (Passive electronically scanned array) systems. Combining the two would allow hundreds of warheads and interceptors to be tracked and controlled at once. As long as the interceptor missile was not significantly more expensive than the ICBM, which was likely given their relative sizes, overwhelming such a system would not be feasible in a weapons system.

Taking these factors into consideration, ARPA outlined four potential approaches to a new ABM system. The first was Nike Zeus in its current form. The second was Zeus combined with a new radar system. The third included new radars and computers. Finally, the fourth, or X, plan called for all of these changes, as well as a new short-range missile. As the shorter range missile would overlap with Zeus, X also called for Zeus to be modified for even greater range as "Zeus EX". After considerable debate, the decision was made to cancel the existing Zeus deployment and move ahead with the X plan.

=== Testing ===
The first test-launch of the Spartan, as the X plan came to be called, occurred at Kwajalein Missile Range on 30 March 1968.

== Survivors ==
- The Air Defense Artillery museum at Fort Sill, and Safeguard park at Fort Bliss, have Spartan missiles on display.

== Photo gallery ==
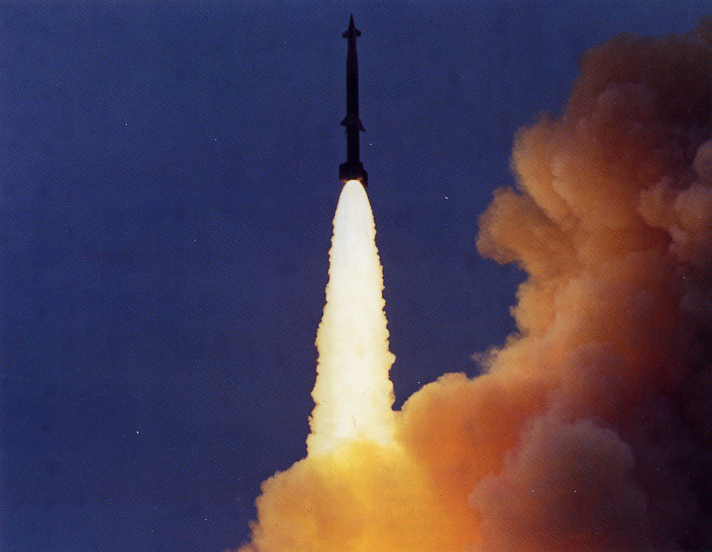

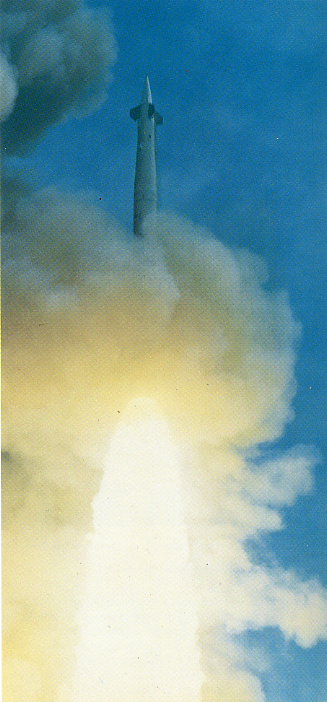

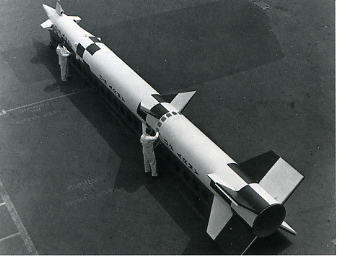

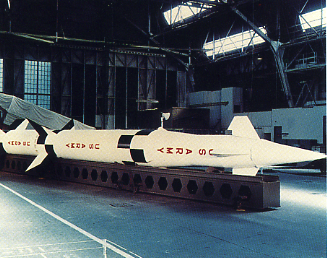

== See also ==
- Sprint (missile)
- Nike-Hercules missile
- Nike Zeus
- Missile Command (video game)

Related lists

- List of military aircraft of the United States
- List of missiles
- Comparison of anti-ballistic missile systems
