= Abertoir =

Welsh horror film festival

Abertoir: The International Horror Festival of Wales is an annual horror and horror film festival held in the Aberystwyth Arts Centre in Aberystwyth, Ceredigion, Wales.

== History ==
The festival began as a four-day event from 28th-31st October 2006, with a programme of ten feature films. This included a screening of cult horror film The Wicker Man with a talk from director Robin Hardy, as well as the British independent film Broken being screened alongside a Q&A featuring directors Adam Mason, Simon Boyes, and actress Nadja Brand.

In 2014, Abertoir collaborated with the Wales One World Film Festival (WOW) for the UK premiere of the Argentinian supernatural thriller The Second Death (La Segunda Muerte).

The most recent festival was held from 12th-16th November 2025, and included 20 feature films (including six UK premieres) and 30 short films, plus special guests including actress Lynn Lowry, and Garth Marenghi.

== Description ==
The festival screens new big-budget horror films, along with classics and independent films. It also includes a short film competition, screening entries from around the world. It often also features music concerts, stage productions and masterclasses.

Abertoir is a member of the European Fantastic Film Festivals Federation, and maintains a partnership with the Wales One World Film Festival.

== Notable guests ==
Notable guests of honour have included:

- Robin Hardy (2006 & 2010)
- Lloyd Kaufman (2007)
- Mark Gatiss (2008)
- Doug Bradley (2008 & 2009)
- Herschell Gordon Lewis (2009)
- Victoria Price (daughter of Vincent Price) (2011, 2015 & 2025)
- Catriona MacColl (2012)
- Richard Johnson (2013)
- Fabio Frizzi (2013, 2015, 2016 & 2024)
- Luigi Cozzi (2014 & 2016)
- Ian McCulloch (2014)
- Dario Russo and David Ashby (creators of Danger 5) (2015)
- Lynn Lowry (2016 & 2025)
- Sergio Martino (2017)
- Lamberto Bava (2017)
- Brian O'Malley (2017)
- Gary Sherman (2019 & 2023)
- John Scott (2019)
- Norman J. Warren (2019)
- Prano Bailey-Bond (2021)
- William Crain (2022)
- Robin Ince (2023 & 2024)
- Garth Marenghi (2025)

== Notable premieres ==
The following films were premiered at the festival before general release:

- All The Boys Love Mandy Lane (2007)
- Dead Wood (2007)
- Planet Terror (2007)
- Colin (2008)
- The Uh! Oh! Show (2009)
- Rare Exports (2010)

== Notable bands ==
Notable bands which have played at the film festival include:

- Daemonia (band of horror composer Claudio Simonetti) (2008)
- Zombina and the Skeletones (2009 and 2010)
- The Damned (2010)
- Devilish Presley (2011)
- Fabio Frizzi and the Frizzi 2 Fulci Band (2015, 2016)

== See also ==
- List of fantastic and horror film festivals
- FrightFest (film festival)
