= Wales One World Film Festival =

Film festival in Aberystwyth, Wales

- Location: Several venues in Wales, UK
- Established: 2001
- Founded by: David Gillam
- Artistic director: David Gillam
- Website: www.wowfilmfestival.com

Wales One World Film Festival (Welsh: Gŵyl Ffilm WOW "Cymru a’r Byd yn Un"), also known as WOW Film Festival, is an annual celebration of world cinema held in Wales. The festival presents a touring programme that travels to towns across the country, including Bangor, Swansea, Cardigan, Carmarthen, and Fishguard. Its full programme is showcased at its main venue and long-standing home, the Aberystwyth Arts Centre in Aberystwyth, Wales, UK.

Founded in 2001, WOW is the UK's longest-running festival dedicated to world cinema, with a focus on films from Africa, Asia, Latin America, and the Middle East.

== History ==
The Wales One World Film Festival was founded in 2001 by David Gillam, and in that year screened at three venues: Aberystwyth Arts Centre, the Taliesin in Swansea, and Chapter in Cardiff. His vision was to present world cinema in a way that "show[s] the stories people ‘over there’ are telling each other, what is important to them".

In 2014 the festival screened at Chapter Cardiff, Aberystwyth Arts Centre, Theatr Mwldan Cardigan, and Clwyd Theatr Cymru Mold. In that year, WOW collaborated with Aberystwyth's Abertoir (subtitled "The International Horror Festival of Wales") for the UK premiere of the Argentinian supernatural thriller The Second Death (La Segunda Muerte). Other films screened in that year included The Lunchbox ; Metro Manila from the Philippines; Delight (one of a trilogy by Welsh director Gareth Jones); Kenyan drama Nairobi Half Life; and the Swiss documentary Winter Nomads.

In 2015, the festival included films Argentinian film Natural Sciences (Ciencias naturales); the documentary Deep Listening, about Australian eco-communities; the international collaboration Jauja, starring Viggo Mortensen; and films from India, Ethiopia, Mauritania and Brazil There was also a day of Iranian films to celebrate Nowruz (Iranian new year, celebrated on the northern spring equinox).

In 2017, the festival opened on 17 March in Cardiff then toured to Aberystwyth, Swansea, Cardigan and Mold, screening films from Argentina, Chile, Colombia, Mali, Palestine, Thailand and Nepal. Films included Pablo Larrain's Neruda; documentary feature Tomorrow (Demain) (2015, Cyril Dion); feature documentary on the arms trade Shadow World; and many others.

The 20th edition in 2021 was presented online, owing to the COVID-19 pandemic. All films were presented free to view. Peter Wohlleben's film The Hidden Life of Trees had its UK premiere at the festival. Other films included Bhutan documentary Lunana: A Yak in the Classroom; feelgood comedy Arab Blues; Malaysian horror film Roh; and the 1974 Iranian classic The Deer. The festival concluded on 21 March, celebrating the International Day of Forests.

The 2022 event, which ran from 25 February to 13 March, was the 21st edition of the festival, making it the longest-running festival of world cinema in the UK. Over half the films were UK online premieres.

For its 22nd edition in March 2023, the festival toured Wales—visiting Aberystwyth, Oswestry, Swansea, and Fishguard—bringing together 16 international premieres, with a particular focus on Indigenous cinema, Ecosinema, and a special “Made in Bangladesh” strand.

The 23rd edition (March 11–28, 2024) featured a Wales-wide cinema tour including Bangor, Swansea, Cardigan, and Aberystwyth, alongside an online UK-wide audience. During this edition, Annita Nitsaidou, WOW's Marketing Officer and Programmer, assumed the role of Interim Festival Director, overseeing a diverse programme of global fiction, documentaries, Welsh and International shorts, Q&As, and the return of Ecosinema. For the first time, the festival was curated by an all-female programming team, marking a milestone in its commitment to inclusive leadership. This edition featured a collaboration with the Aberystwyth University's International Politics Department and that included the exhibition and screening of 7 projects realised with the support of the Creating Safer Space project, an international research and impact collaboration, which aims to understand and support unarmed civilian protection and self-protection amidst violent conflict.

In her first official year at the helm, Annita Nitsaidou led the 24th WOW Festival (21 March–4 April 2025), with key screenings in Bangor, Carmarthen, Fishguard, and Aberystwyth Arts Centre. Under her direction, the festival embraced an ambitious programme themed around “Peace, Trust, and Resilience”, spotlighting high-profile UK and Welsh premieres in its Ecosinema and “Made in Wales” strands, including feature fiction films from Palestinian female filmmakers such as the award-winning titles The Teacher by Farah Nabulsi and Thank You For Banking With Us by Laila Abbas.

== Description ==
The festival is supported by Ffilm Cymru Wales, the Film Hub Wales (as part of the BFI Film Audience Network (FAN), made possible by The National Lottery), the Arts Council of Wales. In 2021 the Festival was also supported by the Welsh Government's Cultural Recovery Fund while in 2025 it received the Jobs Protection and Resilience Fund from the Arts Council of Wales. It is dedicated to world cinema, screening films mostly from Africa, Asia and Latin America, aiming to show under-represented national cinema industries. Its specialised programming allows for "visionary cinema" to be screened in a way that regular circuits do not allow.

Until 2023, the Director of WOW was the Founder of the festival, David Gillam, who was also inaugural director of Borderlines Film Festival from 2003 to 2013. In 2023, David Gillam stepped down and joined the WOW Board and Annita Nitsaidou, formerly the Marketing Officer and one of WOW's Programmers, took over as Festival Director.

The Abertoir festival, Iris LGBT+, and Native Spirit Festival are partner festivals of WOW. A selection of short films made by Welsh emerging filmmakers, under the banner of Ffilm Ifanc, are premiered in a section called Made in Wales.

== Climate Stories ==
The Bangladesh Cymru Climate Stories film project is a collaborative project between Dhaka DocLab in Bangladesh, and Wales One World Film Festival, focused on making films about climate change. The British Council is funding the project to the tune of £74,995. Four short films "on the theme of women building sustainability and resilience in response to climate change issues" will be selected from entries by filmmakers aged 18–35, two each from Bangladesh and Wales. The winning entries will be shown at the 2023 WOW Film Festival.
