= Gareth Jones (director) =

British film and television director and screenwriter

Gareth Jones is a British film and television director and screenwriter. He is the owner and joint CEO, with Fiona Howe, of the independent production company Scenario Films.

== Early life and education ==
Gareth Jones was born in London, son of the BBC Foreign Correspondent Ivor Jones and Jane Ann Sterndale Bennett. He is the grandson of the actress Athene Seyler and great-great-grandson of the composer William Sterndale Bennett.

He was educated at Westminster School and St John's College, Cambridge where he read modern languages. After graduation in 1973, he trained for a year at the Guildhall School of Music and Drama.

In 2011 he was awarded his PhD from Cambridge University for his thesis Rites of Recuperation: Film and the Holocaust in Germany and the Balkans.

== Career ==
=== 1970s–1980s ===
Jones first joined Prospect Theatre Company, where he worked with Kenny McBain, directing Shakespeare, Brecht, Strindberg, and Chekhov.

He was director of productions at the bilingual Welsh/English touring company Theatr yr Ymylon. Between 1977 and 1980, he worked as a freelance theatre director for the Royal Court Theatre with Stuart Burge, and for Theatr Clwyd, where he directed his own plays My People (based on the short stories of Caradoc Evans) and Solidarity During the 1980s he published two novels, Lord of Misrule and Noble Savage.

After training as a television director at HTV Wales, he joined Granada Television at the invitation of producer Bill Podmore. There, he directed Coronation Street and the comedy drama series Brass, starring Timothy West, Caroline Blakiston and Barbara Ewing, the second series of which he also produced.

From 1984 to 1987, he worked as a freelance writer/director for BBC television drama. He wrote the series Fighting Back, starring Hazel O'Connor, and the five-part drama Shalom Salaam, a Jewish-Muslim love story starring Mamta Kaash, Toby Rolt, Ayub Khan-Din and Charlotte Cornwell, which he also directed.

Jones' other television directing credits include The Trial of Klaus Barbie (1987), which was based on court transcripts and screened shortly after the verdict of the Gestapo leader's trial; Watch with Mother and Seeing in the Dark for BBC Drama; and Seduction – Tell Me More for Channel 4, for which he also shot and co-wrote the three-part documentary Born of the One Father (Au Nom du Même Père) in 1980–81.

=== 1990s–present ===
Jones has worked as a screenwriter in Europe, where his credits include television movies such as Forbidden Zone (Verbotene Zone, 1995) and Not Without You (Nicht Ohne Dich, 2001) for German broadcaster ZDF, The Gift of Life (Un Cadeau: la Vie) for France 2, Joseph, Mary Magdalen, Thomas and Saul of Tarsus for Mediaset in Italy, and the award-winning feature film Bonhoeffer: Agent of Grace (2000), starring Ulrich Tukur.

Since 2007, he has run the feature film development initiative Babylon. This aims to promote cultural diversity within the independent film sector in Europe, and to provide an international platform for emerging filmmakers.

Jones wrote and directed a trilogy of feature films known collectively as the D-Trilogy, Desire (2009), Delight (2013) and Delirium (2016). Delight was screened at the 35th Moscow International Film Festival and at the Wales One World Film Festival.

== Awards and nominations ==
| Year | Award | Category | Title | Result |
|---|---|---|---|---|
| 1983 | British Press Guild Award | Best Light Entertainment | Brass | Won |
| 1989 | FIPA, Cannes | Best Actress | Shalom Salaam | Won |
| 1989 | FIPA, Cannes, SACD Award | Best Screenplay | Shalom Salaam | Won |
| 2000 | 40th International TV Festival Monte Carlo | Nymphe d'Or | Bonhoeffer: Agent of Grace | Won |
| 2000 | DAG Writer's Award, Germany | Gold Medal, Most Challenging German Film | Bonhoeffer: Agent of Grace | Won |
| 2000 | New York Festival | Bronze World Medal | Bonhoeffer: Agent of Grace | Won |
| 2009 | 17th Raindance Film Festival 2009 | Best UK Feature | Desire | Nominated |
| 2013 | German Script Prize 2013 | Best Script | A Slice of Sea | Nominated |
| 2013 | 35th Moscow Film Festival 2013 | Golden St George, Best Film | Delight | Nominated |

== Filmography ==
| Year(s) | Title | Role | Channel/Distributor | Duration |
|---|---|---|---|---|
| 1980 | Crown Court | Writer | Granada Television | 3 x 30 mins |
| 1981 | Coronation Street | Director | Granada Television | 14 x 30 mins |
| 1983 | Brass (Series 1) | Director | Granada Television | 13 x 25 mins |
| 1984 | Brass (Series 2) | Producer/Director | Granada Television | 13 x 25 mins |
| 1985 | Albion Market (Pilot) | Director | Granada Television | 2 x 30 mins |
| 1985-6 | Albion Market | Producer | Granada Television | 70 x 30 mins |
| 1986 | Fighting Back | Writer | BBC Television | 5 x 60 mins |
| 1987 | The Trial of Klaus Barbie | Director | BBC Television | 1 x 90 mins |
| 1988 | Shalom Salaam | Writer/Director | BBC Television | 5 x 60 mins |
| 1988 | Watch with Mother | Director | BBC Television | 1 x 75 mins |
| 1989 | Seeing in the Dark | Director | BBC Television | 1 x 75 mins |
| 1990 | Seduction: Tell Me More | Director | Channel 4 | 1 x 20 mins |
| 1991 | Born of the One Father (Au Nom du Même Père) | Director | Channel 4/TF1 | 3 x 50 mins |
| 1994 | Forbidden Zone (Verbotene Zone) | Co-Writer | ZDF/ARTE | 1 x 90 mins |
| 1995-6 | Open Sundays (Sonntags Geöffnet) | Co-Writer | RTL | 13 x 50 mins |
| 1999 | The Gift of Life (Un Cadeau la Vie) | Co-Writer | France 2 | 1 x 90 mins |
| 1999 | Joseph (Giuseppe) | Writer | Mediaset | 1 x 90 mins |
| 2000 | St Paul (San Paolo) | Writer | Mediaset | 2 x 90 mins |
| 2000 | Mary Magdalene (Maria Maddalena) | Writer | Mediaset | 1 x 90 mins |
| 2000 | Bonhoeffer: Agent of Grace (Bonhoeffer – Die letzte Stufe) | Writer | ARD/Theatrical | 1 x 90 mins |
| 2001 | Thomas (Tommaso) | Writer | Mediaset | 1 x 90 mins |
| 2001 | Not Without You (Nicht Ohne Dich) | Co-Writer | ZDF | 1 x 90 mins |
| 2009 | Desire | Writer/Director | Scenario Films/Theatrical | 1 x 90 mins |
| 2013 | Delight | Writer/Director | Scenario Films/Theatrical | 1 x 100 mins |
| 2016 | Delirium | Writer/Director | Scenario Films/Theatrical | 1 x 100 mins |

== Theatre and radio ==
| Year | Title | Role | Venue/Broadcaster | Description |
|---|---|---|---|---|
| 1980 | My People | Writer/Adaptor/Director | Theatr Clwyd/Tour | Theatre Play |
| 1981 | Solidarity | Writer/Director | Theatr Clwyd | Theatre Play |
| 1981 | Solidarity | Writer | BBC Radio 3 | Theatre Play |
| 1981 | Lord of Misrule | Writer/Novel | BBC Radio 4 | 9-part Dramatization |
| 1982 | The Drovers' Roads | Writer/Director/Presenter | BBC Wales | Radio Documentary |
| 1982 | Night Must Fall | Director | Theatr Clwyd | Theatre Play |

== Selected publications ==
| Year | Title | Role | Publisher | Description |
|---|---|---|---|---|
| 1980 | Lord of Misrule(aka The Disinherited) | Author | Farrar, Straus & Giroux US/Gollancz/Penguin UK | Novel |
| 1985 | Noble Savage | Author | Weidenfeld & Nicolson/Sphere UK | Novel |
| 2006 | The Optimists | Author | Kinokultura, November 2006, ed Iordanova | Film Criticism/Academic |
| 2006 | Sarajevo – Trauma Revisited | Author | Beyond Camps and Forced Labour, ed Steinert and Weber-Newth (Osnabrück: Secolo, 2007) | Film Criticism/Academic |
| 2007 | The Cinema of the Balkans | Author | Historical Journal of Film, Radio and Television, Vol 27, Issue 2 | Film Criticism/Academic |
| 2007 | An Inner Exodus: The Many Diasporas of Balkan Cinema | Author | Cineaste, Vol XXXII, No 3 | Film Criticism/Academic |
| 2010 | Future Imperfect; European Cinema in Motion: Migrant and Diasporic Film in Contemporary Europe ed. Berghahn and Sternberg | Author | Palgrave Macmillan, 2010 | Film Criticism/Academic |
