= Aberystwyth Arts Centre =

Arts centre in Aberystwyth, Wales

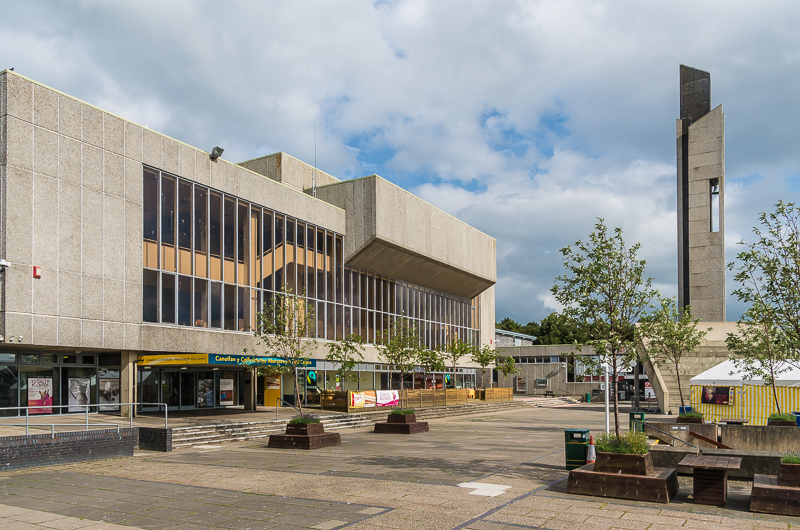

- Location within Ceredigion
- Established: 1970
- Location: Aberystwyth, Ceredigion, Wales
- Coordinates: 52.416628°N 4.062498°W
- Type: Arts centre
- Architects: Great Hall – Dale Owen of Percy Thomas Partnership; Redevelopment – Peter Roberts; Studio complex – Thomas Heatherwick
- Website: Aberystwyth Arts Centre

Aberystwyth Arts Centre (Welsh: Canolfan y Celfyddydau Aberystwyth) is an arts centre in Wales, located on Aberystwyth University's Penglais campus. One of the largest in Wales, it comprises a theatre (312 seats), concert hall (1,250 seats), studio (80 seats) and cinema (125 seats), as well as four gallery spaces and cafés, bars, and shops.

For picture credit and similar purposes, it calls itself the Aberystwyth University School of Art Museum and Galleries.

== History ==
=== Foundation and early years ===
The University College of Wales, Aberystwyth began building Aberystwyth Arts Centre on its Penglais campus in the 1960s to serve the College, the town of Aberystwyth, and the surrounding counties.

The first phase was the concert hall (the Great Hall), which opened in 1970. Designed by architect Dale Owen of the Percy Thomas Partnership, the building was awarded the RIBA Gold Medal for Architecture in Wales. The hall also received the Gold Medal for Architecture at the National Eisteddfod of Wales of 1971. The second and final phase was the theatre ('Theatr y Werin', literally ‘theatre of the people’), completed in autumn 1972.

From the outset the Arts Centre pursued a diverse programming policy, supporting local groups and University ensembles as well as inviting leading professional companies. The project receives ongoing support from the University, the Arts Council of Wales, and the West Wales Association for the Arts.

The first manager, Roger Tomlinson, ran the venue from the planning phases through to 1975, when he left for a similar role with Theatr Clwyd in North Wales. His programming at Aberystwyth introduced productions that featured well-known names from film and television, such as Pete Postlethwaite and Julie Walters.

Ken Williams, an ex-RAF Wing Commander who had been Tomlinson's Administrator, took over as Manager in 1975. A classical music aficionado, he nurtured the concert programming and helped establish the musical productions whose successors still feature in the Centre's summer programmes. Michael Ball's professional debut was in the Centre's 1985 production of Godspell.

The Visual Arts and Exhibitions Programme was substantially expanded with Arts Council of Wales funding after Alan Hewson was appointed Exhibitions Officer in 1978. He went on to established the Arts Centre Café in 1980, the Bookshop in 1981, the Arts Centre film programme in 1983 and the Visual Arts Education Programme which was the first of the Centre's community arts and education programmes.

=== 1984-2013: the Alan Hewson years ===
Alan Hewson was appointed Director in 1984. Changing policy in 1985, the Arts Council of Wales withdrew funding from many theatres and arts centres in Wales and focused on producing theatre companies instead. The University still received core support, but alternative funding was needed for the artistic programme and the development of the Centre.

Three key strategies were devised: firstly, innovative partnerships for the artistic programming; secondly development of links to the community through a growing community arts programme aimed to be as self-financing as possible; and thirdly substantial expansion of the Arts Centre's earned income by developing its commercial operations.

Festivals were seen as a way to develop the artistic programme and attract interested and committed audiences locally, nationally, and internationally. The Musicfest International Music Festival and Summer School were established in 1986, building on links with the University Music Department. The festival now stages more than 30 annual concerts and events, and some 100 young musicians from the UK and abroad attend the Summer School.

The International Ceramics Festival, established in 1987 when the Arts Centre joined forces with North and South Wales Potters Associations, now attracts over 1,000 potters and ceramicists from around the world. The University already had a collection of twentieth-century studio ceramics, and the Festival originally linked to it through associated exhibitions and a growing range of ceramics courses.

Over the next twenty years the Arts Centre established, and helped establish, twelve more festivals whose themes included children's literature, poetry, theatre for young people, international theatre, student media, digital storytelling, world music, world cinema, classic cinema, and horror films. The most recent festivals were Wales's major photography festival, the Eye, established in 2011. and the Wales Festival of Architecture launched in 2013. These festival, set up in partnership with organisations and individuals, have become key programming elements that also help support the work of the University departments.

The Community Arts and Education Programme which began in 1984 has grown to cover most art forms, and earns a significant part of its own funding. Commercial development, the third strand of the Centre's strategy for growth and sustainability, was helped by European funding in 1993 and Lottery funding in 2000.

Through the 1980s and 1990s, the Centre established workshops, studios, cafés, shops and bars, drawing on minimal resources to meet demand and help fund the artistic programme.

£2.6 million from the Arts Council of Wales Lottery Scheme part-funded a major redevelopment project which, after four years of planning and two of construction, opened to the public in April 2000. At a total cost of £4.3 million the Royal Institute of British Architects' award-winning project, designed by architect Peter Roberts, added a major new gallery, ceramic and 2D workshop spaces, a cinema, studio theatre, recording studio, four dance studios, a photographic suite and digilab, as well as substantially expanding the theatre foyer.

A £1.25 million project to add a studio complex for artists and creative industries was completed in spring 2009. Designed by Thomas Heatherwick, the complex received a Royal Institute of British Architects Award, plus the only Civic Trust Award granted in Wales in 2010.

The Creative Units host the Centre's Artists in Residence Programme for UK and international visual artists, funded by trusts, foundations, and cultural organisations in Finland, Canada, Australia and Pakistan. Additional units, funded by the Arts Council of Wales and the National Assembly for Wales, were completed in August 2011.

Alan Hewson left in 2013 after 28 years as Arts Centre Director.

=== From 2013 ===
The Arts Centre closed in March 2020 and reopened in July 2021 after both the Covid-19 pandemic and refurbishment necessary due to extreme weather damage. The tenure of Dafydd Rhys as Director, which ended in December 2022, saw the Arts Centre return to its pole position for the arts in West Wales.

In summer 2021 every wall- galleries and lobbies alike- was given over to a unique exhibition of art that had been made during the periods of lockdown. 550 art-works of all media were displayed by 148 artists.

In the summer of 2022 the National Eisteddfod returned and took place in Tregaron. The Arts Centre presented two connected events. A retrospective of the art of Ogwyn Davies was shown in the main gallery. "Operation Julie", a co-production with Theatr na nÓg, played to acclaim in Theatr y Werin.

In February 2023 the appointment of David Wilson as director was announced.

In 2024, the Great Hall was listed as grade-II* and the bell tower and Hugh Owen Building were listed as grade-II. All three buildings had previously won architectural awards: the Great Hall and the Hugh Owen Building received RIBA awards, in 1972 and 1977 respectively, while the bell tower won a RIBA Gold Medal in 1972.

== Finances ==
The Arts Centre's turnover is almost £3.5m, of which ticket sales and commercial trading operations (e.g. cafés, bars, shops and conferences) account for 78%. 45% is average for most comparable arts facilities in the UK. It currently receives core funding from the University, Arts Council of Wales and Ceredigion County Council. From having received no Arts Council of Wales funding in 1986, the Arts Centre has become a major revenue client receiving over £500,000 a year. Almost £3 million has been received over the last ten years for capital projects.

== Venues ==
=== Theatre ===
The 312-seat theatre's programme mixes professional and community productions. In-house productions are also taken on tour. The programme includes a range of theatre, dance and music events, with a family show at Christmas and a traditional pantomime. The summer season production runs for five weeks in July and August.

The Arts Centre has an active youth theatre programme with members who have continued to professional careers in the performing arts. Taron Egerton and Gwyneth Keyworth both went on to win places to study at RADA. They performed together in a production of Little Shop of Horrors in 2007.

=== Studio ===
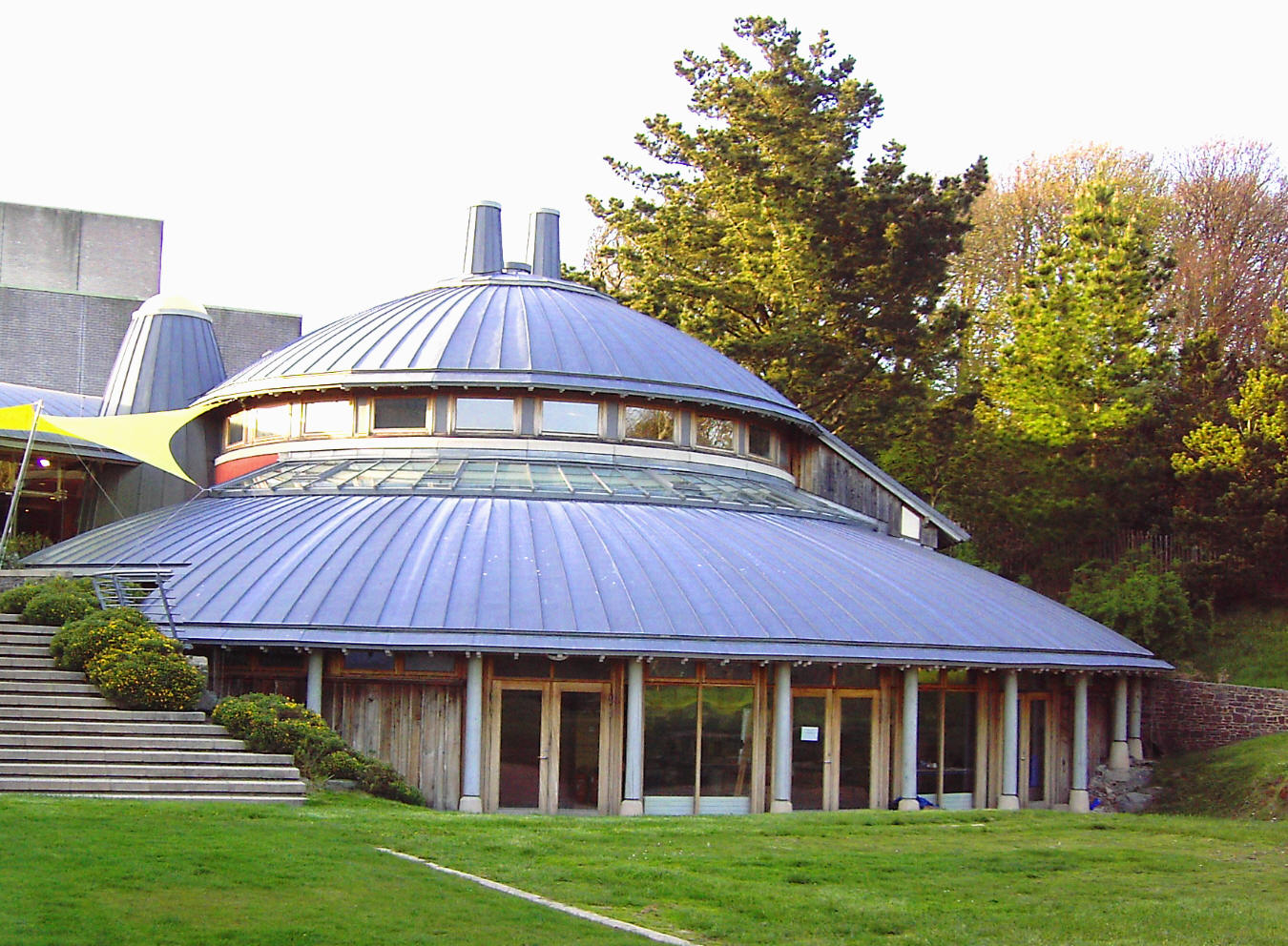
The Studio.

Seating up to 80 people, the Studio offers a more intimate space for new and experimental work and literature readings.

=== Concert Hall ===
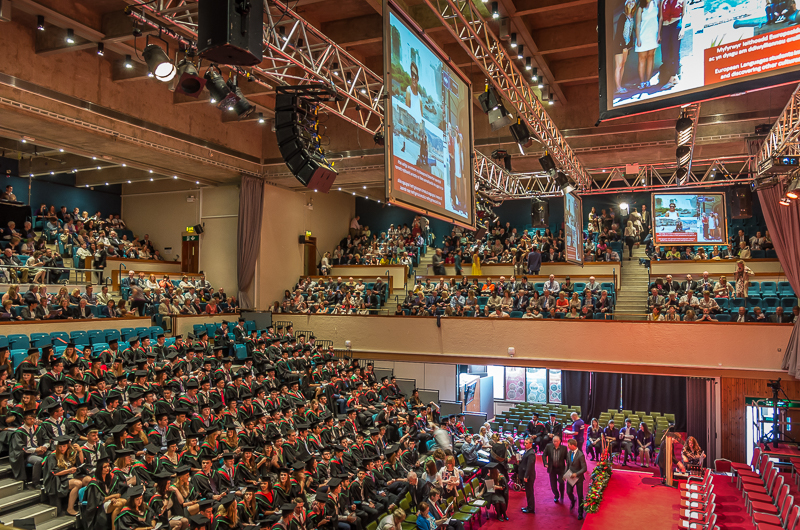
The Great Hall during Graduation Week 2015

Music concerts, theatre productions, light entertainment, and University events including Graduation Ceremonies are staged in the 1250-seat hall. The space can also accommodate trade shows, conferences, weddings and other special events.

=== Cinema ===
The 112-seat cinema shows at least two films each day, plus "Silver Screenings", "Parent and Baby" screenings, and Film Society and Cult Film Series screenings. The theatre provides live showings from the New York Metropolitan Opera, Bolshoi Ballet and National Theatre, and hosts festivals including the Abertoir festival and the Wales One World Film Festival.

=== Galleries ===
Gallery 1, the main exhibition space, showcases contemporary art including painting, sculpture, installations, and new media art. Gallery 2 focuses on print and photography. The Ceramics Gallery exhibits contemporary ceramics from around the world and also houses the Aberystwyth University Ceramics Collection. The Café Gallery shows relatively small-scale work in an informal setting. Also 'The Eye' is a mini-viewing space for artists' films.

=== Workshop spaces ===
Workshop spaces for the Community Arts programme include four dance studios, a ceramic studio, 3D studio, and 2D studio, two rehearsal spaces, a recording studio, and a photographic suite and digilab.

=== Cafés and bars ===
The centre features three hospitality outlets, the Café which incorporates the Café Gallery, the Piazza Café on the external plaza, and the Theatre Bar adjacent to Theatr Y Werin.

=== Shops ===
The Craft and Design shop sells contemporary crafts and jewellery, particularly work from Wales. It also stages a Craft Fair during November and December, where the stalls sell Welsh-made work. The bookshop sells works that include academic publications, and hosts book launches and literary events.

== Statistics ==
The arts centre received over 650,000 visitors a year before the pandemic to over 700 scheduled events, including 100,000 to the community arts and education programme, according to the latest published annual report. With a turnover of approximately £3.5 million the Arts Centre is recognised as one of the most successful centres for the arts in Wales.
