= Dale Owen =

Welsh architect (1924–1997)

- Born: Ivan Dale Owen; 2 August 1924; Merthyr Tydfil, Wales
- Died: 12 November 1997 (aged 73); Penarth, Wales
- Citizenship: British
- Education: Cardiff University; Massachusetts Institute of Technology; Harvard University; The Bartlett
- Occupation: Architect
- Spouse: Maureen Kelly (m. 1964)
- Children: 3
- Awards: RIBA Gold Medal for Architecture in Wales for the Aberystwyth Arts Centre; Awarded Grade II listed status for the main building of St Fagans National Museum of History.
- Practice: Percy Thomas Partnership (1958–1989); Dale Owen Design, Architecture & Planning (1989–1997)
- Buildings: BBC Broadcasting House, Cardiff; The Great Hall, Aberystwyth Arts Centre
- Projects: Cardiff University, Swansea University and Aberystwyth University

Ivan Dale Owen (2 August 1924 – 12 November 1997) was a Welsh architect in the modernist architectural style. The Glamorgan Archives and The Independent newspaper both described him as a 'leading figure in Welsh architecture'. He was a partner in the Percy Thomas Partnership before setting up his own architectural practice with his wife in Penarth in 1989. Among Owen's designs were BBC Broadcasting House, Cardiff, the entrance building and galleries of St Fagans National Museum of History, Cardiff, plus major developments at Cardiff University, Swansea University and Aberystwyth University.

== Early life and education ==
He attended Whitchurch Grammar School in Cardiff, and in 1942 he went on to the Welsh School of Architecture. He served in the Royal Artillery between 1943 and 1946 and was commissioned as a lieutenant in June 1945. His war service took him to the North-West Frontier of India.

After completing his professional training in Cardiff and at The Bartlett School of Planning in University College London, he went on to work in London and then for the Newport Borough Council Architects' Department and the Cwmbran Development Corporation. In 1954, he won a Fulbright scholarship to study at the Massachusetts Institute of Technology, School of Architecture and Planning and Harvard Graduate School of Design as a research scholar.

== Professional career ==
"Gropius presented the modern movement not as a style but as a completely new approach to architecture which took full account of technical, economic and social conditions of life"

— Dale Owen

He then spent over a year working for Walter Gropius's practice, The Architects Collaborative, in Cambridge, Massachusetts. He returned to Britain, where he became a senior architect/planner with William Holford & Partners in London, where he worked on plans for the reconstruction of London after the war. He returned to Wales with health problems and in 1958 was hired by Percy Thomas & Son as an associate in their Cardiff office. By 1964, Percy Thomas & Son had become Sir Percy Thomas & Partners and Owen had become a partner. He changed the philosophy of the practice, transforming it with a contemporary modernist style. Between 1977 and 1979 he was the President of the Royal Society of Architects in Wales In 1982, he served as High Sheriff of South Glamorgan, and he also served as Deputy Lieutenant of South Glamorgan. He retired from Percy Thomas Partnership in 1989.

=== After retirement from Percy Thomas Partnership ===
In 1989 he established his own architectural practice, Dale Owen Design, Architecture & Planning. In 1991, he became director of Cymric Building Preservation Trust until his death in 1997. Owen also sat on the RIBA (Royal Institute of British Architects) Council. He was also involved in the Civic Trust for Wales

=== Selected works ===
- Cardiff University, Masterplan (1960)
- Swansea University, Halls of Residence (1960-8)
- Swansea University, School of Social Studies (1961-2)
- Cardiff University, Ty Gwyn halls of residence (1961-7)
- Swansea University, Library extension (1963-4)
- BBC Broadcasting House, Cardiff (1963-7)
- Aberystwyth University, Development plan (1965)
- Aberystwyth University, Great Hall & bell-tower (1967–70)
- Aberystwyth University, Cwrt Mawr halls of residence (1967–70)
- St Fagans National Museum of History, Cardiff, entrance building and galleries (1968–74)
- Portcullis House, Cardiff (1970-3)
- Aberystwyth University, Students Union (1971)
- St. Nicholas, Dyffryn_House, staff houses (1971)
- Cwmbran, Cwmbran Sports Centre (1972-3)
- Aberystwyth University, library and Hugh Owen building (1972-6)
- Aberystwyth University, Brynamlwg (staff sports and social club) (1974)
- Aberystwyth University, Development plan (second stage) (1984)
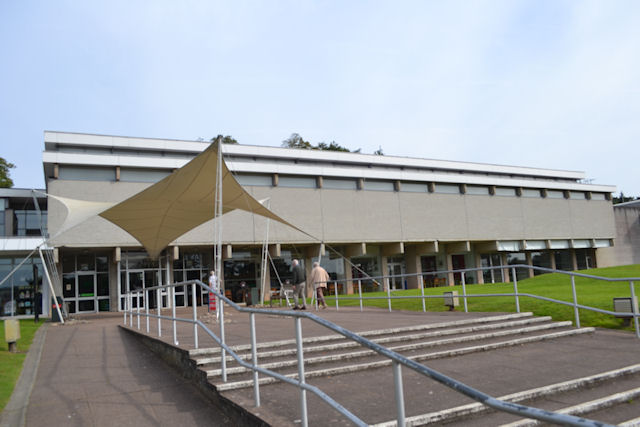
Entrance hall to St Fagans Museum

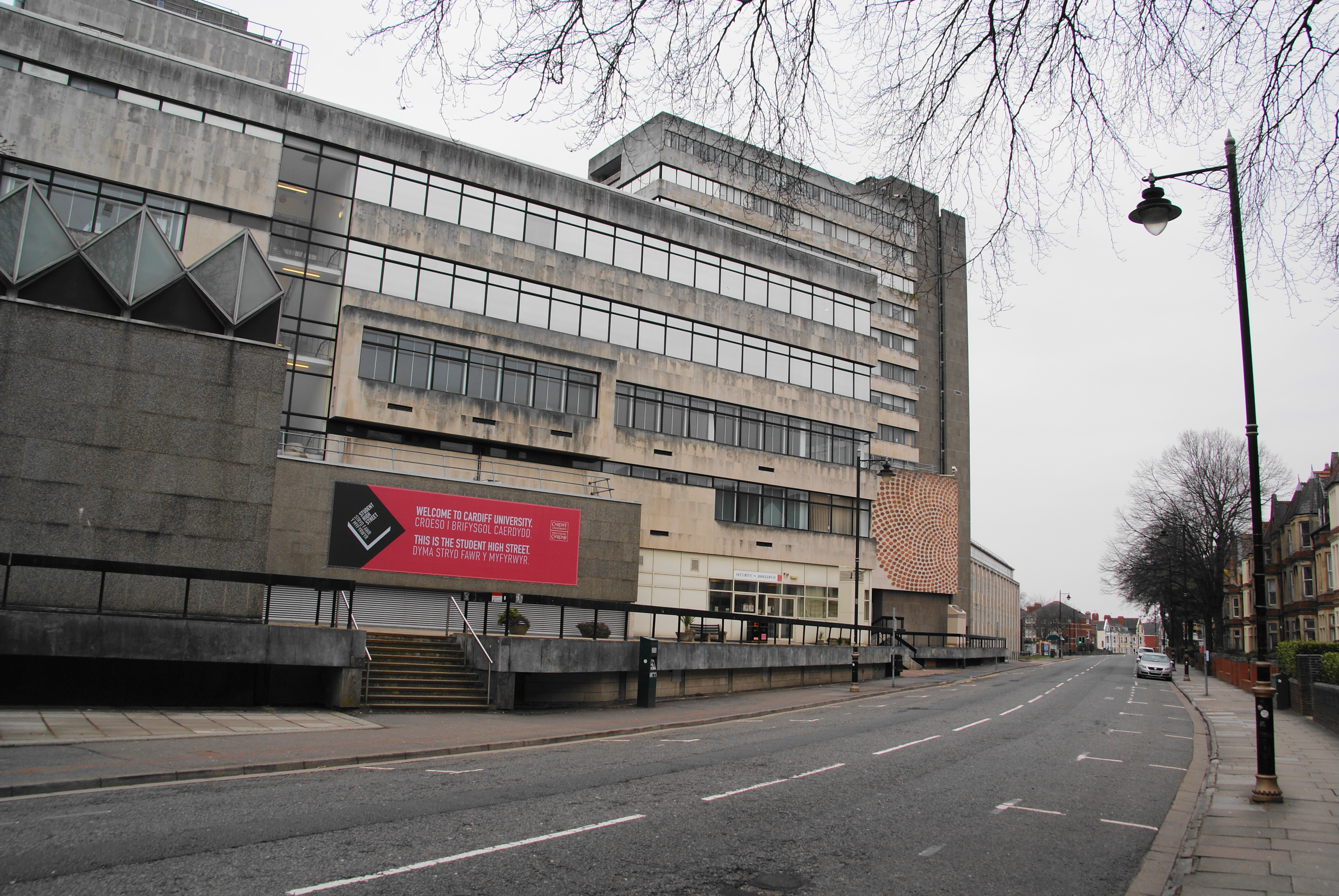
Sir Martin Evans (Biosciences) and Tower Building, Cardiff University

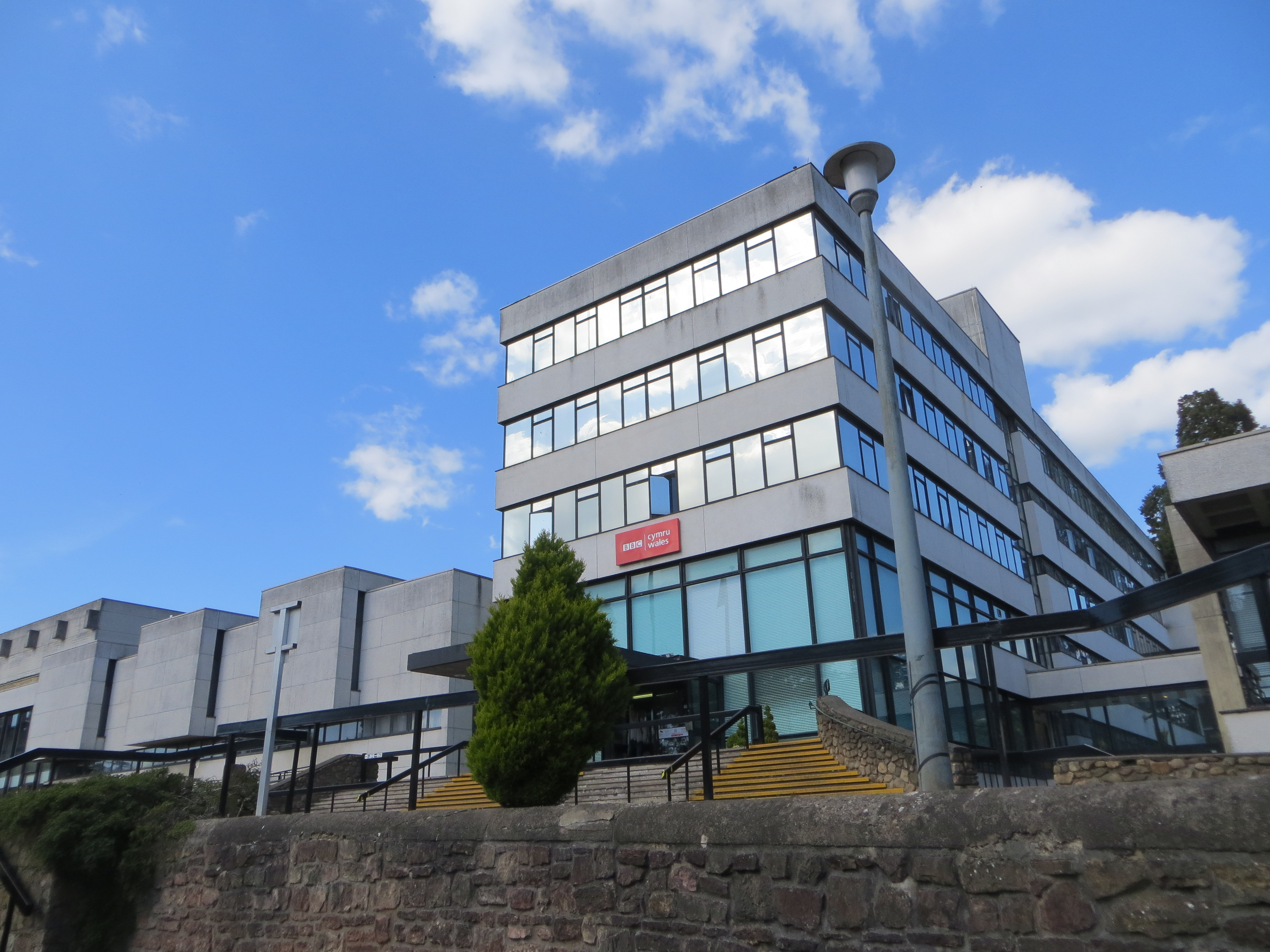
The former BBC Broadcasting House, Cardiff

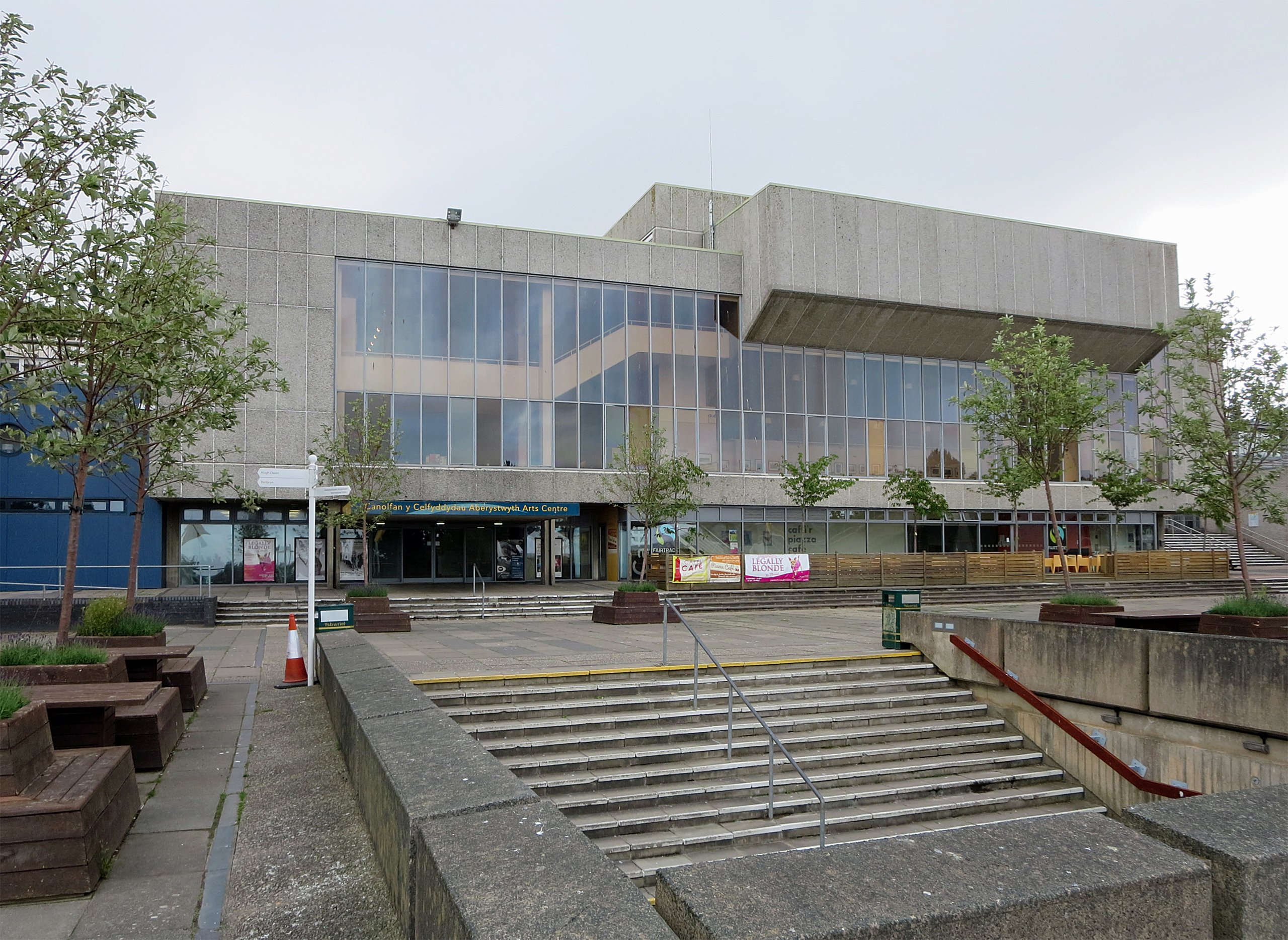
The Great Hall, Aberystwyth Arts Centre, Aberystwyth University. This is a Grade II* Listed building.

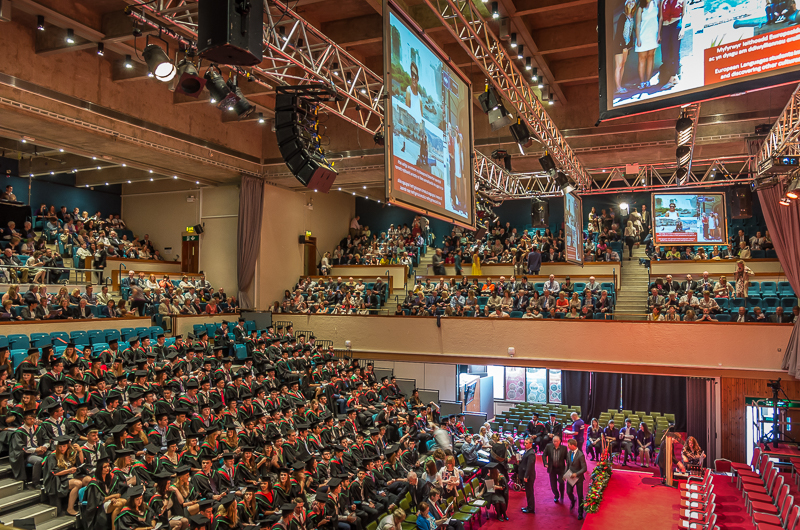
Inside the Great Hall, Aberystwyth Arts Centre, Aberystwyth University.

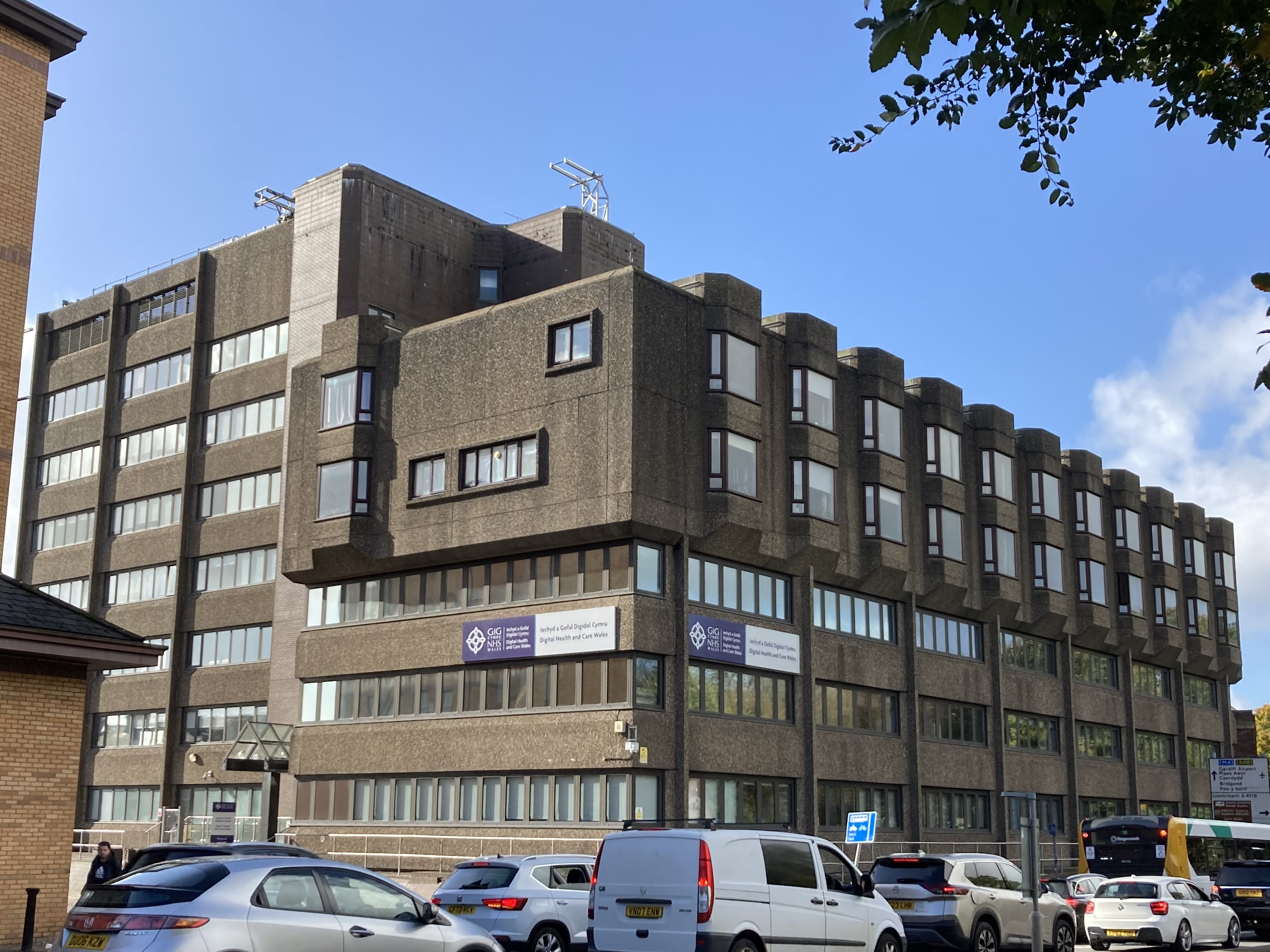
Portcullis House (now known as Tŷ Glan-yr-Afon) and Belgrave Court, Cowbridge Road East, Cardiff

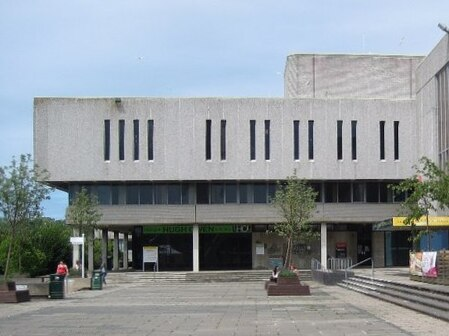
Hugh Owen Building, Aberystwyth University. This is a Grade II Listed building.

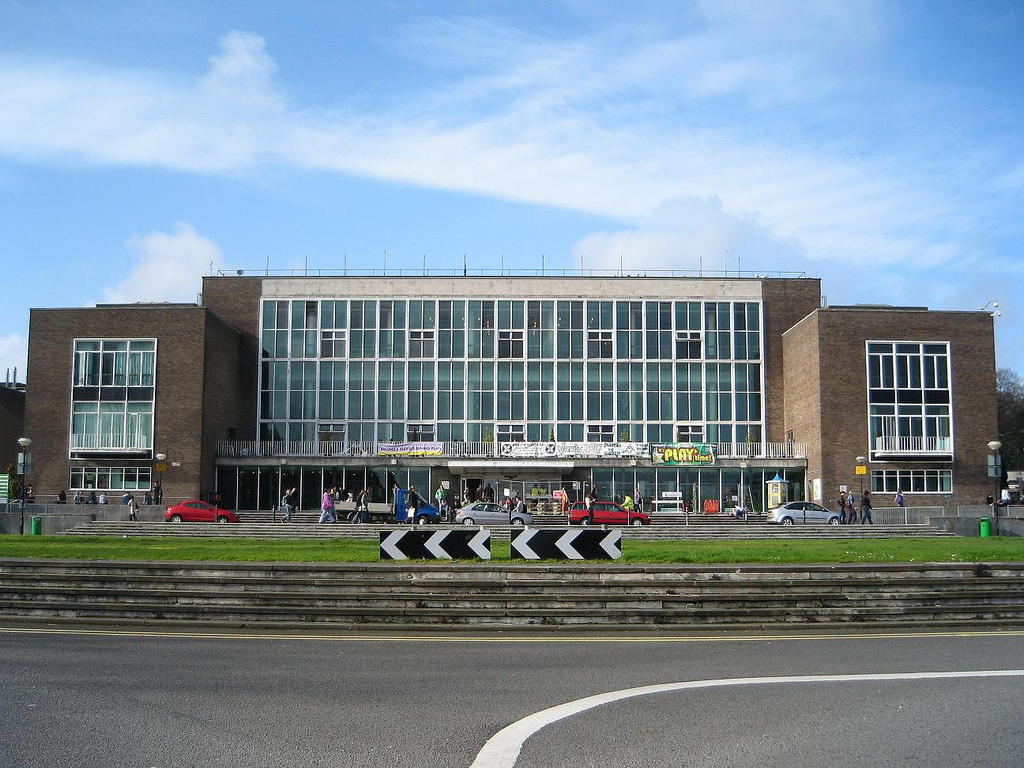
College House (now known as Fulton House), Swansea University. This is a Grade II Listed building.

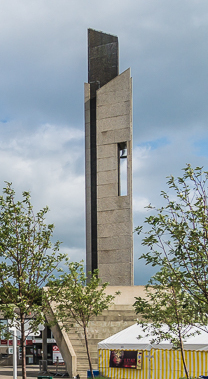
The Bell Tower, Aberystwyth University. This is a Grade II Listed building.

== Personal life ==
In 1964, Owen married Maureen Kelly. They had three sons Jason (who died aged 5, on 17 January 1984), Justin and Julian. Dale Owen died in Penarth on 12 November 1997, aged 73. His widow Maureen died on 29 August 2019, aged 84.

There is a memorial window to Owen and to his son who died in infancy in All Saints Church, Penarth. The window includes a depiction of Owen's design for the bell tower and Great Hall of Aberystwyth University, in which it signifies the Heavenly City.
