= Peter Wohlleben =

German forester and author (born 1964)

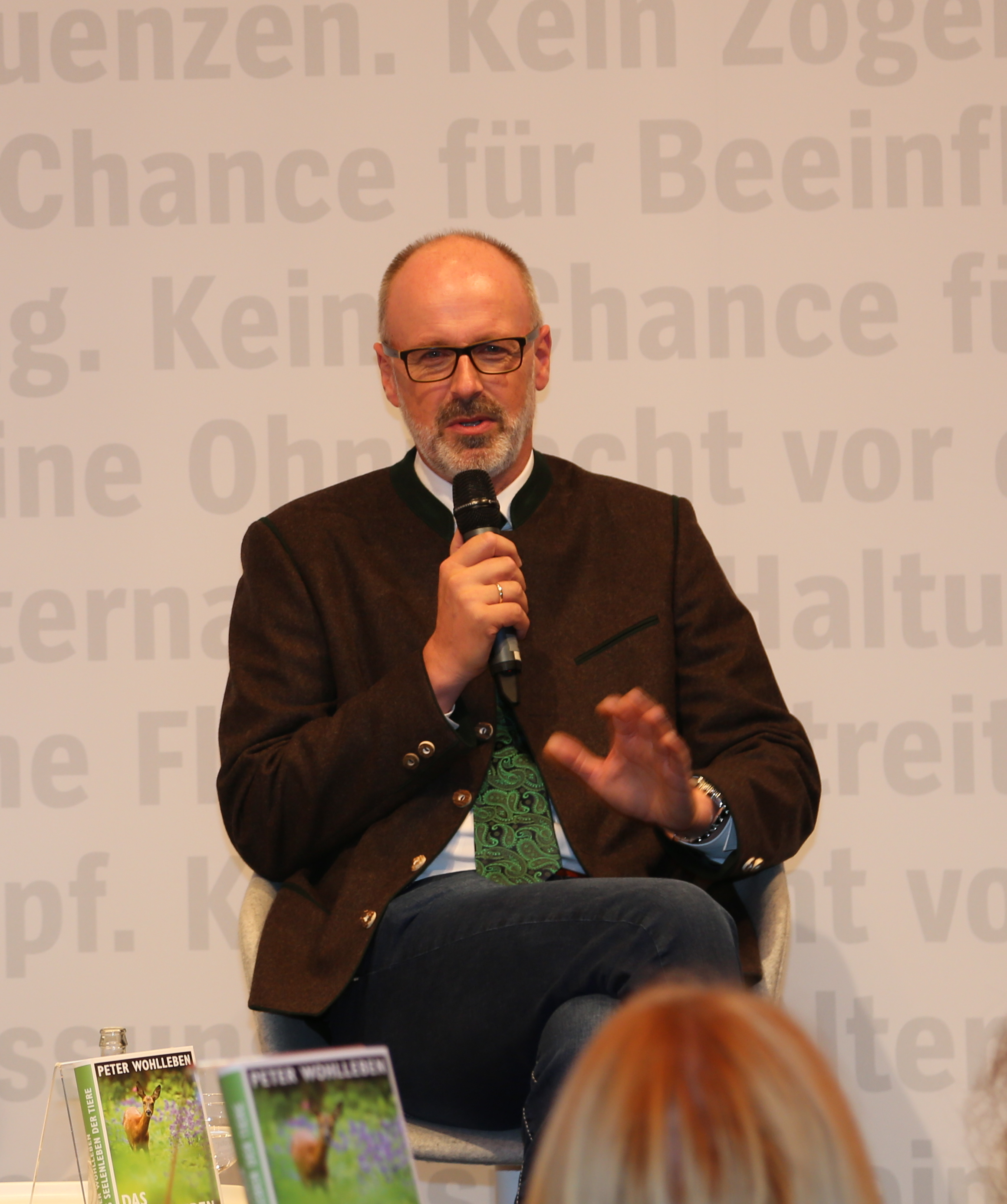
- Wohlleben in 2012
- Born: Bonn, West Germany
- Occupations: Forester, author
- Notable work: The Hidden Life of Trees; The Inner Life of Animals; The Secret Wisdom of Nature; Can You Hear the Trees Talking?

Peter Wohlleben (born 1964) is a German forester and author who writes on ecological themes in popular language and has controversially argued for plant sentience. He is the author of The Hidden Life of Trees: What They Feel, How They Communicate, which was translated from German into English in 2016. It was on the New York Times Best Seller list.

== Background ==
After graduation from forestry school in Rottenburg am Neckar, Germany, he took up a job as a government wood ranger in the Rhineland-Palatinate in 1987. As he grew more familiar with the woodlands he was overseeing, he became disenchanted due to the damage caused by the techniques and technologies he was expected to employ, including the felling of mature trees and the use of insecticides.

Professionally, Wohlleben manages a beech forest on behalf of the municipality of Hümmel, Germany. He offers regular forest tours at his forest academy.

While Wohlleben advocates for animal welfare and has raised awareness about the treatment of animals, and has stated that "It's okay to eat plants. It's okay to eat meat, although I'm a vegetarian, because meat is the main forest killer. But if plants are conscious about what they are doing, it's okay to eat them. Because otherwise we will die. And it's our right to survive.”, he has also controversially argued that plants feel pain.

== Writing career ==
Wohlleben began publishing books popularizing scientific research about ecology and forest management in 2007. The appearance of his The Hidden Life of Trees through Random House's Ludwig imprint led to profiles and reviews in all the major German newspapers, including skeptical pieces in the business press. The book was featured in a cover story in Der Spiegel and appeared on the Spiegel bestseller list.

His 2012 book Kranichflug und Blumenuhr, was translated as The Weather Detective: Rediscovering Nature's Secret Signs in 2018. The Secret Wisdom of Nature: Trees, Animals, and the Extraordinary Balance of All Living Things – Stories from Science and Observation was released in 2019. Wohlleben's first book for children available in English was published in October 2019. Called Can You Hear the Trees Talking?: Discovering The Hidden Life of Forests, it is a young readers' edition of The Hidden Life of Trees.

=== The Hidden Life of Trees ===
His 2015 book about natural forests, The Hidden Life of Trees (German: Das geheime Leben der Bäume:Was sie fühlen, wie sie kommunizieren – die Entdeckung einer verborgenen Welt), (The Hidden Life of Trees: What they Feel, How they Communicate: Discoveries from a Secret World) introduces readers to the world of trees, including Wood-Wide Web, through which nutrition and signals are exchanged among trees. An English translation was published in September 2016 under the title The Hidden Life of Trees: What they Feel, How they Communicate with a foreword by Australian environmentalist Tim Flannery, published by Greystone Books in partnership with the David Suzuki Institute. It cites the research of Suzanne Simard. The book was criticized by some biologists and professional foresters for using strong anthropomorphic and teleological language such as describing trees as having friendships and registering fear, love and pain.

A documentary film Intelligent Trees features several of Wohlleben's observations. He appears alongside Suzanne Simard, a professor of forest ecology at the University of British Columbia, who has been doing research on interactions among trees through micorrhizal networks since 1997.

A second documentary film was released under the title The Hidden Life of Trees in theaters in the United States. It had its UK premiere at the 2021 Wales One World Film Festival, which was presented online owing to the COVID-19 pandemic.

=== The Inner Life of Animals ===
In 2016, Wohlleben authored Das Seelenleben der Tiere, which was translated into English and published under the title The Inner Life of Animals: Love, Grief, and Compassion—Surprising Observations of a Hidden World in 2017. The book argues for animal sentience. It contains 41 short chapters with examples of animals exhibiting emotions such as courage, desire, grief, love and regret.

=== The Power of Trees ===
Wohlleben's 2023 book explores the role of ancient forests in combating climate change, and how forest management practices have impaired forests' natural functions. "The future of forests and the future of humanity are inextricably entwined," he writes in the introduction, crediting trees for their ability to remove greenhouse gases from the atmosphere, cool the local climate and increase rainfall.

== Major works ==
- The Hidden Life of Trees: What They Feel, How They Communicate – Discoveries from a Secret World (Greystone Books, 2015)
- The Inner Life of Animals: Love, Grief, and Compassion: Surprising Observations of a Hidden World (Greystone Books, 2016)
- The Secret Wisdom of Nature: Trees, Animals, and the Extraordinary Balance of All Living Things ― Stories from Science and Observation (Greystone Books, 2017)
- Can You Hear the Trees Talking?: Discovering The Hidden Life of the Forest (Greystone Kids, 2019)
- Peter and the Tree Children (Greystone Kids, 2020)
- The Heartbeat of Trees: Embracing Our Ancient Bond with Forests and Nature (Greystone Books, 2021)
- The Power of Trees: How Ancient Forests Can Save Us if We Let Them (Greystone Books, 2023)
