= Borderlines Film Festival =

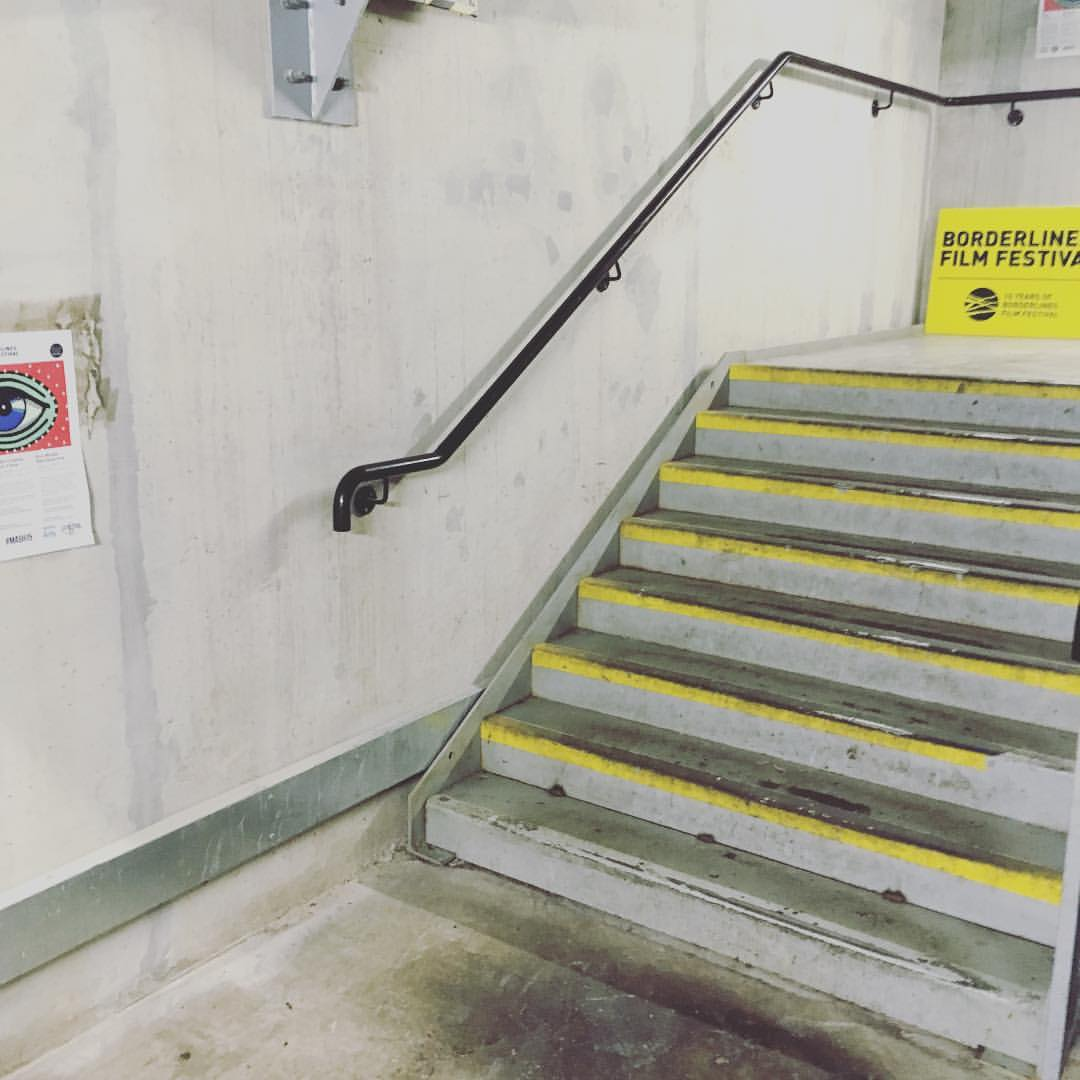
- Location: Herefordshire, Shropshire, Powys and Worcestershire, UK
- Founded: 2002
- Festival date: February 28, 2020 March 15, 2020
- Website: borderlinesfilmfestival.co.uk

Borderlines is an annual film festival held in multiple locations around the Herefordshire, Shropshire and Powys borders. The first festival took place in 2003.

== History ==
Borderlines Film Festival started in 2002 with the ambition to deliver a rural film festival covering Herefordshire and Shropshire, with the inaugural festival launched in 2003. The founding director was David Gillam, who remained director until 2013, and was also inaugural director of the Wales One World Film Festival. Borderlines was reportedly the country's first rural film festival.

By 2015 it was reported as being "the UK's largest rural film festival". In 2019 the event attracted 21,678 in attendance.

The festival has shown films in a range of unusual circumstances, including a cycle ride to a moviebus and showing Casablanca in an aircraft hangar in Shobdon.

== Description ==
The festival is held in multiple locations around the Herefordshire, Shropshire and Powys

As of 2013, Borderlines had two patrons: Francine Stock and Chris Menges.
