= The Hidden Life of Trees =

2015 book by Peter Wohlleben

- Author: Peter Wohlleben
- Translator: Jane Billinghurst
- Language: German
- Publisher: Ludwig Verlag
- Publication date: 2015
- Publication place: Germany
- English publication date: 2016
- Pages: 223
- ISBN: 978-3-453-28067-0

The Hidden Life of Trees: What They Feel, How They Communicate: Discoveries from a Secret World (German: Das geheime Leben der Bäume. Was sie fühlen, wie sie kommunizieren – die Entdeckung einer verborgenen Welt) is a 2015 book by the German writer Peter Wohlleben.

== Summary ==
The book is about how trees grow and co-exist in their ecosystems. It mixes popular science and Peter Wohlleben's personal experience from working with tourism and forest management. It lays out an ethic for forest management developed by Wohlleben, which calls for forests to be left as undisturbed by humans as possible, and opposes monoculture plantations and heavy machinery.

== Reception ==
The Hidden Life of Trees was published in German in 2015 and in English translation in 2016. It got a positive reception from lay people and became a bestseller. Its use of scientific research to advance an ethic and spiritual programme received harsh criticism from forestry scientists. It led to discussions in German- and French-language media about science communication. Two German scientists created an online petition in February 2017 calling for more scientists to challenge Wohlleben publicly, titled Auch im Wald: Fakten statt Märchen, Wissenschaft statt Wohlleben (lit. 'Even in the forest: facts instead of fairy tales, science instead of Wohlleben').

== Legacy ==
Wohlleben wrote two sequels to The Hidden Life of Trees: The Inner Life of Animals from 2016 and The Secret Network of Nature from 2017. The books are collectively called the Mysteries of Nature trilogy.

The Hidden Life of Trees was the basis for the 2020 documentary film The Hidden Life of Trees directed by Jörg Adolph. The book was adapted into a French comic book with the same title. It was written by Fred Bernard, illustrated by Benjamin Flao and published in 2023.
