= Operation Crosstie =

Series of 1960s US nuclear tests

- Crosstie Faultless, 1 megaton.

Information
- Country: United States
- Test site: Central Nevada; near Farmington, New Mexico; NTS Area 12, Rainier Mesa; NTS Area 19, 20, Pahute Mesa; NTS Area 30, Dome Mountain; NTS Areas 5, 11, Frenchman Flat; NTS, Areas 1–4, 6–10, Yucca Flat
- Period: 1967–1968
- Number of tests: 48
- Test type: cratering, underground shaft, tunnel
- Max. yield: 1.3 megatonnes of TNT (5.4 PJ)

Test series chronology

Operation Crosstie was a series of 48 nuclear tests conducted by the United States in 1967–1968 at the Nevada Test Site. These tests followed the Operation Latchkey series and preceded the Operation Bowline series.

== Nuclear tests ==
=== Gasbuggy ===
The blast designated Gasbuggy involved an underground detonation, intended to stimulate production of natural gas by cracking the rock in the underground formation of its deposit. The test proceeded as expected, but not only did the production not increase as much as expected, but the customers also refused to buy gas contaminated with traces of radioisotopes.

=== Faultless ===
The Faultless test was a calibration test conducted in a mine cavity 980 metres (3,200 ft) beneath the Hot Creek Valley near Tonopah, Nevada, with a yield of around 1 megaton. This test was conducted to see if the land was fit for testing a 5 megaton thermonuclear warhead for the Spartan missile. The test failed because of the large degree of faulting that resulted in the area around the test. It was decided that the land was unfit for multi-megaton nuclear tests, so a similar calibration test was conducted at Amchitka Island, Alaska, in the fall of 1969 during Operation Mandrel.

The 2.4-metre (8 ft) diameter steel pipe that was used to place the bomb remains at the test site. The top of the pipe was originally flush with the surface; however, the ground sank by 2.7 metres (9 ft) following the explosion. A plaque is mounted on the exposed pipe to commemorate the event.

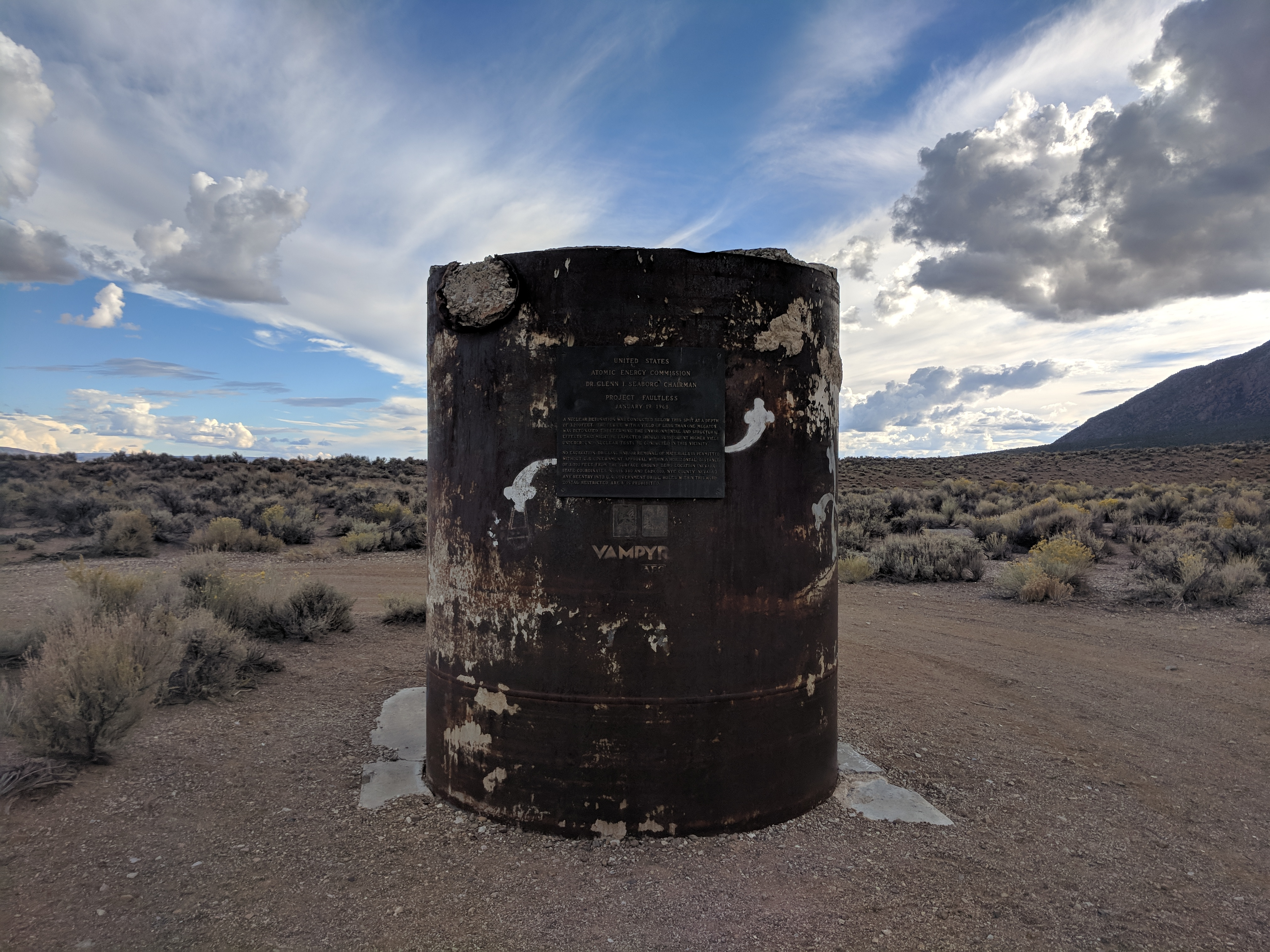
Plaque at the Project Faultless test site.

=== Buggy ===
Buggy was a Plowshare test designed to excavate a channel. It was a simultaneous detonation of 5 devices, placed 150 feet (46 m) apart and 150 feet (46 m) below the surface that resulted in a channel 300 feet (91 m) wide, 900 feet long, and 80 feet (24 m) deep. Or 65 feet deep and 254 feet wide, according to declassified U.S. film.

The USSR conducted a similar salvo-test to investigate the use of nuclear explosions in the construction of the Pechora–Kama Canal project. On March 23, 1971, three simultaneously detonated 15 kiloton underground nuclear charges were exploded in the Taiga test.

=== Rickey ===
Rickey was the first Los Alamos test to use a television PINEX (pin-hole neutron experiment) system. A fluor was imaged using a newtonian telescope which was split for imaging by two cameras by a beam splitter. The instrument package containing the television system was protected from neutrons and gamma rays by kinking the path between it and the nuclear device and by placing baffles along the optical path pipe.

== List of nuclear tests ==
The United States's Crosstie nuclear test series was a group of 48 nuclear tests conducted in 1967–1968. These tests (Note: A bomb test may be a salvo test, defined as two or more explosions "where a period of time between successive individual explosions does not exceed 5 seconds and where the burial points of all explosive devices can be connected by segments of straight lines, each of them connecting two burial points and does not exceed 40 kilometers in length".Mikhailov, V. N. "Catalog of World Wide Nuclear Testing". Begell-Atom. Archived from the original on April 26, 2014.) followed the Operation Latchkey series and preceded the Operation Bowline series.

United States' Crosstie series tests and detonations
| Name (Note: The US, France and Great Britain have code-named their test events, while the USSR and China did not, and therefore have only test numbers (with some exceptions – Soviet peaceful explosions were named). Word translations into English in parentheses unless the name is a proper noun. A dash followed by a number indicates a member of a salvo event. The US also sometimes named the individual explosions in such a salvo test, which results in "name1 – 1(with name2)". If test is canceled or aborted, then the row data like date and location discloses the intended plans, where known.) | Date time (UT) | Local time zone (Note: To convert the UT time into standard local, add the number of hours in parentheses to the UT time; for local daylight saving time, add one additional hour. If the result is earlier than 00:00, add 24 hours and subtract 1 from the day; if it is 24:00 or later, subtract 24 hours and add 1 to the day.) | Location (Note: Rough place name and a latitude/longitude reference; for rocket-carried tests, the launch location is specified before the detonation location, if known. Some locations are extremely accurate; others (like airdrops and space blasts) may be quite inaccurate. "~" indicates a likely pro-forma rough location, shared with other tests in that same area.) | Elevation + height (Note: Elevation is the ground level at the point directly below the explosion relative to sea level; height is the additional distance added or subtracted by tower, balloon, shaft, tunnel, air drop or other contrivance. For rocket bursts the ground level is "N/A". In some cases it is not clear if the height is absolute or relative to ground, for example, Plumbbob/John. No number or units indicates the value is unknown, while "0" means zero. Sorting on this column is by elevation and height added together.) | Delivery (Note: Atmospheric, airdrop, balloon, gun, cruise missile, rocket, surface, tower, and barge are all disallowed by the Partial Nuclear Test Ban Treaty. Sealed shaft and tunnel are underground, and remained useful under the PTBT. Intentional cratering tests are borderline; they occurred under the treaty, were sometimes protested, and generally overlooked if the test was declared to be a peaceful use.) Purpose (Note: Include weapons development, weapon effects, safety test, transport safety test, war, science, joint verification and industrial/peaceful, which may be further broken down.) | Device (Note: Designations for test items where known, "?" indicates some uncertainty about the preceding value, nicknames for particular devices in quotes. This category of information is often not officially disclosed.) | Yield (Note: Estimated energy yield in tons, kilotons, and megatons. A ton of TNT equivalent is defined as 4.184 gigajoules (1 gigacalorie).) | Fallout (Note: Radioactive emission to the atmosphere aside from prompt neutrons, where known. The measured species is only iodine-131 if mentioned, otherwise it is all species. No entry means unknown, probably none if underground and "all" if not; otherwise notation for whether measured on the site only or off the site, where known, and the measured amount of radioactivity released.) | References | Notes |
|---|---|---|---|---|---|---|---|---|---|---|
| Vito | July 14, 1967 13:30:00.08 | PST (–8 hrs) | NTS Area U10ab 37.1652°N 116.0458°W | 1,278 m (4,193 ft) – 90.83 m (298.0 ft) | underground shaft, safety experiment | | less than 20 kt | | | |
| Stanley | July 27, 1967 13:00:00.12 | PST (–8 hrs) | NTS Area U10g 37.14879°N 116.04938°W | 1,265 m (4,150 ft) – 483.72 m (1,587.0 ft) | underground shaft, weapons development | | 22 kt | Venting detected, 37 Ci (1,400 GBq) | | |
| Gibson | August 4, 1967 14:00:00.04 | PST (–8 hrs) | NTS Area U3ew 37.02431°N 116.01315°W | 1,186 m (3,891 ft) – 240.76 m (789.9 ft) | underground shaft, weapons development | | 1.5 kt | | | |
| Washer | August 10, 1967 14:10:00.0 | PST (–8 hrs) | NTS Area U10r 37.15665°N 116.04815°W | 1,271 m (4,170 ft) – 467.41 m (1,533.5 ft) | underground shaft, weapons development | | less than 20 kt | Venting detected, 0.5 Ci (19 GBq) | | |
| Bordeaux | August 18, 1967 20:12:30.04 | PST (–8 hrs) | NTS Area U3dr 37.01219°N 116.03717°W | 1,183 m (3,881 ft) – 332.02 m (1,089.3 ft) | underground shaft, weapons development | | 18 kt | | | |
| Lexington | August 24, 1967 13:30:00.0 | PST (–8 hrs) | NTS Area U2bm 37.16266°N 116.07504°W | 1,310 m (4,300 ft) – 227.69 m (747.0 ft) | underground shaft, weapons development | | 800 t | Venting detected, 1.1 kCi (41 TBq) | | |
| Door Mist | August 31, 1967 16:30:00.04 | PST (–8 hrs) | NTS Area U12g.07 37.17751°N 116.20982°W | 2,295 m (7,530 ft) – 435.86 m (1,430.0 ft) | tunnel, weapon effect | | 20 kt | Venting detected off site, 690 kCi (26,000 TBq) | | |
| Yard | September 7, 1967 13:45:00.0 | PST (–8 hrs) | NTS Area U10af 37.15301°N 116.0536°W | 1,270 m (4,170 ft) – 520.6 m (1,708 ft) | underground shaft, weapons development | | 22 kt | Venting detected, 0.3 Ci (11 GBq) | | |
| Gilroy | September 15, 1967 17:30:00.04 | PST (–8 hrs) | NTS Area U3ex 37.03484°N 116.0216°W | 1,191 m (3,907 ft) – 240.63 m (789.5 ft) | underground shaft, weapons development | | less than 20 kt | Venting detected | | |
| Marvel | September 21, 1967 20:45:00.0 | PST (–8 hrs) | NTS Area U10ds1 37.16595°N 116.03929°W | 1,288 m (4,226 ft) – 174.35 m (572.0 ft) | underground shaft, peaceful research | | 2.2 kt | Venting detected on site, 27 Ci (1,000 GBq) | | Plowshare – explore underground phenomena concerning emplacement techniques. |
| Zaza | September 27, 1967 17:00:00.04 | PST (–8 hrs) | NTS Area U4c 37.09899°N 116.05475°W | 1,240 m (4,070 ft) – 667 m (2,188 ft) | underground shaft, weapons development | | 160 kt | | | |
| Lanpher | October 18, 1967 14:30:00.08 | PST (–8 hrs) | NTS Area U2x 37.11554°N 116.05848°W | 1,255 m (4,117 ft) – 714.2 m (2,343 ft) | underground shaft, weapons development | | 160 kt | Venting detected, 5 Ci (180 GBq) | | |
| Cognac | October 25, 1967 14:30:00.14 | PST (–8 hrs) | NTS Area U3fm 37.04975°N 116.04044°W | 1,202 m (3,944 ft) – 240.39 m (788.7 ft) | underground shaft, weapons development | | less than 20 kt | Venting detected on site, 0.064 Ci (2.4 GBq) | | |
| Sazerac | October 25, 1967 14:30:00.06 | PST (–8 hrs) | NTS Area U3fa 37.0316°N 116.02709°W | 1,191 m (3,907 ft) – 301.34 m (988.6 ft) | underground shaft, weapons development | | 9 kt | Venting detected, 0.1 Ci (3.7 GBq) | | |
| Worth | October 25, 1967 14:45:00.08 | PST (–8 hrs) | NTS Area U10ag 37.15629°N 116.04946°W | 1,269 m (4,163 ft) – 197 m (646 ft) | underground shaft, weapons development | | less than 20 kt | Venting detected, 40 Ci (1,500 GBq) | | |
| Cobbler | November 8, 1967 15:00:00.04 | PST (–8 hrs) | NTS Area U7u 37.09176°N 116.03667°W | 1,242 m (4,075 ft) – 667.12 m (2,188.7 ft) | underground shaft, weapons development | | 20 kt | | | |
| Polka | December 6, 1967 13:00:00.0 | PST (–8 hrs) | NTS Area U10ai 37.15922°N 116.05382°W | 1,273 m (4,177 ft) – 195.01 m (639.8 ft) | underground shaft, weapons development | | 200 t | Venting detected, 380 Ci (14,000 GBq) | | |
| Gasbuggy | December 10, 1967 19:30:00.14 | MST (–7 hrs) | near Farmington, New Mexico 36.6778°N 107.2089°W | 2,179 m (7,149 ft) – 1,290 m (4,230 ft) | underground shaft, peaceful research | | 29 kt | | | Project Plowshare – stimulate gas production in a low permeability field. |
| Stilt | December 15, 1967 15:00:00.04 | PST (–8 hrs) | NTS Area U3fh 37.03666°N 116.00273°W | 1,204 m (3,950 ft) – 332.43 m (1,090.6 ft) | underground shaft, weapons development | | 2 kt | | | |
| Hupmobile | January 18, 1968 16:30:00.13 | PST (–8 hrs) | NTS Area U2y 37.14554°N 116.06654°W | 1,287 m (4,222 ft) – 246.89 m (810.0 ft) | underground shaft, weapon effect | | 7.4 kt | Venting detected off site, 120 kCi (4,400 TBq) | | |
| Staccato | January 19, 1968 15:00:00.0 | PST (–8 hrs) | NTS Area U10ah 37.15633°N 116.05475°W | 1,272 m (4,173 ft) – 443.48 m (1,455.0 ft) | underground shaft, weapons development | | 50 kt | Venting detected, 8 Ci (300 GBq) | | |
| Faultless | January 19, 1968 18:15:00.08 | PST (–8 hrs) | Central Nevada 38.63421°N 116.21622°W | 1,866 m (6,122 ft) – 980 m (3,220 ft) | underground shaft, weapon effect | | 1 Mt | | | A calibration test for a 5 Mt Spartan test; due to geological failure (local faulting on the site), test Adagio cancelled, and moved to Amchitka Island in Alaska; see Milrow and Cannikin. |
| Brush | January 24, 1968 15:00:00.04 | PST (–8 hrs) | NTS Area U3eq 37.04277°N 116.01466°W | 1,199 m (3,934 ft) – 118.3 m (388 ft) | underground shaft, weapons development | | less than 20 kt | Venting detected on site, 0.00002 Ci (0.00074 GBq) | | |
| Cabriolet | January 26, 1968 16:00:00.11 | PST (–8 hrs) | NTS Area U20l 37.28079°N 116.51544°W | 1,862 m (6,109 ft) – 51.82 m (170.0 ft) | cratering, peaceful research | | 2.3 kt | Venting detected off site, 220 kCi (8,100 TBq) | | Project Plowshare – cratering mechanics in hard, dry rock, and radionuclide dispersal. |
| Mallet | January 31, 1968 15:30:00.04 | PST (–8 hrs) | NTS Area U3fv 37.00098°N 116.01002°W | 1,177 m (3,862 ft) – 240.27 m (788.3 ft) | underground shaft, weapons development | | 4 kt | | | |
| Torch | February 21, 1968 15:00:00.04 | PST (–8 hrs) | NTS Area U3fj 37.04161°N 116.00269°W | 1,210 m (3,970 ft) – 240.55 m (789.2 ft) | underground shaft, weapons development | | less than 20 kt | | | |
| Knox | February 21, 1968 15:30:00.0 | PST (–8 hrs) | NTS Area U2at 37.11633°N 116.05508°W | 1,253 m (4,111 ft) – 644.8 m (2,115 ft) | underground shaft, weapons development | | 200 kt | Venting detected, 160 Ci (5,900 GBq) | | |
| Dorsal Fin | February 29, 1968 17:08:30.04 | PST (–8 hrs) | NTS Area U12e.10 37.18456°N 116.21232°W | 2,260 m (7,410 ft) – 410.06 m (1,345.3 ft) | tunnel, weapon effect | | 20 kt | | | |
| Russet | March 5, 1968 15:30:00.04 | PST (–8 hrs) | NTS Area U6a 36.97002°N 116.05653°W | 1,170 m (3,840 ft) – 119.79 m (393.0 ft) | underground shaft, weapons development | | less than 20 kt | Venting detected on site, 29 Ci (1,100 GBq) | | |
| Buggy - 1 | March 12, 1968 17:04:00.11 | PST (–8 hrs) | NTS Area U30a 37.00745°N 116.37086°W | 1,560 m (5,120 ft) – 50.29 m (165.0 ft) | cratering, peaceful research | | 1.1 kt | Venting detected off site, 1.2 MCi (44 PBq) | | Simultaneous, separate holes. Project Plowshare – row charge experiment. |
| Buggy - 2 | March 12, 1968 17:04:00.11 | PST (–8 hrs) | NTS Area U30b 37.00759°N 116.37133°W | 1,560 m (5,120 ft) – 50.29 m (165.0 ft) | cratering, peaceful research | | 1.1 kt | Venting detected off site | | Simultaneous, separate holes. Project Plowshare – row charge experiment. |
| Buggy - 3 | March 12, 1968 17:04:00.11 | PST (–8 hrs) | NTS Area U30c 37.00773°N 116.37181°W | 1,561 m (5,121 ft) – 50.29 m (165.0 ft) | cratering, peaceful research | | 1.1 kt | Venting detected off site | | Simultaneous, separate holes. Project Plowshare – row charge experiment. |
| Buggy - 4 | March 12, 1968 17:04:00.11 | PST (–8 hrs) | NTS Area U30d 37.00788°N 116.37229°W | 1,560 m (5,120 ft) – 50.29 m (165.0 ft) | cratering, peaceful research | | 1.1 kt | Venting detected off site | | Simultaneous, separate holes. Project Plowshare – row charge experiment. |
| Buggy - 5 | March 12, 1968 17:04:00.11 | PST (–8 hrs) | NTS Area U30e 37.00803°N 116.37277°W | 1,560 m (5,120 ft) – 50.29 m (165.0 ft) | cratering, peaceful research | | 1.1 kt | Venting detected off site | | Simultaneous, separate holes. Project Plowshare – row charge experiment. |
| Pommard | March 14, 1968 15:19:00.06 | PST (–8 hrs) | NTS Area U3ee 37.0477°N 116.01155°W | 1,208 m (3,963 ft) – 209.1 m (686 ft) | underground shaft, weapons development | | 1.5 kt | | | |
| Stinger | March 22, 1968 15:00:00.04 | PST (–8 hrs) | NTS Area U19l 37.33256°N 116.31155°W | 2,035 m (6,677 ft) – 667.76 m (2,190.8 ft) | underground shaft, weapons development | | 120 kt | | | |
| Milk Shake | March 25, 1968 18:44:27.04 | PST (–8 hrs) | NTS Area U5k 36.87168°N 115.932°W | 993 m (3,258 ft) – 264.57 m (868.0 ft) | underground shaft, weapon effect | | 10 kt | Venting detected on site, 30 Ci (1,100 GBq) | | |
| Bevel | April 4, 1968 15:02:00.04 | PST (–8 hrs) | NTS Area U3fu 37.0523°N 116.02162°W | 1,205 m (3,953 ft) – 240.75 m (789.9 ft) | underground shaft, weapons development | | less than 20 kt | | | |
| Noor - 1 (with Throw) | April 10, 1968 14:00:00.0 | PST (–8 hrs) | NTS Area U2be 37.15434°N 116.07973°W | 1,310 m (4,300 ft) – 381.81 m (1,252.7 ft) | underground shaft, weapons development | | 20 kt | Venting detected, 1 Ci (37 GBq) | | Simultaneous, separate holes. |
| Throw - 2 (with Noor) | April 10, 1968 14:00:00.0 | PST (–8 hrs) | NTS Area U2bg 37.15667°N 116.08323°W | 1,316 m (4,318 ft) + N/A | underground shaft, weapons development | | 2 kt | | | Simultaneous, separate holes. |
| Shuffle | April 18, 1968 14:05:00.0 | PST (–8 hrs) | NTS Area U10t 37.15236°N 116.03826°W | 1,279 m (4,196 ft) – 493.47 m (1,619.0 ft) | underground shaft, weapons development | | 20 kt | Venting detected, 19 Ci (700 GBq) | | |
| Scroll | April 23, 1968 17:01:30.08 | PST (–8 hrs) | NTS Area U19n 37.33767°N 116.37647°W | 2,032 m (6,667 ft) – 228.6 m (750 ft) | underground shaft, joint verification | | 6 kt | Venting detected on site, 18 kCi (670 TBq) | | Designed to test detection of underground nuclear tests; see Vela Uniform. |
| Boxcar | April 26, 1968 15:00:00.07 | PST (–8 hrs) | NTS Area U20i - 37.29488°N 116.45714°W | 1,914 m (6,280 ft) – 1,160.89 m (3,808.7 ft) | underground shaft, weapons development | | 1.3 Mt | | | |
| Hatchet | May 3, 1968 16:00:00.04 | PST (–8 hrs) | NTS Area U3fz 37.02853°N 116.0206°W | 1,188 m (3,898 ft) – 240.53 m (789.1 ft) | underground shaft, weapons development | | 2 kt | | | |
| Crock | May 8, 1968 14:10:00.0 | PST (–8 hrs) | NTS Area U10ak 37.15731°N 116.03582°W | 1,289 m (4,229 ft) – 181.76 m (596.3 ft) | underground shaft, weapons development | | 1 kt | Venting detected, 140 Ci (5,200 GBq) | | |
| Clarksmobile | May 17, 1968 13:00:00.0 | PST (–8 hrs) | NTS Area U2as 37.12001°N 116.0597°W | 1,259 m (4,131 ft) – 472.65 m (1,550.7 ft) | underground shaft, weapons development | | 20 kt | | | |
| Adze | May 28, 1968 14:45:00.04 | PST (–8 hrs) | NTS Area U3fw 37.00861°N 115.99614°W | 1,188 m (3,898 ft) – 240.03 m (787.5 ft) | underground shaft, weapons development | | less than 20 kt | Venting detected on site | | |
| Wembley | June 5, 1968 14:21:30.04 | PST (–8 hrs) | NTS Area U3ey 37.03482°N 116.01678°W | 1,191 m (3,907 ft) – 238.09 m (781.1 ft) | underground shaft, weapons development | | 1.5 kt | | | |
| Tub - 1 | June 6, 1968 21:30:00.0 | PST (–8 hrs) | NTS Area U10ajc 37.16743°N 116.04336°W | 1,282 m (4,206 ft) – 188.98 m (620.0 ft) | underground shaft, weapons development | | unknown yield | | | Simultaneous, separate holes. |
| Tub - 2 | June 6, 1968 21:30:00.0 | PST (–8 hrs) | NTS Area U10ajb 37.16536°N 116.04431°W | 1,279 m (4,196 ft) + N/A | underground shaft, weapons development | | unknown yield | | | Simultaneous, separate holes. |
| Tub - 3 | June 6, 1968 21:30:00.0 | PST (–8 hrs) | NTS Area U10ajf 37.16535°N 116.04155°W | 1,283 m (4,209 ft) + N/A | underground shaft, weapons development | | unknown yield | | | Simultaneous, separate holes. |
| Tub - 4 | June 6, 1968 21:30:00.0 | PST (–8 hrs) | NTS Area U10ajd 37.16694°N 116.04568°W | 1,278 m (4,193 ft) – 273 m (896 ft) | underground shaft, weapons development | | unknown yield | Venting detected, 1.6 kCi (59 TBq) | | Simultaneous, separate holes. |
| Tub - 5 | June 6, 1968 21:30:00.0 | PST (–8 hrs) | NTS Area U10aja 37.16693°N 116.04293°W | 1,282 m (4,206 ft) + N/A | underground shaft, weapons development | | unknown yield | | | Simultaneous, separate holes. |
| Rickey | June 15, 1968 13:59:59.97 | PST (–8 hrs) | NTS Area U19c 37.26486°N 116.31552°W | 2,116 m (6,942 ft) – 683.28 m (2,241.7 ft) | underground shaft, weapons development | | 200 kt | | | |
| Funnel | June 25, 1968 15:30:00.04 | PST (–8 hrs) | NTS Area U3ga 37.04631°N 116.03102°W | 1,199 m (3,934 ft) – 118.7 m (389 ft) | underground shaft, weapons development | | less than 20 kt | Venting detected on site, 0.00002 Ci (0.00074 GBq) | | |
| Sevilla | June 25, 1968 15:30:00.04 | PST (–8 hrs) | NTS Area U3fk 37.04156°N 115.99309°W | 1,226 m (4,022 ft) – 358.65 m (1,176.7 ft) | underground shaft, weapons development | | less than 20 kt | Venting detected on site, 0.004 Ci (0.15 GBq) | | |
| Chateaugay | June 28, 1968 12:22:00.08 | PST (–8 hrs) | NTS Area U20t 37.24547°N 116.4838°W | 1,876 m (6,155 ft) – 607.02 m (1,991.5 ft) | underground shaft, weapons development | | 58 kt | | | |
