= Operation Bowline =

Series of 1960s US nuclear tests

- Bowline Schooner, 30 kilotons

Information
- Country: United States
- Test site: NTS Area 12, Rainier Mesa; NTS Area 16, Shoshone Mountain; NTS Area 19, 20, Pahute Mesa; NTS Areas 5, 11, Frenchman Flat; NTS, Areas 1–4, 6–10, Yucca Flat
- Period: 1968–1969
- Number of tests: 47
- Test type: cratering, underground shaft, tunnel
- Max. yield: 1.2 megatonnes of TNT (5.0 PJ)

Test series chronology

The United States's Bowline nuclear test series was a group of 47 nuclear tests conducted in 1968–1969. These tests (Note: A bomb test may be a salvo test, defined as two or more explosions "where a period of time between successive individual explosions does not exceed 5 seconds and where the burial points of all explosive devices can be connected by segments of straight lines, each of them connecting two burial points and does not exceed 40 kilometers in length". Mikhailov, V. N. "Catalog of World Wide Nuclear Testing". Begell-Atom. Archived from the original on April 26, 2014.) followed the Operation Crosstie series and preceded the Operation Mandrel series.

United States' Bowline series tests and detonations
Name (Note: The US, France and Great Britain have code-named their test events, while the USSR and China did not, and therefore have only test numbers (with some exceptions – Soviet peaceful explosions were named). Word translations into English in parentheses unless the name is a proper noun. A dash followed by a number indicates a member of a salvo event. The US also sometimes named the individual explosions in such a salvo test, which results in "name1 – 1(with name2)". If test is canceled or aborted, then the row data like date and location discloses the intended plans, where known.)	Date time (UT)	Local time zone (Note: To convert the UT time into standard local, add the number of hours in parentheses to the UT time; for local daylight saving time, add one additional hour. If the result is earlier than 00:00, add 24 hours and subtract 1 from the day; if it is 24:00 or later, subtract 24 hours and add 1 to the day. Historical time zone data obtained from the IANA time zone database.)	Location (Note: Rough place name and a latitude/longitude reference; for rocket-carried tests, the launch location is specified before the detonation location, if known. Some locations are extremely accurate; others (like airdrops and space blasts) may be quite inaccurate. "~" indicates a likely pro-forma rough location, shared with other tests in that same area.)	Elevation + height (Note: Elevation is the ground level at the point directly below the explosion relative to sea level; height is the additional distance added or subtracted by tower, balloon, shaft, tunnel, air drop or other contrivance. For rocket bursts the ground level is "N/A". In some cases it is not clear if the height is absolute or relative to ground, for example, Plumbbob/John. No number or units indicates the value is unknown, while "0" means zero. Sorting on this column is by elevation and height added together.)	Delivery (Note: Atmospheric, airdrop, balloon, gun, cruise missile, rocket, surface, tower, and barge are all disallowed by the Partial Nuclear Test Ban Treaty. Sealed shaft and tunnel are underground, and remained useful under the PTBT. Intentional cratering tests are borderline; they occurred under the treaty, were sometimes protested, and generally overlooked if the test was declared to be a peaceful use.) Purpose (Note: Include weapons development, weapon effects, safety test, transport safety test, war, science, joint verification and industrial/peaceful, which may be further broken down.)	Device (Note: Designations for test items where known, "?" indicates some uncertainty about the preceding value, nicknames for particular devices in quotes. This category of information is often not officially disclosed.)	Yield (Note: Estimated energy yield in tons, kilotons, and megatons. A ton of TNT equivalent is defined as 4.184 gigajoules (1 gigacalorie).)	Fallout (Note: Radioactive emission to the atmosphere aside from prompt neutrons, where known. The measured species is only iodine-131 if mentioned, otherwise it is all species. No entry means unknown, probably none if underground and "all" if not; otherwise notation for whether measured on the site only or off the site, where known, and the measured amount of radioactivity released.)	References	Notes
Spud	July 17, 1968 14:00:00.04	PST (–8 hrs)	NTS Area U3fy 37.00095°N 115.99962°W	1,178 m (3,865 ft) – 240.29 m (788.4 ft)	underground shaft, weapons development		1.5 kt			
Tanya	July 30, 1968 13:00:00.0	PST (–8 hrs)	NTS Area U2dt 37.13317°N 116.08312°W	1,271 m (4,170 ft) – 381 m (1,250 ft)	underground shaft, weapons development		20 kt	Venting detected, 140 Ci (5,200 GBq)		
Imp	August 9, 1968 13:00:00.0	PST (–8 hrs)	NTS Area U2bj 37.16176°N 116.07808°W	1,314 m (4,311 ft) – 178.46 m (585.5 ft)	underground shaft, weapons development		350 t	Venting detected on site, 4.2 kCi (160 TBq)		
Rack	August 15, 1968 17:00:00.0	PST (–8 hrs)	NTS Area U9ap 37.12373°N 116.0491°W	1,254 m (4,114 ft) – 199.72 m (655.2 ft)	underground shaft, weapons development		1 kt	Venting detected, 10 Ci (370 GBq)		
Diana Moon	August 27, 1968 16:30:00.04	PST (–8 hrs)	NTS Area U11e 36.87718°N 115.93195°W	1,004 m (3,294 ft) – 242.01 m (794.0 ft)	underground shaft, weapon effect		9 kt	Venting detected on site, 12 kCi (440 TBq)		
Sled	August 29, 1968 22:45:00.04	PST (–8 hrs)	NTS Area U19j 37.25028°N 116.34777°W	2,057 m (6,749 ft) – 728.88 m (2,391.3 ft)	underground shaft, weapons development		200 kt			
Noggin	September 6, 1968 14:00:00.13	PST (–8 hrs)	NTS Area U9bx 37.13597°N 116.04824°W	1,259 m (4,131 ft) – 581.99 m (1,909.4 ft)	underground shaft, weapons development		120 kt	Venting detected, 16 Ci (590 GBq)		
Knife-A	September 12, 1968 14:00:00.04	PST (–8 hrs)	NTS Area U3fb 37.03178°N 116.01237°W	1,190 m (3,900 ft) – 331.8 m (1,089 ft)	underground shaft, weapons development		20 kt			
Stoddard	September 17, 1968 14:00:00.04	PST (–8 hrs)	NTS Area U2cms 37.11981°N 116.12835°W	1,370 m (4,490 ft) – 467.87 m (1,535.0 ft)	underground shaft, peaceful research		31 kt	Venting detected, 16 Ci (590 GBq)		Project Plowshare – clean excavation device development.
Hudson Seal	September 24, 1968 17:05:01.09	PST (–8 hrs)	NTS Area U12n.04 37.20473°N 116.20727°W	2,168 m (7,113 ft) – 344.42 m (1,130.0 ft)	tunnel, weapon effect		20 kt			
Welder	October 3, 1968 14:00:00.04	PST (–8 hrs)	NTS Area U3fs 37.04665°N 116.03048°W	1,199 m (3,934 ft) – 117.66 m (386.0 ft)	underground shaft, safety experiment		less than 20 kt			
Knife-C	October 3, 1968 14:29:00.04	PST (–8 hrs)	NTS Area U3er 37.02591°N 115.99396°W	1,201 m (3,940 ft) – 301.44 m (989.0 ft)	underground shaft, weapons development		3 kt			
Vat	October 10, 1968 14:30:00.04	PST (–8 hrs)	NTS Area U9cf 37.13327°N 116.04318°W	1,256 m (4,121 ft) – 194.92 m (639.5 ft)	underground shaft, weapons development		1 kt			
Hula	October 29, 1968 15:36:00.09	PST (–8 hrs)	NTS Area U9bu 37.11321°N 116.0418°W	1,254 m (4,114 ft) – 198.46 m (651.1 ft)	underground shaft, weapons development		250 t	Venting detected on site, 7 Ci (260 GBq)		
Bit - 1	October 31, 1968 18:30:00.04	PST (–8 hrs)	NTS Area U3gt 37.04701°N 116.03021°W	1,199 m (3,934 ft) – 148.31 m (486.6 ft)	underground shaft, safety experiment		1 kt			simultaneous, separate holes.
Bit - 2	October 31, 1968 18:30:00.04	PST (–8 hrs)	NTS Area U3gt 37.04699°N 116.03034°W	1,199 m (3,934 ft) +	underground shaft, safety experiment		less than 20 kt			simultaneous, separate holes.
File	October 31, 1968 18:30:00.04	PST (–8 hrs)	NTS Area U3gb 37.01708°N 116.03649°W	1,185 m (3,888 ft) – 228.95 m (751.1 ft)	underground shaft, weapons development		7 kt			
Crew - 1	November 4, 1968 15:15:00.09	PST (–8 hrs)	NTS Area U2db 37.13043°N 116.08738°W	1,287 m (4,222 ft) – 603.5 m (1,980 ft)	underground shaft, weapons development		22 kt			Simultaneous, same hole.
Crew - 2	November 4, 1968 15:16:00.09	PST (–8 hrs)	NTS Area U2db 37.13042°N 116.08738°W	1,287 m (4,222 ft) +	underground shaft, weapons development		less than 20 kt			Simultaneous, same hole.
Crew - 3	November 4, 1968 15:16:00.09	PST (–8 hrs)	NTS Area U2db 37.13042°N 116.08738°W	1,287 m (4,222 ft) +	underground shaft, weapons development		less than 20 kt			Simultaneous, same hole.
Auger	November 15, 1968 15:30:00.04	PST (–8 hrs)	NTS Area U3fx 37.04765°N 116.00058°W	1,222 m (4,009 ft) – 240.62 m (789.4 ft)	underground shaft, weapons development		1 kt			
Knife-B	November 15, 1968 15:45:00.04	PST (–8 hrs)	NTS Area U3dz 37.02609°N 116.03412°W	1,188 m (3,898 ft) – 362.94 m (1,190.7 ft)	underground shaft, weapons development		8 kt			
Ming Vase	November 20, 1968 18:00:00.03	PST (–8 hrs)	NTS Area U16a.04 37.00973°N 116.2072°W	1,931 m (6,335 ft) – 307.94 m (1,010.3 ft)	tunnel, weapon effect		16 kt			
Tinderbox	November 22, 1968 16:19:00.04	PST (–8 hrs)	NTS Area U9az 37.13987°N 116.04312°W	1,261 m (4,137 ft) – 439.52 m (1,442.0 ft)	underground shaft, weapons development		3 kt	Venting detected, 2 Ci (74 GBq)		
Schooner	December 8, 1968 16:00:00.14	PST (–8 hrs)	NTS Area U20u 37.34326°N 116.56661°W	1,668 m (5,472 ft) – 111.22 m (364.9 ft)	cratering, peaceful research		30 kt	Venting detected off site, 3.7 MCi (140 PBq)		Plowshare – excavation experiment in hard, dry rock.
Bay Leaf	December 12, 1968 15:00:00.04	PST (–8 hrs)	NTS Area U3gq 37.04702°N 116.03104°W	1,199 m (3,934 ft) – 130.16 m (427.0 ft)	underground shaft, safety experiment		less than 20 kt			simultaneous, separate holes.
Tyg - 1	December 12, 1968 15:10:00.08	PST (–8 hrs)	NTS Area U2dc1e 37.1209°N 116.08145°W	1,273 m (4,177 ft) – 228.3 m (749 ft)	underground shaft, weapons development		20 kt	Venting detected on site, 6.8 kCi (250 TBq)		
Tyg - 2	December 12, 1968 15:10:00.08	PST (–8 hrs)	NTS Area U2dc2d 37.11758°N 116.08035°W	1,270 m (4,170 ft) – 251 m (823 ft)	underground shaft, weapons development		3 kt	Venting detected on site		
Tyg - 3	December 12, 1968 15:10:00.08	PST (–8 hrs)	NTS Area U2dc3c 37.11804°N 116.07788°W	1,268 m (4,160 ft) – 228.3 m (749 ft)	underground shaft, weapons development		2 kt	Venting detected on site		
Tyg - 4	December 12, 1968 15:10:00.08	PST (–8 hrs)	NTS Area U2dc4a 37.12124°N 116.0791°W	1,272 m (4,173 ft) +	underground shaft, weapons development		1 kt	Venting detected on site		
Tyg - 5	December 12, 1968 15:10:00.08	PST (–8 hrs)	NTS Area U2dc5b 37.11985°N 116.07744°W	1,270 m (4,170 ft) +	underground shaft, weapons development		3 kt	Venting detected on site		
Tyg - 6	December 12, 1968 15:10:00.08	PST (–8 hrs)	NTS Area U2dc6f 37.11879°N 116.08278°W	1,273 m (4,177 ft) +	underground shaft, weapons development		4 kt	Venting detected on site		
Scissors	December 12, 1968 15:20:00.04	PST (–8 hrs)	NTS Area U3gh 37.00391°N 116.04°W	1,181 m (3,875 ft) – 240.58 m (789.3 ft)	underground shaft, weapons development		1 kt	Venting detected on site		
Benham	December 19, 1968 16:30:00.04	PST (–8 hrs)	NTS Area U20c - 37.23142°N 116.47448°W	1,887 m (6,191 ft) – 1,402.08 m (4,600.0 ft)	underground shaft, weapons development		1.2 Mt			
Packard	January 15, 1969 19:00:00.07	PST (–8 hrs)	NTS Area U2u 37.14787°N 116.06654°W	1,288 m (4,226 ft) – 246.89 m (810.0 ft)	underground shaft, weapon effect		10 kt	Venting detected on site, 7 Ci (260 GBq)		
Wineskin	January 15, 1969 19:30:00.04	PST (–8 hrs)	NTS Area U12r 37.20909°N 116.22627°W	2,263 m (7,425 ft) – 518.16 m (1,700.0 ft)	underground shaft, weapons development		40 kt			
Shave	January 22, 1969 15:00:00.04	PST (–8 hrs)	NTS Area U3gk 37.01544°N 115.99516°W	1,191 m (3,907 ft) – 240.75 m (789.9 ft)	underground shaft, weapons development		2 kt			
Vise	January 30, 1969 15:00:00.038	PST (–8 hrs)	NTS Area U3ej 37.0533°N 116.02998°W	1,204 m (3,950 ft) – 454.06 m (1,489.7 ft)	underground shaft, weapons development		20 kt			
Biggin	January 30, 1969 15:17:00.12	PST (–8 hrs)	NTS Area U9bz 37.13326°N 116.04113°W	1,257 m (4,124 ft) – 242.32 m (795.0 ft)	underground shaft, weapons development		less than 20 kt			
Nipper	February 4, 1969 15:00:00.04	PST (–8 hrs)	NTS Area U3gl 37.00262°N 116.01°W	1,178 m (3,865 ft) – 240.73 m (789.8 ft)	underground shaft, weapons development		less than 20 kt			
Winch	February 4, 1969 15:00:00.04	PST (–8 hrs)	NTS Area U3gf 37.00941°N 116.04304°W	1,185 m (3,888 ft) – 240.63 m (789.5 ft)	underground shaft, weapons development		600 t			
Cypress	February 12, 1969 16:18:20.88	PST (–8 hrs)	NTS Area U12g.09 37.16901°N 116.2116°W	2,265 m (7,431 ft) – 359.66 m (1,180.0 ft)	tunnel, weapon effect		15 kt			
Valise	March 18, 1969 14:30:00.12	PST (–8 hrs)	NTS Area U9by 37.13909°N 116.04171°W	1,261 m (4,137 ft) – 90.25 m (296.1 ft)	underground shaft, safety experiment		less than 20 kt	Venting detected		
Chatty	March 18, 1969 14:40:00.43	PST (–8 hrs)	NTS Area U2bn 37.16224°N 116.07679°W	1,312 m (4,304 ft) – 194.77 m (639.0 ft)	underground shaft, weapons development		800 t	Venting detected, 0.7 Ci (26 GBq)		
Barsac	March 20, 1969 18:12:00.04	PST (–8 hrs)	NTS Area U3gc 37.02203°N 116.03098°W	1,187 m (3,894 ft) – 304.13 m (997.8 ft)	underground shaft, weapons development		10 kt	Venting detected on site, 43 Ci (1,600 GBq)		
Coffer	March 21, 1969 14:30:00.41	PST (–8 hrs)	NTS Area U2de 37.13325°N 116.0876°W	1,291 m (4,236 ft) – 464.82 m (1,525.0 ft)	underground shaft, weapons development		26 kt	Venting detected, 10 Ci (370 GBq)		
Gourd-Amber - 1	April 24, 1969 13:04:00.14	PST (–8 hrs)	NTS Area U2bf 37.16393°N 116.08061°W	1,320 m (4,330 ft) – 181.3 m (595 ft)	underground shaft, weapons development		800 t			simultaneous, separate holes.
Gourd-Brown - 2	April 24, 1969 13:04:00.14	PST (–8 hrs)	NTS Area U2bl 37.15998°N 116.08186°W	1,317 m (4,321 ft) +	underground shaft, weapons development		less than 20 kt			simultaneous, separate holes.
Blenton	April 30, 1969 17:00:00.04	PST (–8 hrs)	NTS Area U7p 37.08145°N 116.01481°W	1,255 m (4,117 ft) – 557.73 m (1,829.8 ft)	underground shaft, weapons development		51 kt	Venting detected on site		
Thistle	April 30, 1969 17:00:00.04	PST (–8 hrs)	NTS Area U7t 37.09023°N 116.00651°W	1,281 m (4,203 ft) – 560.47 m (1,838.8 ft)	underground shaft, weapons development		38 kt			
Purse	May 7, 1969 13:45:00.04	PST (–8 hrs)	NTS Area U20v 37.28283°N 116.50153°W	1,828 m (5,997 ft) – 598.75 m (1,964.4 ft)	underground shaft, weapons development		90 kt			
Aliment	May 15, 1969 18:00:00.04	PST (–8 hrs)	NTS Area U2gj 37.01185°N 115.98583°W	1,207 m (3,960 ft) – 240.51 m (789.1 ft)	underground shaft, weapons development		2 kt			
Ipecac - 1	May 27, 1969 14:00:00.04	PST (–8 hrs)	NTS Area U3hka 37.01498°N 116.00292°W	1,181 m (3,875 ft) – 124.18 m (407.4 ft)	underground shaft, safety experiment		less than 20 kt	Venting detected on site		simultaneous, separate holes.
Ipecac - 2	May 27, 1969 14:00:00.04	PST (–8 hrs)	NTS Area U3hkb 37.01482°N 116.00086°W	1,182 m (3,878 ft) +	underground shaft, safety experiment		less than 20 kt	Venting detected on site		simultaneous, separate holes.
Torrido	May 27, 1969 14:15:00.04	PST (–8 hrs)	NTS Area U7w 37.07506°N 115.99617°W	1,270 m (4,170 ft) – 514.72 m (1,688.7 ft)	underground shaft, weapons development		22 kt			
Tapper	June 12, 1969 14:00:00.04	PST (–8 hrs)	NTS Area U3go 37.00879°N 116.03109°W	1,181 m (3,875 ft) – 303 m (994 ft)	underground shaft, weapons development		10 kt	Venting detected on site		
Bowl - 1	June 26, 1969 16:00:00.13	PST (–8 hrs)	NTS Area U2bo1 37.16244°N 116.07949°W	1,316 m (4,318 ft) – 198.12 m (650.0 ft)	underground shaft, weapons development		2 kt			simultaneous, separate holes.
Bowl - 2	June 26, 1969 16:00:00.13	PST (–8 hrs)	NTS Area U2bo2 37.16072°N 116.0801°W	1,315 m (4,314 ft) +	underground shaft, weapons development		3 kt			simultaneous, separate holes.
