= Flintlock (disambiguation) =

A flintlock is a kind of a firearm.

Flintlock may also refer to:

- Flintlock, a Joint Combined Exchange Training programme
- Flintlock (musical group), a 1970s pop group
- Flintlock mechanism, a firing mechanism
- Flintlock: The Siege of Dawn, a 2023 video game

== See also ==
- Operation Flintlock, a World War II campaign
- Operation Flintlock (nuclear test)
