= Operation Latchkey =

Series of 1960s US nuclear tests

Information
- Country: United States
- Test site: NTS Area 12, Rainier Mesa; NTS Area 19, 20, Pahute Mesa; NTS Areas 5, 11, Frenchman Flat; NTS, Areas 1–4, 6–10, Yucca Flat; Salmon Site, near Lumberton, Mississippi
- Period: 1966–1967
- Number of tests: 38
- Test type: underground shaft, tunnel
- Max. yield: 870 kilotonnes of TNT (3,600 TJ)

Test series chronology

Operation Latchkey was a series of 38 nuclear tests conducted by the United States in 1966–1967 at the Nevada Test Site. These tests followed the Operation Flintlock series and preceded the Operation Crosstie series.

== Nuclear tests ==
=== Persimmon ===
Persimmon included a vertical line-of-sight pipe fitted with a fast-acting closure. At the time of detonation, this vacuum pipe provided a pathway for neutrons from the nuclear device to travel to instruments in a tower located above the shot hole. A few seconds after detonation, these instruments and their samples were dragged out of the tower on a sled, before the subsidence crater formed and destroyed the tower.

== List of the nuclear tests ==
United States' Latchkey series tests and detonations
Name (Note: The US, France and Great Britain have code-named their test events, while the USSR and China did not, and therefore have only test numbers (with some exceptions – Soviet peaceful explosions were named). Word translations into English in parentheses unless the name is a proper noun. A dash followed by a number indicates a member of a salvo event. The US also sometimes named the individual explosions in such a salvo test, which results in "name1 – 1(with name2)". If test is canceled or aborted, then the row data like date and location discloses the intended plans, where known.)	Date time (UT)	Local time zone (Note: To convert the UT time into standard local, add the number of hours in parentheses to the UT time; for local daylight saving time, add one additional hour. If the result is earlier than 00:00, add 24 hours and subtract 1 from the day; if it is 24:00 or later, subtract 24 hours and add 1 to the day. All historical time zone data are derived from here:)	Location (Note: Rough place name and a latitude/longitude reference; for rocket-carried tests, the launch location is specified before the detonation location, if known. Some locations are extremely accurate; others (like airdrops and space blasts) may be quite inaccurate. "~" indicates a likely pro-forma rough location, shared with other tests in that same area.)	Elevation + height (Note: Elevation is the ground level at the point directly below the explosion relative to sea level; height is the additional distance added or subtracted by tower, balloon, shaft, tunnel, air drop or other contrivance. For rocket bursts the ground level is "N/A". In some cases it is not clear if the height is absolute or relative to ground, for example, Plumbbob/John. No number or units indicates the value is unknown, while "0" means zero. Sorting on this column is by elevation and height added together.)	Delivery (Note: Atmospheric, airdrop, balloon, gun, cruise missile, rocket, surface, tower, and barge are all disallowed by the Partial Nuclear Test Ban Treaty. Sealed shaft and tunnel are underground, and remained useful under the PTBT. Intentional cratering tests are borderline; they occurred under the treaty, were sometimes protested, and generally overlooked if the test was declared to be a peaceful use.) Purpose (Note: Include weapons development, weapon effects, safety test, transport safety test, war, science, joint verification and industrial/peaceful, which may be further broken down.)	Device (Note: Designations for test items where known, "?" indicates some uncertainty about the preceding value, nicknames for particular devices in quotes. This category of information is often not officially disclosed.)	Yield (Note: Estimated energy yield in tons, kilotons, and megatons. A ton of TNT equivalent is defined as 4.184 gigajoules (1 gigacalorie).)	Fallout (Note: Radioactive emission to the atmosphere aside from prompt neutrons, where known. The measured species is only iodine-131 if mentioned, otherwise it is all species. No entry means unknown, probably none if underground and "all" if not; otherwise notation for whether measured on the site only or off the site, where known, and the measured amount of radioactivity released.)	References	Notes
Saxon	July 28, 1966 15:33:30.13	PST (–8 hrs)	NTS Area U2cc 37.14044°N 116.13404°W	1,411 m (4,629 ft) – 153.04 m (502.1 ft)	underground shaft, peaceful research		1.2 kt	Venting detected, 0.5 Ci (19 GBq)		Project Plowshare - excavation device development.
Rovena	August 10, 1966 13:16:00.07	PST (–8 hrs)	NTS Area U10s 37.16864°N 116.04862°W	1,278 m (4,193 ft) – 195.25 m (640.6 ft)	underground shaft, weapons development		1 kt	Venting detected, 2 Ci (74 GBq)		
Tangerine	August 12, 1966 15:36:00.05	PST (–8 hrs)	NTS Area U3eb 37.04629°N 116.03007°W	1,199 m (3,934 ft) – 87.88 m (288.3 ft)	underground shaft, safety experiment		less than 20 kt			
Derringer	September 12, 1966 15:30:00.54	PST (–8 hrs)	NTS Area U5i 36.87595°N 115.95136°W	1,013 m (3,323 ft) – 255.12 m (837.0 ft)	underground shaft, weapon effect		7.8 kt	Venting detected off site, 12 kCi (440 TBq)		
Daiquiri	September 23, 1966 18:00:00.04	PST (–8 hrs)	NTS Area U7o 37.1033°N 116.03657°W	1,260 m (4,130 ft) – 561.15 m (1,841.0 ft)	underground shaft, weapons development		less than 20 kt			
Newark	September 29, 1966 14:45:30.09	PST (–8 hrs)	NTS Area U10u 37.16862°N 116.04693°W	1,279 m (4,196 ft) – 228.63 m (750.1 ft)	underground shaft, weapons development		4 kt	Venting detected, 290 Ci (11,000 GBq)		
Khaki	October 15, 1966 19:00:00.05	PST (–8 hrs)	NTS Area U3et 37.04704°N 116.01772°W	1,202 m (3,944 ft) – 232.55 m (763.0 ft)	underground shaft, weapons development		less than 20 kt			
Simms	November 5, 1966 14:45:00.0	PST (–8 hrs)	NTS Area U10w 37.1699°N 116.04809°W	1,279 m (4,196 ft) – 198.15 m (650.1 ft)	underground shaft, peaceful research		2.3 kt	Venting detected, 11 Ci (410 GBq)		Plowshare - evaluate clean nuclear explosives for excavation.
Ajax	November 11, 1966 12:00:00.14	PST (–8 hrs)	NTS Area U9al 37.13449°N 116.05095°W	1,254 m (4,114 ft) – 238.45 m (782.3 ft)	underground shaft, weapons development		5 kt	Venting detected on site, 1 Ci (37 GBq)		
Cerise	November 18, 1966 15:02:00.04	PST (–8 hrs)	NTS Area U3eu 37.04273°N 116.0113°W	1,202 m (3,944 ft) – 211.09 m (692.6 ft)	underground shaft, weapons development		7 kt	I-131 venting detected, 0		
Vigil	November 22, 1966 15:00:00.13	PST (–8 hrs)	NTS Area U10ad 37.16934°N 116.04918°W	1,278 m (4,193 ft) – 93.68 m (307.3 ft)	underground shaft, safety experiment		less than 20 kt	Venting detected on site, 0.0014 Ci (0.052 GBq)		
Sterling	December 3, 1966 12:15:00.05	CST (–6 hrs)	Salmon Site, near Lumberton, Mississippi 31.14229°N 89.57001°W	74 m (243 ft) – 830 m (2,720 ft)	underground shaft, joint verification		380 t			Project Vela Uniform/Dribble. Exploded inside the cavity created by Whetstone/Salmon in Tatum salt dome.
Sidecar	December 13, 1966 17:50:00.04	PST (–8 hrs)	NTS Area U3ez 37.03478°N 116.00751°W	1,195 m (3,921 ft) – 240.27 m (788.3 ft)	underground shaft, weapons development		1 kt	Venting detected on site, 0.041 Ci (1.5 GBq)		
New Point	December 13, 1966 21:00:00.08	PST (–8 hrs)	NTS Area U11c 36.8772°N 115.93875°W	1,003 m (3,291 ft) – 243.84 m (800.0 ft)	underground shaft, weapon effect		7 kt	Venting detected on site, 3 Ci (110 GBq)		
Greeley	December 20, 1966 15:30:00.08	PST (–8 hrs)	NTS Area U20g - 37.30231°N 116.40966°W	1,945 m (6,381 ft) – 1,214.63 m (3,985.0 ft)	underground shaft, weapons development		870 kt			Test of Spartan warhead (W71).
Rivet 1	January 18, 1967 14:55:00.0	PST (–8 hrs)	NTS Area U10aa 37.16507°N 116.04742°W	1,276 m (4,186 ft) – 152.1 m (499 ft)	underground shaft, weapons development		150 t			
Nash	January 19, 1967 16:45:00.14	PST (–8 hrs)	NTS Area U2ce 37.1437°N 116.13619°W	1,425 m (4,675 ft) – 363.78 m (1,193.5 ft)	underground shaft, weapons development		39 kt	Venting detected off site, 69 kCi (2,600 TBq)		
Bourbon	January 20, 1967 17:40:04.41	PST (–8 hrs)	NTS Area U7n 37.09981°N 116.0047°W	1,306 m (4,285 ft) – 559.72 m (1,836.4 ft)	underground shaft, weapons development		41 kt			
Rivet 2	January 26, 1967 16:30:00.0	PST (–8 hrs)	NTS Area U10z 37.16475°N 116.04893°W	1,274 m (4,180 ft) – 197.78 m (648.9 ft)	underground shaft, weapons development		800 t	Venting detected on site, 0.1 Ci (3.7 GBq)		
Ward	February 8, 1967 15:15:00.13	PST (–8 hrs)	NTS Area U10x 37.16748°N 116.04801°W	1,277 m (4,190 ft) – 257.25 m (844.0 ft)	underground shaft, weapons development		11 kt			
Persimmon	February 23, 1967 18:34:00.04	PST (–8 hrs)	NTS Area U3dn 37.01756°N 116.01662°W	1,184 m (3,885 ft) – 299.11 m (981.3 ft)	underground shaft, weapons development		4 kt			
Agile	February 23, 1967 18:50:00.13	PST (–8 hrs)	NTS Area U2v 37.12681°N 116.06726°W	1,270 m (4,170 ft) – 731.52 m (2,400.0 ft)	underground shaft, weapons development		200 kt			
Rivet 3	March 2, 1967 15:00:00.0	PST (–8 hrs)	NTS Area U10y 37.16581°N 116.04957°W	1,275 m (4,183 ft) – 271.27 m (890.0 ft)	underground shaft, weapons development		2.5 kt	Venting detected		
Mushroom	March 3, 1967 15:19:00.04	PST (–8 hrs)	NTS Area U3ef 37.03946°N 116.01093°W	1,198 m (3,930 ft) – 179.55 m (589.1 ft)	underground shaft, weapons development		600 t	Venting detected on site, 0.4 Ci (15 GBq)		
Fizz	March 10, 1967 15:00:00.04	PST (–8 hrs)	NTS Area U3fr 37.04612°N 116.03073°W	1,199 m (3,934 ft) – 117.73 m (386.3 ft)	underground shaft, safety experiment		less than 20 kt			
Oakland	April 4, 1967 14:20:00.15	PST (–8 hrs)	NTS Area U2bi 37.16195°N 116.08313°W	1,321 m (4,334 ft) – 165.35 m (542.5 ft)	underground shaft, weapons development		less than 20 kt	Venting detected, 100 Ci (3,700 GBq)		
Heilman	April 6, 1967 15:00:00.12	PST (–8 hrs)	NTS Area U2cg 37.13728°N 116.13355°W	1,405 m (4,610 ft) – 152.7 m (501 ft)	underground shaft, weapons development		less than 20 kt	Venting detected on site, 8 Ci (300 GBq)		
Fawn	April 7, 1967 15:00:00.04	PST (–8 hrs)	NTS Area U3eo 37.05439°N 116.02296°W	1,206 m (3,957 ft) – 271.06 m (889.3 ft)	underground shaft, weapons development		1 kt			
Chocolate	April 21, 1967 15:09:00.04	PST (–8 hrs)	NTS Area U3es 37.01928°N 116.03818°W	1,186 m (3,891 ft) – 240.45 m (788.9 ft)	underground shaft, weapons development		7 kt			
Effendi	April 27, 1967 14:45:00.0	PST (–8 hrs)	NTS Area U2ap 37.13873°N 116.06407°W	1,279 m (4,196 ft) – 219.29 m (719.5 ft)	underground shaft, weapons development		800 t			
Mickey	May 10, 1967 13:40:00.041	PST (–8 hrs)	NTS Area U7m 37.07781°N 115.99617°W	1,278 m (4,193 ft) – 499.63 m (1,639.2 ft)	underground shaft, weapons development		22 kt			
Commodore	May 20, 1967 15:00:00.2	PST (–8 hrs)	NTS Area U2am 37.13011°N 116.0652°W	1,271 m (4,170 ft) – 746.46 m (2,449.0 ft)	underground shaft, weapons development		250 kt	Venting detected, less than 1 Ci (37 GBq)		
Scotch	May 23, 1967 14:00:00.04	PST (–8 hrs)	NTS Area U19as 37.27503°N 116.37086°W	2,034 m (6,673 ft) – 977.39 m (3,206.7 ft)	underground shaft, weapons development		155 kt			
Absinthe	May 26, 1967 12:30:00.03	PST (–8 hrs)	NTS Area U3ep 37.045°N 116.01979°W	1,199 m (3,934 ft) – 118.65 m (389.3 ft)	underground shaft, safety experiment		less than 20 kt			
Knickerbocker	May 26, 1967 15:00:01.5	PST (–8 hrs)	NTS Area U20d 37.24789°N 116.48106°W	1,878 m (6,161 ft) – 630.63 m (2,069.0 ft)	underground shaft, weapons development		76 kt	Venting detected, 110 Ci (4,100 GBq)		
Switch	June 22, 1967 13:10:00.0	PST (–8 hrs)	NTS Area U9bv 37.12551°N 116.02954°W	1,277 m (4,190 ft) – 301.75 m (990.0 ft)	underground shaft, peaceful research		3.1 kt	Venting detected off site, less than 1 Ci (37 GBq)		Project Plowshare - evaluate clean nuclear explosives for excavation.
Midi Mist	June 26, 1967 16:00:00.08	PST (–8 hrs)	NTS Area U12n.02 37.20206°N 116.20871°W	2,200 m (7,200 ft) – 374.9 m (1,230 ft)	tunnel, weapon effect		20 kt	Venting detected, 4.5 kCi (170 TBq)		
Umber	June 29, 1967 11:25:00.04	PST (–8 hrs)	NTS Area U3em 37.02849°N 116.0233°W	1,188 m (3,898 ft) – 310.24 m (1,017.8 ft)	underground shaft, weapon effect		10 kt	Venting detected off site, 26 kCi (960 TBq)		
