= Operation Flintlock =

Operation Flintlock may refer to:

- Operation Flintlock (nuclear test), a nuclear test series on the Nevada Test Site
- Operation Flintlock (World War II), a U.S. military campaign in the Gilbert and Marshall Islands during World War II in the Pacific
