= Project Thunderbird =

Coordinates: 44°10′00″N 105°55′00″W

Project Thunderbird was a 1967 United States Atomic Energy Commission (AEC) proposal to use nuclear explosives to prepare coalbeds to gasify coal in place underground in Wyoming. The project was proposed as a component of Project Plowshare, which sought ways to use nuclear devices in public works and industrial development projects. The project aimed to exploit deep coal deposits to gasify them in situ with controlled combustion in the rubble chimney resulting from a deep nuclear detonation. The project was to be located on the border of Johnson County and Campbell County, about 20 miles (32 km) west of Gillette, Wyoming, in the Powder River Basin.

While initial reports on the project were optimistic, subsequent analysis cast doubt on the project's viability, and the project was not pursued.

== Proposal ==
In 1966-67, the U.S. Atomic Energy Commission was approached by Wyoming coal engineers Wold and Jenkins, of Casper, Wyoming, with the idea of extending Project Plowshare programs for the development of natural gas production using nuclear devices into coalbed areas. The project was received with interest, and was named Project Thunderbird. The Lawrence Radiation Laboratory (LRL), which administered many Plowshare programs, initiated a study to define a potential demonstration project in 1968.

The project was intended to investigate the possibility of enhancing the economic value of deeply-buried coalbeds in the Powder River Basin that could not easily be exploited by the strip mining methods used father east, where the beds approached the surface.

== Project description ==
The project was intended to demonstrate techniques for creating a so-call "rubble chimney," a subterranean cavity, containing broken rubble and voids. Following the nuclear explosion that created the chimney, wells would be drilled to introduce oxygen and extract gas products. The pulverized coal would be ignited and fed oxygen under controlled conditions, converting the coal into combustible gas. In effect, the cavity would become a coking oven, driving off the volatile components of coal and leaving the residual carbon coke in the ground.

The project was proposed for deep coalbeds in the Fort Union-Wasatch Formation. The Roland coalbed, which was being surface mined at the Wyodak Mine 25 miles (40 km) to the east, lies at depths of 1,000 feet (300 m) or more at the Thunderbird project site, at thicknesses of up to 300 feet (91 m).

Two possible project scopes were described. A 50-kiloton explosion was expected to create a chimney 127 feet (39 m) in radius and 635 feet (194 m) high, containing about 2,000,000 short tons (1,800,000 t) of broken rock. About 25 percent of the contents of the cavity would be coal, which could produce the equivalent of about 1.5 million barrels of oil. A second proposal suggested a one-megaton explosion that was expected to create a chimney with a 310-foot (94 m) radius and a height of 1,200 feet (370 m). This would contain seven times as much coal, and would fracture the coal beds for a greater distance beyond the chimney, with a further 10%-50% increase in gas yield. Gas from the wellhead would be processed by the Fischer-Tropsch process into gas and petroleum products. Existing gas and oil pipeline infrastructure would move the products to market.

14 test borings were made on Wold and Jenkins leases. No other exploration has been documented, and the area has in subsequent years been extensively investigated and drilled for gas projects.

== Outcome ==
Wold and Jenkins engineers viewed the project as potentially economically viable. A 1969 analysis by Gibbs & Hill, Inc. was less optimistic, advising the LRL that assumptions concerning development costs versus production did not yield a viable project. This opinion appears to have halted the project. No specific location for the test was identified.
