= Vela Uniform =

Element of Project Vela

Vela Uniform was an element of Project Vela conducted jointly by the United States Department of Energy and the Advanced Research Projects Agency. Its purpose was to develop seismic methods for detecting underground nuclear testing, and it involved many experts from academia, the sponsoring military agencies and the Atomic Energy Commission.

Vela Uniform incorporated seven underground nuclear tests in the continental United States and Alaska from October 1963 to July 1971. Seismic traces from multiple locations were analyzed for each of these events to develop methods for differentiating underground nuclear tests from other seismic events (such as earthquakes) and locating the test site. The program also involved numerous experiments using conventional high explosives.

== Vela Uniform tests ==
Vela Uniform test blasts
Test name	Date	Location	Yield	Test series
Shoal	1963-10-26	Sand Springs Range 39.20012°N 118.38124°W	12 kt	Niblick
Salmon	1964-10-22	Salmon Site 31.14229°N 89.57001°W	5.3 kt	Whetstone
Long Shot	1965-10-29	Amchitka Island, Alaska 51.43709°N 179.18032°E	80 kt	Flintlock
Sterling	1966-12-03	Salmon Site 31.14229°N 89.57001°W	380 t	Latchkey
Scroll	1968-04-23	Nevada Test Site 37.33767°N 116.37647°W	< 20 kt	Crosstie
Diamond Dust	1970-05-12	Nevada Test Site 37.0104°N 116.20277°W	< 20 kt	Mandrel
Diamond Mine	1971-07-01	Nevada Test Site 37.01148°N 116.20427°W	< 20 kt	Grommet

== Reference sources ==
- "United States Nuclear Tests, July 1945 to 31 December 1992" (NWD 94–1), Robert Standish Norris and Thomas B. Cochran, Nuclear Weapons Databook, Working Papers, Natural Resources Defense Council, 1350 New York Avenue, N.W., Suite 300, Washington, DC 20005, 202-783-7800, 1 February 1994.
- "Nuclear Explosions and Earthquakes: The Parted Veil," Bruce A. Bolt, W. H. Freeman and Company, San Francisco, 1976, ISBN 0-7167-0276-2.
