= Project Plowshare =

U.S. program examining the peaceful applications of nuclear explosives (1961–1977)

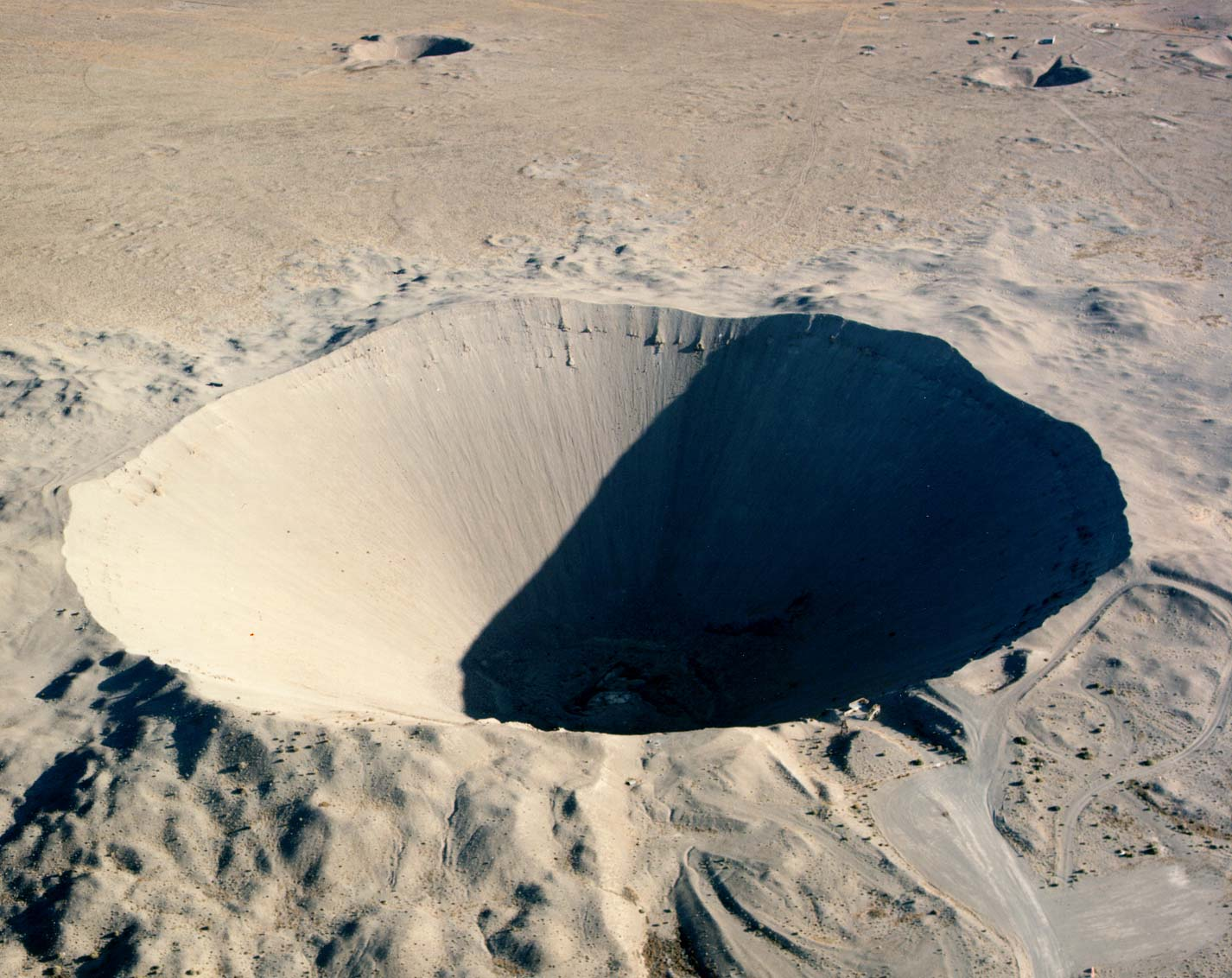
The 1962 "Sedan" plowshares shot displaced 12 million tons of earth and created a crater 320 feet (98 m) deep and 1,280 feet (390 m) wide.

Project Plowshare was the overall United States program for the development of techniques to use nuclear explosives and large non-nuclear explosions for peaceful construction purposes. The program was organized in June 1957 as part of the worldwide Atoms for Peace efforts. As part of the program, 35 nuclear warheads were detonated in 27 separate tests. A similar program was carried out in the Soviet Union under the name Nuclear Explosions for the National Economy, although the Soviet program consisted of 124 tests.

Successful demonstrations of non-combat uses for nuclear explosives include rock blasting, stimulation of tight gas, chemical element manufacture, (Note: Test shot Anacostia resulted in Curium-250 being discovered.) unlocking some of the mysteries of the R-process of stellar nucleosynthesis and probing the composition of the Earth's deep crust, creating reflection seismology vibroseis data which has helped geologists and follow-on mining company prospecting.

The project's uncharacteristically large and atmospherically vented Sedan nuclear test also helped geologists to determine that Barringer crater was formed as a result of a meteor impact and not from a volcanic eruption, as had earlier been assumed. This became the first crater on Earth definitely proven to be from an impact event.

Negative impacts from Project Plowshare's tests generated significant public opposition, which eventually led to the program's termination in 1977. These consequences included tritiated water (projected to increase by CER Geonuclear Corporation to a level of 2% of the then-maximum level for drinking water) and the deposition of fallout from radioactive material being injected into the atmosphere before underground testing was mandated by treaty.

== Rationale ==
By exploiting the peaceful uses of the "friendly atom" in medical applications, earth removal, and later in nuclear power plants, the nuclear industry and government sought to allay public fears about nuclear technology and promote the acceptance of nuclear weapons. At the peak of the Atomic Age, the United States Federal government initiated Project Plowshare, involving "peaceful nuclear explosions". The United States Atomic Energy Commission chairman at the time, Lewis Strauss, announced that the Plowshares project was intended to "highlight the peaceful applications of nuclear explosive devices and thereby create a climate of world opinion that is more favorable to weapons development and tests". These tests were to demonstrate that atomic bombs can be used for peaceful purposes, that the atomic sword could be beaten into a plowshare.

== Proposals ==
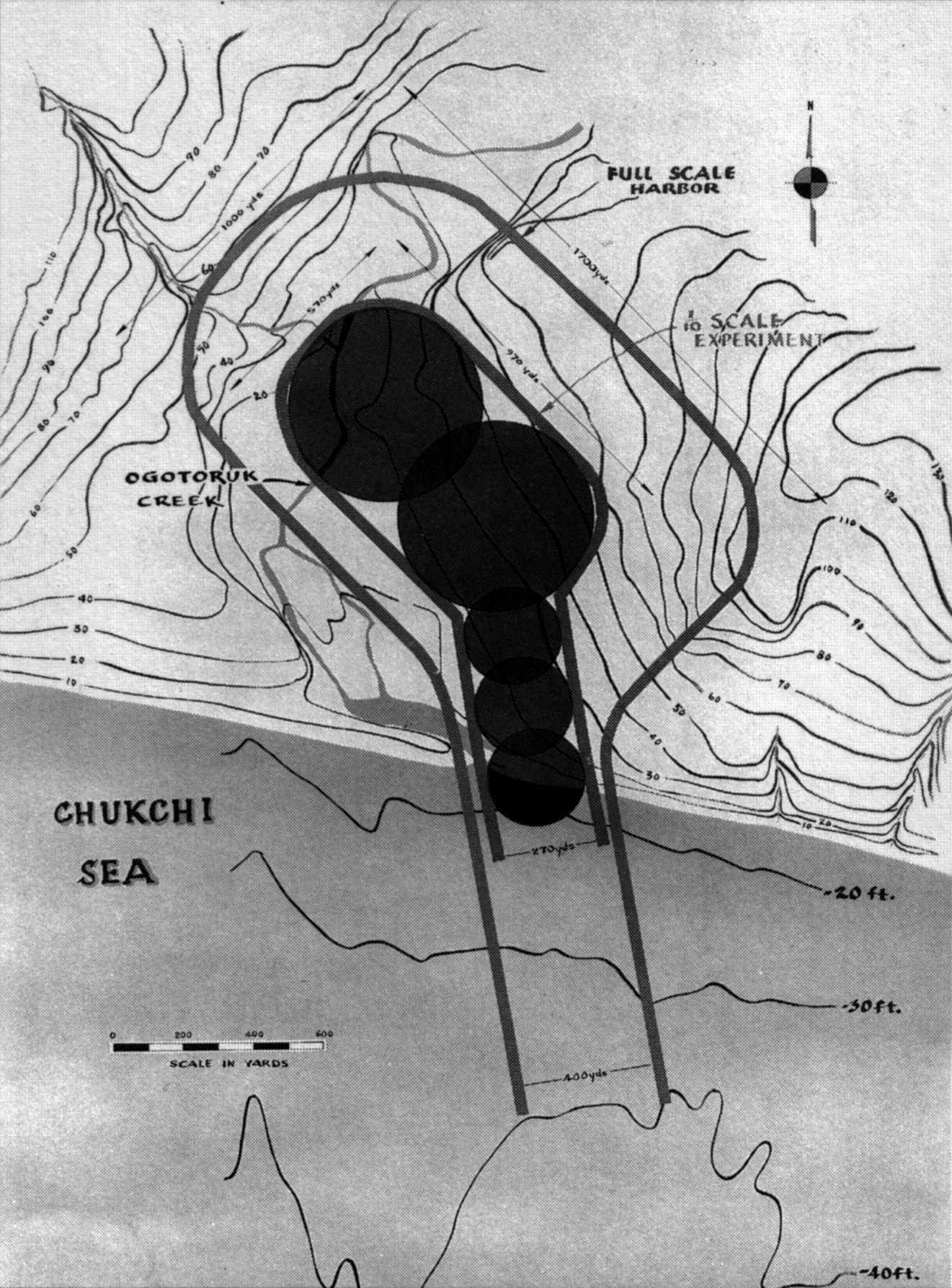
One of the Chariot schemes involved chaining five thermonuclear devices to create an artificial harbor.

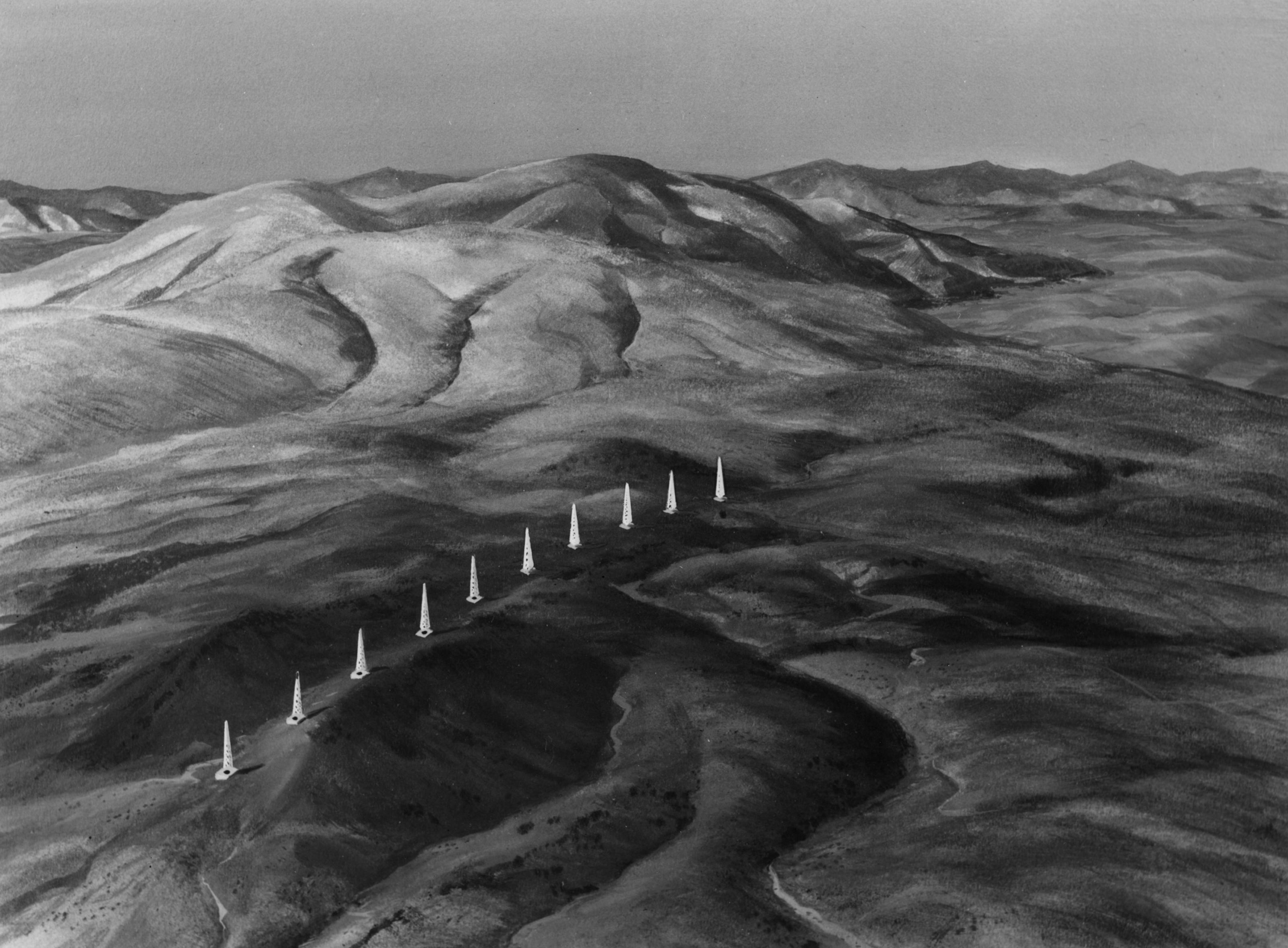
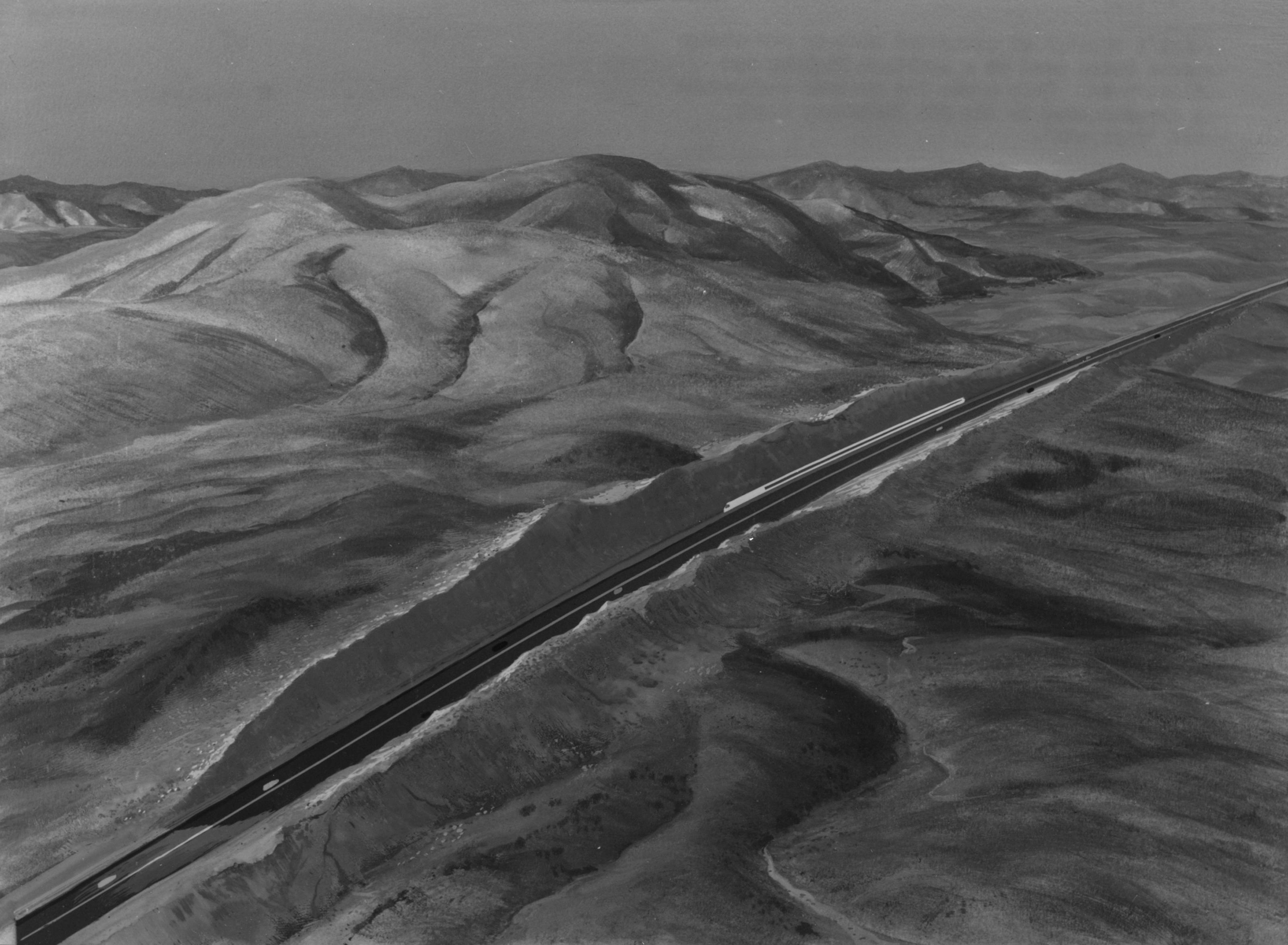
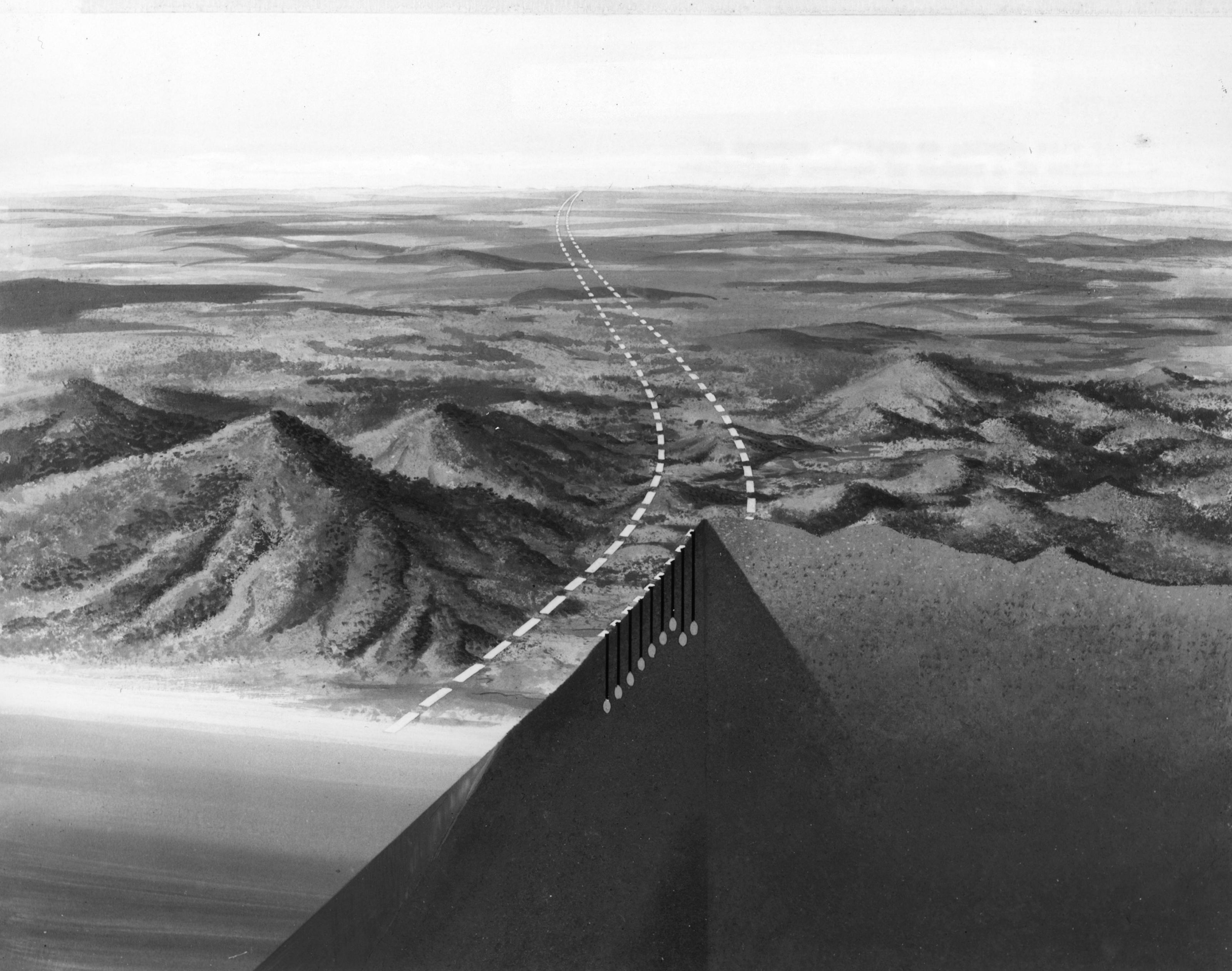
Artist concepts for Plowshare's proposed road, rail, and canal route excavation.

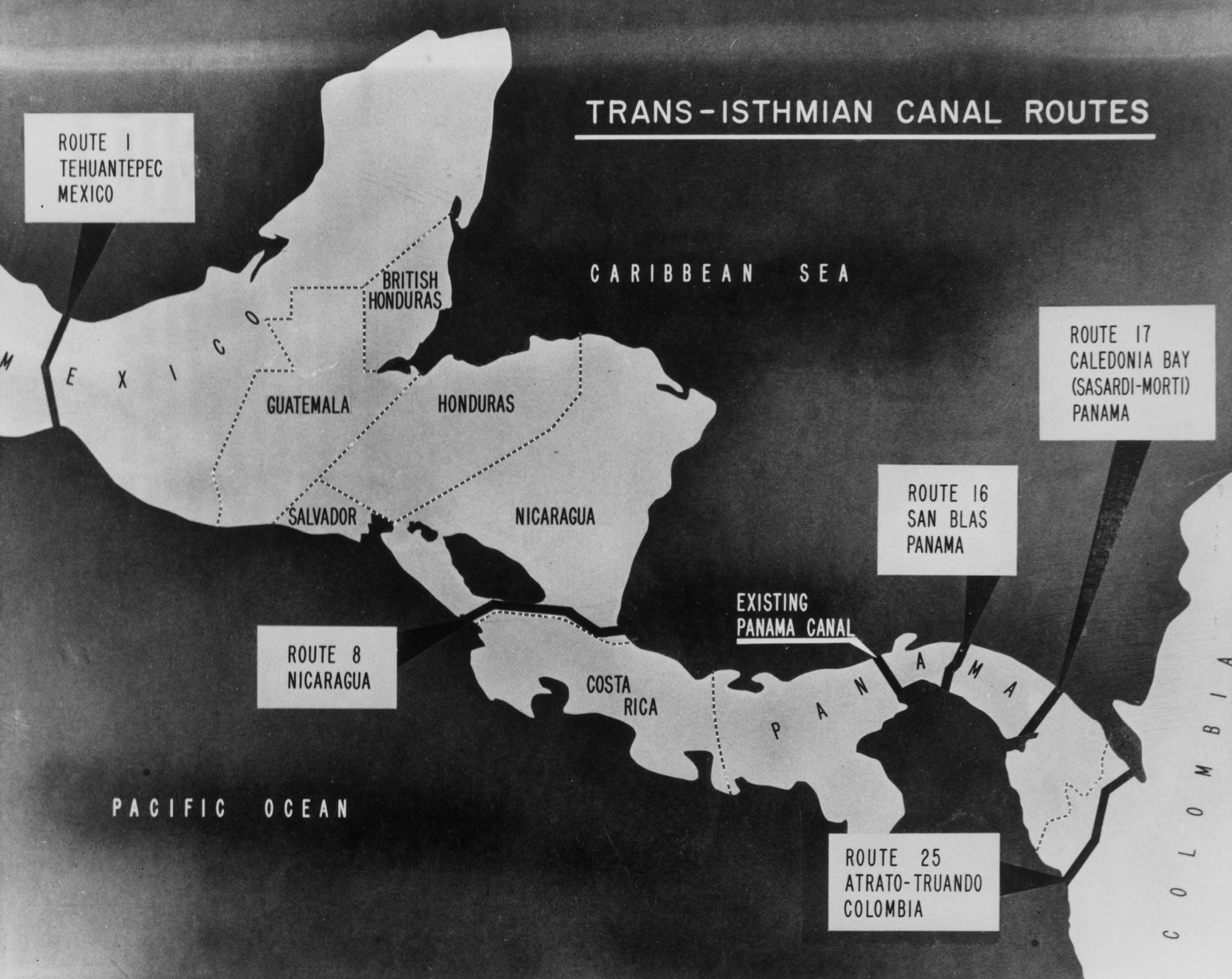
Plowshare's proposed canals near the Panama Canal.

Proposed uses for nuclear explosives under Project Plowshare included widening the Panama Canal, constructing a new sea-level waterway through Nicaragua nicknamed the Pan-Atomic Canal, cutting paths through mountainous areas for highways, and connecting inland river systems. Other proposals involved blasting caverns for water, natural gas, and petroleum storage. Serious consideration was also given to using these explosives for various mining operations. One proposal suggested using nuclear blasts to connect underground aquifers in Arizona. Another plan involved surface blasting on the western slope of California's Sacramento Valley for a water transport project.

One of the first serious cratering proposals that came close to being carried out was Project Chariot, which would have used several hydrogen bombs to create an artificial harbor at Cape Thompson, Alaska. It was never carried out due to concerns for the native populations and the fact that there was little potential use for the harbor to justify its risk and expense.

Project Carryall, proposed in 1963 by the Atomic Energy Commission, the California Division of Highways (now Caltrans), and the Santa Fe Railway, would have used 22 nuclear explosions to excavate a massive roadcut through the Bristol Mountains in the Mojave Desert, to accommodate construction of Interstate 40 and a new rail line.

A project proposed in a 1963 memorandum by Lawrence Livermore National Laboratory would have used 520 2-megaton nuclear explosions to excavate a canal through the Negev Desert in Israel at an estimated cost of $575 million ($5 billion in 2021), to serve as an alternative route to the Suez Canal.

At the end of the program, a major objective was to develop nuclear explosives, and blast techniques, for stimulating the flow of natural gas in "tight" underground reservoir formations. In the 1960s, a proposal was suggested for a modified in situ shale oil extraction process which involved creation of a rubble chimney (a zone in the oil shale formation created by breaking the rock into fragments) using a nuclear explosive. However, this approach was abandoned for a number of technical reasons.

=== Nuclear weapon designs ===
For gas stimulation shots, one problem was extreme conditions. They needed a device with a small diameter on the order of 9 inches (23 cm) that could withstand extended periods at 350 °F (177 °C) without refrigeration. Another major problem was "residual tritium". The Rulison shot used an expensive fission explosive. The Miniata shot tested a cheaper and smaller (9 inch diameter) "minimum residual tritium" design device known as Diamond. Notably, Los Alamos Scientific Laboratory also proposed a 9 inch "tritium free" device that would use proton-boron fusion to strongly limit the neutron radiation produced.

== Plowshare testing ==
The first Peaceful Nuclear Explosion (PNE) blast was Project Gnome, conducted on December 10, 1961, in a salt bed 24 mi (39 km) southeast of Carlsbad, in southeast New Mexico. The explosion released 3.1 kilotons (13 TJ) of energy yield at a depth of 1,184 ft (361 m) which resulted in the formation of a 170 ft (52 m) diameter, 80 ft (24 m) high cavity. The test had many objectives, the most public of which involved the generation of steam which could then be used to generate electricity. Another objective was the production of useful radioisotopes and their recovery. Yet another experiment involved neutron time-of-flight physics, and a fourth experiment involved geophysical studies based upon the timed seismic source. Only the last objective was considered a complete success. The blast unintentionally vented radioactive steam while the press watched. The partly developed Project Coach detonation experiment that was to follow adjacent to the Gnome test was then canceled.

A number of proof-of-concept cratering blasts were conducted; including the Buggy shot of five 1-kiloton devices for a channel/trench in Area 30 and the largest being 104 kiloton (435 terajoule) on July 6, 1962, at the north end of Yucca Flats, within the Atomic Energy Commission's Nevada Test Site (NTS) in southern Nevada. The shot, "Sedan", displaced more than 12 million short tons (11,000 million kilograms) of soil and resulted in a radioactive cloud that rose to an altitude of 12,000 ft (3.7 km). The radioactive dust plume headed northeast and then east towards the Mississippi River.

Over the next 11 years, 26 more nuclear explosion tests were conducted under the United States PNE program. The radioactive blast debris from 839 U.S. underground nuclear test explosions remain buried in-place and have been judged impractical to remove by the DOE's Nevada Site Office. Funding quietly ended in 1997, and costs for the program have been estimated at more than (US) $770 million.

=== Natural gas stimulation experiment ===
Three nuclear explosion experiments were intended to stimulate the flow of natural gas from "tight" formation gas fields. Industrial participants included El Paso Natural Gas Company for the Gasbuggy test near Farmington, New Mexico; CER Geonuclear Corporation and Austral Oil Company for the Rulison, Colorado test; and CER Geonuclear Corporation for the Rio Blanco test.

The final PNE blast took place on May 17, 1973, under Fawn Creek, 47.5 mi (76.4 km) north of Grand Junction, Colorado. Three 30-kiloton detonations took place simultaneously at depths of 5,768, 6,152 and 6,611 ft (1,758, 1,875 and 2,015 m). If it had been successful, plans called for the use of hundreds of specialized nuclear explosives in the western Rockies gas fields. The previous two tests had indicated that the produced natural gas would be too radioactive for safe use; the Rio Blanco test found that the three blast cavities had not connected as hoped, and the resulting gas still contained unacceptable levels of radionuclides.

By 1974, approximately $82 million had been invested in the nuclear gas stimulation technology program. It was estimated that even after 25 years of production of all the natural gas deemed recoverable, only 15 to 40% of the investment would be recouped. Also, the concept that stove burners in California might soon emit trace amounts of blast radionuclides into family homes did not sit well with the general public. The contaminated gas was never channeled into commercial supply lines.

The situation remained so for the next three decades, but a resurgence in Colorado Western slope natural gas drilling has brought resource development closer and closer to the original underground detonations. By mid-2009, 84 drilling permits had been issued within a 3-mile (4.8 km) radius, with 11 permits within one mi (1.6 km) mile of the site.

== Impacts, opposition and economics ==
Operation Plowshare "started with great expectations and high hopes". Planners believed that the projects could be completed safely, but there was less confidence that they could be completed more economically than conventional methods. Moreover, there was insufficient public and Congressional support for the projects. Projects Chariot and Coach were two examples where technical problems and environmental concerns prompted further feasibility studies which took several years, and each project was eventually canceled.

Citizen groups voiced concerns and opposition to some of the Plowshare tests. There were concerns that the blast effects from the Schooner explosion could dry up active wells or trigger an earthquake. There was opposition to both Rulison and Rio Blanco tests because of possible radioactive gas flaring operations and other environmental hazards. In a 1973 article, Time used the term "Project Dubious" to describe Operation Plowshare.

There were negative impacts from several of Project Plowshare’s 27 nuclear explosions, primarily those conducted in the project's infancy and those that were very high in explosive yield.

On Project Gnome and the Sedan test:

Project Gnome vented radioactive steam over the very press gallery that was called to confirm its safety. The next blast, a 104-kiloton detonation at Yucca Flat, Nevada, displaced 12 million tons of soil and resulted in a radioactive dust cloud that rose 12,000 feet [3,700 m] and plumed toward the Mississippi River. Other consequences – blighted land, relocated communities, tritium-contaminated water, radioactivity, and fallout from debris being hurled high into the atmosphere – were ignored and downplayed until the program was terminated in 1977, due in large part to public opposition.

Project Plowshare shows how something intended to improve national security can unwittingly do the opposite if it fails to fully consider the social, political, and environmental consequences. It also “underscores that public resentment and opposition can stop projects in their tracks”.

United States and Soviet Union/Russia nuclear stockpiles. The slow down in the production of nuclear weapons, beginning in the late 1970s in the US, greatly impacted on the economic calculations of peaceful uses of nuclear detonations.

The social scientist Benjamin Sovacool contends that the main problem with oil and gas stimulation, which many considered the most promising economic use of nuclear detonations, was that the produced oil and gas was radioactive, which caused consumers to reject it and this was ultimately the program's downfall. Oil and gas are sometimes naturally radioactive to begin with, however, and the industry is set up to deal with oil and gas that contain radioactive contaminants. Historian Dr. Michael Payne notes that it was primarily changing public opinion, in response to events such as the Cuban Missile Crisis, that drove the protests, court cases and general hostility that ended the oil and gas stimulation efforts. Furthermore, as the years went by without further development and production of nuclear weapons slowed, interest in peaceful applications waned in the 1950s–60s. Cheaper, non-nuclear stimulation techniques suitable for most US gas fields were developed in the following years.

As a point of comparison, the most successful and profitable nuclear stimulation effort that did not result in customer product contamination issues was the 1976 Project Neva on the Sredne-Botuobinsk gas field in the Soviet Union, made possible by multiple cleaner stimulation explosives, favorable rock strata and the possible creation of an underground contaminant storage cavity. The Soviet Union retains the record for the cleanest/lowest fission-fraction nuclear devices so far demonstrated.

The public records for devices that produced the highest proportion of their yield via fusion-only reactions, and therefore created orders of magnitude smaller amounts of long-lived fission products as a result, are the USSR's Peaceful nuclear explosions of the 1970s, with the three detonations that excavated part of Pechora–Kama Canal, being cited as 98% fusion each in the Taiga test's three 15-kiloton explosive yield devices, that is, a total fission fraction of 0.3 kilotons in a 15 kt device. In comparison, the next three high fusion-yielding devices were all much too high in total explosive yield for oil and gas stimulation: the 50-megaton Tsar Bomba achieved a yield 97% derived from fusion, while in the US, the 9.3-megaton Hardtack Poplar test is reported as 95.2%, and the 4.5-megaton Redwing Navajo test as 95% derived from fusion.

== Nuclear tests ==
The U.S. conducted 27 PNE shots in conjunction with other, weapons-related, test series. A report by the Federation of American Scientists includes yields slightly different from those presented below.

Plowshare nuclear tests
Test name	Date	Location	Type	Depth of Burial	Medium	Yield (kilotons)	Test series	Objective
Gnome	December 10, 1961	Carlsbad, New Mexico	Shaft	1,185 ft (361 m)	Salt	3	Nougat	A multipurpose experiment designed to provide data concerning: (1) heat generated from a nuclear explosion; (2) isotopes production; (3) neutron physics; (4) seismic measurements in a salt medium; and (5) design data for developing nuclear devices specifically for peaceful uses.
Sedan	July 6, 1962	Nevada Test Site	Crater	635 ft (194 m)	Alluvium	104	Storax	An excavation experiment in alluvium to determine feasibility of using nuclear explosions for large excavation projects, such as harbors and canals; provide data on crater size, radiological safety, seismic effects, and air blast.
Anacostia	November 27, 1962	Nevada Test Site	Shaft	747 ft (227.7 m)	Tuff	5.2	Storax	A device-development experiment to produce heavy elements and provide radiochemical analysis data for the planned Coach Project.
Kaweah	February 21, 1963	Nevada Test Site	Shaft	745 ft (227.1 m)	Alluvium	3	Dominic I and II	A device-development experiment to produce heavy elements and provide technical data for the planned Coach Project.
Tornillo	October 11, 1963	Nevada Test Site	Shaft	489 ft (149 m)	Alluvium	0.38	Niblick	A device-development experiment to produce a clean nuclear explosive for excavation applications.
Klickitat	February 20, 1964	Nevada Test Site	Shaft	1,616 ft (492.6 m)	Tuff	70	Niblick	A device-development experiment to produce an improved nuclear explosive for excavation applications.
Ace	June 11, 1964	Nevada Test Site	Shaft	862 ft (262.7 m)	Alluvium	3	Niblick	A device-development experiment to produce an improved nuclear explosive for excavation applications.
Dub	June 30, 1964	Nevada Test Site	Shaft	848 ft (258.5 m)	Alluvium	11.7	Niblick	A device-development experiment to study emplacement techniques.
Par	October 9, 1964	Nevada Test Site	Shaft	1,325 ft (403.9 m)	Alluvium	38	Whetstone	A device-development experiment designed to increase the neutron flux needed for the creation of heavy elements.
Handcar	November 5, 1964	Nevada Test Site	Shaft	1,332 ft (406 m)	Dolomite (carbonate rock)	12	Whetstone	An emplacement experiment to study the effects of nuclear explosions in carbonate rock.
Sulky	November 5, 1964	Nevada Test Site	Shaft	90 ft (27.4 m)	Basalt	0.9	Whetstone	An excavation experiment to explore cratering mechanics in hard, dry rock and study dispersion patterns of airborne radionuclides released under these conditions.
Palanquin	April 14, 1965	Nevada Test Site	Crater	280 ft (85.3 m)	Rhyolite	4.3	Whetstone	An excavation experiment in hard, dry rock to study dispersion patterns of airborne radionuclides released under these conditions.
Templar	March 24, 1966	Nevada Test Site	Shaft	495 ft (150.9 m)	Tuff	0.37	Flintlock	To develop an improved nuclear explosive for excavation applications.
Vulcan	June 25, 1966	Nevada Test Site	Shaft	1,057 ft (322.2 m)	Alluvium	25	Flintlock	A heavy element device-development test to evaluate neutron flux performance.
Saxon	July 11, 1966	Nevada Test Site	Shaft	502 ft (153 m)	Tuff	1.2	Latchkey	A device-development experiment to improve nuclear explosives for excavation applications.
Simms	November 6, 1966	Nevada Test Site	Shaft	650 ft (198.1 m)	Alluvium	2.3	Latchkey	A device-development experiment to evaluate clean nuclear explosives for excavation applications.
Switch	June 22, 1967	Nevada Test Site	Shaft	990 ft (301.8 m)	Tuff	3.1	Latchkey	A device-development experiment to evaluate clean nuclear explosives for excavation applications.
Marvel	September 21, 1967	Nevada Test Site	Shaft	572 ft (174.3 m)	Alluvium	2.2	Crosstie	An emplacement experiment to investigate underground phenomenology related to emplacement techniques.
Gasbuggy	December 10, 1967	Farmington, New Mexico	Shaft	4,240 ft (1,292 m)	Sandstone, gas bearing formation	29	Crosstie	A gas stimulation experiment to investigate the feasibility of using nuclear explosives to stimulate a low-permeability gas field; first Plowshare joint government-industry nuclear experiment to evaluate an industrial application.
Cabriolet	January 26, 1968	Nevada Test Site	Crater	170 ft (51.8 m)	Rhyolite	2.3	Crosstie	An excavation experiment to explore cratering mechanics in hard, dry rock and study dispersion patterns of airborne radionuclides released under these conditions.
Buggy	March 12, 1968	Nevada Test Site	Crater	135 ft (41.1 m)	Basalt	5 at 1.1 each	Crosstie	A five-detonation excavation experiment to study the effects and phenomenology of nuclear row-charge excavation detonations.
Stoddard	September 17, 1968	Nevada Test Site	Shaft	1,535 ft (467.9 m)	Tuff	31	Bowline	A device-development experiment to develop clean nuclear explosives for excavation applications.
Schooner	December 8, 1968	Nevada Test Site	Crater	365 ft (111.3 m)	Tuff	30	Bowline	An excavation experiment to study the effects and phenomenology of cratering detonations in hard rock.
Rulison	September 10, 1969	Grand Valley, Colorado	Shaft	8,425 ft (2,567.9 m)	Sandstone	43	Mandrel	A gas stimulation experiment to investigate the feasibility of using nuclear explosives to stimulate a low-permeability gas field; provide engineering data on the use of nuclear explosions for gas stimulation; on changes in gas production and recovery rates; and on techniques to reduce the radioactive contamination to the gas.
Flask -Green, -Yellow, -Red	May 26, 1970	Nevada Test Site	Shaft	Green, 1736 ft (529.2 m); Yellow, 1,099 ft (335 m); Red, 499 ft (152.1 m)	Green, Tuff; Yellow and Red, Alluvium	Green, 105; Yellow, 0.9; Red, 0.4 tons	Mandrel	A three-detonation device development experiment to develop improved nuclear explosives for excavation applications.
Miniata	July 8, 1971	Nevada Test Site	Shaft	1,735 ft (528.8 m)	Tuff	83	Grommet	To develop a clean nuclear explosive for excavation applications.
Rio Blanco -1, -2, -3	May 17, 1973	Rifle, Colorado	Shaft	5,840 ft (1,780 m); 6,230 ft (1,898.9 m); 6,690 ft (2,039.1 m)	Sandstone, gas-bearing formation	3 at 33 each	Toggle	A gas stimulation experiment to investigate the feasibility of using nuclear explosives to stimulate a low-permeability gas field; develop technology for recovering natural gas from reservoirs with very low permeability.

== Non-nuclear tests ==
In addition to the nuclear tests, Plowshare executed a number of non-nuclear test projects in an attempt to learn more about how the nuclear explosives could best be used. Several of these projects led to practical utility as well as to furthering knowledge about large explosives. These projects included:

Test name	Date	Location	Type	Depth of Burial	Medium	Yield	Note
Pre-Gnome	February 10–16, 1959	Southeast of Carlsbad, New Mexico	seismic experiment (High explosive)	1,200 ft (365.8 m), each	Bedded salt	3.65 tons	Three seismic experiments to measure ground shock for the planned GNOME nuclear test.
Toboggan	November–December 1959 & April–June 1960	Nevada Test Site	ditching experiment (High explosive, TNT)	3 to 20 ft (1 to 6.1 m)	Playa (combination of silt and clay)	Series of 122 detonations of both linear and point HE charges	Study ditching characteristics of both-end detonated and multidetonated HE explosives in preparation for nuclear row charge experiments.
Hobo	February–April 1960	Nevada Test Site	seismic experiment (High explosive, TNT)	Unknown	Tuff	Three explosions, varying from 500 to 1,000 lb. charges each	To study rock fracturing and related phenomena produced by contained explosions.
Stagecoach	March 1960	Nevada Test Site	excavation experiment (High explosive, TNT)	Shot 1 – 80 ft (24.4 m); Shot 2 17.1 ft (5.2 m); Shot 3 – 34.2 ft (10.4 m)	Alluvium	Three 40,000 lb. charges	Examine blast, seismic effects and throw out characteristics in preparation for nuclear cratering experiments.
Plowboy	March–July 1960	Winnfield, Louisiana	experiment	Unknown	Unknown	Unknown	Mining operation to examine high explosive-induced fracturing of salt.
Buckboard	July–September 1960	Nevada Test Site	excavation experiment (High explosive, TNT)	5 to 59.85 ft (1.5 to 18.24 m)	Basalt	Three 40,000 lb. charges and ten 1,000 lb. charges	Establish depth of burst curves for underground explosives in a hard rock medium.
Pinot	August 2, 1960	Rifle, Colorado	tracer experiment (High explosive, nitromethane)	610 ft (185.9 m)	Oil shale	Unknown	To determine how gases in a confined underground explosion migrate.
Scooter	17:17 am, 13 October 1960	Nevada Test Site	excavation experiment (High explosive, TNT)	125 ft (38.1 m)	Alluvium	500 ton charges	To study crater dimension, throw out material distribution, ground motion, dust cloud growth, and long-range air blast. Initially scheduled for July, the shot was delayed due to the accidental use of dummy detonators. As the detonators had to be placed in the center of the charge, organizers were required to dig down to the TNT charge and then use a steam heated mandrel to melt to its center, an extremely hazardous process.
Rowboat	June 1961	Nevada Test Site	row-charge experiment (High explosive, TNT)	Varied	Alluvium	8 detonations of series of four 278 lb. charges	To study the effects of depth of burial and charge separation on crater dimensions.
Yo-Yo	Summer 1961	At LRL, near Tracy, California	simulated excavation experiment (High explosive)	Varied	Oil-sand mixture	100 gm charges	To develop estimates for the quantities of radiation released to the atmosphere by a cratering detonation.
Pre-Buggy I	November 1962 – February 1963	Nevada Test Site	row-charge experiment (High explosive, nitromethane)	15 to 21.4 ft (4.57 to 6.52 m) for single-charge detonations; all row-charge detonations at 19.8 ft (6.04 m)	Alluvium	Six single-charge detonations, four multiple-charge	U.S. Army Corps of Engineers Nuclear Cratering Group study of row- charge phenomenology and effects in preparation for nuclear row-charge tests.
Pre-Buggy II	June–August 1963	Nevada Test Site	row-charge experiment (High explosive, nitromethane)	18.5 to 23 ft (5.64 to 7.0 m)	Alluvium	Five rows of five 1,000 lb. charges	U.S. Army Corps of Engineers Nuclear Cratering Group study of row-charge phenomenology and effects in preparation for a nuclear row- charge experiment.
Pre-Schooner I	February 1964	Nevada Test Site	cratering experiment (High explosive, nitromethane)	42 to 66 ft (18.3 to 20.1 m)	Basalt	Four 40,000 lb. spherical charges	U.S. Army Corps of Engineers Nuclear Cratering Group study of basic cratering phenomenology in preparation for nuclear cratering experiments.
Dugout	June 24, 1964	Nevada Test Site	row charge experiment (High explosive, nitromethane)	59 ft (18.0 m)	Basalt	simultaneous detonation of a row of five 20 ton charges placed 45 feet (13.7 m) apart (1 crater radius)	Study fundamental processes involved in row charge excavating dense, hard rock.
Pre-Schooner II	September 30, 1965	Owyhee County, southwestern Idaho	cratering experiment (high explosive, nitromethane)	71 ft (21.6 m)	Rhyolite	85 ton charge	Obtain data for proposed Schooner nuclear cratering test, particularly cavity growth, seismic effects, and air blast.
Pre-Gondola I, II, III	October 1966 – October 1969	Near Fort Peck Reservoir, Valley County, Montana	excavation experiments (High explosive, nitromethane)	Varied	Saturated Bearclaw shale	Pre-Gondola I, four 20-ton charges; Pre-Gondola II, row of five charges totaling 140 tons; Pre-Gondola III, Phase I, three rows of seven one-ton charges; Phase II, one row of seven 30- ton charges; Phase III, one row of five charges varying from five to 35 tons and totaling 70 tons	U.S. Army Corps of Engineers Nuclear Cratering Group project to provide seismic calibration test data and cratering characteristics for excavation projects.
Tugboat	November 1969 – December 1970	Kawaihae Bay, Hawaii	excavation experiment (High explosive, TNT)	4–8 ft (1.2–2.4 m)	Water	Unknown	To study excavation of a small boat harbor in a weak coral medium.
Trinidad	July–December 1970	Trinidad, Colorado (six miles west)	excavation experiment (High explosive)	Unknown	Sandstone/shale	Unknown	Four series of row-charge detonations to study excavation designs.
Old Reliable	August 1971 – March 1972	Galiuro Mountains, 44 miles northeast Tucson, Arizona	fracturing experiment (High explosive, ammonium nitrate)	Unknown	Unknown	2,002 tons	To promote fracturing and in situ leaching of copper ore.

== Proposed nuclear projects ==
A number of projects were proposed and some planning accomplished, but were not followed through on. A list of these is given here:

Name	Date	Location	Purpose
Oxcart	1959	Nevada Test Site	Investigate excavation efficiency as a function of yield and depth in planning for Project Chariot.
Oilsand	1959	Athabasca, Canada	Study the feasibility of oil recovery using a nuclear explosive detonation in the Athabascan tar sands.
Oil Shale	1959	Not determined	Study a nuclear detonation to shatter an oil shale formation to extract oil.
Ditchdigger	1961	Not determined	A deeply buried clean nuclear explosive detonation excavation experiment
Coach	1963	Carlsbad, NM (GNOME site)	Produce neutron-rich isotopes of known trans- plutonium elements.
Phaeton	1963	Not determined	Scaling experiment.
Carryall	1963	Bristol Mountains Mojave Desert, CA	Row-charge excavation experiment to cut through the Bristol Mountains for realignment of the Santa Fe railroad and a new highway I-40.
Dogsled	1964	Colorado Plateau CO or AZ	Study cratering characteristics in dry sandstone; study ground shock and air blast intensities.
Tennessee/ Tombigee Waterway	1964	Northeast Mississippi	Excavation of three miles of a divide cut through low hills; connect Tennessee and Tombigee rivers; dig 250-mile long canal.
Interoceanic Sea-Level Canal Study	1965–70	Pan-American Isthmus (Central America)	Commission appointed in 1965 to conduct feasibility studies of several sea-level routes for an Atlantic- Pacific interoceanic canal. Two routes were in Panama and one in northwestern Colombia. The 1970 final report recommended, in part, that no current U.S. canal policy should be made on the basis that nuclear excavation technology will be available for canal construction. AEC deferred in making any decision.
Flivver	Mar. 1966	Nevada Test Site	A low-yield cratering detonation to study basic cratering phenomenology.
Dragon Trail	Dec. 1966	Rio Blanco County, CO	Natural gas stimulation experiment; different geological characteristics than either GASBUGGY or RULISON; geological study completed.
Ketch	Aug. 1967	Renovo, PA (12 miles SW)	Create a large chimney of broken rock with void space to store natural gas under high pressure.
Bronco	Oct. 1967	Rio Blanco County, CO	Break oil shale deposits for in situ retorting; exploratory core holes drilled.
Sloop	Oct. 1967 – 1968	Safford, AZ (11 miles NE)	Fracturing copper ore; extract copper by in situ leaching methods; feasibility study completed.
Thunderbird	1967	Gillette, WY (20 miles W)	Coal gasification; fracture rock-containing coal and in situ combustion of the coal would produce low-Btu gas and other products.
Galley	1967–68	Not determined	A high-yield row charge in hard rock under terrain of varying elevations.
Aquarius	1968–70	Clear Creek or San Simon, AZ	Water resource management; dam construction, subsurface storage, purification; aquifer modification.
Wagon Wheel	Jan. 1968 – 1974	Pinedale, WY (19 miles S)	Natural gas stimulation; study stimulation at various depths; an exploratory hole and two hydrological wells were drilled.
Wasp	Jul. 1969 – 1974	Pinedale, WY (24 miles NW)	Natural gas stimulation; meteorological observations taken.
Utah	1969	near Ouray, UT	Oil shale maturation; exploratory hole drilled.
Sturtevant	1969	Nevada Test Site	Cratering experiment to extend excavation information on yields and rock types relevant to the trans-Isthmian canal.
Australian Harbor Project	1969	Cape Keraudren (NW coast of Australia)	First discussed with U.S. officials in 1962, the U.S. formally agreed to participate in a joint feasibility study with the Australian government in early 1969 for using nuclear explosives to construct a harbor. The project was stopped in March 1969 when it was determined that there was an insufficient economic basis to proceed.
Yawl	1969–70	Nevada Test Site	Cratering experiment to extend excavation information on yields and rock types relevant to the trans-Isthmian canal.
Geothermal Power Plant	1971	Not determined	Geothermal resource experiment; fracturing would allow fluids circulated in fracture zones to be converted to steam to generate electricity.
Travois	1970	Various sites in California, New Mexico, Idaho and Oregon	Several nuclear quarrying projects to create rock fill for dam projects.

== See also ==
- Plowshares movement
- Atoms for Peace
- Nuclear Explosions for the National Economy – the equivalent Soviet program(s) that achieved "practical application" status.
- Atomic Age
- Project Orion, a study conducted from the 1950s to the 1960s into propelling spacecraft by detonating nuclear bombs behind them.
- Nuclear Cratering Group, U.S. Army Corps of Engineers organization at the Lawrence Radiation Laboratory focused on the use of nuclear explosives for excavation and quarrying applications
