= Operation Whetstone =

Series of 1960s US nuclear tests

- Whetstone Salmon, 5.3kt.

Information
- Country: United States
- Test site: NTS Area 15; NTS Area 16, Shoshone Mountain; NTS Area 18, Buckboard Mesa; NTS Area 19, 20, Pahute Mesa; NTS Areas 5, 11, Frenchman Flat; NTS, Areas 1-4, 6-10, Yucca Flat; Salmon Site, near Lumberton, Mississippi
- Period: 1964–1965
- Number of tests: 46
- Test type: cratering, underground shaft, tunnel
- Max. yield: 51 kilotonnes of TNT (210 TJ)

Test series chronology

The United States's Whetstone nuclear test series was a group of 46 nuclear tests conducted in 1964–1965. These tests (Note: A bomb test may be a salvo test, defined as two or more explosions "where a period of time between successive individual explosions does not exceed five seconds, and where the burial points of all explosive devices can be connected by segments of straight lines, each of them connecting two burial points and does not exceed 40 kilometers in length".V.N. (ed.). "Catalog of World Wide Nuclear Testing". Begell-Atom. Archived from the original on April 26, 2014.) followed the Operation Niblick series and preceded the Operation Flintlock series.

Two tests were conducted during this series by the United Kingdom: Cormorant and Courser.

United States' Whetstone series tests and detonations
Name (Note: The US, France and Great Britain have code-named their test events, while the USSR and China did not, and therefore have only test numbers (with some exceptions – Soviet peaceful explosions were named). Word translations into English in parentheses unless the name is a proper noun. A dash followed by a number indicates a member of a salvo event. The US also sometimes named the individual explosions in such a salvo test, which results in "name1 – 1(with name2)". If test is canceled or aborted, then the row data like date and location discloses the intended plans, where known.)	Date time (UT)	Local time zone (Note: To convert the UT time into standard local, add the number of hours in parentheses to the UT time; for local daylight saving time, add one additional hour. If the result is earlier than 00:00, add 24 hours and subtract 1 from the day; if it is 24:00 or later, subtract 24 hours and add 1 to the day. Historical time zone data obtained from the IANA time zone database.)	Location (Note: Rough place name and a latitude/longitude reference; for rocket-carried tests, the launch location is specified before the detonation location, if known. Some locations are extremely accurate; others (like airdrops and space blasts) may be quite inaccurate. "~" indicates a likely pro-forma rough location, shared with other tests in that same area.)	Elevation + height (Note: Elevation is the ground level at the point directly below the explosion relative to sea level; height is the additional distance added or subtracted by tower, balloon, shaft, tunnel, air drop, or other contrivance. For rocket bursts the ground level is "N/A". In some cases it is not clear if the height is absolute or relative to ground, for example, Plumbbob/John. No number or units indicates the value is unknown, while "0" means zero. Sorting on this column is by elevation and height added together.)	Delivery (Note: Atmospheric, airdrop, balloon, gun, cruise missile, rocket, surface, tower, and barge are all disallowed by the Partial Nuclear Test Ban Treaty. Sealed shaft and tunnel are underground, and remained useful under the PTBT. Intentional cratering tests are borderline; they occurred under the treaty, were sometimes protested, and generally overlooked if the test was declared to be a peaceful use.) Purpose (Note: Include weapons development, weapon effects, safety test, transport safety test, war, science, joint verification, and industrial/peaceful, which may be further broken down.)	Device (Note: Designations for test items where known, "?" indicates some uncertainty about the preceding value, nicknames for particular devices in quotes. This category of information is often not officially disclosed.)	Yield (Note: Estimated energy yield in tons, kilotons, and megatons. A ton of TNT equivalent is defined as 4.184 gigajoules (1 gigacalorie).)	Fallout (Note: Radioactive emission to the atmosphere aside from prompt neutrons, where known. The measured species is only iodine-131 if mentioned, otherwise it is all species. No entry means unknown, probably none if underground and "all" if not; otherwise notation for whether measured on the site only or off the site, where known, and the measured amount of radioactivity released.)	References	Notes
Bye	July 16, 1964 13:15:00.15	PST (–8 hrs)	NTS Area U10i 37.18215°N 116.04623°W	1,295 m (4,249 ft) – 389.26 m (1,277.1 ft)	underground shaft, weapons development		20 kt	Venting detected, less than 390 Ci (14,000 GBq)		
Links	July 23, 1964 13:30:00.15	PST (–8 hrs)	NTS Area U9bf 37.11371°N 116.03288°W	1,273 m (4,177 ft) – 119.8 m (393 ft)	underground shaft, weapons development		less than 20 kt	Venting detected on site, less than 7 Ci (260 GBq)		
Trogon	July 24, 1964 18:30:00.04	PST (–8 hrs)	NTS Area U3dj 37.04606°N 116.01293°W	1,204 m (3,950 ft) – 193.03 m (633.3 ft)	underground shaft, weapons development		less than 20 kt			
Alva	August 19, 1964 16:00:00.14	PST (–8 hrs)	NTS Area U2j 37.15902°N 116.08402°W	1,320 m (4,330 ft) – 166.04 m (544.8 ft)	underground shaft, weapons development		4.4 kt	Venting detected off site, 6.4 kCi (240 TBq)		
Canvasback	August 22, 1964 22:17:00.06	PST (–8 hrs)	NTS Area U3cp 37.06529°N 116.01631°W	1,226 m (4,022 ft) – 447.66 m (1,468.7 ft)	underground shaft, weapons development	Tsetse	18 kt	Venting detected, 2 kCi (74 TBq)		
Player	August 27, 1964 14:30:00.15	PST (–8 hrs)	NTS Area U9cc 37.11731°N 116.04153°W	1,254 m (4,114 ft) – 91.44 m (300.0 ft)	underground shaft, safety experiment	W62	less than 20 kt			
Haddock	August 28, 1964 17:06:00.04	PST (–8 hrs)	NTS Area U3dl 37.06699°N 116.02304°W	1,222 m (4,009 ft) – 363.66 m (1,193.1 ft)	underground shaft, weapons development		less than 20 kt			
Guanay	September 4, 1964 18:15:00.08	PST (–8 hrs)	NTS Area U3di 37.01757°N 116.02343°W	1,184 m (3,885 ft) – 260.97 m (856.2 ft)	underground shaft, weapons development		12 kt			
Spoon	September 11, 1964 14:00:00.1	PST (–8 hrs)	NTS Area U9bd 37.11367°N 116.02636°W	1,289 m (4,229 ft) – 179.68 m (589.5 ft)	underground shaft, weapons development		200 t	Venting detected, 390 Ci (14,000 GBq)		
Auk	October 2, 1964 20:03:00.04	PST (–8 hrs)	NTS Area U7b 37.07787°N 116.00937°W	1,254 m (4,114 ft) – 452.38 m (1,484.2 ft)	underground shaft, weapons development		12 kt			
Par	October 9, 1964 14:00:00.12	PST (–8 hrs)	NTS Area U2p 37.15138°N 116.0779°W	1,304 m (4,278 ft) – 403.86 m (1,325.0 ft)	underground shaft, peaceful research		38 kt	Venting detected, 610 Ci (23,000 GBq)		A Plowshare device with high neutron flux for creation of heavy isotopes.
Barbel - 1 (with Turnstone)	October 16, 1964 15:59:30.038	PST (–8 hrs)	NTS Area U3bx 37.03948°N 116.01641°W	1,194 m (3,917 ft) – 258.9 m (849 ft)	underground shaft, weapons development		7 kt	Venting detected, 290 Ci (11,000 GBq)		simultaneous, separate holes.
Turnstone - 2 (with Barbel)	October 16, 1964 15:59:30.03	PST (–8 hrs)	NTS Area U3dt 37.03349°N 116.02555°W	1,191 m (3,907 ft) +	underground shaft, weapons development	TX-57, Tsetse	less than 20 kt			simultaneous, separate holes.
Salmon	October 22, 1964 16:00:00.0	CST (–6 hrs)	Salmon Site, near Lumberton, Mississippi 31.14229°N 89.57001°W	74 m (243 ft) – 830 m (2,720 ft)	underground shaft, joint verification	W58	5.3 kt			Project Vela Uniform/Dribble, detection of underground tests. Exploded in Tatum salt dome.
Garden	October 23, 1964 15:00:00.94	PST (–8 hrs)	NTS Area U9aj 37.11699°N 116.03202°W	1,274 m (4,180 ft) – 149.66 m (491.0 ft)	underground shaft, weapons development		less than 20 kt			
Forest	October 31, 1964 17:04:58.61	PST (–8 hrs)	NTS Area U7a 37.10717°N 116.03312°W	1,270 m (4,170 ft) – 380.73 m (1,249.1 ft)	underground shaft, weapons development		less than 20 kt	Venting detected, 5 Ci (180 GBq)		
Handcar	November 5, 1964 15:00:00.11	PST (–8 hrs)	NTS Area U10b 37.17431°N 116.0679°W	1,307 m (4,288 ft) – 402.95 m (1,322.0 ft)	underground shaft, peaceful research	W55, Starling	12 kt	Venting detected on site, 70 Ci (2,600 GBq)		A Plowshare project for measuring effects of contained explosion on carbonate rock.
Crepe	December 5, 1964 21:15:00.1	PST (–8 hrs)	NTS Area U2q 37.11437°N 116.05431°W	1,252 m (4,108 ft) – 404.2 m (1,326 ft)	underground shaft, weapons development		20 kt	Venting detected, 250 Ci (9,200 GBq)		
Drill (Source-Lower) - 1	December 5, 1964 21:15:00.16	PST (–8 hrs)	NTS Area U2ai 37.13424°N 116.07062°W	1,280 m (4,200 ft) – 219.46 m (720.0 ft)	underground shaft, weapons development		3.4 kt	Venting detected off site, 61 kCi (2,300 TBq)		simultaneous, same hole.
Drill (Target-Upper) - 2	December 5, 1964 21:15:00.16	PST (–8 hrs)	NTS Area U2ai 37.13424°N 116.07062°W	1,280 m (4,200 ft) +	underground shaft, weapons development		less than 20 kt	Venting detected off site		simultaneous, same hole.
Cassowary - 1 (with Hoopoe)	December 16, 1964 20:00:00.07	PST (–8 hrs)	NTS Area U3bn 37.03954°N 116.02462°W	1,194 m (3,917 ft) – 150.14 m (492.6 ft)	underground shaft, weapons development		less than 20 kt			simultaneous, different holes.
Hoopoe - 2 (with Cassowary)	December 16, 1964 20:00:00.07	PST (–8 hrs)	NTS Area U3cf 37.0484°N 116.03397°W	1,200 m (3,900 ft) +	underground shaft, safety experiment		less than 20 kt			simultaneous, different holes.
Parrot	December 16, 1964 20:00:00.04	PST (–8 hrs)	NTS Area U3dk 37.03479°N 116.01303°W	1,192 m (3,911 ft) – 180.32 m (591.6 ft)	underground shaft, weapons development		1.3 kt	Venting detected off site, 230 kCi (8,500 TBq)		
Mudpack	December 16, 1964 20:10:00.1	PST (–8 hrs)	NTS Area U10n 37.17776°N 116.06781°W	1,310 m (4,300 ft) – 151.79 m (498.0 ft)	underground shaft, weapon effect		2.7 kt	Venting detected, less than 54 Ci (2,000 GBq)		
Sulky	December 18, 1964 19:35:00.09	PST (–8 hrs)	NTS Area U18d 37.08259°N 116.34345°W	1,597 m (5,240 ft) – 27.28 m (89.5 ft)	underground shaft, peaceful research	Mk-7	92 t	Venting detected off site, 130 kCi (4,800 TBq)		A Plowshare project for hard, dry excavation test, to study dispersion of radionuclides.
Wool	January 14, 1965 16:00:00.14	PST (–8 hrs)	NTS Area U9bh 37.11895°N 116.02565°W	1,287 m (4,222 ft) – 215.13 m (705.8 ft)	underground shaft, weapons development		7 kt	Venting detected, 200 Ci (7,400 GBq)		
Tern	January 29, 1965 18:22:00.03	PST (–8 hrs)	NTS Area U3dw 37.04497°N 116.01396°W	1,202 m (3,944 ft) – 210.65 m (691.1 ft)	underground shaft, weapons development		500 t	Venting detected on site, 170 Ci (6,300 GBq)		
Cashmere	February 4, 1965 15:30:00.11	PST (–8 hrs)	NTS Area U2ad 37.13073°N 116.06253°W	1,270 m (4,170 ft) – 232.18 m (761.7 ft)	underground shaft, weapons development		4 kt	Venting detected, 8 Ci (300 GBq)		
Alpaca	February 12, 1965 15:10:29.49	PST (–8 hrs)	NTS Area U2a 37.165°N 116.07744°W	1,315 m (4,314 ft) – 224.61 m (736.9 ft)	underground shaft, weapons development		330 t	Venting detected off site, 40 kCi (1,500 TBq)		
Merlin	February 16, 1965 17:30:00.04	PST (–8 hrs)	NTS Area U3ct 37.05163°N 116.02452°W	1,203 m (3,947 ft) – 296.14 m (971.6 ft)	underground shaft, weapons development	Tsetse	10.1 kt	I-131 venting detected, 0		
Wishbone	February 18, 1965 16:18:47.15	PST (–8 hrs)	NTS Area U5a 36.81798°N 115.9501°W	913 m (2,995 ft) – 179.22 m (588.0 ft)	underground shaft, weapon effect		5 kt	Venting detected on site, 6.9 kCi (260 TBq)		
Seersucker	February 19, 1965 15:28:54.11	PST (–8 hrs)	NTS Area U9bm 37.11723°N 116.03185°W	1,274 m (4,180 ft) – 142.34 m (467.0 ft)	underground shaft, weapons development		less than 20 kt	Venting detected on site, less than 410 Ci (15,000 GBq)		
Wagtail	March 3, 1965 19:13:00.03	PST (–8 hrs)	NTS Area U3an 37.06448°N 116.03793°W	1,210 m (3,970 ft) – 749.59 m (2,459.3 ft)	underground shaft, weapons development	TX-61	51 kt	Venting detected, 13 Ci (480 GBq)		
Suede	March 20, 1965 15:30:49.1	PST (–8 hrs)	NTS Area U9bk 37.11538°N 116.02736°W	1,286 m (4,219 ft) – 143.52 m (470.9 ft)	underground shaft, weapons development		200 t	Venting detected, 1.3 kCi (48 TBq)		
Cup	March 26, 1965 15:34:08.16	PST (–8 hrs)	NTS Area U9cb 37.14748°N 116.04415°W	1,267 m (4,157 ft) – 536.75 m (1,761.0 ft)	underground shaft, weapons development		38 kt	Venting detected, 4.7 kCi (170 TBq)		
Kestrel	April 5, 1965 21:00:00.04	PST (–8 hrs)	NTS Area U3dd 37.02576°N 116.02351°W	1,187 m (3,894 ft) – 446.87 m (1,466.1 ft)	underground shaft, weapons development	Tsetse	7 kt	Venting detected, 230 Ci (8,500 GBq)		
Palanquin	April 14, 1965 13:14:00.1	PST (–8 hrs)	NTS Area U20k 37.28033°N 116.52445°W	1,861 m (6,106 ft) – 85.34 m (280.0 ft)	cratering, peaceful research		4.3 kt	Venting detected off site, 11 MCi (410 PBq)		A Plowshare project for hard, dry excavation test, to study dispersion of radionuclides.
Gum Drop	April 21, 1965 22:00:00.03	PST (–8 hrs)	NTS Area U16a.02 37.00712°N 116.20293°W	1,931 m (6,335 ft) – 304.8 m (1,000 ft)	tunnel, weapon effect	W55, Kinglet	20 kt	Venting detected, 1.9 kCi (70 TBq)		
Chenille	April 22, 1965 13:39:00.1	PST (–8 hrs)	NTS Area U9bg 37.11137°N 116.03136°W	1,276 m (4,186 ft) – 140.74 m (461.7 ft)	underground shaft, weapons development		1 kt	Venting detected on site, less than 110 Ci (4,100 GBq)		
Muscovy	April 23, 1965 21:44:00.04	PST (–8 hrs)	NTS Area U3dx 37.01741°N 115.99605°W	1,189 m (3,901 ft) – 180.29 m (591.5 ft)	underground shaft, weapons development		600 t			
Tee	May 7, 1965 15:47:11.15	PST (–8 hrs)	NTS Area U2ab 37.14042°N 116.06745°W	1,283 m (4,209 ft) – 190.2 m (624 ft)	underground shaft, weapon effect		7 kt	Venting detected off site, 1.6 kCi (59 TBq)		
Buteo	May 12, 1965 18:15:00.1	PST (–8 hrs)	NTS Area U20a 37.24261°N 116.43175°W	1,960 m (6,430 ft) – 695.55 m (2,282.0 ft)	underground shaft, weapons development		less than 20 kt			
Cambric	May 14, 1965 14:57:52.15	PST (–8 hrs)	NTS Area U5e 36.82334°N 115.9677°W	929 m (3,048 ft) – 294.28 m (965.5 ft)	underground shaft, weapons development		750 t			Cambric and Cheshire (on Pahute Mesa) to study radioactivity movement in ground water. In 16 years 4 billion gallons (30 billion liters) were pumped, took 2 yrs for the tritium to move 300 ft (91 m). Sr-40 and Cs-137 never detected.
Scaup	May 14, 1965 17:32:36.23	PST (–8 hrs)	NTS Area U3da(s) 37.05875°N 116.0125°W	1,222 m (4,009 ft) – 427.02 m (1,401.0 ft)	underground shaft, weapons development		12 kt			
Tweed	May 21, 1965 13:08:52.11	PST (–8 hrs)	NTS Area U9bn 37.11848°N 116.02843°W	1,281 m (4,203 ft) – 281.07 m (922.1 ft)	underground shaft, weapons development		15 kt	Venting detected, 600 Ci (22,000 GBq)		
Petrel	June 11, 1965 19:45:00.04	PST (–8 hrs)	NTS Area U3dy 37.04279°N 116.01776°W	1,197 m (3,927 ft) – 180.75 m (593.0 ft)	underground shaft, weapons development	Mk-57, Tsetse	1.3 kt			
Organdy	June 11, 1965 20:28:37.11	PST (–8 hrs)	NTS Area U9bo 37.11573°N 116.02412°W	1,294 m (4,245 ft) – 169.47 m (556.0 ft)	underground shaft, weapons development		500 t	Venting detected, 130 Ci (4,800 GBq)		
Diluted Waters	June 16, 1965 16:30:00.15	PST (–8 hrs)	NTS Area U5b 36.81808°N 115.95709°W	916 m (3,005 ft) – 190.5 m (625 ft)	underground shaft, weapon effect		4 kt	Venting detected off site, 30 kCi (1,100 TBq)		
Tiny Tot	June 17, 1965 17:00:00.09	PST (–8 hrs)	NTS Area U15e 37.22337°N 116.05784°W	1,533 m (5,030 ft) – 110.95 m (364.0 ft)	tunnel, weapon effect	W54	less than 20 kt	Venting detected on site, 7 Ci (260 GBq)		
