= Operation Niblick =

Series of 1960s US nuclear tests

Information
- Country: United States
- Test site: NTS Area 12, Rainier Mesa; NTS, Areas 1–4, 6–10, Yucca Flat
- Period: 1963–1964
- Number of tests: 41
- Test type: underground shaft
- Max. yield: 249 kilotonnes of TNT (1,040 TJ)

Test series chronology

The United States's Niblick nuclear test series was a group of 41 nuclear tests conducted in 1963–1964. These tests (Note: A bomb test may be a salvo test, defined as two or more explosions "where a period of time between successive individual explosions does not exceed 5 seconds and where the burial points of all explosive devices can be connected by segments of straight lines, each of them connecting two burial points and does not exceed 40 kilometers in length". Mikhailov, V. N. "Catalog of World Wide Nuclear Testing". Begell-Atom. Archived from the original on April 26, 2014.) followed the Operation Roller Coaster series and preceded the Operation Whetstone series.

== List of the nuclear tests ==
United States' Niblick series tests and detonations
Name (Note: The US, France and Great Britain have code-named their test events, while the USSR and China did not, and therefore have only test numbers (with some exceptions – Soviet peaceful explosions were named). Word translations into English in parentheses unless the name is a proper noun. A dash followed by a number indicates a member of a salvo event. The US also sometimes named the individual explosions in such a salvo test, which results in "name1 – 1(with name2)". If test is canceled or aborted, then the row data like date and location discloses the intended plans, where known.)	Date time (UT)	Local time zone (Note: To convert the UT time into standard local, add the number of hours in parentheses to the UT time; for local daylight saving time, add one additional hour. If the result is earlier than 00:00, add 24 hours and subtract 1 from the day; if it is 24:00 or later, subtract 24 hours and add 1 to the day.)	Location (Note: Rough place name and a latitude/longitude reference; for rocket-carried tests, the launch location is specified before the detonation location, if known. Some locations are extremely accurate; others (like airdrops and space blasts) may be quite inaccurate. "~" indicates a likely pro-forma rough location, shared with other tests in that same area.)	Elevation + height (Note: Elevation is the ground level at the point directly below the explosion relative to sea level; height is the additional distance added or subtracted by tower, balloon, shaft, tunnel, air drop or other contrivance. For rocket bursts the ground level is "N/A". In some cases it is not clear if the height is absolute or relative to ground, for example, Plumbbob/John. No number or units indicates the value is unknown, while "0" means zero. Sorting on this column is by elevation and height added together.)	Delivery (Note: Atmospheric, airdrop, balloon, gun, cruise missile, rocket, surface, tower, and barge are all disallowed by the Partial Nuclear Test Ban Treaty. Sealed shaft and tunnel are underground, and remained useful under the PTBT. Intentional cratering tests are borderline; they occurred under the treaty, were sometimes protested, and generally overlooked if the test was declared to be a peaceful use.) Purpose (Note: Include weapons development, weapon effects, safety test, transport safety test, war, science, joint verification and industrial/peaceful, which may be further broken down.)	Device (Note: Designations for test items where known, "?" indicates some uncertainty about the preceding value, nicknames for particular devices in quotes. This category of information is often not officially disclosed.)	Yield (Note: Estimated energy yield in tons, kilotons, and megatons. A ton of TNT equivalent is defined as 4.184 gigajoules (1 gigacalorie).)	Fallout (Note: Radioactive emission to the atmosphere aside from prompt neutrons, where known. The measured species is only iodine-131 if mentioned, otherwise it is all species. No entry means unknown, probably none if underground and "all" if not; otherwise notation for whether measured on the site only or off the site, where known, and the measured amount of radioactivity released.)	References	Notes
Pekan	August 12, 1963 23:45:00.13	PST (–8 hrs)	NTS Area U3bw 37.04164°N 116.01644°W	1,197 m (3,927 ft) – 302.27 m (991.7 ft)	underground shaft, weapons development		8 kt	Venting detected, 1.1 MCi (41 PBq)		
Satsop	August 15, 1963 13:00:00.15	PST (–8 hrs)	NTS Area U2g 37.15407°N 116.07756°W	1,306 m (4,285 ft) – 224.94 m (738.0 ft)	underground shaft, weapons development		3 kt			
Kohocton – 1 (with Natches)	August 23, 1963 13:20:00.15	PST (–8 hrs)	NTS Area U9ak 37.12492°N 116.03626°W	1,289 m (4,229 ft) – 254.51 m (835.0 ft)	underground shaft, weapons development		less than 20 kt	Venting detected, 3 kCi (110 TBq)		
Natches – 2 (with Kohocton)	August 23, 1963 13:20:00.14	PST (–8 hrs)	NTS Area U9ak1 37.12492°N 116.03612°W	1,261 m (4,137 ft) +	underground shaft, weapons development		less than 20 kt			
Ahtanum	September 13, 1963 13:53:00.15	PST (–8 hrs)	NTS Area U2l 37.16333°N 116.08157°W	1,320 m (4,330 ft) – 225.55 m (740.0 ft)	underground shaft, weapons development		1 kt	Venting detected, 35 Ci (1,300 GBq)		
Bilby	September 13, 1963 17:00:00.13	PST (–8 hrs)	NTS Area U3on 37.06053°N 116.02237°W	1,215 m (3,986 ft) – 714.3 m (2,344 ft)	underground shaft, weapons development		249 kt	Venting detected, 1 Ci (37 GBq)		
Carp	September 27, 1963 14:20:00.13	PST (–8 hrs)	NTS Area U3cb 37.03728°N 116.01643°W	1,193 m (3,914 ft) – 329.55 m (1,081.2 ft)	underground shaft, weapons development		80 t	Venting detected on site, 1.1 kCi (41 TBq)		
Narraguagus	September 27, 1963 17:30:00.15	PST (–8 hrs)	NTS Area U2f 37.15473°N 116.07423°W	1,302 m (4,272 ft) – 150.27 m (493.0 ft)	underground shaft, weapons development		80 t	Venting detected, 160 Ci (5,900 GBq)		
Grunion	October 11, 1963 14:00:00.11	PST (–8 hrs)	NTS Area U3bz 37.03735°N 116.02196°W	1,193 m (3,914 ft) – 261.31 m (857.3 ft)	underground shaft, weapons development		8 kt	Venting detected, 4 kCi (150 TBq)		
Tornillo	October 11, 1963 21:00:00.155	PST (–8 hrs)	NTS Area U9aq 37.11867°N 116.03473°W	1,267 m (4,157 ft) – 149.05 m (489.0 ft)	underground shaft, peaceful research		380 t	Venting detected, 520 Ci (19,000 GBq)		Plowshare experiment to provide a clean device for excavations.
Clearwater	October 16, 1963 17:00:00.14	PST (–8 hrs)	NTS Area U12q 37.19812°N 116.23038°W	2,233 m (7,326 ft) – 548.03 m (1,798.0 ft)	underground shaft, weapons development		60 kt	Venting detected, 4.6 kCi (170 TBq)		
Mullet	October 17, 1963 15:00:00.15	PST (–8 hrs)	NTS Area U2ag 37.13076°N 116.06783°W	1,275 m (4,183 ft) – 60.35 m (198.0 ft)	underground shaft, safety experiment		less than 20 kt			
Shoal	October 26, 1963 17:00:00.1	PST (–8 hrs)	Fallon, Nevada 39.20012°N 118.38124°W	1,603 m (5,259 ft) – 370 m (1,210 ft)	underground shaft, joint verification		12 kt	Venting detected, 110 Ci (4,100 GBq)		Project Vela Uniform, investigation of detection of underground testing.
Anchovy	November 14, 1963 16:00:00.12	PST (–8 hrs)	NTS Area U3bq 37.03947°N 116.01913°W	1,194 m (3,917 ft) – 260.25 m (853.8 ft)	underground shaft, weapons development		9 kt	Venting detected on site, less than 230 kCi (8,500 TBq)		
Mustang	November 15, 1963 15:00:00.15	PST (–8 hrs)	NTS Area U9at 37.13226°N 116.04776°W	1,257 m (4,124 ft) – 165.81 m (544.0 ft)	underground shaft, weapons development		2 kt	Venting detected, 100 Ci (3,700 GBq)		
Greys	November 22, 1963 17:30:00.15	PST (–8 hrs)	NTS Area U9ax 37.11929°N 116.04604°W	1,248 m (4,094 ft) – 300.84 m (987.0 ft)	underground shaft, weapons development		20 kt	Venting detected, less than 460 Ci (17,000 GBq)		
Barracuda – 2 (with Sardine)	December 4, 1963 16:38:30.13	PST (–8 hrs)	NTS Area U3cr 37.04386°N 116.01295°W	1,202 m (3,944 ft) – 263.3 m (864 ft)	underground shaft, weapons development		less than 20 kt	Venting detected on site, 100 Ci (3,700 GBq)		Simultaneous, separate holes.
Sardine – 1 (with Barracuda)	December 4, 1963 16:38:30.118	PST (–8 hrs)	NTS Area U3ch 37.03959°N 116.03009°W	1,194 m (3,917 ft) – 262 m (860 ft)	underground shaft, weapons development		8 kt	Venting detected on site, 30 Ci (1,100 GBq)		Simultaneous, separate holes.
Eagle	December 12, 1963 16:02:00.15	PST (–8 hrs)	NTS Area U9av 37.13098°N 116.04476°W	1,254 m (4,114 ft) – 164.59 m (540.0 ft)	underground shaft, weapons development		5.3 kt	Venting detected off site, 760 Ci (28,000 GBq)		
Tuna	December 20, 1963 15:24:00.13	PST (–8 hrs)	NTS Area U3de 37.05277°N 116.03413°W	1,203 m (3,947 ft) – 414.35 m (1,359.4 ft)	underground shaft, weapons development		less than 20 kt	Venting detected on site, less than 0.1 Ci (3.7 GBq)		
Fore	January 16, 1964 16:00:00.15	PST (–8 hrs)	NTS Area U9ao 37.14205°N 116.05014°W	1,263 m (4,144 ft) – 490.42 m (1,609.0 ft)	underground shaft, weapons development		38 kt	Venting detected, 1.2 kCi (44 TBq)		
Oconto	January 23, 1964 16:00:00.15	PST (–8 hrs)	NTS Area U9ay 37.12637°N 116.0372°W	1,260 m (4,130 ft) – 264.69 m (868.4 ft)	underground shaft, weapons development		10.5 kt	Venting detected off site, 30 kCi (1,100 TBq)		
Club	January 30, 1964 16:00:00.15	PST (–8 hrs)	NTS Area U2aa 37.13616°N 116.07153°W	1,283 m (4,209 ft) – 180.44 m (592.0 ft)	underground shaft, weapons development		2 kt	Venting detected, 590 Ci (22,000 GBq)		
Solendon	February 12, 1964 15:38:00.12	PST (–8 hrs)	NTS Area U3cz 37.05659°N 116.02998°W	1,206 m (3,957 ft) – 150.17 m (492.7 ft)	underground shaft, weapons development		less than 20 kt	Venting detected on site, 10 Ci (370 GBq)		
Bunker	February 13, 1964 15:30:00.15	PST (–8 hrs)	NTS Area U9bb 37.13201°N 116.03325°W	1,270 m (4,170 ft) – 226.77 m (744.0 ft)	underground shaft, weapons development		1.5 kt	Venting detected on site, less than 420 Ci (16,000 GBq)		
Bonefish	February 18, 1964 15:37:19.12	PST (–8 hrs)	NTS Area U3bt 37.05937°N 116.03405°W	1,207 m (3,960 ft) – 300.76 m (986.7 ft)	underground shaft, weapons development		5 kt	Venting detected, 19 Ci (700 GBq)		
Mackerel	February 18, 1964 15:37:37.124	PST (–8 hrs)	NTS Area U4b 37.09558°N 116.05159°W	1,236 m (4,055 ft) – 333.71 m (1,094.8 ft)	underground shaft, weapons development		less than 20 kt			
Klickitat	February 20, 1964 15:30:00.15	PST (–8 hrs)	NTS Area U10e 37.15084°N 116.04098°W	1,273 m (4,177 ft) – 492.56 m (1,616.0 ft)	underground shaft, peaceful research		70 kt	Venting detected, less than 10 Ci (370 GBq)		A Plowshare device-development experiment to produce an improved nuclear explosive for excavation applications.
Handicap	March 12, 1964 15:00:00.01	PST (–8 hrs)	NTS Area U9ba 37.12995°N 116.03726°W	1,261 m (4,137 ft) – 143.26 m (470.0 ft)	underground shaft, weapons development		200 t	Venting detected on site, 300 Ci (11,000 GBq)		
Pike	March 13, 1964 16:02:00.12	PST (–8 hrs)	NTS Area U3cy 37.05042°N 116.01224°W	1,211 m (3,973 ft) – 114.5 m (376 ft)	underground shaft, weapons development		2 kt	Venting detected off site, 120 kCi (4,400 TBq)		Vented massively for 69 seconds after detonation until quieted by chimney collapse. Possible fault crack.
Hook	April 14, 1964 14:40:00.15	PST (–8 hrs)	NTS Area U9bc 37.12887°N 116.0307°W	1,276 m (4,186 ft) – 203.67 m (668.2 ft)	underground shaft, weapons development		3 kt	Venting detected on site, less than 350 Ci (13,000 GBq)		
Sturgeon	April 15, 1964 14:30:00.12	PST (–8 hrs)	NTS Area U3bo 37.04393°N 116.01911°W	1,198 m (3,930 ft) – 149.77 m (491.4 ft)	underground shaft, weapons development		2 kt	Venting detected, 230 Ci (8,500 GBq)		
Bogey	April 17, 1964 15:29:52.28	PST (–8 hrs)	NTS Area U9au 37.11944°N 116.03476°W	1,265 m (4,150 ft) – 118.84 m (389.9 ft)	underground shaft, weapons development		less than 20 kt	Venting detected on site, less than 60 Ci (2,200 GBq)		
Turf	April 24, 1964 20:10:00.15	PST (–8 hrs)	NTS Area U10c 37.14982°N 116.05609°W	1,272 m (4,173 ft) – 506.88 m (1,663.0 ft)	underground shaft, weapons development		38 kt	Venting detected, less than 200 Ci (7,400 GBq)		Subsidence crater created by Turf and Storax Santee converted into the U10c waste disposal facility in 1971.
Pipefish	April 29, 1964 20:47:00.12	PST (–8 hrs)	NTS Area U3co 37.03954°N 116.02735°W	1,194 m (3,917 ft) – 261.92 m (859.3 ft)	underground shaft, weapons development		15 kt	I-131 venting detected, 0		
Driver	May 7, 1964 13:00:00.15	PST (–8 hrs)	NTS Area U9ar 37.12021°N 116.04116°W	1,253 m (4,111 ft) – 148.19 m (486.2 ft)	underground shaft, weapons development		less than 20 kt	Venting detected on site, 37 Ci (1,400 GBq)		
Backswing	May 14, 1964 14:40:00.15	PST (–8 hrs)	NTS Area U9aw 37.11729°N 116.03981°W	1,257 m (4,124 ft) – 163.37 m (536.0 ft)	underground shaft, weapons development		8 kt	Venting detected on site, 37 Ci (1,400 GBq)		
Minnow	May 15, 1964 16:15:00.12	PST (–8 hrs)	NTS Area U3cv 37.04167°N 116.01297°W	1,199 m (3,934 ft) – 241.34 m (791.8 ft)	underground shaft, weapons development		6 kt			
Ace	June 11, 1964 16:45:00.15	PST (–8 hrs)	NTS Area U2n 37.14856°N 116.07687°W	1,300 m (4,300 ft) – 262.74 m (862.0 ft)	underground shaft, peaceful research		3 kt	Venting detected on site, 9 Ci (330 GBq)		A Plowshare device-development experiment to produce an improved nuclear explosive for excavation applications.
Bitterling	June 12, 1964 14:01:00.1	PST (–8 hrs)	NTS Area U3cu 37.03892°N 116.01293°W	1,196 m (3,924 ft) – 192.6 m (632 ft)	underground shaft, weapons development		500 t			
Duffer	June 18, 1964 13:30:00.2	PST (–8 hrs)	NTS Area U10ds 37.16595°N 116.03928°W	1,288 m (4,226 ft) – 445.71 m (1,462.3 ft)	underground shaft, weapons development		150 t	Venting detected, less than 41 Ci (1,500 GBq)		
Fade	June 25, 1964 13:30:00.14	PST (–8 hrs)	NTS Area U9be 37.11109°N 116.02965°W	1,280 m (4,200 ft) – 205.16 m (673.1 ft)	underground shaft, weapons development		6 kt	Venting detected on site, 35 Ci (1,300 GBq)		
Dub	June 30, 1964 13:33:00.14	PST (–8 hrs)	NTS Area U10a 37.17434°N 116.05736°W	1,282 m (4,206 ft) – 258.56 m (848.3 ft)	underground shaft, peaceful research		11.7 kt	Venting detected on site, 29 Ci (1,100 GBq)		A Plowshare experiment to develop emplacement techniques.
