= Operation Storax =

Series of 1960s US nuclear tests

- Storax Sedan

Information
- Country: United States
- Test site: NTS Area 12, Rainier Mesa; NTS, Areas 1–4, 6–10, Yucca Flat
- Period: 1962–1963
- Number of tests: 47
- Test type: cratering, underground shaft, tunnel
- Max. yield: 115 kilotonnes of TNT (480 TJ)

Test series chronology

Operation Storax was a series of 47 nuclear tests conducted by the United States in 1962–1963 at the Nevada Test Site. These tests followed the Operation Fishbowl series and preceded the Operation Roller Coaster series.

== British tests ==
Some accounts include the second British nuclear weapons test at the Nevada Test Site, shot Tendrac, as part of Storax. See British nuclear testing in the United States for more details.

== Tests ==
United States' Storax series tests and detonations
Name (Note: The US, France and Great Britain have code-named their test events, while the USSR and China did not, and therefore have only test numbers (with some exceptions – Soviet peaceful explosions were named). Word translations into English in parentheses unless the name is a proper noun. A dash followed by a number indicates a member of a salvo event. The US also sometimes named the individual explosions in such a salvo test, which results in "name1 – 1(with name2)". If test is canceled or aborted, then the row data like date and location discloses the intended plans, where known.)	Date time (UT)	Local time zone (Note: To convert the UT time into standard local, add the number of hours in parentheses to the UT time; for local daylight saving time, add one additional hour. If the result is earlier than 00:00, add 24 hours and subtract 1 from the day; if it is 24:00 or later, subtract 24 hours and add 1 to the day. Historical time zone data obtained from the IANA time zone database.)	Location (Note: Rough place name and a latitude/longitude reference; for rocket-carried tests, the launch location is specified before the detonation location, if known. Some locations are extremely accurate; others (like airdrops and space blasts) may be quite inaccurate. "~" indicates a likely pro-forma rough location, shared with other tests in that same area.)	Elevation + height (Note: Elevation is the ground level at the point directly below the explosion relative to sea level; height is the additional distance added or subtracted by tower, balloon, shaft, tunnel, air drop or other contrivance. For rocket bursts the ground level is "N/A". In some cases it is not clear if the height is absolute or relative to ground, for example, Plumbbob/John. No number or units indicates the value is unknown, while "0" means zero. Sorting on this column is by elevation and height added together.)	Delivery (Note: Atmospheric, airdrop, balloon, gun, cruise missile, rocket, surface, tower, and barge are all disallowed by the Partial Nuclear Test Ban Treaty. Sealed shaft and tunnel are underground, and remained useful under the PTBT. Intentional cratering tests are borderline; they occurred under the treaty, were sometimes protested, and generally overlooked if the test was declared to be a peaceful use.) Purpose (Note: Include weapons development, weapon effects, safety test, transport safety test, war, science, joint verification and industrial/peaceful, which may be further broken down.)	Device (Note: Designations for test items where known, "?" indicates some uncertainty about the preceding value, nicknames for particular devices in quotes. This category of information is often not officially disclosed.)	Yield (Note: Estimated energy yield in tons, kilotons, and megatons. A ton of TNT equivalent is defined as 4.184 gigajoules (1 gigacalorie).)	Fallout (Note: Radioactive emission to the atmosphere aside from prompt neutrons, where known. The measured species is only iodine-131 if mentioned, otherwise it is all species. No entry means unknown, probably none if underground and "all" if not; otherwise notation for whether measured on the site only or off the site, where known, and the measured amount of radioactivity released.)	References	Notes
Sedan	July 6, 1962 17:00:00.15	PST (–8 hrs)	NTS Area U10h 37.17695°N 116.04626°W	1,325 m (4,347 ft)–190 m (620 ft)	cratering, peaceful research	W56	104 kt	Venting detected off site, 15 MCi (560 PBq)		2nd Plowshare test, cratering experiment, TN device similar to Dominic Bluestone and Swanee, 12 million tons of soil displaced, crater was 1,280 ft × 320 ft (390 m × 98 m).
Merrimac	July 13, 1962 16:00:00.15	PST (–8 hrs)	NTS Area U3bd 37.05507°N 116.03411°W	1,205 m (3,953 ft)–413.31 m (1,356.0 ft)	underground shaft, weapons development		20 kt	Venting detected on site, 22 kCi (810 TBq)		
Wichita	July 27, 1962 21:00:00.16	PST (–8 hrs)	NTS Area U9y 37.12967°N 116.05734°W	1,265 m (4,150 ft)–150.27 m (493.0 ft)	underground shaft, weapons development		3.5 kt	Venting detected on site, 760 Ci (28,000 GBq)		
York	August 24, 1962 15:00:00.15	PST (–8 hrs)	NTS Area U9z 37.11866°N 116.04022°W	1,256 m (4,121 ft)–226.47 m (743.0 ft)	underground shaft, weapons development		5 kt	Venting detected, 120 kCi (4,400 TBq)		
Bobac	August 24, 1962 17:00:00.13	PST (–8 hrs)	NTS Area U3bl 37.04613°N 116.02453°W	1,199 m (3,934 ft)–206.03 m (676.0 ft)	underground shaft, weapons development		2.5 kt	I-131 venting detected, 0		
Raritan	September 6, 1962 17:00:00.16	PST (–8 hrs)	NTS Area U9u 37.13026°N 116.04561°W	1,254 m (4,114 ft)–157.28 m (516.0 ft)	underground shaft, weapons development		2 kt	Venting detected, 1.2 kCi (44 TBq)		
Hyrax	September 14, 1962 17:10:00.12	PST (–8 hrs)	NTS Area U3bh 37.04389°N 116.02186°W	1,197 m (3,927 ft)–216.69 m (710.9 ft)	underground shaft, weapons development		5 kt	I-131 venting detected, 0		
Peba	September 20, 1962 17:00:00.12	PST (–8 hrs)	NTS Area U3bb 37.05496°N 116.03°W	1,205 m (3,953 ft)–241.38 m (791.9 ft)	underground shaft, weapons development		11 kt			
Allegheny	September 29, 1962 17:00:00.15	PST (–8 hrs)	NTS Area U9x 37.11663°N 116.03366°W	1,271 m (4,170 ft)–210.92 m (692.0 ft)	underground shaft, weapons development		1 kt	Venting detected on site, 1.5 kCi (56 TBq)		
Mississippi	October 5, 1962 17:00:00.16	PST (–8 hrs)	NTS Area U9ad 37.13937°N 116.0512°W	1,264 m (4,147 ft)–493.78 m (1,620.0 ft)	underground shaft, weapons development		115 kt	Venting detected, 4.9 kCi (180 TBq)		
Roanoke	October 12, 1962 15:00:00.16	PST (–8 hrs)	NTS Area U9q 37.1227°N 116.05168°W	1,252 m (4,108 ft)–154.53 m (507.0 ft)	underground shaft, weapons development		7 kt	Venting detected on site, 1.2 kCi (44 TBq)		
Wolverine	October 12, 1962 17:00:00.12	PST (–8 hrs)	NTS Area U3av 37.04876°N 116.0333°W	1,200 m (3,900 ft)–73.43 m (240.9 ft)	underground shaft, weapons development		less than 20 kt	Venting detected on site, less than 100 Ci (3,700 GBq)		
Tioga	October 18, 1962 15:00:00.15	PST (–8 hrs)	NTS Area U9f 37.1285°N 116.04111°W	1,254 m (4,114 ft)–59.44 m (195.0 ft)	underground shaft, weapons development		less than 20 kt			
Bandicoot	October 19, 1962 18:00:00.08	PST (–8 hrs)	NTS Area U3bj 37.03951°N 116.02185°W	1,195 m (3,921 ft)–241.3 m (792 ft)	underground shaft, weapons development		12.5 kt	Venting detected off site, 3 MCi (110 PBq)		Yield was higher than expected, leading to a containement failure and venting as the stemming plan anticipated a lower yield.
Santee	October 27, 1962 15:00:00.15	PST (–8 hrs)	NTS Area U10f 37.14926°N 116.05437°W	1,270 m (4,170 ft)–319.43 m (1,048.0 ft)	underground shaft, weapons development		5 kt	Venting detected, 4 kCi (150 TBq)		Subsidence crater created by Santee and Niblick Turf converted into the U10c waste disposal facility in 1971.
St. Lawrence	November 9, 1962 18:00:00.16	PST (–8 hrs)	NTS Area U2b 37.16379°N 116.07419°W	1,309 m (4,295 ft)–166.42 m (546.0 ft)	underground shaft, weapons development		less than 20 kt	Venting detected on site, 6 kCi (220 TBq)		
Gundi	November 15, 1962 16:30:00.08	PST (–8 hrs)	NTS Area U3bm 37.04172°N 116.02461°W	1,195 m (3,921 ft)–241.44 m (792.1 ft)	underground shaft, weapons development		less than 20 kt			
Anacostia	November 27, 1962 18:00:00.14	PST (–8 hrs)	NTS Area U9i 37.12275°N 116.02993°W	1,274 m (4,180 ft)–227.69 m (747.0 ft)	underground shaft, peaceful research		5.2 kt	Venting detected on site, 6.8 kCi (250 TBq)		3rd Plowshare test, device development, accidental release of radioactivity detected on site only. Designed to produce heavy isotopes and provide radioachemical analysis data for Coach.
Taunton	December 4, 1962 16:00:00.15	PST (–8 hrs)	NTS Area U9aa 37.12804°N 116.05088°W	1,256 m (4,121 ft)–227.84 m (747.5 ft)	underground shaft, weapons development		less than 20 kt	Venting detected, 4 kCi (150 TBq)		
Madison	December 12, 1962 17:25:00.12	PST (–8 hrs)	NTS Area U12g.01 37.17214°N 116.20282°W	2,252 m (7,388 ft)–245.36 m (805.0 ft)	tunnel, weapons development		less than 20 kt	Venting detected, 20 kCi (740 TBq)		
Numbat	December 12, 1962 18:45:00.12	PST (–8 hrs)	NTS Area U3bu 37.04609°N 116.01637°W	1,201 m (3,940 ft)–231.95 m (761.0 ft)	underground shaft, weapons development		11 kt	I-131 venting detected, 0		
Manatee	December 14, 1962 18:00:00.16	PST (–8 hrs)	NTS Area U9af 37.12419°N 116.04083°W	1,254 m (4,114 ft)–58.52 m (192.0 ft)	underground shaft, weapons development		less than 20 kt	Venting detected, 1.8 kCi (67 TBq)		
Casselman	February 8, 1963 16:00:00.16	PST (–8 hrs)	NTS Area U10g 37.14891°N 116.05265°W	1,268 m (4,160 ft)–302.97 m (994.0 ft)	underground shaft, weapons development	W47Y2 primary.	6 kt	Venting detected, 6.3 kCi (230 TBq)		Part of the test was to determine warhead tritium requirements for a 4 year service life. The Y2 version of the W47 used a delta-plutonium pit to increase the weapon's resistance to hostile neutron effects.
Hatchie	February 8, 1963 16:00:01.15	PST (–8 hrs)	NTS Area U9e 37.1259°N 116.03962°W	1,256 m (4,121 ft)–60.96 m (200.0 ft)	underground shaft, weapons development		less than 20 kt			
Acushi	February 8, 1963 18:30:00.14	PST (–8 hrs)	NTS Area U3bg 37.04608°N 116.0218°W	1,199 m (3,934 ft)–260.87 m (855.9 ft)	underground shaft, weapons development		9 kt			
Ferret	February 8, 1963 18:30:00.13	PST (–8 hrs)	NTS Area U3bf 37.05832°N 116.03°W	1,208 m (3,963 ft)–325.69 m (1,068.5 ft)	underground shaft, weapons development		less than 20 kt			
Chipmunk	February 15, 1963 17:00:00.13	PST (–8 hrs)	NTS Area U3ay 37.049°N 116.03249°W	1,201 m (3,940 ft)–59.38 m (194.8 ft)	underground shaft, safety experiment		less than 20 kt			
Kaweah	February 21, 1963 19:47:00.14	PST (–8 hrs)	NTS Area U9ab 37.12026°N 116.04659°W	1,249 m (4,098 ft)–227.08 m (745.0 ft)	underground shaft, peaceful research		3 kt	Venting detected, 40 kCi (1,500 TBq)		4th Plowshare test, device development. Designed to produce heavy isotopes and provide radioachemical analysis data for Coach.
Carmel	February 21, 1963 19:47:08.63	PST (–8 hrs)	NTS Area U2h 37.15477°N 116.08078°W	1,311 m (4,301 ft)–163.37 m (536.0 ft)	underground shaft, weapons development		less than 20 kt	Venting detected, 7.2 kCi (270 TBq)		
Jerboa	March 1, 1963 19:00:00.12	PST (–8 hrs)	NTS Area U3at 37.04447°N 116.02736°W	1,197 m (3,927 ft)–301.16 m (988.1 ft)	underground shaft, weapons development		less than 20 kt			
Toyah	March 15, 1963 16:22:53.14	PST (–8 hrs)	NTS Area U9ac 37.12583°N 116.04568°W	1,252 m (4,108 ft)–130.76 m (429.0 ft)	underground shaft, weapons development		less than 20 kt	Venting detected, 1.2 kCi (44 TBq)		
Gerbil	March 29, 1963 15:49:00.12	PST (–8 hrs)	NTS Area U3bp 37.0417°N 116.01913°W	1,196 m (3,924 ft)–279.5 m (917 ft)	underground shaft, weapons development		11 kt			
Ferret Prime	April 5, 1963 17:52:00.13	PST (–8 hrs)	NTS Area U3by 37.0373°N 116.02468°W	1,193 m (3,914 ft)–241.55 m (792.5 ft)	underground shaft, weapons development		7 kt			
Coypu	April 10, 1963 16:01:30.12	PST (–8 hrs)	NTS Area U3af 37.04879°N 116.03106°W	1,201 m (3,940 ft)–74.6 m (245 ft)	underground shaft, safety experiment		less than 20 kt			
Cumberland	April 11, 1963 16:03:00.16	PST (–8 hrs)	NTS Area U2e 37.15663°N 116.07183°W	1,299 m (4,262 ft)–227.08 m (745.0 ft)	underground shaft, weapons development		6 kt	Venting detected, 8.5 kCi (310 TBq)		
Kootanai	April 24, 1963 16:09:30.141	PST (–8 hrs)	NTS Area U9w 37.12055°N 116.03715°W	1,261 m (4,137 ft)–181.97 m (597.0 ft)	underground shaft, weapons development		less than 20 kt	Venting detected on site, 410 Ci (15,000 GBq)		
Paisano	April 24, 1963 16:09:30.142	PST (–8 hrs)	NTS Area U9w1(wi?) 37.12048°N 116.03704°W	1,261 m (4,137 ft)–56.69 m (186.0 ft)	underground shaft, weapons development		less than 20 kt	I-131 venting detected, 0		
Gundi Prime	May 9, 1963 18:19:00	PST (–8 hrs)	NTS Area U3db 37.04933°N 116.01631°W	1,205 m (3,953 ft)–271.73 m (891.5 ft)	underground shaft, weapons development		8 kt			
Harkee	May 17, 1963 14:55:00.0	PST (–8 hrs)	NTS Area U3bv 37.04388°N 116.01637°W	1,200 m (3,900 ft)–241.42 m (792.1 ft)	underground shaft, weapons development		less than 20 kt			
Tejon	May 17, 1963 14:55:00.0	PST (–8 hrs)	NTS Area U3cg 37.04831°N 116.0331°W	1,199 m (3,934 ft)–74.6 m (245 ft)	underground shaft, safety experiment		less than 20 kt			
Stones	May 22, 1963 15:40:00.14	PST (–8 hrs)	NTS Area U9ae 37.11101°N 116.03993°W	1,257 m (4,124 ft)–394.72 m (1,295.0 ft)	underground shaft, weapons development		20 kt	Venting detected, 5.8 kCi (210 TBq)		
Pleasant	May 29, 1963 15:03:30.16	PST (–8 hrs)	NTS Area U9ah 37.12805°N 116.04429°W	1,253 m (4,111 ft)–210.31 m (690.0 ft)	underground shaft, weapons development		2 kt	Venting detected on site, 760 Ci (28,000 GBq)		
Yuba	June 5, 1963 17:00:00.12	PST (–8 hrs)	NTS Area U12b.10 37.19653°N 116.21004°W	2,240 m (7,350 ft)–242.41 m (795.3 ft)	tunnel, weapons development		3.1 kt	Venting detected off site, 110 Ci (4,100 GBq)		
Hutia	June 6, 1963 14:00:00.13	PST (–8 hrs)	NTS Area U3bc 37.04498°N 116.03723°W	1,198 m (3,930 ft)–134.57 m (441.5 ft)	underground shaft, weapons development		3 kt			
Apshapa	June 6, 1963 16:58:00.15	PST (–8 hrs)	NTS Area U9ai 37.12459°N 116.04092°W	1,254 m (4,114 ft)–89.92 m (295.0 ft)	underground shaft, weapons development		less than 20 kt	Venting detected on site, 4 Ci (150 GBq)		
Mataco	June 14, 1963 14:10:00.13	PST (–8 hrs)	NTS Area U3bk 37.0461°N 116.01909°W	1,200 m (3,900 ft)–195.56 m (641.6 ft)	underground shaft, weapons development		3 kt			
Kennebec	June 25, 1963 23:00:00.15	PST (–8 hrs)	NTS Area U2af 37.13135°N 116.06893°W	1,276 m (4,186 ft)–226.16 m (742.0 ft)	underground shaft, weapons development		4 kt	Venting detected on site, 30 Ci (1,100 GBq)		
