= Salmon Site =

Site of nuclear weapons test

Coordinates: 31°8′32″N 89°34′12″W

Cross section of the site

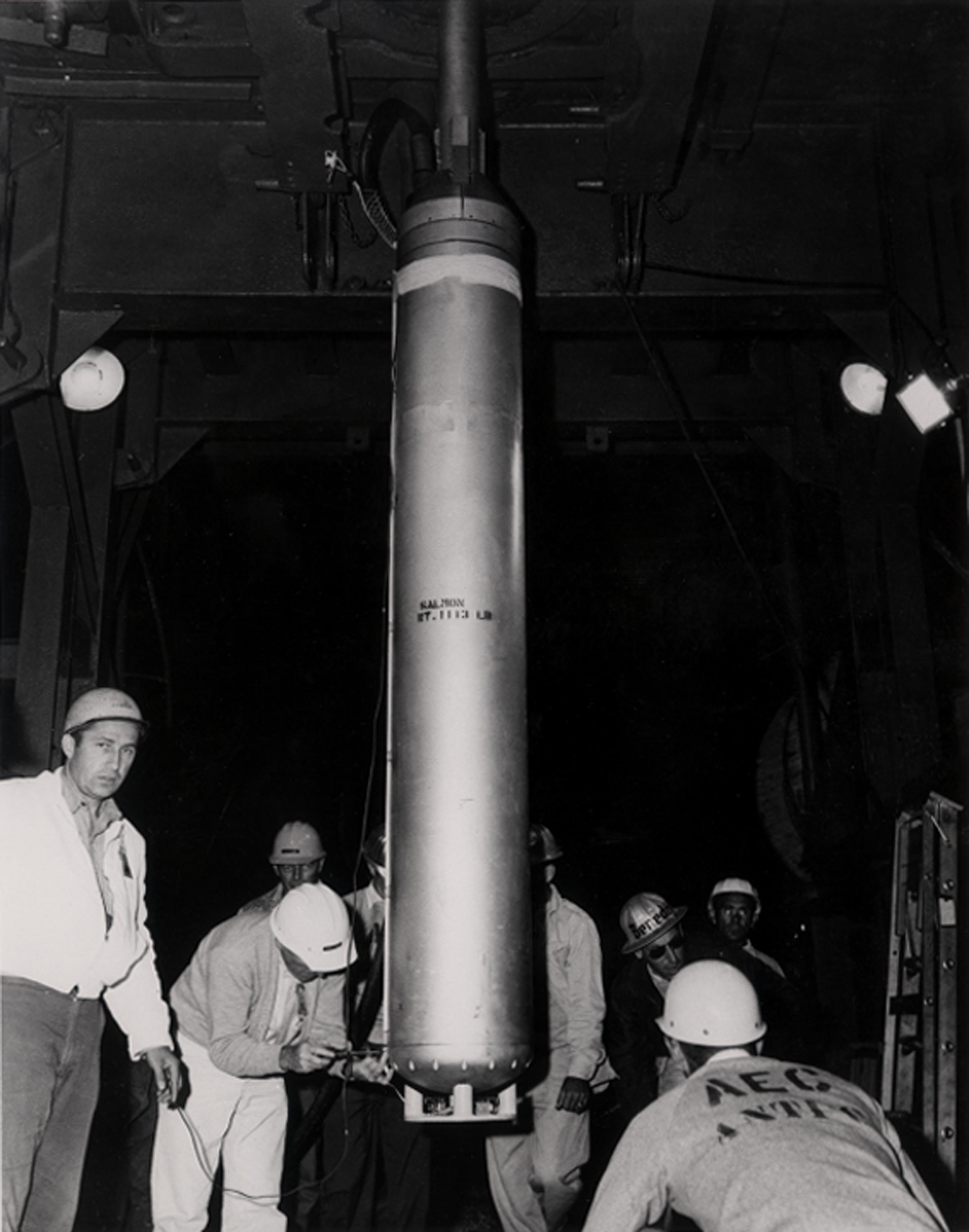
Salmon device before lowering into shot hole

The Salmon Site is a 1,470-acre (5.9 km^{2}) tract of land in Lamar County, Mississippi, near Baxterville. The tract is located over a geological formation known as the Tatum Salt Dome and is the location of the only nuclear weapons test detonations known to have been performed in the eastern United States.

Two underground detonations, a joint effort of the United States Atomic Energy Commission and the United States Department of Defense, took place under the designation of Project Dribble, part of a larger program known as Vela Uniform (aimed at assessing remote detonation detection capabilities). The first test, known as the Salmon Event, took place on October 22, 1964. It involved detonation of a 5.3 kiloton device at a depth of 2,700 feet (820 m). The second test, known as the Sterling Event, took place on December 3, 1966 and involved detonation of a 380-ton device suspended in the cavity left by the previous test. Further non-nuclear explosive tests were later conducted in the remaining cavity as part of the related Project Miracle Play.

In October 2006, responsibility for the site was transferred to the US Department of Energy's Office of Legacy Management. A plaque mounted on a short stone pillar marks the site.

On Wednesday, December 15, 2010, the United States Department of Energy transferred the Salmon Site back to the state of Mississippi. Mississippi Secretary of State Delbert Hosemann said in a press release that the majority of the 1,470 acres (590 ha) will be used for timber but an undetermined portion will be open for public access. Access to the Salmon Site had previously been restricted and monitored by the federal government since the tests were first conducted in 1964 and 1966.

A granite monument surrounded by test wells marks the site of the nuclear bomb tests, in a clearing surrounded by a Mississippi state timber preserve.

The US government gave out more than $5 million as compensation for medical problems related to the Salmon Site.

== See also ==
- Operation Whetstone
