= Operation Flintlock (nuclear test) =

Series of 1960s US nuclear tests

- Flintlock Long Shot, 80kt.

Information
- Country: United States
- Test site: Amchitka Island, Alaska; NTS Area 12, Rainier Mesa; NTS Area 15; NTS Area 16, Shoshone Mountain; NTS Area 19, 20, Pahute Mesa; NTS Areas 5, 11, Frenchman Flat; NTS, Areas 1–4, 6–10, Yucca Flat
- Period: 1965–1966
- Number of tests: 47
- Test type: underground shaft, tunnel
- Max. yield: 365 kilotonnes of TNT (1,530 TJ)

Test series chronology

The United States's Flintlock nuclear test series was a group of 47 nuclear tests conducted in 1965–1966. These tests (Note: A bomb test may be a salvo test, defined as two or more explosions "where a period of time between successive individual explosions does not exceed 5 seconds and where the burial points of all explosive devices can be connected by segments of straight lines, each of them connecting two burial points and does not exceed 40 kilometers in length". Mikhailov, V. N. "Catalog of World Wide Nuclear Testing". Begell-Atom. Archived from the original on April 26, 2014.) followed the Operation Whetstone series and preceded the Operation Latchkey series.

== Nuclear tests ==
=== Duryea ===
Following emplacement of the Duryea nuclear device and stemming of the shot hole, several instrument cables failed and a plan was devised to repair them. A shaft designated U20a1 was drilled 18 metres (59 ft) southwest of the original emplacement hole designed U12a, to a depth of 149 metres (489 ft), and then a tunnel between U12a and U12a1 was constructed, allowing for repair of the cables.

== List of nuclear tests ==
United States' Flintlock series tests and detonations
Name (Note: The US, France and Great Britain have code-named their test events, while the USSR and China did not, and therefore have only test numbers (with some exceptions – Soviet peaceful explosions were named). Word translations into English in parentheses unless the name is a proper noun. A dash followed by a number indicates a member of a salvo event. The US also sometimes named the individual explosions in such a salvo test, which results in "name1 – 1(with name2)". If test is canceled or aborted, then the row data like date and location discloses the intended plans, where known.)	Date time (UT)	Local time zone (Note: To convert the UT time into standard local, add the number of hours in parentheses to the UT time; for local daylight saving time, add one additional hour. If the result is earlier than 00:00, add 24 hours and subtract 1 from the day; if it is 24:00 or later, subtract 24 hours and add 1 to the day. Historical time zone data obtained from the IANA time zone database.)	Location (Note: Rough place name and a latitude/longitude reference; for rocket-carried tests, the launch location is specified before the detonation location, if known. Some locations are extremely accurate; others (like airdrops and space blasts) may be quite inaccurate. "~" indicates a likely pro-forma rough location, shared with other tests in that same area.)	Elevation + height (Note: Elevation is the ground level at the point directly below the explosion relative to sea level; height is the additional distance added or subtracted by tower, balloon, shaft, tunnel, air drop or other contrivance. For rocket bursts the ground level is "N/A". In some cases it is not clear if the height is absolute or relative to ground, for example, Plumbbob/John. No number or units indicates the value is unknown, while "0" means zero. Sorting on this column is by elevation and height added together.)	Delivery (Note: Atmospheric, airdrop, balloon, gun, cruise missile, rocket, surface, tower, and barge are all disallowed by the Partial Nuclear Test Ban Treaty. Sealed shaft and tunnel are underground, and remained useful under the PTBT. Intentional cratering tests are borderline; they occurred under the treaty, were sometimes protested, and generally overlooked if the test was declared to be a peaceful use.) Purpose (Note: Include weapons development, weapon effects, safety test, transport safety test, war, science, joint verification and industrial/peaceful, which may be further broken down.)	Device (Note: Designations for test items where known, "?" indicates some uncertainty about the preceding value, nicknames for particular devices in quotes. This category of information is often not officially disclosed.)	Yield (Note: Estimated energy yield in tons, kilotons, and megatons. A ton of TNT equivalent is defined as 4.184 gigajoules (1 gigacalorie).)	Fallout (Note: Radioactive emission to the atmosphere aside from prompt neutrons, where known. The measured species is only iodine-131 if mentioned, otherwise it is all species. No entry means unknown, probably none if underground and "all" if not; otherwise notation for whether measured on the site only or off the site, where known, and the measured amount of radioactivity released.)	References	Notes
Izzer	July 16, 1965 13:04:24.1	PST (–8 hrs)	NTS Area U9bp 37.11495°N 116.03304°W	1,273 m (4,177 ft) – 163.68 m (537.0 ft)	underground shaft, weapons development		less than 20 kt	Venting detected		
Pongee	July 22, 1965 13:21:08.11	PST (–8 hrs)	NTS Area U2ah 37.13175°N 116.06773°W	1,274 m (4,180 ft) – 135.03 m (443.0 ft)	underground shaft, weapons development		less than 20 kt	Venting detected on site, 6 Ci (220 GBq)		
Bronze	July 23, 1965 17:00:00.04	PST (–8 hrs)	NTS Area U7f 37.09794°N 116.03374°W	1,257 m (4,124 ft) – 530.96 m (1,742.0 ft)	underground shaft, weapons development		67 kt	Venting detected, 1.7 kCi (63 TBq)		
Mauve	August 6, 1965 17:23:30.04	PST (–8 hrs)	NTS Area U3dp 37.01771°N 116.04089°W	1,185 m (3,888 ft) – 321 m (1,053 ft)	underground shaft, weapons development		18 kt			
Ticking	August 21, 1965 13:43:08.15	PST (–8 hrs)	NTS Area U9bj 37.11258°N 116.02689°W	1,288 m (4,226 ft) – 210.31 m (690.0 ft)	underground shaft, weapons development		250 t	Venting detected, 2.6 kCi (96 TBq)		
Centaur	August 27, 1965 13:51:13.11	PST (–8 hrs)	NTS Area U2ak 37.13729°N 116.07097°W	1,283 m (4,209 ft) – 171.91 m (564.0 ft)	underground shaft, weapons development		1 kt	Venting detected on site, 57 Ci (2,100 GBq)		
Moa - 1 (with Screamer)	September 1, 1965 20:08:00.04	PST (–8 hrs)	NTS Area U3ed 37.0373°N 116.01472°W	1,194 m (3,917 ft) + N/A	underground shaft, weapons development		2.5 kt	Venting detected on site		simultaneous, separate.
Screamer - 2 (with Moa)	September 1, 1965 20:08:00.04	PST (–8 hrs)	NTS Area U3dg 37.02292°N 116.00987°W	1,184 m (3,885 ft) – 301.9 m (990 ft)	underground shaft, weapon effect		9 kt	Venting detected on site, 63 kCi (2,300 TBq)		simultaneous, separate.
Elkhart	September 17, 1965 15:08:23.1	PST (–8 hrs)	NTS Area U9bs 37.11098°N 116.03548°W	1,267 m (4,157 ft) – 219.46 m (720.0 ft)	underground shaft, weapons development		6 kt	Venting detected, 560 Ci (21,000 GBq)		
Long Shot	October 29, 1965 21:00:00.08	NST (–11 hrs)	Amchitka Island, Alaska 51.43709°N 179.18032°E	42 m (138 ft) – 700 m (2,300 ft)	underground shaft, joint verification		80 kt			Designed to test detection of underground nuclear tests; see Vela Uniform.
Sepia	November 12, 1965 18:00:00.05	PST (–8 hrs)	NTS Area U3en 37.04996°N 116.02282°W	1,202 m (3,944 ft) – 241.19 m (791.3 ft)	underground shaft, weapons development		7 kt	I-131 venting detected, 0.0011 Ci (0.041 GBq)		
Kermet	November 23, 1965 18:17:32.1	PST (–8 hrs)	NTS Area U2c 37.16187°N 116.0718°W	1,304 m (4,278 ft) – 198.12 m (650.0 ft)	underground shaft, weapons development		500 t	Venting detected on site, 18 Ci (670 GBq)		
Corduroy	December 3, 1965 15:13:02.1	PST (–8 hrs)	NTS Area U10k 37.1646°N 116.05319°W	1,275 m (4,183 ft) – 681.53 m (2,236.0 ft)	underground shaft, weapons development		120 kt	Venting detected, 1.2 kCi (44 TBq)		
Emerson	December 16, 1965 15:39:18.15	PST (–8 hrs)	NTS Area U2al 37.14079°N 116.06405°W	1,280 m (4,200 ft) – 259.87 m (852.6 ft)	underground shaft, weapons development		3 kt	Venting detected on site, 0.6 Ci (22 GBq)		
Buff	December 16, 1965 19:15:00.04	PST (–8 hrs)	NTS Area U3dh 37.07251°N 116.02998°W	1,223 m (4,012 ft) – 500.41 m (1,641.8 ft)	underground shaft, weapons development		51 kt			
Maxwell	January 13, 1966 15:37:43.1	PST (–8 hrs)	NTS Area U9br 37.11617°N 116.0284°W	1,283 m (4,209 ft) – 183.09 m (600.7 ft)	underground shaft, weapons development		less than 20 kt	Venting detected, 3 Ci (110 GBq)		
Lampblack	January 18, 1966 18:35:00.04	PST (–8 hrs)	NTS Area U7i 37.09165°N 116.01956°W	1,267 m (4,157 ft) – 561.48 m (1,842.1 ft)	underground shaft, weapons development		38 kt			
Sienna	January 18, 1966 18:35:00.04	PST (–8 hrs)	NTS Area U3cj 37.03726°N 116.01922°W	1,193 m (3,914 ft) – 275.01 m (902.3 ft)	underground shaft, weapons development		4 kt	Venting detected		
Dovekie	January 21, 1966 18:28:00.04	PST (–8 hrs)	NTS Area U3cd 37.0318°N 116.01649°W	1,189 m (3,901 ft) – 333.05 m (1,092.7 ft)	underground shaft, weapons development		7 kt			
Reo	January 22, 1966 15:17:19.1	PST (–8 hrs)	NTS Area U10m 37.15718°N 116.03959°W	1,283 m (4,209 ft) – 213.36 m (700.0 ft)	underground shaft, weapons development		150 t	Venting detected on site, 10 Ci (370 GBq)		
Plaid 2	February 3, 1966 18:17:37.1	PST (–8 hrs)	NTS Area U2r 37.12626°N 116.07034°W	1,272 m (4,173 ft) – 270.05 m (886.0 ft)	underground shaft, weapons development		3.5 kt	Venting detected on site, 7 Ci (260 GBq)		
Rex	February 24, 1966 15:55:07.04	PST (–8 hrs)	NTS Area U20h(e) 37.27178°N 116.43472°W	1,971 m (6,467 ft) – 671.69 m (2,203.7 ft)	underground shaft, weapons development		19 kt	Venting detected, 310 Ci (11,000 GBq)		
Red Hot	March 5, 1966 18:15:00.1	PST (–8 hrs)	NTS Area U12g.06 37.17445°N 116.20924°W	2,299 m (7,543 ft) – 405.38 m (1,330.0 ft)	tunnel, weapon effect		2 kt	Venting detected off site, 1 MCi (37 PBq)		
Cinnamon - 2 (with Finfoot)	March 7, 1966 18:41:00.04	PST (–8 hrs)	NTS Area U3dm 37.03461°N 116.03166°W	1,192 m (3,911 ft) + N/A	underground shaft, safety experiment		less than 20 kt	Venting detected on site		simultaneous, separate.
Finfoot - 1 (with Cinnamon)	March 7, 1966 18:41:00.07	PST (–8 hrs)	NTS Area U3du 37.03736°N 116.03014°W	1,193 m (3,914 ft) – 195.54 m (641.5 ft)	underground shaft, weapons development		5 kt	I-131 venting detected, 0		simultaneous, separate.
Clymer	March 12, 1966 18:04:13.11	PST (–8 hrs)	NTS Area U9ce 37.14362°N 116.0534°W	1,266 m (4,154 ft) – 397.09 m (1,302.8 ft)	underground shaft, weapons development		3 kt	Venting detected, 450 Ci (17,000 GBq)		
Purple	March 18, 1966 19:00:00.04	PST (–8 hrs)	NTS Area U3ds 37.0092°N 116.00996°W	1,180 m (3,870 ft) – 332.79 m (1,091.8 ft)	underground shaft, weapons development		7 kt			
Templar	March 24, 1966 14:55:28.14	PST (–8 hrs)	NTS Area U9bt 37.11329°N 116.03223°W	1,275 m (4,183 ft) – 151 m (495 ft)	underground shaft, peaceful research		370 t	I-131 venting detected, 0		Plowshare – excavation device development.
Lime	April 1, 1966 18:40:00.04	PST (–8 hrs)	NTS Area U7j 37.10265°N 116.02081°W	1,291 m (4,236 ft) – 561.44 m (1,842.0 ft)	underground shaft, weapons development		less than 20 kt			
Stutz	April 6, 1966 13:57:17.1	PST (–8 hrs)	NTS Area U2ca 37.13941°N 116.14203°W	1,458 m (4,783 ft) – 225.34 m (739.3 ft)	underground shaft, weapons development		5 kt	Venting detected, 1 Ci (37 GBq)		
Tomato	April 7, 1966 22:27:30.04	PST (–8 hrs)	NTS Area U3ek 37.01737°N 115.99309°W	1,195 m (3,921 ft) – 226.31 m (742.5 ft)	underground shaft, weapons development		6 kt			
Duryea	April 14, 1966 14:13:43.1	PST (–8 hrs)	NTS Area U20a 37.2425°N 116.43192°W	1,960 m (6,430 ft) – 544.25 m (1,785.6 ft)	underground shaft, weapons development		70 kt	Venting detected, 2 Ci (74 GBq)		
Fenton	April 23, 1966 14:55:26.14	PST (–8 hrs)	NTS Area U2m1 37.16052°N 116.08381°W	1,321 m (4,334 ft) – 167.64 m (550.0 ft)	underground shaft, weapons development		1.4 kt	Venting detected off site, 1.7 kCi (63 TBq)		
Pin Stripe	April 25, 1966 18:38:00.14	PST (–8 hrs)	NTS Area U11b 36.8874°N 115.94159°W	1,066 m (3,497 ft) – 295.66 m (970.0 ft)	underground shaft, weapon effect		5 kt	Venting detected off site, 210 kCi (7,800 TBq)		
Ochre	April 29, 1966 13:33:00.04	PST (–8 hrs)	NTS Area U3ec 37.04364°N 116.02323°W	1,196 m (3,924 ft) – 126.14 m (413.8 ft)	underground shaft, safety experiment		less than 20 kt			
Traveler	May 4, 1966 13:32:17.09	PST (–8 hrs)	NTS Area U2cd 37.13705°N 116.13807°W	1,430 m (4,690 ft) – 196.76 m (645.5 ft)	underground shaft, weapons development		20 kt	Venting detected, 170 Ci (6,300 GBq)		
Cyclamen	May 5, 1966 14:00:00.04	PST (–8 hrs)	NTS Area U3cx 37.05056°N 116.03873°W	1,203 m (3,947 ft) – 304.97 m (1,000.6 ft)	underground shaft, weapons development		12 kt			included heavy element experiment.
Chartreuse	May 6, 1966 15:00:00.08	PST (–8 hrs)	NTS Area U19d 37.34795°N 116.32283°W	2,064 m (6,772 ft) – 666.75 m (2,187.5 ft)	underground shaft, weapons development		73 kt			
Tapestry	May 12, 1966 19:37:26.2	PST (–8 hrs)	NTS Area U2an 37.13423°N 116.07198°W	1,281 m (4,203 ft) – 247.19 m (811.0 ft)	underground shaft, weapons effects		10 kt	Venting detected on site, 8.6 kCi (320 TBq)		Objects exposed to the device's effects included Mk2 reentry bodies for the Polaris program and Mk12 reentry bodies for the Minuteman program.
Piranha	May 13, 1966 13:30:00.04	PST (–8 hrs)	NTS Area U7e 37.08681°N 116.03431°W	1,237 m (4,058 ft) – 548.72 m (1,800.3 ft)	underground shaft, weapons development		120 kt			
Dumont	May 19, 1966 13:56:28.14	PST (–8 hrs)	NTS Area U2t 37.11109°N 116.05879°W	1,252 m (4,108 ft) – 670.77 m (2,200.7 ft)	underground shaft, weapons development		200 kt	Venting detected, 35 Ci (1,300 GBq)		
Discus Thrower	May 27, 1966 20:00:00.04	PST (–8 hrs)	NTS Area U8a 37.17834°N 116.09862°W	1,380 m (4,530 ft) – 337.06 m (1,105.8 ft)	underground shaft, weapon effect		22 kt			
Pile Driver	June 2, 1966 15:30:00.09	PST (–8 hrs)	NTS Area U15a.01 37.22701°N 116.0564°W	1,525 m (5,003 ft) – 462.69 m (1,518.0 ft)	underground shaft, weapon effect		62 kt	Venting detected on site, 37 kCi (1,400 TBq)		Investigate the simulated effects of a nuclear surface detonation on a deeply buried, superhard command and control center in a granite rock formation.
Tan	June 3, 1966 14:00:00.04	PST (–8 hrs)	NTS Area U7k 37.06843°N 116.03606°W	1,213 m (3,980 ft) – 560.68 m (1,839.5 ft)	underground shaft, weapons development		160 kt			
Puce	June 10, 1966 14:30:00.04	PST (–8 hrs)	NTS Area U3bs 37.05937°N 116.03967°W	1,208 m (3,963 ft) – 485.55 m (1,593.0 ft)	underground shaft, weapons development		less than 20 kt			
Double Play	June 15, 1966 17:00:00.04	PST (–8 hrs)	NTS Area U16a.03 37.00959°N 116.20382°W	1,954 m (6,411 ft) – 327.7 m (1,075 ft)	underground shaft, weapon effect		less than 20 kt	Venting detected off site, 840 kCi (31,000 TBq)		
Kankakee	June 15, 1966 18:02:47.13	PST (–8 hrs)	NTS Area U10p 37.17148°N 116.04973°W	1,281 m (4,203 ft) – 455.25 m (1,493.6 ft)	underground shaft, weapons development		200 kt	Venting detected, 160 Ci (5,900 GBq)		
Vulcan	June 25, 1966 17:13:00.07	PST (–8 hrs)	NTS Area U2bd 37.15535°N 116.07312°W	1,300 m (4,300 ft) – 322.11 m (1,056.8 ft)	underground shaft, peaceful research		25 kt	Venting detected, 250 Ci (9,200 GBq)		Project Plowshare - Device development, heavy element production.
Halfbeak	June 30, 1966 22:15:00.07	PST (–8 hrs)	NTS Area U19b 37.31575°N 116.29985°W	2,043 m (6,703 ft) – 819.3 m (2,688 ft)	underground shaft, weapons development		365 kt			
