= Operation Touchstone =

Series of 1980s US nuclear tests

Touchstone
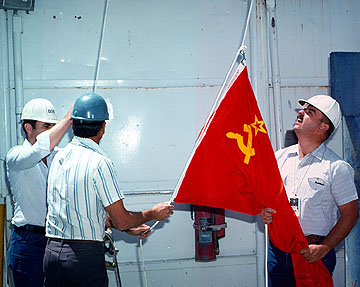
- A Soviet flag is raised next to an American flag at the Nevada Test Site as part of the Joint Verification Experiment

Information
- Country: United States
- Test site: NTS Area 12, Rainier Mesa; NTS Area 19, 20, Pahute Mesa; NTS, Areas 1–4, 6–10, Yucca Flat
- Period: 1987–1988
- Number of tests: 13
- Test type: underground shaft, tunnel
- Max. yield: 150 kilotonnes of TNT (630 TJ)

Test series chronology

The United States's Touchstone nuclear test series was a group of 13 nuclear tests conducted in 1987–1988. These tests (Note: A bomb test may be a salvo test, defined as two or more explosions "where a period of time between successive individual explosions does not exceed 5 seconds and where the burial points of all explosive devices can be connected by segments of straight lines, each of them connecting two burial points and does not exceed 40 kilometers in length".Mikhailov, V. N. "Catalog of World Wide Nuclear Testing". Begell-Atom. Archived from the original on April 26, 2014.) followed the Operation Musketeer series and preceded the Operation Cornerstone series.

== Joint Verification Experiment (JVE) ==
The series included Touchstone Kearsarge, a joint US-Soviet test as part of the Joint Verification Experiment (JVE). The JVE's purpose was to provide yield data to both parties about each other's nuclear test sites so that accurate remote measurements could be taken to verify each other's compliance with the Threshold Test Ban Treaty (TTBT).

== List of the nuclear tests ==
United States' Touchstone series tests and detonations
| Name (Note: The US, France and Great Britain have code-named their test events, while the USSR and China did not, and therefore have only test numbers (with some exceptions – Soviet peaceful explosions were named). Word translations into English in parentheses unless the name is a proper noun. A dash followed by a number indicates a member of a salvo event. The US also sometimes named the individual explosions in such a salvo test, which results in "name1 – 1(with name2)". If test is canceled or aborted, then the row data like date and location discloses the intended plans, where known.) | Date time (UT) | Local time zone (Note: To convert the UT time into standard local, add the number of hours in parentheses to the UT time; for local daylight saving time, add one additional hour. If the result is earlier than 00:00, add 24 hours and subtract 1 from the day; if it is 24:00 or later, subtract 24 hours and add 1 to the day. Historical time zone data obtained from the IANA time zone database.) | Location (Note: Rough place name and a latitude/longitude reference; for rocket-carried tests, the launch location is specified before the detonation location, if known. Some locations are extremely accurate; others (like airdrops and space blasts) may be quite inaccurate. "~" indicates a likely pro-forma rough location, shared with other tests in that same area.) | Elevation + height (Note: Elevation is the ground level at the point directly below the explosion relative to sea level; height is the additional distance added or subtracted by tower, balloon, shaft, tunnel, air drop or other contrivance. For rocket bursts the ground level is "N/A". In some cases it is not clear if the height is absolute or relative to ground, for example, Plumbbob/John. No number or units indicates the value is unknown, while "0" means zero. Sorting on this column is by elevation and height added together.) | Delivery (Note: Atmospheric, airdrop, balloon, gun, cruise missile, rocket, surface, tower, and barge are all disallowed by the Partial Nuclear Test Ban Treaty. Sealed shaft and tunnel are underground, and remained useful under the PTBT. Intentional cratering tests are borderline; they occurred under the treaty, were sometimes protested, and generally overlooked if the test was declared to be a peaceful use.) Purpose (Note: Include weapons development, weapon effects, safety test, transport safety test, war, science, joint verification and industrial/peaceful, which may be further broken down.) | Device (Note: Designations for test items where known, "?" indicates some uncertainty about the preceding value, nicknames for particular devices in quotes. This category of information is often not officially disclosed.) | Yield (Note: Estimated energy yield in tons, kilotons, and megatons. A ton of TNT equivalent is defined as 4.184 gigajoules (1 gigacalorie).) | Fallout (Note: Radioactive emission to the atmosphere aside from prompt neutrons, where known. The measured species is only iodine-131 if mentioned, otherwise it is all species. No entry means unknown, probably none if underground and "all" if not; otherwise notation for whether measured on the site only or off the site, where known, and the measured amount of radioactivity released.) | References | Notes |
|---|---|---|---|---|---|---|---|---|---|---|
| Borate | October 23, 1987 16:00:00.09 | PST (–8 hrs) | NTS Area U2ge 37.14185°N 116.07957°W | 1,294 m (4,245 ft) – 542.5 m (1,780 ft) | underground shaft, weapons development | | 38 kt | I-131 venting detected, 0 | | |
| Waco | December 1, 1987 16:30:00.09 | PST (–8 hrs) | NTS Area U3lu 36.99636°N 116.00533°W | 1,176 m (3,858 ft) – 182.9 m (600 ft) | underground shaft, weapons development | | less than 20 kt | | | |
| Mission Cyber | December 2, 1987 16:00:00.084 | PST (–8 hrs) | NTS Area U12p.02 37.2346°N 116.16425°W | 1,926 m (6,319 ft) – 270.6 m (888 ft) | tunnel, weapon effect | | 2 kt | | | |
| Kernville | February 15, 1988 18:10:00.089 | PST (–8 hrs) | NTS Area U20ar 37.31431°N 116.47253°W | 1,899 m (6,230 ft) – 541.6 m (1,777 ft) | underground shaft, weapons development | | 60 kt | | | |
| Abilene | April 7, 1988 17:15:00.078 | PST (–8 hrs) | NTS Area U3mn 37.01311°N 116.04519°W | 1,187 m (3,894 ft) – 245.06 m (804.0 ft) | underground shaft, weapons development | | 2 kt | | | |
| Schellbourne | May 13, 1988 15:35:00.108 | PST (–8 hrs) | NTS Area U2gf 37.12439°N 116.073°W | 1,268 m (4,160 ft) – 463 m (1,519 ft) | underground shaft, weapons development | | 16 kt | Venting detected, 22 Ci (810 GBq) | | |
| Laredo | May 21, 1988 22:30:00.14 | PST (–8 hrs) | NTS Area U3mh 37.03245°N 115.98814°W | 1,220 m (4,000 ft) – 351.4 m (1,153 ft) | underground shaft, weapons development | | 3.5 kt | | | |
| Comstock | June 2, 1988 13:00:00.088 | PST (–8 hrs) | NTS Area U20ay 37.26008°N 116.44197°W | 1,960 m (6,430 ft) – 620.3 m (2,035 ft) | underground shaft, weapons development | | 80 kt | Venting detected | | |
| Nightingale - 2 (with Rhyolite) | June 22, 1988 14:00:00.079 | PST (–8 hrs) | NTS Area U2ey 37.16611°N 116.07312°W | 1,309 m (4,295 ft) – 237.7 m (780 ft) | underground shaft, safety experiment | | less than 150 kt | | | Simultaneous, separate holes. |
| Rhyolite - 1 (with Nightengale) | June 22, 1988 14:00:00.079 | PST (–8 hrs) | NTS Area U2ey 37.16611°N 116.07312°W | 1,309 m (4,295 ft) – 207.3 m (680 ft) | underground shaft, weapons development | | less than 150 kt | | | Simultaneous, separate holes. |
| Alamo | July 7, 1988 15:05:30.07 | PST (–8 hrs) | NTS Area U19au 37.25239°N 116.37756°W | 1,964 m (6,444 ft) – 622.1 m (2,041 ft) | underground shaft, weapons development | | 150 kt | | | |
| Kearsarge | August 17, 1988 17:00:00.095 | PST (–8 hrs) | NTS Area U19ax 37.2971°N 116.30742°W | 2,102 m (6,896 ft) – 615.7 m (2,020 ft) | underground shaft, weapons development | | 140 kt | | | The American part of the Joint Verification Experiment. |
| Harlingen - 1 | August 23, 1988 18:30:00.08 | PST (–8 hrs) | NTS Area U6g 36.99113°N 116.01887°W | 1,175 m (3,855 ft) – 289.6 m (950 ft) | underground shaft, weapons development | | 2 kt | | | Simultaneous, separate holes. |
| Harlingen - 2 | August 23, 1988 18:30:00.08 | PST (–8 hrs) | NTS Area U6h 36.98868°N 116.01876°W | 1,175 m (3,855 ft) + | underground shaft, weapons development | | less than 20 kt | | | Simultaneous, separate holes. |
| Bullfrog | August 30, 1988 18:00:00.089 | PST (–8 hrs) | NTS Area U4au 37.08593°N 116.06925°W | 1,236 m (4,055 ft) – 489.2 m (1,605 ft) | underground shaft, weapons development | | 33 kt | Venting detected, 4 Ci (150 GBq) | | |
