= Nevada Test Site =

US Department of Energy reservation in Nevada

Nevada National Security Site
- Nevada Test Site
- Nye County in Nevada; Near Las Vegas, Nevada in United States
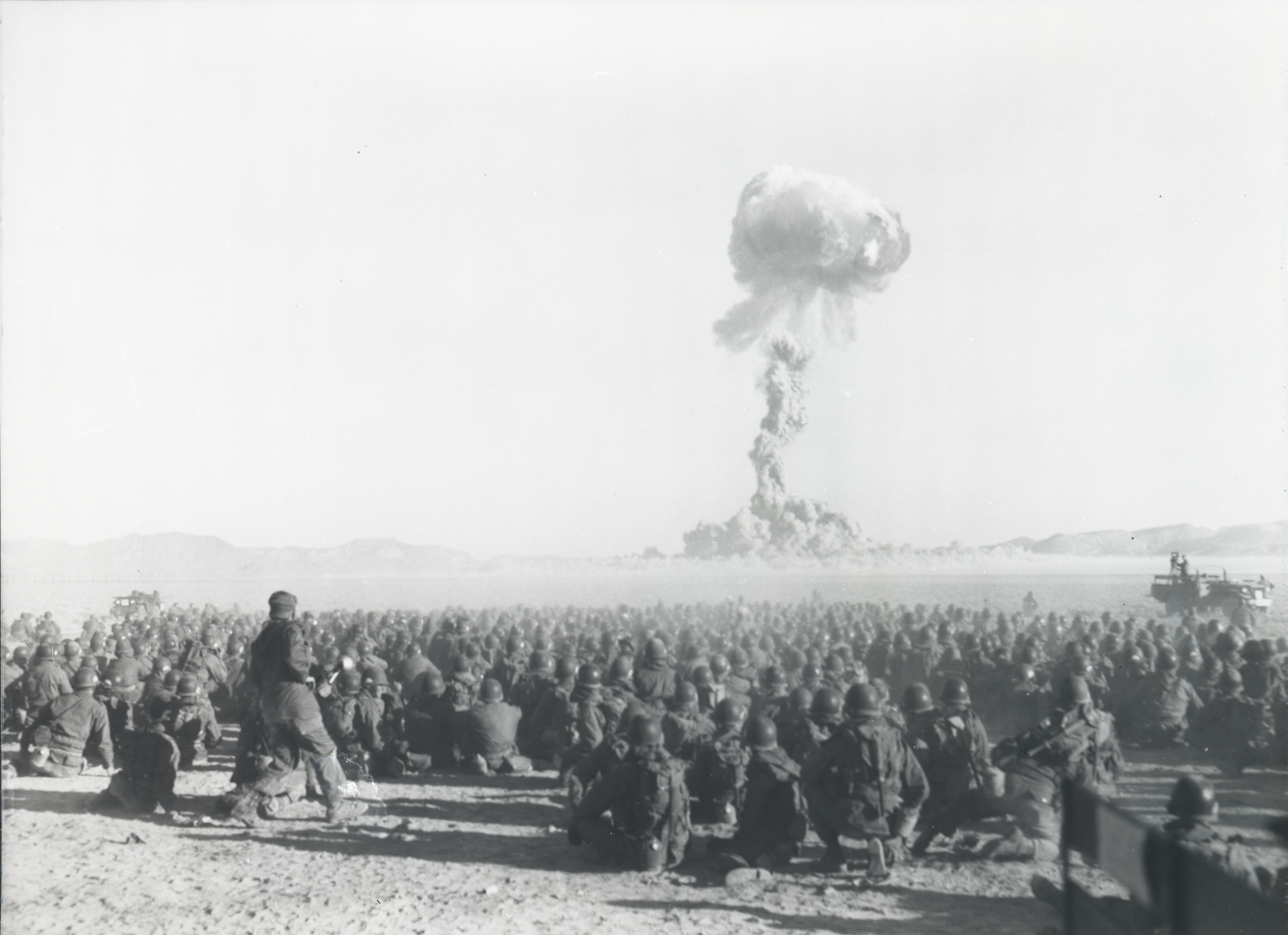
- A November 1951 nuclear test at Nevada Test Site, Operation Buster–Jangle "Dog". It had a yield of 21 kilotons of TNT (88 TJ), and was the first U.S. nuclear field exercise conducted with live troops maneuvering on land. Troops shown are 6 mi (10 km) from the blast.

Site information
- Type: Nuclear Weapons Research Complex
- Owner: Government of the United States
- Operator: United States Department of Energy
- Controlled by: National Nuclear Security Administration
- Open to the public: No
- Status: Active
- Defining authority: United States Geological Survey (For geography, ground waters, terrains and mapping)

Location
- Map showing location of the site
- Coordinates: 37°07′N 116°03′W
- Area: 1,350 sq mi (3,500 km^{2})

Site history
- Built: 1951
- In use: 1951–Present

Test information
- Nuclear tests: 928

The Nevada National Security Site (NNSS; N2S2) initially named the Nevada Proving Ground (1951–1955), and later the Nevada Test Site (NTS; 1955–2010)) is a reservation of the United States Department of Energy located in the southeastern portion of Nye County, Nevada, approximately 65 mi (105 km) northwest of Las Vegas.

The site was established in December 1950 when President Harry S. Truman authorized the designation of a portion of the Nellis Air Force Gunnery and Bombing Range for testing American nuclear devices by the US Atomic Energy Commission (AEC).

The first atmospheric test was conducted at the site's Frenchman Flat area by the AEC on January 27, 1951. About 928 nuclear tests were conducted here through 1992, when the United States stopped its underground nuclear testing.

The site consists of about 1,350 sq mi (3,500 km^{2}) of desert and mountainous terrain. Some 1,100 buildings in 28 areas are connected by 400 mi (640 km) of paved roads, 300 mi (480 km) of unpaved roads, ten heliports, and two airstrips. The site is privately managed and operated by Mission Support and Test Services LLC, a joint venture of Honeywell, Jacobs, and Huntington Ingalls, on behalf of the National Nuclear Security Administration (NNSA).

The mushroom clouds from the 100 atmospheric tests were visible from almost 100 mi (160 km) away; they could be seen from the Las Vegas Strip in the early 1950s. Many iconic images at nuclear science museums throughout the United States come from the site. Las Vegas experienced noticeable seismic effects. Westerly winds routinely carried the fallout from atmospheric nuclear tests, increasing rates of cancer in Utah and elsewhere, according to a 1984 medical report.

The site has hosted 536 publicized and organized anti-nuclear protests, with 37,488 participants and 15,740 involved in arrests, according to government records.

== History ==
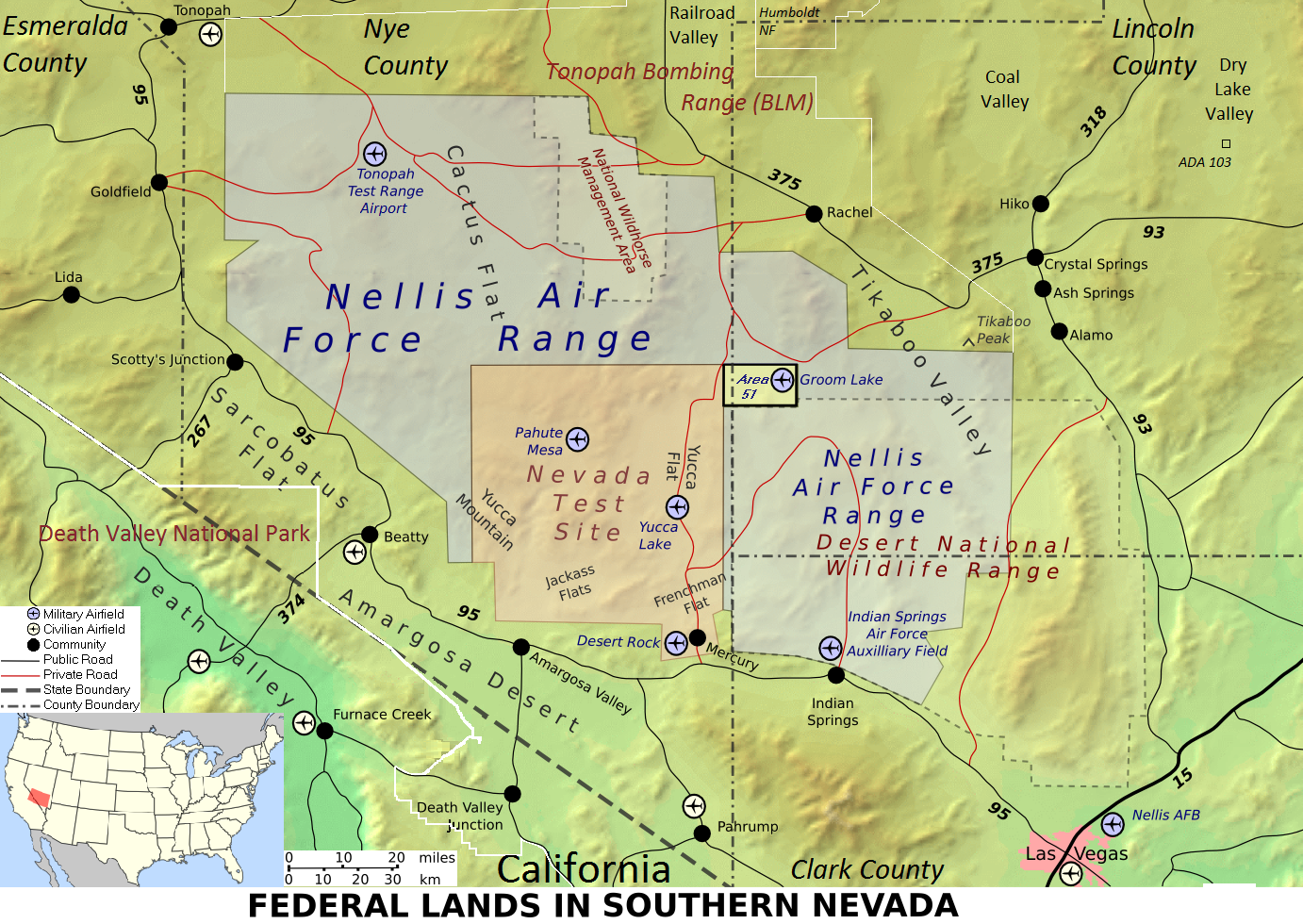
A map that details the federal land in southern Nevada, showing the site

The site was established as a 680-square-mile (1,800 km^{2}) area by President Harry S. Truman on December 18, 1950, within the Nellis Air Force Gunnery and Bombing Range.

=== 1951–1992 ===
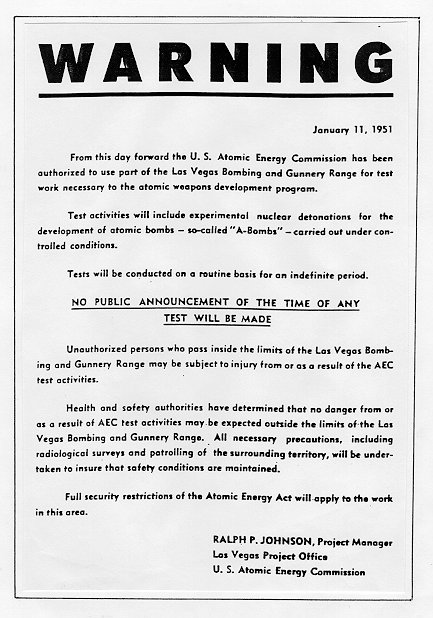
This handbill was distributed 16 days before the first nuclear device was detonated at the site.

The site was the primary testing location of American nuclear devices from 1951 to 1992; 928 announced nuclear tests occurred there. Of those, 828 were underground (62 of the underground tests included multiple, simultaneous nuclear detonations, adding 93 detonations and bringing the total number of NTS nuclear detonations to 1,021, of which 921 were underground). The site contains many subsidence craters from the testing.

The site was the United States' primary location for tests smaller than 1 Mt (4.2 PJ). One hundred twenty-six tests were conducted elsewhere, including most larger tests. Many of these occurred at the Pacific Proving Grounds in the Marshall Islands.

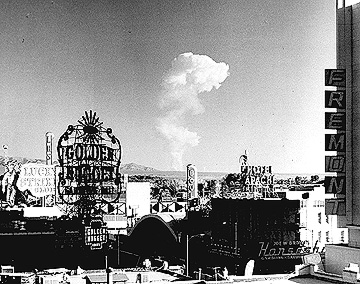
Mushroom cloud seen from downtown Las Vegas.

During the 1950s, the mushroom clouds from atmospheric tests could be seen for almost 100 mi (160 km). The city of Las Vegas experienced noticeable seismic effects, and the distant mushroom clouds, which could be seen from the downtown hotels, became tourist attractions. The last atmospheric test detonation at the site was "Little Feller I" of Operation Sunbeam, on July 17, 1962.

Although the United States did not ratify the Comprehensive Nuclear-Test-Ban Treaty, it honors the articles of the treaty, and underground testing of weapons ended as of September 23, 1992. Subcritical tests not involving a critical mass continued.

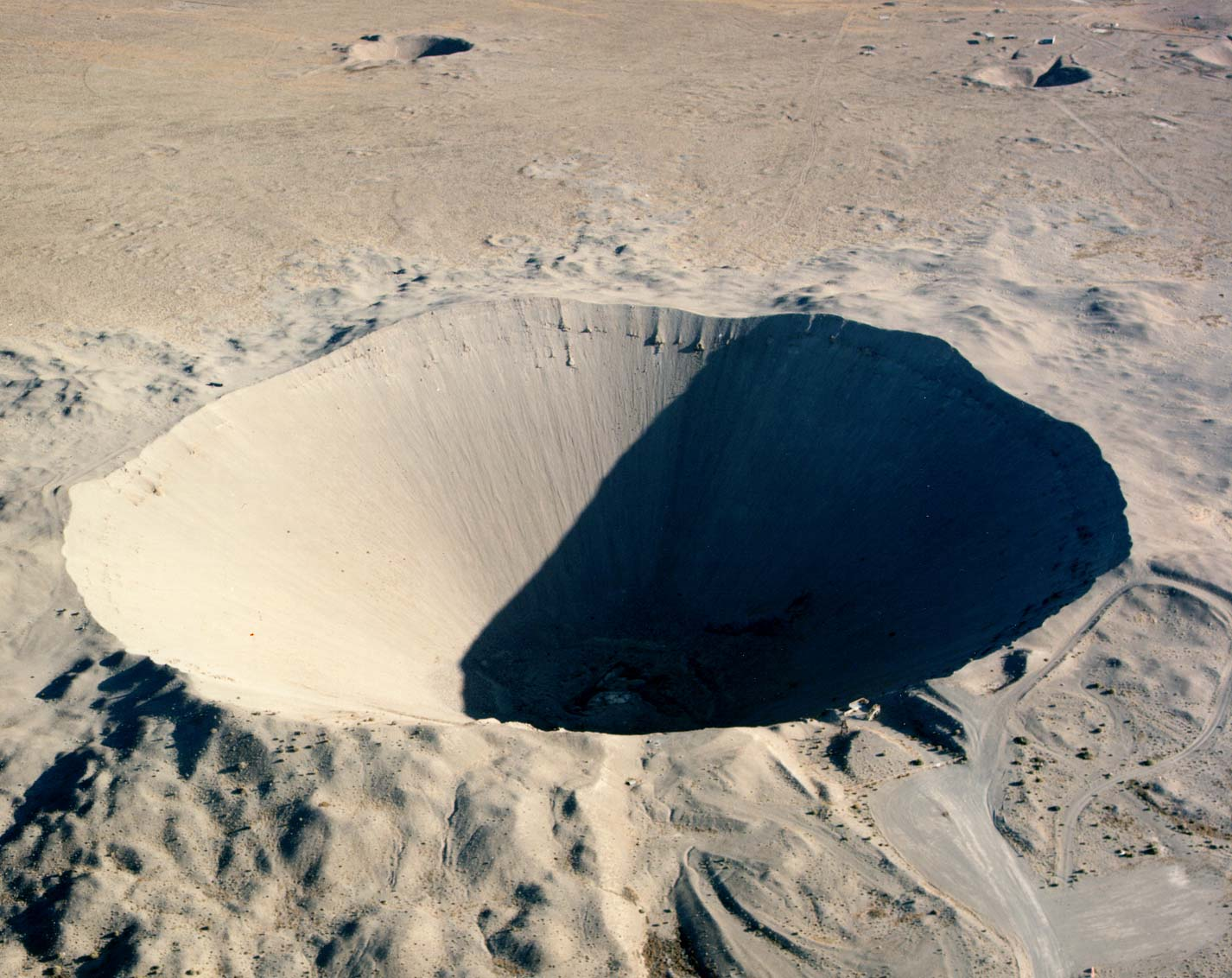
Sedan crater

One notable test shot was the "Sedan" shot of Operation Storax on July 6, 1962, a 104-kiloton-of-TNT (440 TJ) shot for Operation Plowshare, which sought to prove that nuclear weapons could be used for peaceful means in creating bays or canals. It created a crater 1,280 feet (390 m) wide and 320 feet (100 m) deep.

=== 1992–present ===
More than 27 subcritical tests have been conducted at the site.

In 2018, the State of Nevada sued the federal government to block a plan to ship "more than a metric ton" of plutonium to the site for temporary storage.

In 2022, the government acknowledged that 13,625 cubic meters of radioactive material conforming to its disposal criteria had been shipped to the site for disposal.

== Destruction and survivability testing ==
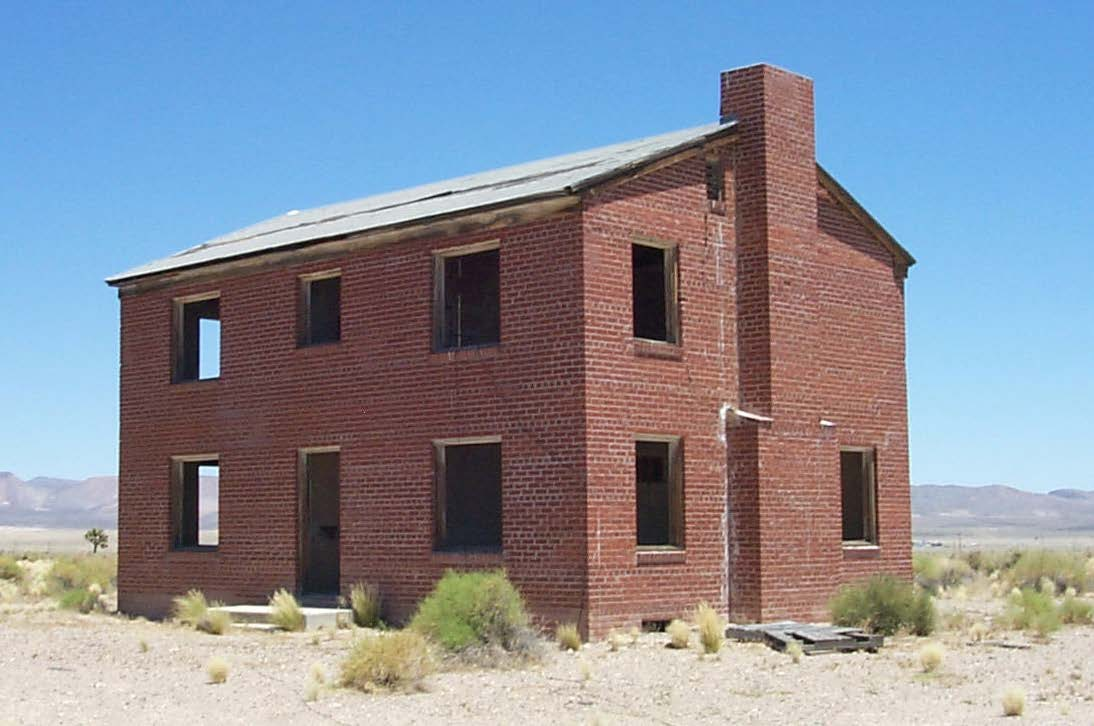
This model two-story house was constructed 10,500 feet (3,200 m) away from the ground-zero of the Apple-2 nuclear test.

Testing of the various effects of detonation of nuclear weapons was carried out during above-ground tests. Many kinds of vehicles (ranging from cars to aircraft), nuclear-fallout and standard bomb-shelters, public-utility stations and other building structures and equipment were placed at measured distances away from "ground zero", the spot on the surface immediately under or over the center of the blast. Operation Cue tested civil defense measures. Such civilian and commercial effects testing was done with many of the atomic tests of Operation Greenhouse on Eniwetok Atoll, Operation Upshot-Knothole and Operation Teapot at the site.

Homes and commercial buildings of many different types and styles were built to standards typical of American and (less-often) European cities. Other such structures included military fortifications (of types used by both NATO and the Soviet-led Warsaw Pact) and civil-defense as well as "backyard"-type shelters. In such a typical test, several of the same buildings and structures might be built using the same layouts and plans with different types of materials, paints, general landscaping, cleanliness of the surrounding yards, wall-angles or varying distances from ground zero. Mannequins were placed in and around the test vehicles and buildings, aside from some left out in the open, for testing clothing and shock effects.

High-speed cameras were placed in protected locations to capture effects of radiation and shock waves. Typical imagery from these cameras shows paint boiling off the buildings, which are then pushed violently away from ground zero by the shock wave before being drawn toward the detonation by the suction caused by the climbing mushroom cloud. Footage from these cameras has become iconic, used in various media and available in the public domain.

This testing allowed the development of Civil Defense guidelines, distributed to the public, to increase the likelihood of survival in case of air- or spaceborne nuclear attack.

== Environmental impact ==
Each of the below-ground explosions—some as deep as 5,000 feet (1.5 km)—vaporized a large chamber, leaving a cavity filled with radioactive rubble. About a third of the tests were conducted directly in aquifers, and others were hundreds or thousands of feet below the water table.

When underground explosions ended in 1992, the Department of Energy estimated that more than 300 megacuries (11 EBq) of radioactivity remained in the environment at that time, making the site one of the most contaminated locations in the United States. In the most seriously affected zones, the concentration of radioactivity in groundwater reaches millions of picocuries per liter. (The federal standard for drinking water is 20 picocuries per liter (0.74 Bq/L).) Although radioactivity levels in the water continue to decline over time, the longer-lived isotopes like plutonium or uranium could pose risks for thousands of years.

The Department of Energy has more than 48 monitoring wells at the site. Because the contaminated water poses no immediate health threat, the department ranked the site as low priority for clean-up. In 2009, tritium with a half-life of 12.3 years was first detected in groundwater off-site in Pahute Mesa, near the locations of the 1968 Benham and 1975 Tybo tests.

The DOE issues an annual environmental monitoring report containing data from the monitoring wells both on and off site.

Janice C. Beatley started to study the botany of the Nevada test site in 1962 when she created 68 study sites. The intention had been to study the effect of radiation on the plants but this plan had to be changed when the United States abandoned atmospheric testing in 1963. The sites however became important because they recorded long term change through 1980. Much of her data was never published; however it was all transferred to the United States Geological Survey after her death. It was "an ideal place to conduct long-term ecosystem research."

== Protests and demonstrations ==
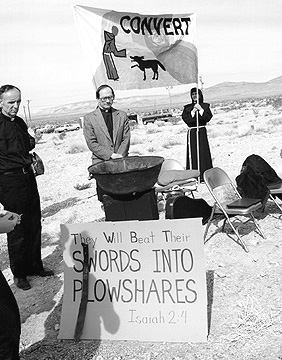
Members of Desert Lenten Experience hold a prayer vigil during the Easter period of 1982 at the entrance to the site.

In 1983, four Greenpeace activists made the first incursion into the site of an active test. Two American men, one from West Germany and one from the United Kingdom hiked 30 miles on foot to hide in the desert near ground zero at Yucca Flats. The four evaded capture for a week with the stated objective of delaying the test, and were charged with trespassing.

From 1986 through 1994, two years after the United States ended nuclear weapons testing, 536 demonstrations were held at the site involving 37,488 participants and 15,740 arrests, according to government records.

In 1986, a coalition of organizations including Greenpeace sent protestors into Frenchman's Flat.

On February 5, 1987, more than 400 people were arrested trying to enter the site after nearly 2,000 demonstrators held a rally to protest nuclear weapons testing. Those arrested included the astronomer Carl Sagan and the actors Kris Kristofferson, Martin Sheen, and Robert Blake. Five Democratic members of Congress attended the rally: Thomas J. Downey, Mike Lowry, Jim Bates, Leon E. Panetta, and Barbara Boxer.

American Peace Test (APT) and Nevada Desert Experience (NDE) held most of these. In March 1988, APT held an event where more than 8,000 people attended a ten-day action to "Reclaim the Test Site", where nearly 3,000 people were arrested, including more than 1,200 in one day. This set a record for most civil disobedience arrests in a single protest.

On October 12, 1992, an 11-day protest took place at the Test Site. At the invitation of the Western Shoshone Tribe and Corbin Harney, an anti-nuclear activist and spiritual leader for the Newe people, over 2,000 protesters from 12 different countries gathered for "Healing Global Wounds". In their media work, protesters and organizers demanded an end to nuclear weapons testing and return of the test site to the Western Shoshone people. Camped in the desert, participants took part in anti-racism and peaceful civil disobedience trainings. They planned actions and demonstrations, eventually using culverts and other means to enter the Test Site where 530 were arrested by Wackenhut Security forces on charges of trespassing. Full-scale nuclear weapons testing did not resume.

After 1994, Shundahai Network in cooperation with Nevada Desert Experience and Corbin Harney continued the protests of the work at the site and staged efforts to stop a repository for highly radioactive waste adjacent to the test site at nearby Yucca Mountain.

== Modern usage ==
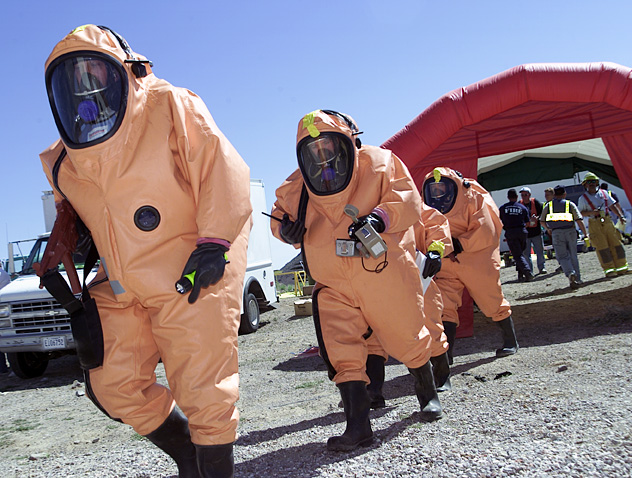
WMD/counter-terrorism training exercise at the site.

The site continues to be used for nuclear weapons research and development. This includes subcritical testing. These tests are conducted jointly by Los Alamos National Laboratory, Lawrence Livermore National Laboratory, and the British Atomic Weapons Establishment. A recent one was Ediza (2019), and Nightshade A (2020).

The site offers monthly public tours, often booked months in advance. Visitors are not allowed to bring cameras, binoculars, or cell phones, nor are they permitted to pick up rocks for souvenirs.

While there are no longer any explosive tests of nuclear weapons at the site, there is still testing done to determine the viability of the United States' aging nuclear arsenal. Additionally, the site is the location of the Area 5 Radioactive Waste Management Complex, which sorts and stores low-level radioactive waste that is not transuranic and has a half-life of less than 20 years.

The Radiological/Nuclear WMD Incident Exercise Site (T-1) replicates multiple terrorist radiological incidents with train, plane, automobile, truck, and helicopter props. It is located in Area 1, at the former site of tests EASY, SIMON, APPLE-2, and GALILEO.

== Landmarks and geography ==
A table of interesting places in and around the NNSS is presented here, which corresponds with many of the descriptions in the Nevada Test Site Guide.

Interesting locations in the NNSS
Name	Location	Notes
Mercury	Area 23 36.6594°N 115.99642°W	The base housing and office area for the site.
Principal Underground Laboratory for Subcritical Experimentation (PULSE), formerly known as U1a	Area 1 37.00819°N 116.05894°W	PULSE, formerly known as U1a, is an underground laboratory used for physics experiments that obtain technical information about the U.S. nuclear weapons stockpile. U1h and U1g, shafts which add data access, ventilation and other utilities to the facility, are just north of this entrance.
Industrial area	Area 1 37.06561°N 116.13411°W	Houses $20 million worth of mining tools; contains an area for creating site grout and stemming mixes.
Doomtown	Area 5 36.79805°N 115.93416°W	The original effects test area and close cousin to Survival City in Area 1.
EPA's NTS Dairy	Area 15 37.20829°N 116.04037°W	A dairy and pig farm maintained from 1964 to 1984 by the EPA, mainly to provide experimental data for uptake of milk contamination, following Operation Schooner.
Yucca Mountain nuclear waste repository	Area 25 36.85282°N 116.42672°W	Yucca Mountain radioactive disposal site. This is the north entrance; the south entrance is about 1.7 miles (2.7 km) SSW.
A Tunnel	Area 16 37.01245°N 116.19565°W	Shoshone Mountain, Tunnel A Entrance.
B Tunnel	Area 12 37.19345°N 116.19887°W	Rainier Mesa, Tunnel B Entrance.
C, D, and F Tunnels	Area 12 37.19322°N 116.19999°W	Rainier Mesa, tunnels C, D, and F Entrances – separate, but very close together.
E Tunnel	Area 12 37.18816°N 116.19477°W	Rainier Mesa, Tunnel E Entrance.
G Tunnel	Area 12 37.1694°N 116.1947°W	Rainier Mesa, Tunnel G Entrance.
I Tunnel	Area 12 37.21876°N 116.16036°W	Rainier Mesa, Tunnel I Entrance.
J Tunnel	Area 12 37.21884°N 116.16319°W	Rainier Mesa, Tunnel J Entrance.
K Tunnel	Area 12 37.21878°N 116.15891°W	Rainier Mesa, Tunnel K Entrance.
N Tunnel	Area 12 37.20169°N 116.19187°W	Rainier Mesa, Tunnel N Entrance.
P Tunnel	Area 12 37.22906°N 116.1535°W	Rainier Mesa, Tunnel P Entrance.
T Tunnel	Area 12 37.21589°N 116.16711°W	Rainier Mesa, Tunnel T Entrance.
X Tunnel	Area 25 36.74542°N 116.32816°W	Two tunnel entrances, used by the U.S. Army Ballistic Research Laboratory for depleted uranium testing.
Operation Icecap	Area 7 37.0808°N 116.04558°W	Operation Icecap was being built up when the 1992 Comprehensive Test Ban was signed. The equipment was left in place, including the .5 million pounds (230,000 kg) instrumentation payload, the crane, the wiring, and many of the recording trailers.
Operation Gabbs	Area 2 37.13796°N 116.07353°W	Operation Gabbs was another shaft detonation scheduled for 1993 that was laid to rest by the '92 test ban treaty.
Operation Greenwater	Area 20 37.23086°N 116.44725°W	The third suspended test was Operation Greenwater, the test of the space X-Ray laser system, a part of the Star Wars concept. The 45 metres (148 ft) tower remains on the site.
Survival City	Area 1 37.05305°N 116.10339°W	The alternative to Doomtown. Used in the Teapot Desert/Rock exercises, and the Civil Defence/PR effort Operation Cue. Name taken from "News of the Day" newsreel about the Apple 2 test.
Fortune Training Area	Area 1 36.98689°N 116.04384°W	Fortune was a training facility for building bomb test sites. Site reused for Unicorn test in 2005–06.
Divine Strake	Area 16 37.02245°N 116.18203°W	U16b tunnel entrance complex, including Divine Strake proposed 700t chemical blast tunnel on the north, the latter heavily protested, delayed, and eventually abandoned.
Plutonium Valley	Area 11 36.97659°N 115.96228°W	Area contains scattered raw plutonium from plutonium dispersal safety tests.
Original BREN Tower	Area 4 37.09869°N 116.09685°W	Original site of the Bare Reactor Experiment in Nevada (BREN), a reactor on a tower which emulated bomb explosions for medical studies. A Japanese village was constructed around it because it focused on war bomb injuries. BREN was later moved to Area 25.
BREN Tower	Area 25 36.78062°N 116.24358°W	The BREN (Bare Reactor Experiment, Nevada) is a 453 m (1,486 ft) tall tower originally in Yucca Flat, used to experimentally irradiate ground targets with gamma and neutrons. Moved to Jackass Flat, for HENRE (High Energy Neutrons Action Experiment) and demolished in 2012.
Nerva Test Stand	Area 25 36.83162°N 116.27809°W	Test stand for the "Nerva" nuclear rocket.
KIWI-TNT	Area 25 36.83285°N 116.27914°W	Test of the Nerva engine to destruction, to determine worst-case scenario for runaway reactor. 1.6 Mci released.
DAF	Area 6 36.89827°N 116.04814°W	Device Assembly Facility: bombs and components are made ready for testing here.
RWMS-5	Area 5 36.85758°N 115.9551°W	Radioactive Waste Management Facility, Area 5
E-MAD Building	Area 25 36.80646°N 116.30476°W	Engine Maintenance and Disassembly Building, used for handling radioactive NERVA engines; site being dismantled.
R-MAD Building	Area 25 36.8161°N 116.23936°W	Reactor Maintenance and Disassembly Building, maintained radioactive NERVA reactors. Also used in the MX program; site being dismantled.
ETS-1 Test Stand	Area 25 36.8321°N 116.31217°W	Engineering Test Stand 1, a stand for testing nuclear rockets in a standard upright position.
MX Testing Area	Area 25 36.69946°N 116.37952°W	MX missile test track and silo
JASPER	Area 27 36.77496°N 116.11703°W	Houses the Joint Actinide Shock Physics Experimental Research, a two-stage light-gas gun for shock experiments.
Camp 12	Area 12 37.19598°N 116.15624°W	Camp for miners and others working on the Rainier Mesa in the '70s.
BEEF	Area 4 37.09611°N 116.09262°W	Big Explosives Experimental Facility. Explosive testing facility utilized by Los Alamos National Laboratory personnel deployed to the NNSS.
Area 3 RWMS	Area 3 37.04445°N 116.02425°W	Low level Radioactive Waste Management Facility. Waste (mostly dirt) is buried in a selection of old subsidence craters.
Atlas Pulse Power	Area 6 36.97946°N 116.03965°W	The Atlas Pulse Power Facility
Apple-2 houses	Area 1 37.04434°N 116.07397°W	Three "typical American" houses built for the Apple-2 civil defense event. The one on the left is 1.5 miles (2.4 km) from the 29kt blast, the right one 2 miles (3.2 km). The left one is on the monthly tour bus route. The two towers are from later seismic studies.
News Nob	Area 6 36.945°N 116.05°W	The location from which VIPs and news people would watch nuclear tests.
Annie Emplacement	Area 5 36.7128°N 115.9673°W	Location of "Atomic Annie" (M65 280mm nuclear field artillery) emplacement for Upshot-Knothole Grable test.
BACHUS Site	Area 12 37.19569°N 116.1584°W	Biotechnology Activity Characterization by Unconventional Signatures, a biowarfare simulation facility.
Rad/NucCTEC	Area 6 36.89026°N 116.03093°W	Radiological/Nuclear Countermeasures Test and Evaluation Complex Homeland Security operational nuclear test and training center
Project Pluto	Area 26 36.81744°N 116.14906°W	Ram-jet nuclear-powered cruise missile engine development project; site being dismantled.
Lockheed-Martin AOF	Area 6 36.92692°N 116.00755°W	Aerial Operations Facility; a testing area for UAVs.
Camp Desert Rock	Area 22 36.62593°N 116.01937°W	The Army Camp that housed the participants in Operations Desert Rock I-VIII. Across the road is the Pig Hilton, where test subjects were housed.
Test Control Point	Area 6 36.93453°N 116.05482°W	NTS Test control center (CP-1). These two buildings controlled the tests performed at the site.
NNSS-CTOS	Area 1 37.05263°N 116.10308°W	Counter Terrorism Operations Support, a location for training in emergency preparedness in radiological emergencies.
Super Kukla	Area 27 36.77907°N 116.11041°W	A naked reactor test area designed to test equipment under a hostile radioactive environment, 1965–78.
Bleachers	Area 5 36.7014°N 115.9731°W	Bleacher area for viewing of Frenchman Flat events.(14 Atmospheric Tests)
BODF	Area 4 37.08068°N 116.08697°W	Buried Objects Detection Facility, area to test and calibrate mine sweeping equipment against buried objects.
Gun Turret USS Louisville	Area 2 37.13945°N 116.10904°W	Used in calibration of Whitney, Shasta, Diablo and Smoky tests. Made of "old" steel from 1940s U.S. heavy cruiser (USS Louisville CA 28) damaged from kamikaze on January 5, 1945; it was "aimed" at the shot cab to get radiation data.
Hazmat Spill Facility	Area 5 36.80138°N 115.95075°W	Hazmat Spill Test Facility – used to test Hazmat strategies and tactics. Became the Nonproliferation Test and Evaluation Complex in 2005.
RBIFF	Area 26 36.81645°N 116.16486°W	Re-entry Body Impact Fuze Flights
Ship of the Desert	Area 5 36.87486°N 115.92957°W	A massive tracked structure designed to capture neutrons from the Diagonal Line experiment.
Rock Valley Study	Area 25 36.68406°N 116.19397°W	The circles are the Rock Valley Study Area, environmental research area for studying radiation in the desert ecosystem.
Climax Mine	Area 15 37.22352°N 116.05895°W	Location of an old silver mine, recycled for three nuclear tests and the Spent Fuel Test in which spent nuclear fuel was stored in a mine drift to study the effects on the granite walls.
The Forest	Area 5 36.795°N 115.951°W	The famous forest on the desert, swept by the blasts of Encore and Grable.
The House in the Middle	Area 5 36.788757°N 115.954654°W	1954 short documentary from the Encore test. A clean, freshly painted house might save your home in a nuclear attack.

== Cancer and test site ==
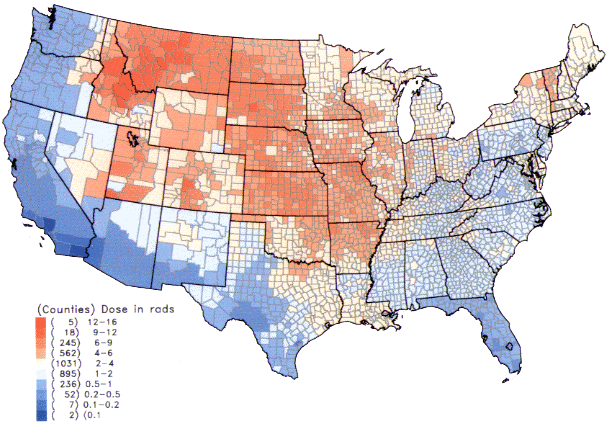
Iodine-131 fallout exposure in rads

Many communities east of the Nevada Test Site, including Cedar City, Enterprise, and St. George, Utah, received fallout from above-ground nuclear testing in the Yucca Flats at the site. Winds routinely carried the fallout of these tests directly through St. George and southern Utah. Marked increases in cancers such as leukemia, lymphoma, thyroid cancer, breast cancer, melanoma, bone cancer, brain tumors, and gastrointestinal tract cancers were reported from the mid-1950s through 1980.

On May 19, 1953, the 32-kiloton (130 TJ) atomic bomb (nicknamed "Harry") was detonated at the site. The bomb later gained the name "Dirty Harry" because of the amount of off-site fallout generated by the bomb.

A 1962 United States Atomic Energy Commission report found that "children living in St. George, Utah may have received doses to the thyroid of radioiodine as high as 120 to 440 rads" (1.2 to 4.4 Gy). A 1979 study reported in the New England Journal of Medicine concluded that:

A significant excess of leukemia deaths occurred in children up to 14 years of age living in Utah between 1959 and 1967. This excess was concentrated in the cohort of children born between 1951 and 1958, and was most pronounced in those residing in counties receiving high fallout.

In 1982, a lawsuit brought by nearly 1,200 people accused the government of negligence in atomic and/or nuclear weapons testing at the site, which they said had caused leukemia and other cancers. Dr. Karl Z. Morgan, Director of Health Physics at Oak Ridge National Laboratory, testified that radiation protection measures in the tests were substandard to best practices at the time.

In a report by the National Cancer Institute, released in 1997, it was determined that 90 atmospheric tests at the site deposited high levels of radioactive iodine-131 (5.5 exabecquerels) across much of the contiguous United States, especially in the years 1952, 1953, 1955, and 1957 – doses large enough, it claimed, to produce 10,000 to 75,000 cases of thyroid cancer. The Radiation Exposure Compensation Act of 1990 allowed for people living downwind of the site for at least two years in particular Nevada, Arizona, or Utah counties, between January 21, 1951, and October 31, 1958, or June 30 and July 31, 1962, and suffering from certain cancers or other serious illnesses deemed to have been caused by fallout exposure to receive compensation of $50,000. By 2014, over 28,000 downwinder claims for a total compensation of $1.9 billion had been processed. Additionally, the Energy Employees Occupational Illness Compensation Program Act of 2000 provides compensation and medical benefits for nuclear weapons workers who may have developed certain work-related illnesses.

Uranium miners, mill workers, and ore transporters are also eligible for $100,000 compassionate payment under the Radiation Exposure Compensation Program, while $75,000 is the fixed payment amount for workers who were participants in the above-ground nuclear weapons tests.

== Nuclear test series carried out at the site ==
- Operation Ranger – 1951
- Operation Buster–Jangle – 1951
- Operation Tumbler–Snapper – 1952
- Operation Upshot–Knothole – 1953
- Operation Teapot – 1955
- Project 56 – 1955
- Operation Plumbbob – 1957
- Project 57, Project 58/58A – 1957–1958
- Operation Hardtack II – 1958
- Operation Nougat – 1961–1962
- Operation Plowshare – 1961–1973 (sporadic, at least one test a year)
- Operation Sunbeam (aka Dominic II) – 1962
- Operation Storax – 1963
- Operation Niblick – 1963–1964
- Operation Whetstone – 1964–1965
- Operation Flintlock – 1965–1966
- Operation Latchkey – 1966–1967
- Operation Crosstie – 1967–1968
- Operation Bowline – 1968–1969
- Operation Mandrel – 1969–1970
- Operation Emery – 1970
- Operation Grommet – 1971–1972
- Operation Toggle – 1972–1973
- Operation Arbor – 1973–1974
- Operation Bedrock – 1974–1975
- Operation Anvil – 1975–1976
- Operation Fulcrum – 1976–1977
- Operation Cresset – 1977–1978
- Operation Quicksilver – 1978–1979
- Operation Tinderbox – 1979–1980
- Operation Guardian – 1980–1981
- Operation Praetorian – 1981–1982
- Operation Phalanx – 1982–1983
- Operation Fusileer – 1983–1984
- Operation Grenadier – 1984–1985
- Operation Charioteer – 1985–1986
- Operation Musketeer – 1986–1987
- Operation Touchstone – 1987–1988
- Operation Cornerstone – 1988–1989
- Operation Aqueduct – 1989–1990
- Operation Sculpin – 1990–1991
- Operation Julin – 1991–1992

== Areas ==
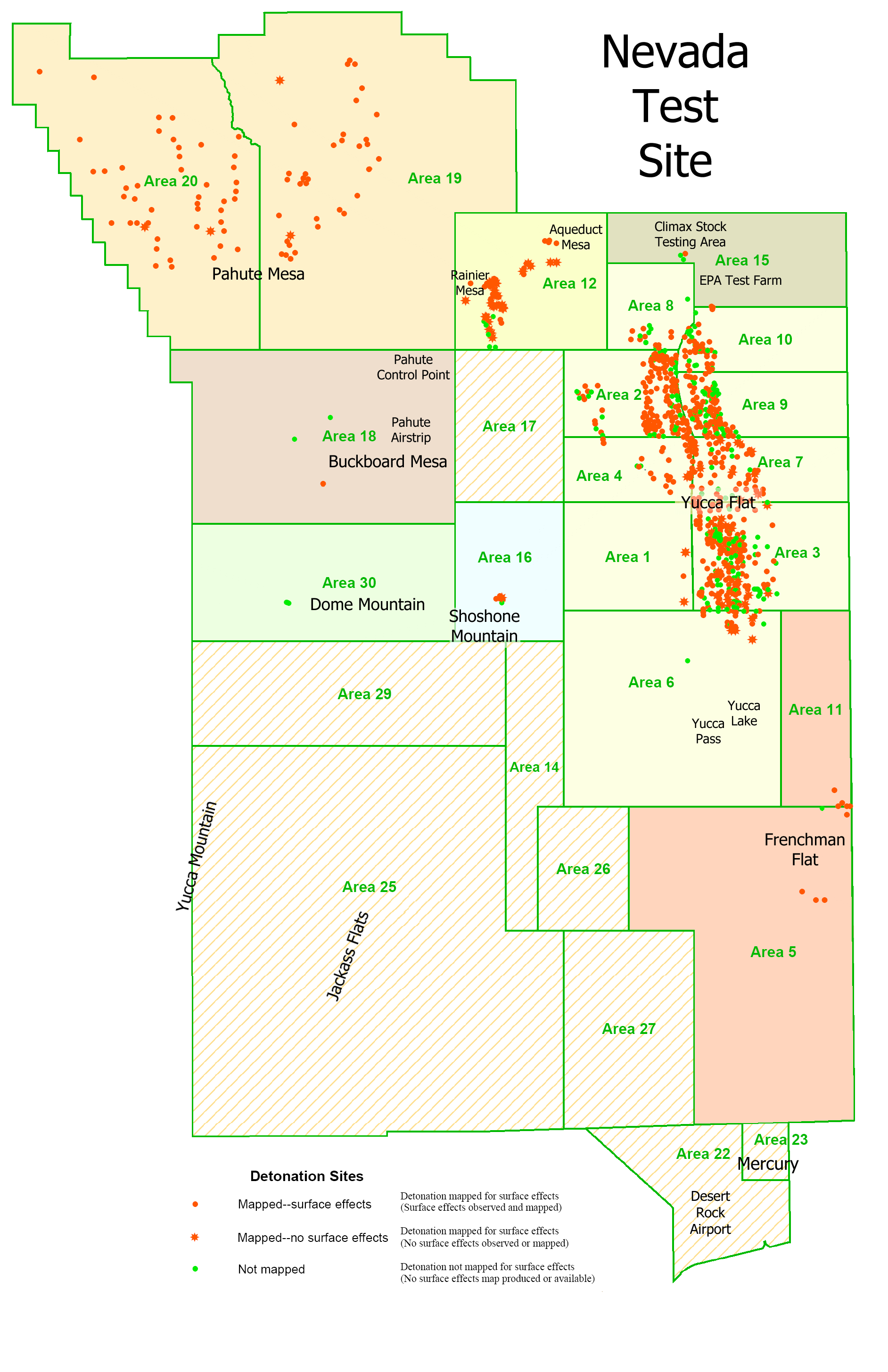
Nuclear explosions in various areas of the site

The site is broken down into areas. Some of the areas and their uses include the following:

=== Area 1 ===
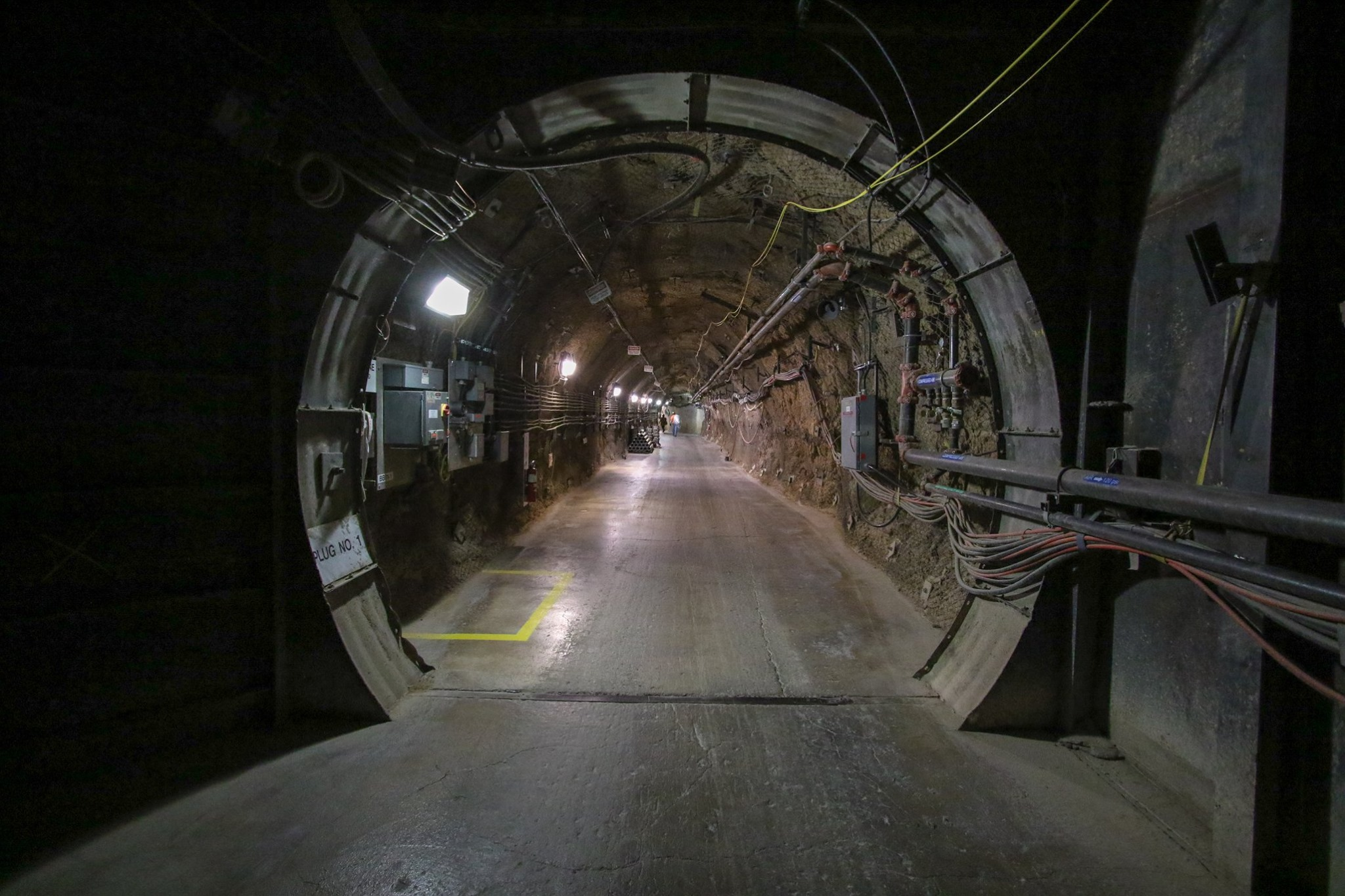
Tunnel in the U1a Complex within Area 1

Area 1 held eight nuclear tests for a total of nine detonations. Four early atmospheric tests were conducted above Area 1 in the early 1950s, as well as three underground tests in 1971 and 1990. In 1955, a Civil Defense experiment (called Operation Cue in the press) studied nuclear blast effects on various building types; a few structures still stand.

Heavy drilling equipment and concrete construction facilities are sited in Area 1. Non-destructive X-ray, gamma ray, and subcritical detonation tests continue to be conducted in Area 1.

The radioactivity present on the ground in Area 1 provides a radiologically contaminated environment for the training of first responders.

=== Area 2 ===
Area 2 was the site of 144 tests comprising 169 detonations. A test named "Gabbs" was intended for early 1993 but was cancelled in 1992 due to a pre-emptive halt to testing based on the Comprehensive Nuclear-Test-Ban Treaty.

=== Area 3 ===
Area 3 held 266 nuclear tests for a total of 288 detonations, including Upshot-Knothole 'Harry', more than in any other area of the site.

As part of Operation Tinderbox, on June 24, 1980, a large satellite prototype (DSCS III) was subjected to radioactivity from the "Huron King" shot in a vertical line-of-sight (VLOS) test undertaken in Area 3. This was a program to improve the database on nuclear hardening design techniques for defense satellites.

The final nuclear test detonation at site was Operation Julin's "Divider" on September 23, 1992, just prior to the moratorium ending all nuclear testing. Divider was a safety experiment test shot that was detonated at the bottom of a shaft sunk into Area 3.

In 1995 and 1997, plutonium-contaminated soil from "Double Tracks" and "Clean Slate 1" of Operation Roller Coaster (1963) was picked up from the Tonopah Test Range and brought to the Area 3 Radioactive Waste Management Site as a first step in eventually returning Tonopah Test Range to an environmentally neutral state. Corrective action regarding the contaminated material from the "Clean Slate 2" and "Clean Slate 3" tests has yet to be agreed upon.

=== Area 4 ===
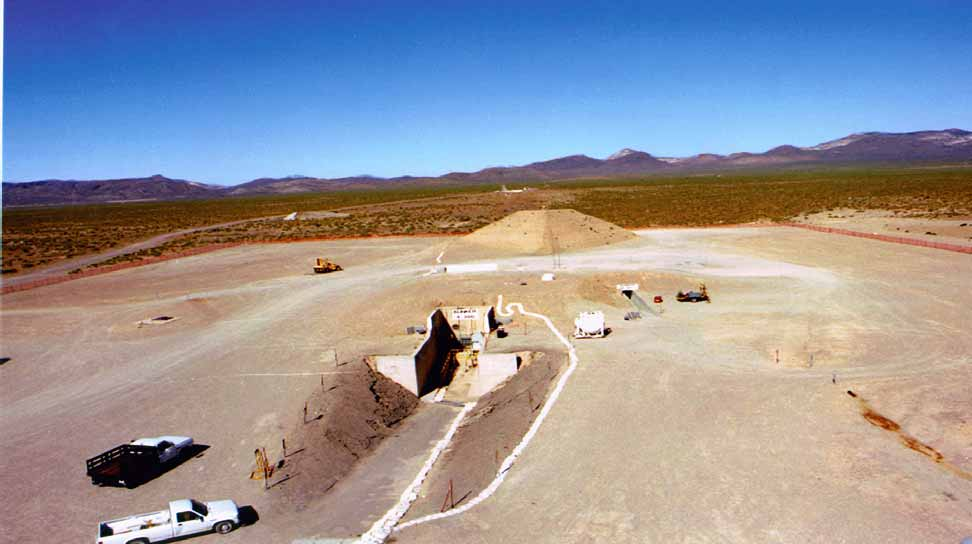
Big Explosives Experimental Facility (BEEF) in Area 4

Area 4 held 40 nuclear tests for a total of 44 detonations.

It is home to the Big Explosives Experimental Facility (BEEF).

=== Area 5 ===
Area 5 held 19 nuclear tests. Five atmospheric tests were detonated, starting on January 27, 1951, at Area 5 as part of Operation Ranger. These were the first nuclear tests at the site. Further tower detonations were studied at Area 5, and the Grable shot which was fired from a M65 Atomic Cannon located in Area 11 exploded in Area 5. The Priscilla test was conducted at Area 5 on June 24, 1957.

Five underground tests were set up at Area 5; four of those included accidental release of radioactive materials. On March 16, 1968, physicist Glenn T. Seaborg toured the upcoming Milk Shake shot of Operation Crosstie. Milk Shake's radioactive release was not detected outside of the site's boundaries.

=== Area 6 ===
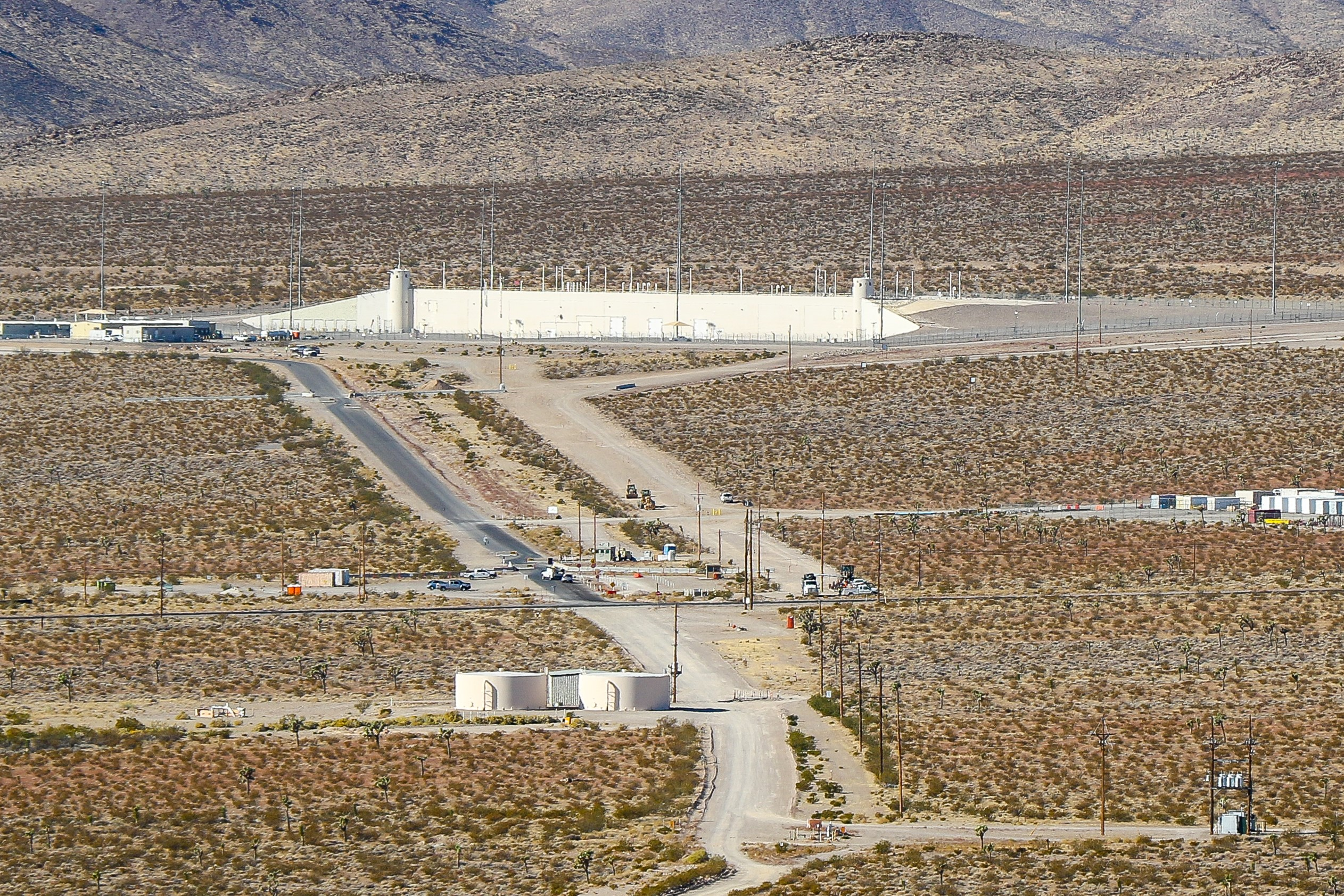
Device Assembly Facility in Area 6

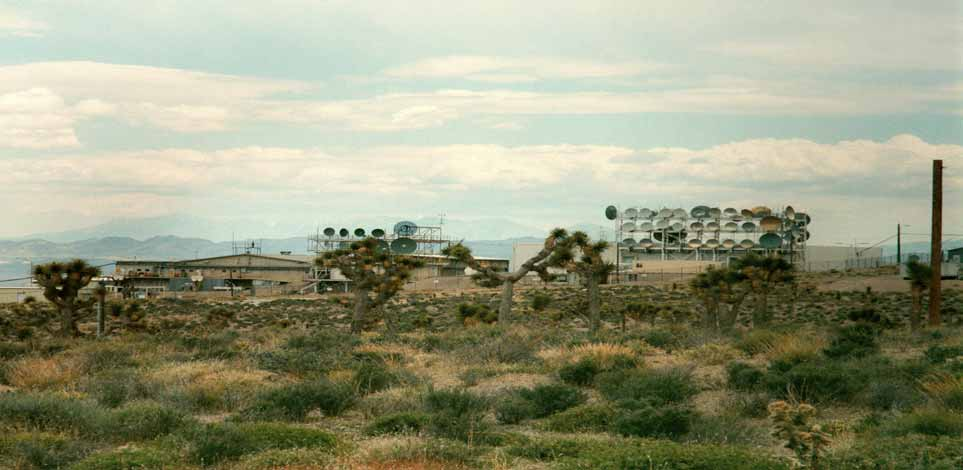
Control Point in Area 6

Area 6 held four nuclear tests for a total of six detonations. The area features an asphalt runway, that was constructed on top of a dirt landing strip, that had existed since the 1950s. Some buildings, including a hangar, are situated near the runway.

The Device Assembly Facility (DAF) was originally built to consolidate nuclear explosives assembly operations. It now serves as the Criticality Experiments Facility (CEF).

The Control Point is the communication hub of the site. It was used by controllers to trigger and monitor nuclear test explosions.

In 1982, while a live nuclear bomb was being lowered underground, the base came under attack by armed combatants. The combatants turned out to be a security team conducting an improperly scheduled drill.

More recently, an airstrip in Area 6 is in use by the Departments of Defense and Homeland security to test UAV sensors.

=== Area 7 ===
Area 7 held 92 nuclear tests.

During Operation Buster, four successful tests were conducted via airdrop, with bomber aircraft releasing nuclear weapons over Area 7.

Shot "Icecap" planned for 1993 was abandoned in Area 7 following 1992's testing moratorium. The tower, shaft and wiring remain in place, along with a crane intended to lower the nuclear test package into the shaft.

=== Area 8 ===
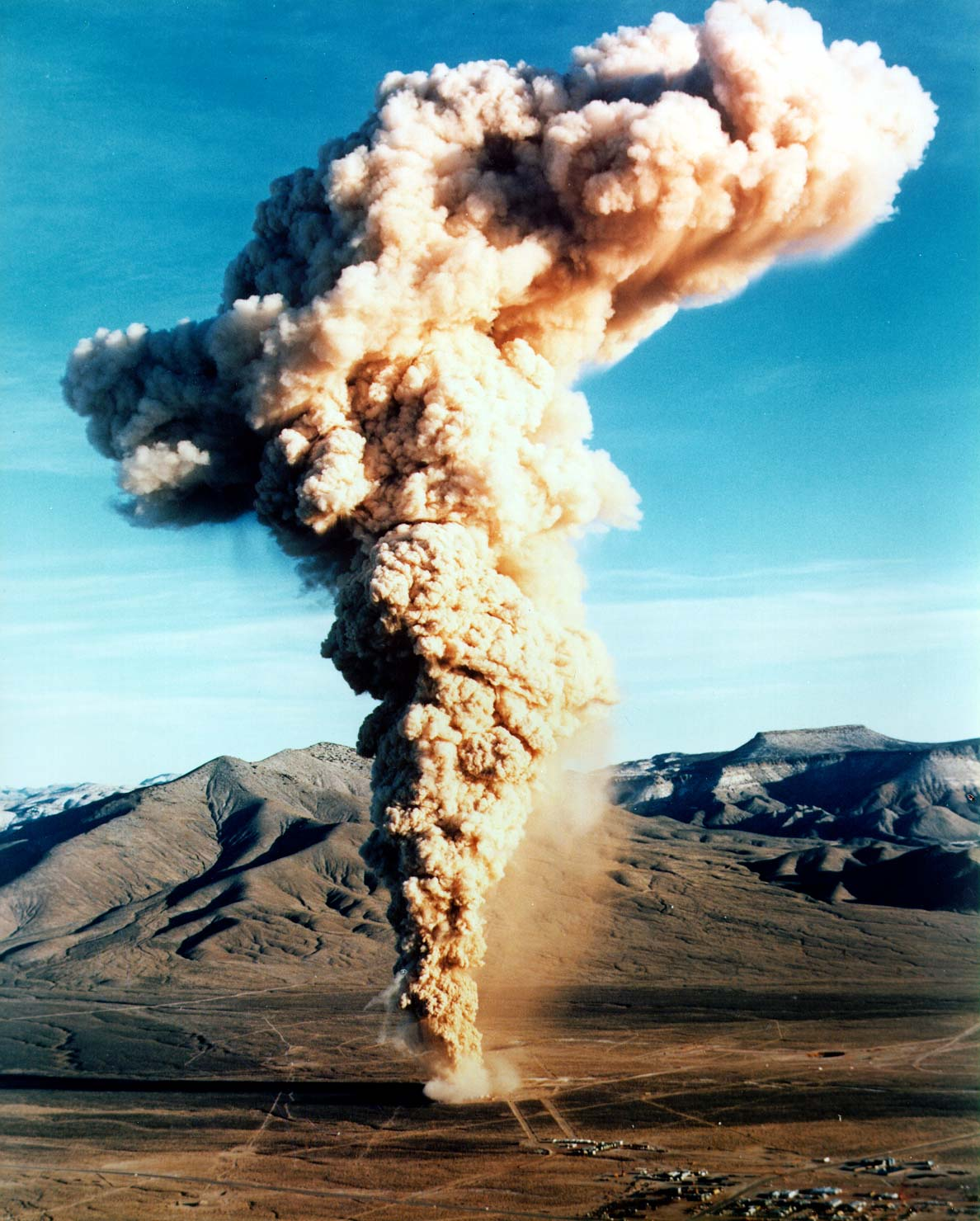
Radioactive materials were accidentally released from the 1970 Baneberry shot in Area 8.

Area 8 held 13 nuclear tests for a total of 15 detonations.

Area 8 hosted the "Baneberry" shot of Operation Emery on December 18, 1970. The Baneberry 10 kt (42 TJ) test detonated 900 feet (270 m) below the surface but its energy cracked the soil in unexpected ways, causing a fissure near ground zero and the failure of the shaft stemming and cap. A plume of fire and dust was released, raining fallout on workers in different locations within the site. The radioactive plume released 6.7 megacuries (250 PBq) of radioactive material, including 80 kCi (3.0 PBq) of Iodine^{131}.

=== Area 9 ===
Area 9 held 115 nuclear tests for a total of 133 detonations.

In Area 9, the 74 kt (310 TJ) "Hood" test on July 5, 1957, part of Operation Plumbbob, was the largest atmospheric test ever conducted within the continental United States; nearly five times larger in yield than the bomb dropped on Hiroshima. A balloon carried Hood up to 460 meters above the ground where it was detonated. Over 2,000 troops took part in the test in order to train them in conducting operations on the nuclear battlefield. 11 megacuries (410 PBq) of iodine-131 (^{131}I) were released into the air.

=== Area 10 ===
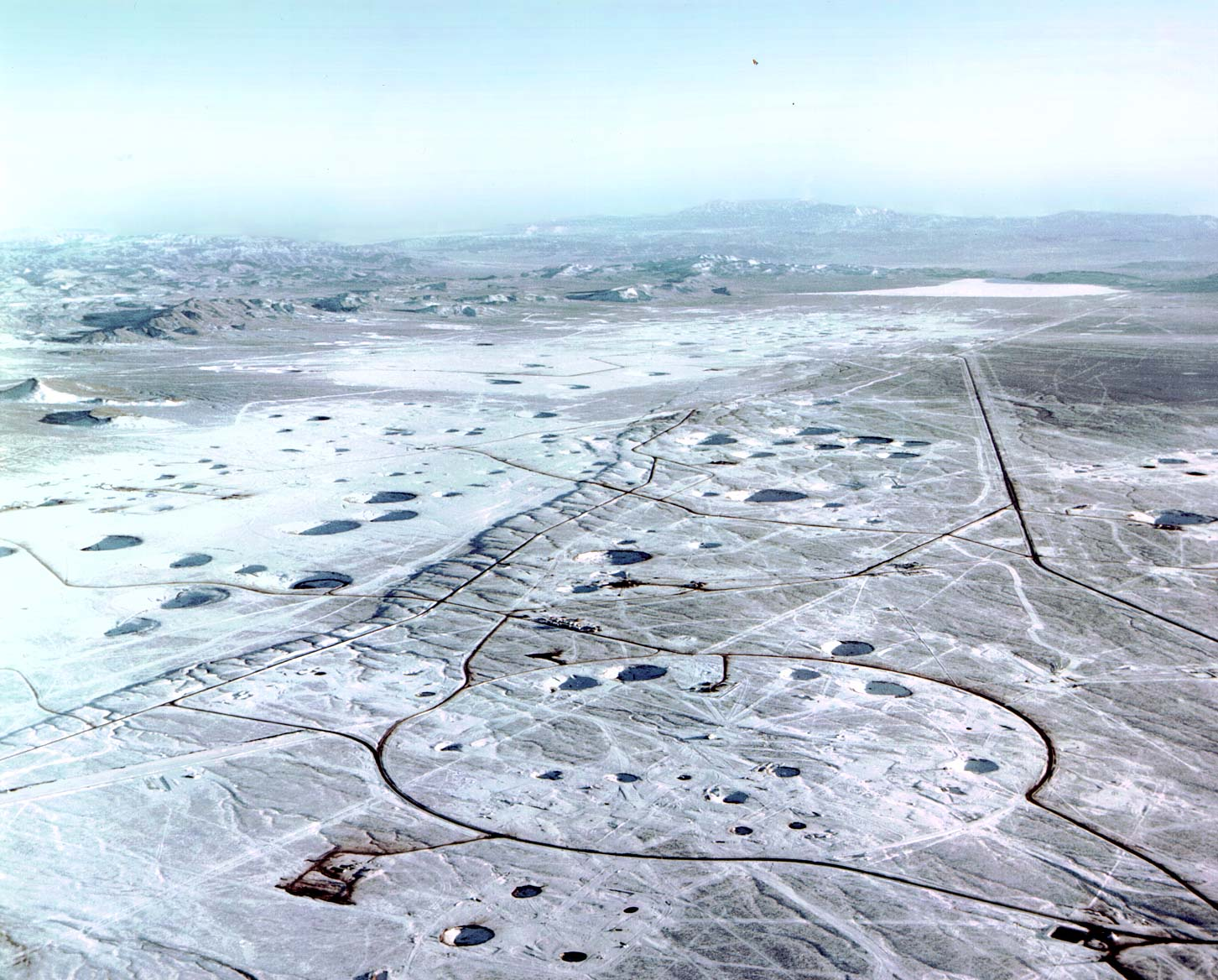
North end of Yucca Flat, where most tests have been conducted.

Area 10 held 57 nuclear tests for a total of 71 detonations.

The first underground test at the site was the "Uncle" shot of Operation Jangle. Uncle detonated on November 29, 1951, within a shaft sunk into Area 10.

The "John" shot of Plumbbob, on July 19, 1957, was the first test firing of the nuclear-tipped AIR-2 Genie air-to-air rocket designed to destroy incoming enemy bombers with a nuclear explosion. The 2 kt (8.4 TJ) warhead exploded approximately three miles above five volunteers and a photographer who stood unprotected at "ground zero" in Area 10 to show the safety of battlefield nuclear weapons to personnel on the ground. The test also demonstrated the ability of a fighter aircraft to deliver a nuclear-tipped rocket and avoid being destroyed in the process. A Northrop F-89J fired the rocket.

The "Sedan" test of Operation Storax on July 6, 1962, a 104 kt (440 TJ) shot for the Operation Plowshare which sought to discover whether nuclear weapons could be used for peaceful means in creating lakes, bays or canals. The explosion displaced 12 million tons of earth, creating the Sedan crater which is 1,280 feet (390 m) wide and 320 feet (100 m) deep.

=== Area 11 ===
Area 11 held 9 nuclear tests. Four of the tests were weapons safety experiments conducted as Project 56; they spread so much radioactive material that Area 11 has been called "Plutonium Valley". As is the case with Area 1, background radiation levels make Area 11 suitable for realistic training in methods of radiation detection.

=== Area 12 ===
Area 12 held 61 nuclear tests between 1957 and 1992, one of which involved two detonations. All tests were conducted below Rainier and Aqueduct mesas.

Area 12 was the primary location for tunnel tests and used almost exclusively for that purpose. The tunnel complexes mined into Rainier and Aqueduct Mesa include the B-, C-, D-, E-, F-, G-, I-, J-, K-, N-, P-, and T-Tunnel complexes, and the R- and S- shafts.

=== Area 13 ===
There is no Area 13 within NNSS, though such a name is attached to a section of Nellis Air Force Range which abuts the northeastern corner of Area 15. Project 57's weapons safety test was conducted here on April 24, 1957, spreading particles emitting alpha radiation over a large area.

=== Area 14 ===
Area 14 occupies approximately 26 square miles (67 km^{2}) in the central portion of the NNSS. Various outdoor experiments are conducted in this area. No atmospheric or underground nuclear tests were conducted in Area 14.

=== Area 15 ===
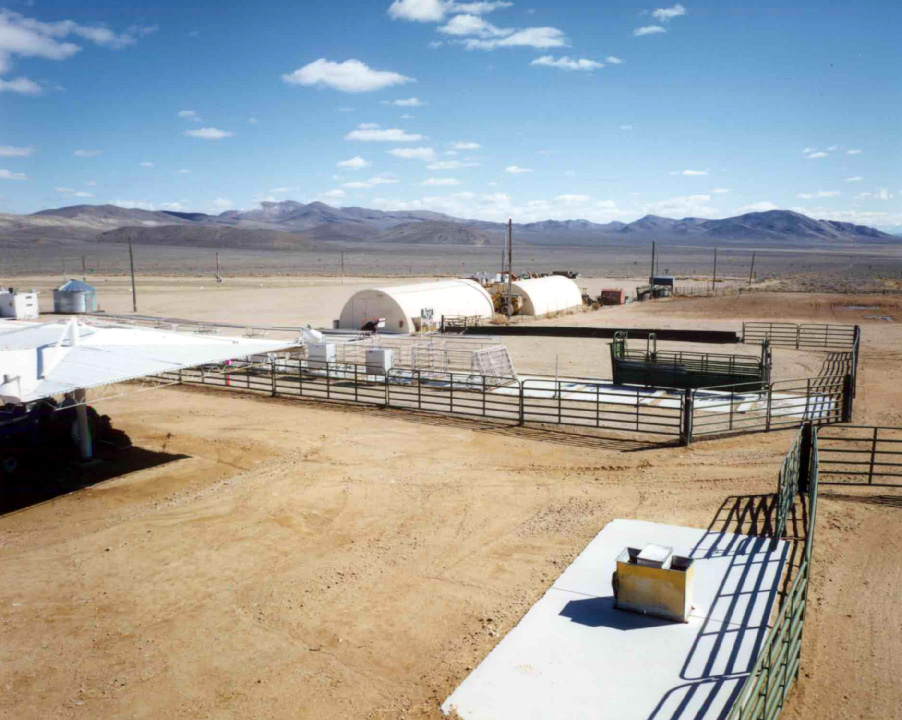
EPA farm in Area 15

Three underground detonations took place in area 15 in the 1960s.

Pile Driver was a notable Department of Defense test. A large underground installation was built to study the survivability of hardened underground bunkers undergoing a nuclear attack. Information from the test was used in designing hardened missile silos and the North American Aerospace Defense Command facility in Colorado Springs.

The abandoned Crystal and Climax mines are found in Area 15. Storage tanks hold contaminated materials.

From 1964 to 1981, the Environmental Protection Agency operated a 36-acre (150,000 m^{2}) experimental farm in Area 15. Extensive plant and soil studies evaluated the uptake of pollutants in farm-grown vegetables and from the forage eaten by a dairy herd of some 30 Holstein cows. Scientists also studied horses, pigs, goats, and chickens.

=== Area 16 ===
Area 16 held six nuclear tests.

=== Area 17 ===
No nuclear tests took place in Area 17.

=== Area 18 ===
Area 18 held five nuclear tests and includes the Pahute Mesa Airstrip.

=== Area 19 ===
Pahute Mesa is one of four major nuclear test regions within the Nevada National Security Site (NNSS). It occupies 243 square miles (630 km^{2}) in the northwest corner of the NNSS. The eastern section is known as Area 19 and the western section as Area 20.

A total of 85 nuclear tests were conducted in Pahute Mesa between 1965 and 1992. Three of them – Boxcar, Benham and Handley – had a yield of over one megaton. Three tests were conducted as part of Operation Plowshare and one as part of Vela Uniform.

=== Area 20 ===
The western section of Pahute Mesa, with a portion of the 85 nuclear tests conducted in the Pahute Mesa occurring in this section.

=== Area 21 ===
There is no Area 21 within NNSS, though such a name is attached to a section of Los Alamos National Laboratory.

=== Area 22 ===
No nuclear tests took place in Area 22. Area 22 once held Camp Desert Rock, a staging base for troops undergoing atmospheric nuclear blast training; as many as 9,000 troops camped there in 1955. Desert Rock Airport's runway was enlarged to a 7,500 ft (2,300 m) length in 1969 by the Atomic Energy Commission. It is a transport hub for personnel and supplies going to NNSS and also serves as an emergency landing strip.

=== Area 23 ===
No nuclear tests took place in Area 23. The town of Mercury, Nevada lies within Area 23. The area is the main pathway to and from NNSS test locations by way of U.S. Route 95. An open sanitary landfill is located to the west of Mercury, and a closed hazardous waste site abuts the landfill. Mercury is also the main management area for the site which includes a bar and large cafeteria, printing plant, medical center, warehousing, fleet management, liquidation and recycling center, engineering offices, dormitories, and other administrative areas for both the O&M contractors, LLNL, LANL, and SNL personnel. At its height in the 1950s and '60s, it also held several restaurants, a bowling alley, a movie theater, and a motel.

=== Area 24 ===
There is no Area 24 within NNSS, though such a name is attached to a satellite site of the NNSS referred to as the North Las Vegas Facility.

=== Area 26 ===
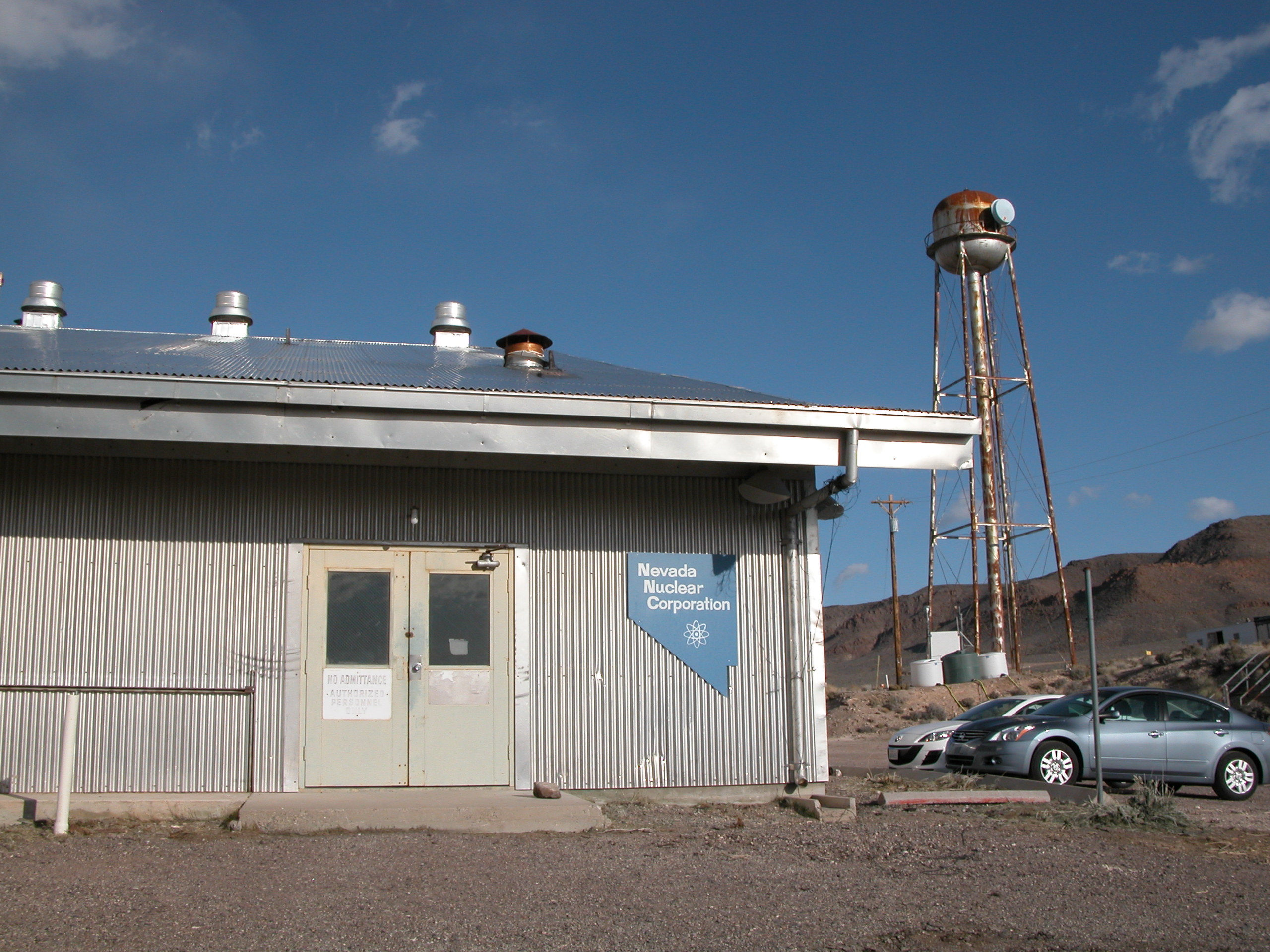
Mostly abandoned buildings and structures at Port Gaston

No nuclear tests took place in Area 26, the most arid section of the NNSS. An old abandoned mine, the Horn Silver Mine, was used for waste disposal between 1959 and the 1970s; some of the waste is radioactive. Water flow past the shaft could pose a human health risk, so corrective action has been planned.

In 1983 the Department of Defense, the Department of Energy, and the Federal Emergency Management Agency performed the NUWAX-83 tests near Port Gaston in Area 26, simulating the explosion of a nuclear-armed helicopter and the resulting spread of nuclear debris over 65 acres. The radioactive material used to simulate the accident became inert in less than six months.

An eight-square-mile complex was constructed in Area 26 in support of Project Pluto. It consisted of six miles of roads, the critical assembly building, the control building, the assembly and shop buildings, and utilities. Those buildings have been used recently as mock reactor facilities in the training of first responders.

=== Area 28 ===
Area 28 no longer exists; it was absorbed into Areas 25 and 27.

=== Area 29 ===
No nuclear tests took place in Area 29. The rugged terrain of Area 29 serves as a buffer between other areas of NNSS. A helipad is present at Shoshone Peak.

=== Area 30 ===
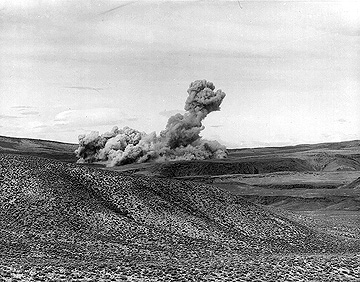
The Crosstie Buggy test

Area 30 occupies approximately 59 square miles (150 km^{2}) at the center of the western edge of the NNSS. Area 30 has rugged terrain and includes the northern reaches of Fortymile Canyon. It is used primarily for military training and exercises.

Area 30 was the site of a single nuclear test, the Crosstie Buggy row charge experiment, part of Operation Plowshare, which involved five simultaneous detonations.

== See also ==
- Lists of nuclear disasters and radioactive incidents
- Savannah River Site, DOE reservation with similar operations as NTS
- Semipalatinsk Test Site
- Novaya Zemlya Test Site
- Area 51/Area 52
- Totskoye nuclear exercise
- International Day against Nuclear Tests
