= Operation Musketeer (nuclear test) =

Series of 1980s US nuclear tests

Musketeer

Information
- Country: United States
- Test site: NTS Area 12, Rainier Mesa; NTS Area 19, 20, Pahute Mesa; NTS, Areas 1–4, 6–10, Yucca Flat
- Period: 1986–1987
- Number of tests: 14
- Test type: underground shaft, tunnel
- Max. yield: 150 kilotonnes of TNT (630 TJ)

Test series chronology

The United States's Musketeer nuclear test series was a group of 14 nuclear tests conducted in 1986–1987. These tests (Note: A bomb test may be a salvo test, defined as two or more explosions "where a period of time between successive individual explosions does not exceed 5 seconds and where the burial points of all explosive devices can be connected by segments of straight lines, each of them connecting two burial points and does not exceed 40 kilometers in length". Mikhailov, V. N. "Catalog of World Wide Nuclear Testing". Begell-Atom. Archived from the original on April 26, 2014.) followed the Operation Charioteer series and preceded the Operation Touchstone series.

United States' Musketeer series tests and detonations
Name (Note: The US, France and Great Britain have code-named their test events, while the USSR and China did not, and therefore have only test numbers (with some exceptions – Soviet peaceful explosions were named). Word translations into English in parentheses unless the name is a proper noun. A dash followed by a number indicates a member of a salvo event. The US also sometimes named the individual explosions in such a salvo test, which results in "name1 – 1(with name2)". If test is canceled or aborted, then the row data like date and location discloses the intended plans, where known.)	Date time (UT)	Local time zone (Note: To convert the UT time into standard local, add the number of hours in parentheses to the UT time; for local daylight saving time, add one additional hour. If the result is earlier than 00:00, add 24 hours and subtract 1 from the day; if it is 24:00 or later, subtract 24 hours and add 1 to the day. Historical time zone data obtained from the IANA time zone database.)	Location (Note: Rough place name and a latitude/longitude reference; for rocket-carried tests, the launch location is specified before the detonation location, if known. Some locations are extremely accurate; others (like airdrops and space blasts) may be quite inaccurate. "~" indicates a likely pro-forma rough location, shared with other tests in that same area.)	Elevation + height (Note: Elevation is the ground level at the point directly below the explosion relative to sea level; height is the additional distance added or subtracted by tower, balloon, shaft, tunnel, air drop or other contrivance. For rocket bursts the ground level is "N/A". In some cases it is not clear if the height is absolute or relative to ground, for example, Plumbbob/John. No number or units indicates the value is unknown, while "0" means zero. Sorting on this column is by elevation and height added together.)	Delivery (Note: Atmospheric, airdrop, balloon, gun, cruise missile, rocket, surface, tower, and barge are all disallowed by the Partial Nuclear Test Ban Treaty. Sealed shaft and tunnel are underground, and remained useful under the PTBT. Intentional cratering tests are borderline; they occurred under the treaty, were sometimes protested, and generally overlooked if the test was declared to be a peaceful use.) Purpose (Note: Include weapons development, weapon effects, safety test, transport safety test, war, science, joint verification and industrial/peaceful, which may be further broken down.)	Device (Note: Designations for test items where known, "?" indicates some uncertainty about the preceding value, nicknames for particular devices in quotes. This category of information is often not officially disclosed.)	Yield (Note: Estimated energy yield in tons, kilotons, and megatons. A ton of TNT equivalent is defined as 4.184 gigajoules (1 gigacalorie).)	Fallout (Note: Radioactive emission to the atmosphere aside from prompt neutrons, where known. The measured species is only iodine-131 if mentioned, otherwise it is all species. No entry means unknown, probably none if underground and "all" if not; otherwise notation for whether measured on the site only or off the site, where known, and the measured amount of radioactivity released.)	References	Notes
Belmont	October 16, 1986 19:25:00.089	PST (–8 hrs)	NTS Area U20as 37.22016°N 116.46252°W	1,871 m (6,138 ft) – 605.03 m (1,985.0 ft)	underground shaft, weapons development		140 kt	Venting detected, 0.2 Ci (7.4 GBq)		Collapsed partial crater off to the southwest.
Gascon	November 14, 1986 16:00:00.066	PST (–8 hrs)	NTS Area U4t 37.10054°N 116.04911°W	1,236 m (4,055 ft) – 593.14 m (1,946.0 ft)	underground shaft, weapons development		120 kt	I-131 venting detected, 0		
Bodie	December 13, 1986 17:50:05.093	PST (–8 hrs)	NTS Area U20ap 37.2629°N 116.41257°W	1,991 m (6,532 ft) – 635 m (2,083 ft)	underground shaft, weapons development		140 kt	Venting detected, 1 Ci (37 GBq)		
Hazebrook-Apricot (Orange) - 3	February 3, 1987 15:20:00.08	PST (–8 hrs)	NTS Area U10bh 37.18109°N 116.04931°W	1,291 m (4,236 ft) – 262 m (860 ft)	underground shaft, safety experiment		less than 20 kt	I-131 venting detected, 0		Simultaneous, same hole.
Hazebrook-Checkerberry (Red) - 2	February 3, 1987 15:20:00.08	PST (–8 hrs)	NTS Area U10bh 37.18109°N 116.04931°W	1,291 m (4,236 ft) – 226 m (741 ft)	underground shaft, weapons development		less than 20 kt	I-131 venting detected, 0		Simultaneous, same hole.
Hazebrook-Emerald (Green) - 1	February 3, 1987 15:20:00.083	PST (–8 hrs)	NTS Area U10bh 37.18109°N 116.04931°W	1,291 m (4,236 ft) – 186 m (610 ft)	underground shaft, weapons development		less than 20 kt	I-131 venting detected, 0		Simultaneous, same hole.
Tornero	February 11, 1987 16:45:00.07	PST (–8 hrs)	NTS Area U3ll 37.01067°N 116.04543°W	1,186 m (3,891 ft) – 298.4 m (979 ft)	underground shaft, weapons development		6 kt			
Middle Note	March 18, 1987 18:28:00.085	PST (–8 hrs)	NTS Area U12n.21 37.21019°N 116.20944°W	2,223 m (7,293 ft) – 398.7 m (1,308 ft)	tunnel, weapon effect		3.5 kt			
Delamar	April 18, 1987 13:40:00.0	PST (–8 hrs)	NTS Area U20at 37.24798°N 116.51013°W	1,875 m (6,152 ft) – 544.1 m (1,785 ft)	underground shaft, weapons development		100 kt			
Presidio	April 22, 1987 23:00:00.088	PST (–8 hrs)	NTS Area U6d 36.98311°N 116.00531°W	1,171 m (3,842 ft) – 319.7 m (1,049 ft)	underground shaft, weapons development		2.5 kt			
Hardin	April 30, 1987 13:30:00.089	PST (–8 hrs)	NTS Area U20av 37.23299°N 116.42401°W	1,943 m (6,375 ft) – 625 m (2,051 ft)	underground shaft, weapons development		100 kt	Venting detected, 0.2 Ci (7.4 GBq)		
Brie	June 18, 1987 15:20:00.082	PST (–8 hrs)	NTS Area U10cc 37.19351°N 116.03588°W	1,318 m (4,324 ft) – 203 m (666 ft)	underground shaft, weapons development		less than 20 kt			
Mission Ghost	June 20, 1987 16:00:00.18	PST (–8 hrs)	NTS Area U12t.09 37.22°N 116.17838°W	2,017 m (6,617 ft) – 321.3 m (1,054 ft)	tunnel, weapon effect		less than 20 kt	Venting detected, 3 Ci (110 GBq)		
Panchuela	June 30, 1987 16:05:00.1	PST (–8 hrs)	NTS Area U3mg 36.99855°N 116.04394°W	1,179 m (3,868 ft) – 319.13 m (1,047.0 ft)	underground shaft, weapons development		8 kt	Venting detected, less than 100 Ci (3,700 GBq)		
Tahoka	August 13, 1987 14:00:00.09	PST (–8 hrs)	NTS Area U3mf 37.06091°N 116.04618°W	1,212 m (3,976 ft) – 638.56 m (2,095.0 ft)	underground shaft, weapons development		150 kt			
Lockney	September 24, 1987 15:00:00.055	PST (–8 hrs)	NTS Area U19aq 37.22794°N 116.37559°W	2,045 m (6,709 ft) – 614.17 m (2,015.0 ft)	underground shaft, weapons development		150 kt	Venting detected, 4 Ci (150 GBq)		
