= Operation Cornerstone =

Series of 1980s US nuclear tests

Cornerstone

Information
- Country: United States
- Test site: NTS Area 12, Rainier Mesa; NTS Area 19, 20, Pahute Mesa; NTS, Areas 1–4, 6–10, Yucca Flat
- Period: 1988–1989
- Number of tests: 11
- Test type: underground shaft, tunnel
- Max. yield: 150 kilotonnes of TNT (630 TJ)

Test series chronology

The United States's Cornerstone nuclear test series was a group of 11 nuclear tests conducted in 1988–1989. These tests (Note: A bomb test may be a salvo test, defined as two or more explosions "where a period of time between successive individual explosions does not exceed 5 seconds and where the burial points of all explosive devices can be connected by segments of straight lines, each of them connecting two burial points and does not exceed 40 kilometers in length".Mikhailov, V. N. "Catalog of World Wide Nuclear Testing". Begell-Atom. Archived from the original on April 26, 2014.) followed the Operation Touchstone series and preceded the Operation Aqueduct series.

United States' Cornerstone series tests and detonations
Name (Note: The US, France and Great Britain have code-named their test events, while the USSR and China did not, and therefore have only test numbers (with some exceptions – Soviet peaceful explosions were named). Word translations into English in parentheses unless the name is a proper noun. A dash followed by a number indicates a member of a salvo event. The US also sometimes named the individual explosions in such a salvo test, which results in "name1 – 1(with name2)". If test is canceled or aborted, then the row data like date and location discloses the intended plans, where known.)	Date time (UT)	Local time zone (Note: To convert the UT time into standard local, add the number of hours in parentheses to the UT time; for local daylight saving time, add one additional hour. If the result is earlier than 00:00, add 24 hours and subtract 1 from the day; if it is 24:00 or later, subtract 24 hours and add 1 to the day. Historical time zone data obtained from the IANA time zone database.)	Location (Note: Rough place name and a latitude/longitude reference; for rocket-carried tests, the launch location is specified before the detonation location, if known. Some locations are extremely accurate; others (like airdrops and space blasts) may be quite inaccurate. "~" indicates a likely pro-forma rough location, shared with other tests in that same area.)	Elevation + height (Note: Elevation is the ground level at the point directly below the explosion relative to sea level; height is the additional distance added or subtracted by tower, balloon, shaft, tunnel, air drop or other contrivance. For rocket bursts the ground level is "N/A". In some cases it is not clear if the height is absolute or relative to ground, for example, Plumbbob/John. No number or units indicates the value is unknown, while "0" means zero. Sorting on this column is by elevation and height added together.)	Delivery (Note: Atmospheric, airdrop, balloon, gun, cruise missile, rocket, surface, tower, and barge are all disallowed by the Partial Nuclear Test Ban Treaty. Sealed shaft and tunnel are underground, and remained useful under the PTBT. Intentional cratering tests are borderline; they occurred under the treaty, were sometimes protested, and generally overlooked if the test was declared to be a peaceful use.) Purpose (Note: Include weapons development, weapon effects, safety test, transport safety test, war, science, joint verification and industrial/peaceful, which may be further broken down.)	Device (Note: Designations for test items where known, "?" indicates some uncertainty about the preceding value, nicknames for particular devices in quotes. This category of information is often not officially disclosed.)	Yield (Note: Estimated energy yield in tons, kilotons, and megatons. A ton of TNT equivalent is defined as 4.184 gigajoules (1 gigacalorie).)	Fallout (Note: Radioactive emission to the atmosphere aside from prompt neutrons, where known. The measured species is only iodine-131 if mentioned, otherwise it is all species. No entry means unknown, probably none if underground and "all" if not; otherwise notation for whether measured on the site only or off the site, where known, and the measured amount of radioactivity released.)	References	Notes
Dalhart	October 13, 1988 14:00:00.08	PST (–8 hrs)	NTS Area U4u 37.08895°N 116.05013°W	1,229 m (4,032 ft) – 639.78 m (2,099.0 ft)	underground shaft, weapons development		150 kt			
Monahans - 1	November 9, 1988 20:15:00.08	PST (–8 hrs)	NTS Area U3lk 36.99116°N 116.02198°W	1,175 m (3,855 ft) – 289.86 m (951.0 ft)	underground shaft, weapons development		less than 20 kt			Simultaneous, separate holes.
Monahans - 2	November 9, 1988 20:15:00.08	PST (–8 hrs)	NTS Area U6i 36.98868°N 116.02197°W	1,174 m (3,852 ft) +	underground shaft, weapons development		less than 20 kt			Simultaneous, separate holes.
Kawich Blue - 4	December 9, 1988 15:15:00.08	PST (–8 hrs)	NTS Area U8n 37.17527°N 116.09261°W	1,357 m (4,452 ft) +	underground shaft, safety experiment		less than 20 kt			Simultaneous, same hole with white.
Kawich White - 3	December 9, 1988 15:15:00.08	PST (–8 hrs)	NTS Area U8n 37.17527°N 116.09261°W	1,357 m (4,452 ft) – 384 m (1,260 ft)	underground shaft, safety experiment		3 kt			Simultaneous, same hole with blue.
Misty Echo	December 10, 1988 20:30:00.06	PST (–8 hrs)	NTS Area U12n.23 37.19899°N 116.21032°W	2,232 m (7,323 ft) – 400 m (1,300 ft)	tunnel, weapon effect		25 kt	Venting detected, 7 Ci (260 GBq)		
Texarkana	February 10, 1989 20:06:00.055	PST (–8 hrs)	NTS Area U7ca 37.07678°N 116.00137°W	1,267 m (4,157 ft) – 504.02 m (1,653.6 ft)	underground shaft, weapons development		67 kt			
Kawich Black - 1	February 24, 1989 16:15:00.08	PST (–8 hrs)	NTS Area U2cu 37.1285°N 116.12267°W	1,352 m (4,436 ft) – 431 m (1,414 ft)	underground shaft, safety experiment		less than 20 kt	Venting detected		Simultaneous, same hole with red.
Kawich Red - 2	February 24, 1989 16:15:00.081	PST (–8 hrs)	NTS Area U2cu 37.1285°N 116.12267°W	1,352 m (4,436 ft) – 370 m (1,210 ft)	underground shaft, weapons development		5 kt	Venting detected, 10 Ci (370 GBq)		Simultaneous, same hole with black.
Ingot	March 9, 1989 14:05:00.086	PST (–8 hrs)	NTS Area U2gg 37.14279°N 116.06781°W	1,280 m (4,200 ft) – 500 m (1,600 ft)	underground shaft, weapons development		33 kt			
Palisade - 1	May 15, 1989 13:10:00.087	PST (–8 hrs)	NTS Area U4at 37.10756°N 116.12176°W	1,338 m (4,390 ft) – 345.22 m (1,132.6 ft)	underground shaft, weapons development		5 kt	Venting detected, 2 Ci (74 GBq)		Simultaneous, same hole.
Palisade - 2	May 15, 1989 13:10:00.09	PST (–8 hrs)	NTS Area U4at 37.10756°N 116.12176°W	1,338 m (4,390 ft) – 392 m (1,286 ft)	underground shaft, safety experiment		less than 20 kt	Venting detected		Simultaneous, same hole.
Palisade - 3	May 15, 1989 13:10:00.09	PST (–8 hrs)	NTS Area U4at 37.10756°N 116.12176°W	1,338 m (4,390 ft) – 404 m (1,325 ft)	underground shaft, safety experiment		8 kt	Venting detected		Simultaneous, same hole.
Tulia	May 26, 1989 18:07:00.021	PST (–8 hrs)	NTS Area U4s 37.08587°N 116.05665°W	1,230 m (4,040 ft) – 397.8 m (1,305 ft)	underground shaft, weapons development		500 t			
Contact	June 22, 1989 21:15:00.83	PST (–8 hrs)	NTS Area U20aw 37.28282°N 116.41319°W	1,980 m (6,500 ft) – 544.1 m (1,785 ft)	underground shaft, weapons development		60 kt			
Amarillo	June 27, 1989 15:30:00.02	PST (–8 hrs)	NTS Area U19ay 37.27541°N 116.35444°W	2,019 m (6,624 ft) – 640.1 m (2,100 ft)	underground shaft, weapons development		20 kt			
Disko Elm	September 14, 1989 15:00:00.098	PST (–8 hrs)	NTS Area U12p.03 37.23589°N 116.16374°W	1,917 m (6,289 ft) – 260 m (850 ft)	tunnel, weapon effect		10 kt	Venting detected, 0.5 Ci (19 GBq)		

== Gallery ==
Operation Cornerstone
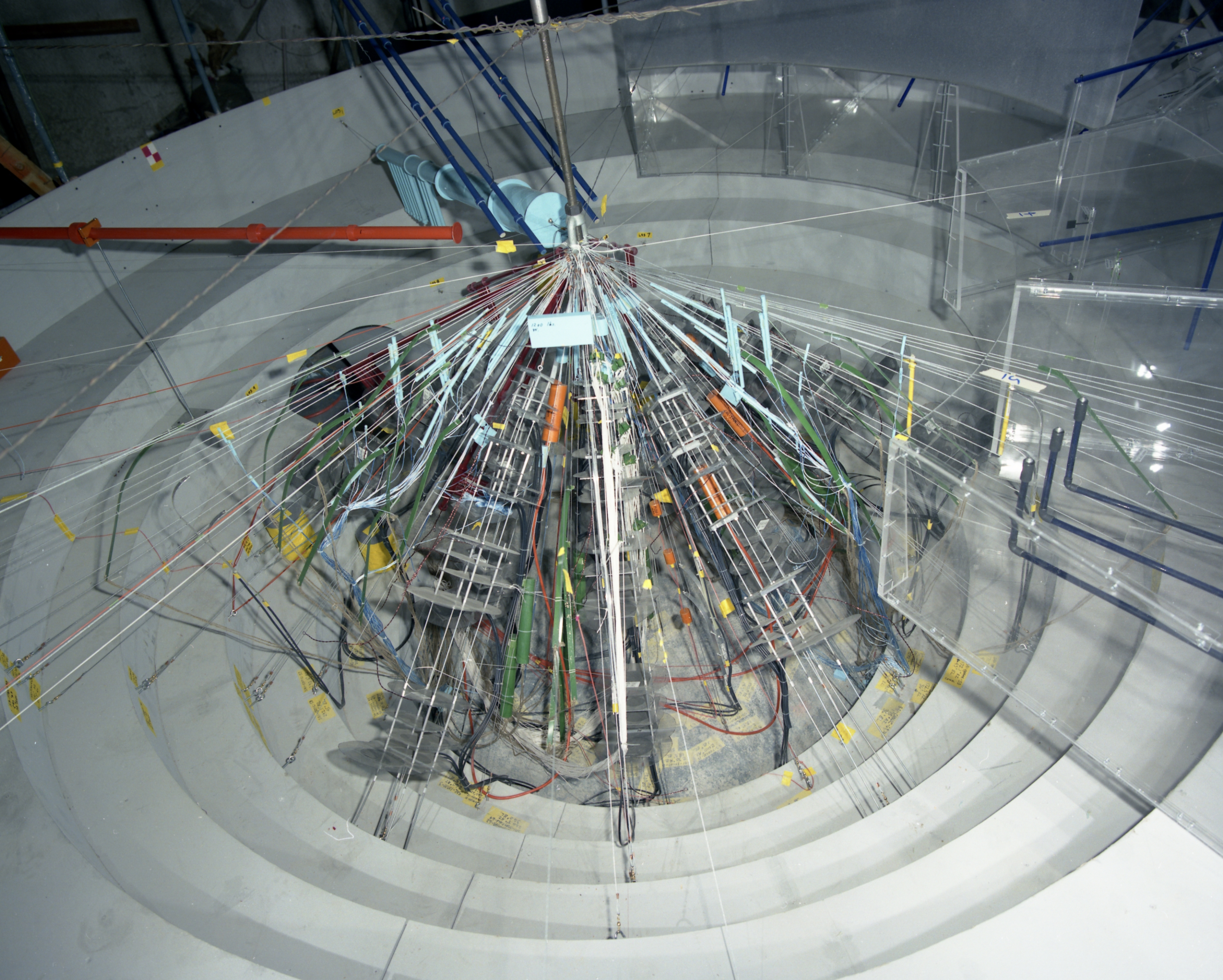
Scale mockup of Shot Misty Echo.

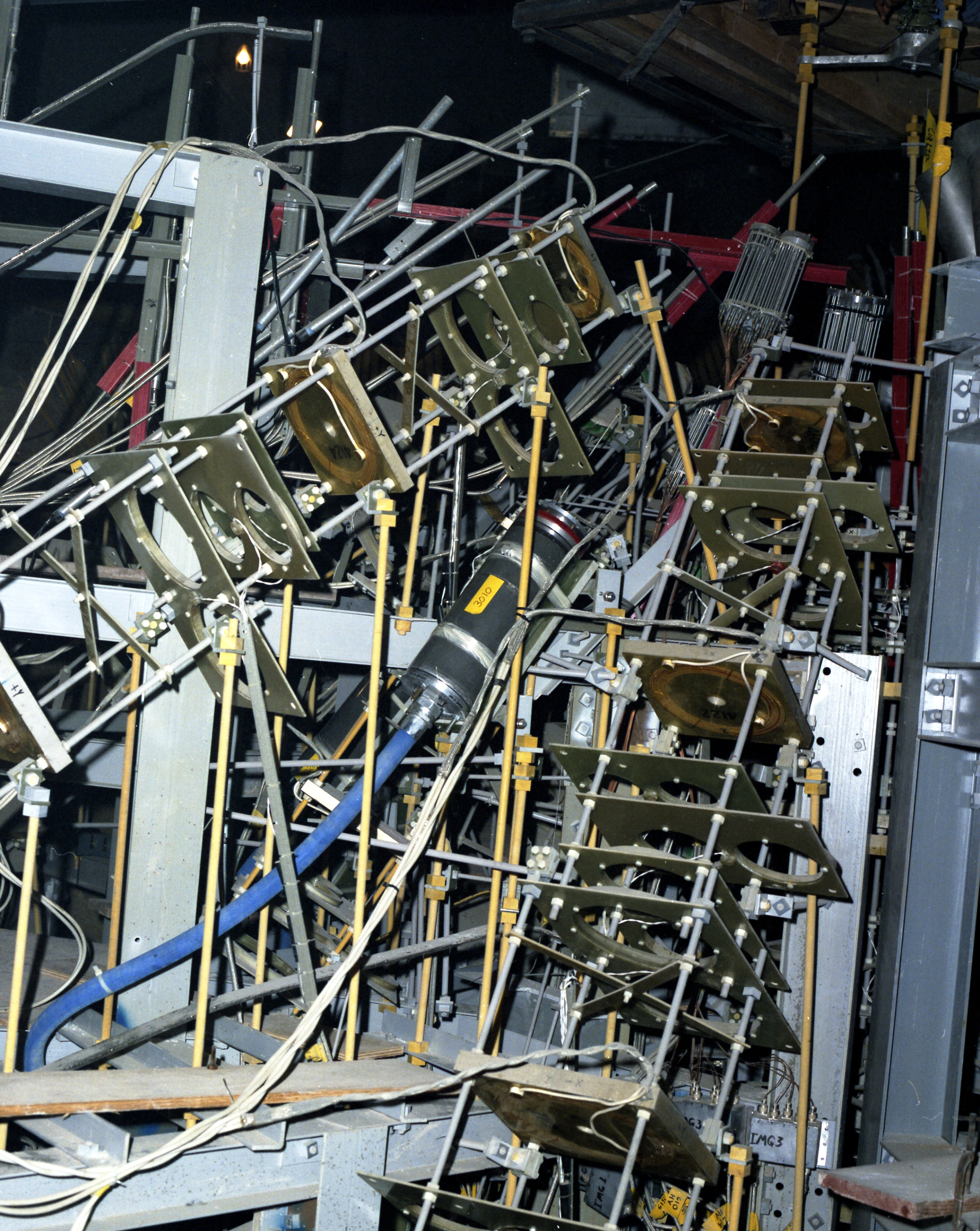
Instrumentation for shot Misty Echo.

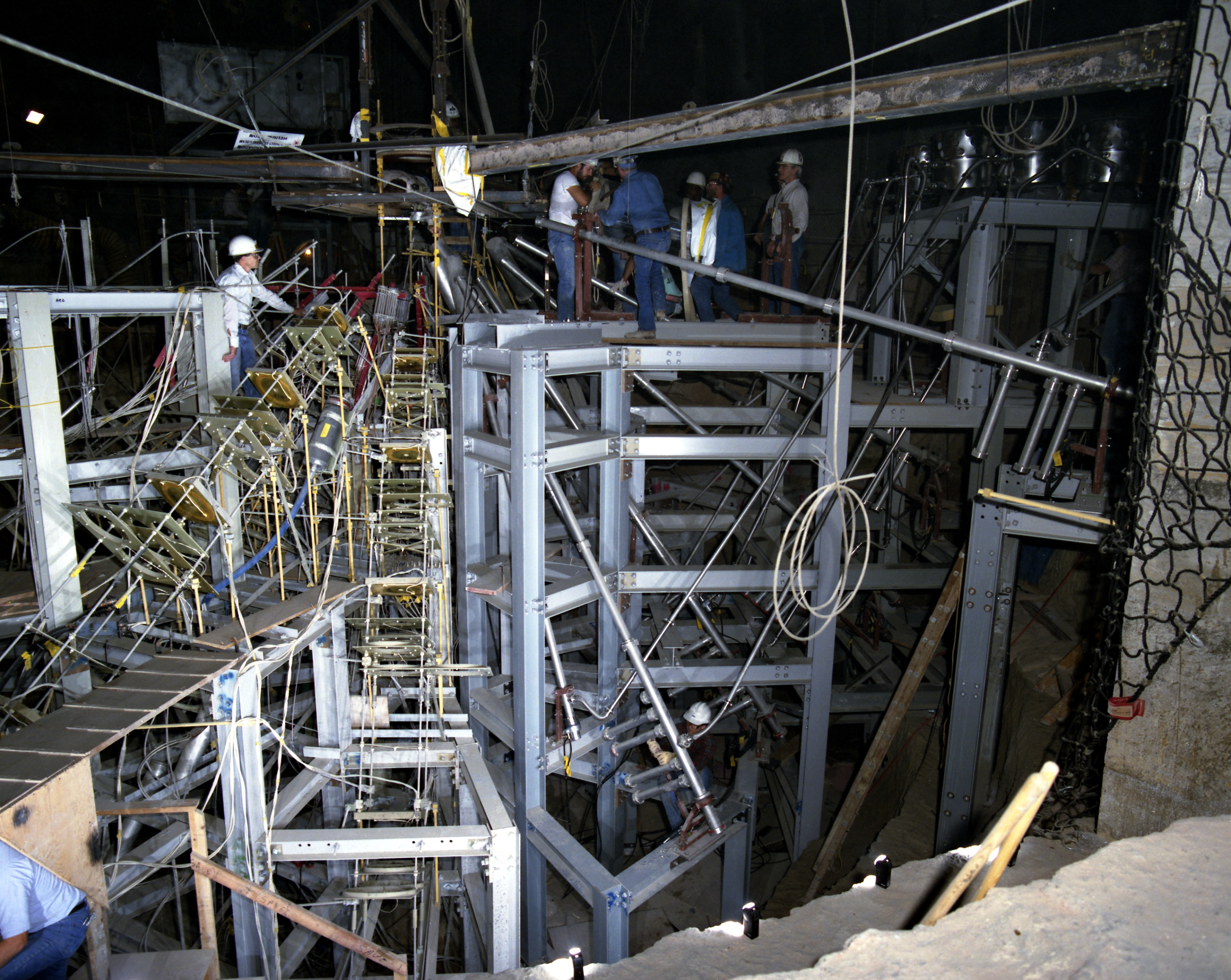
Instrumentation for shot Misty Echo

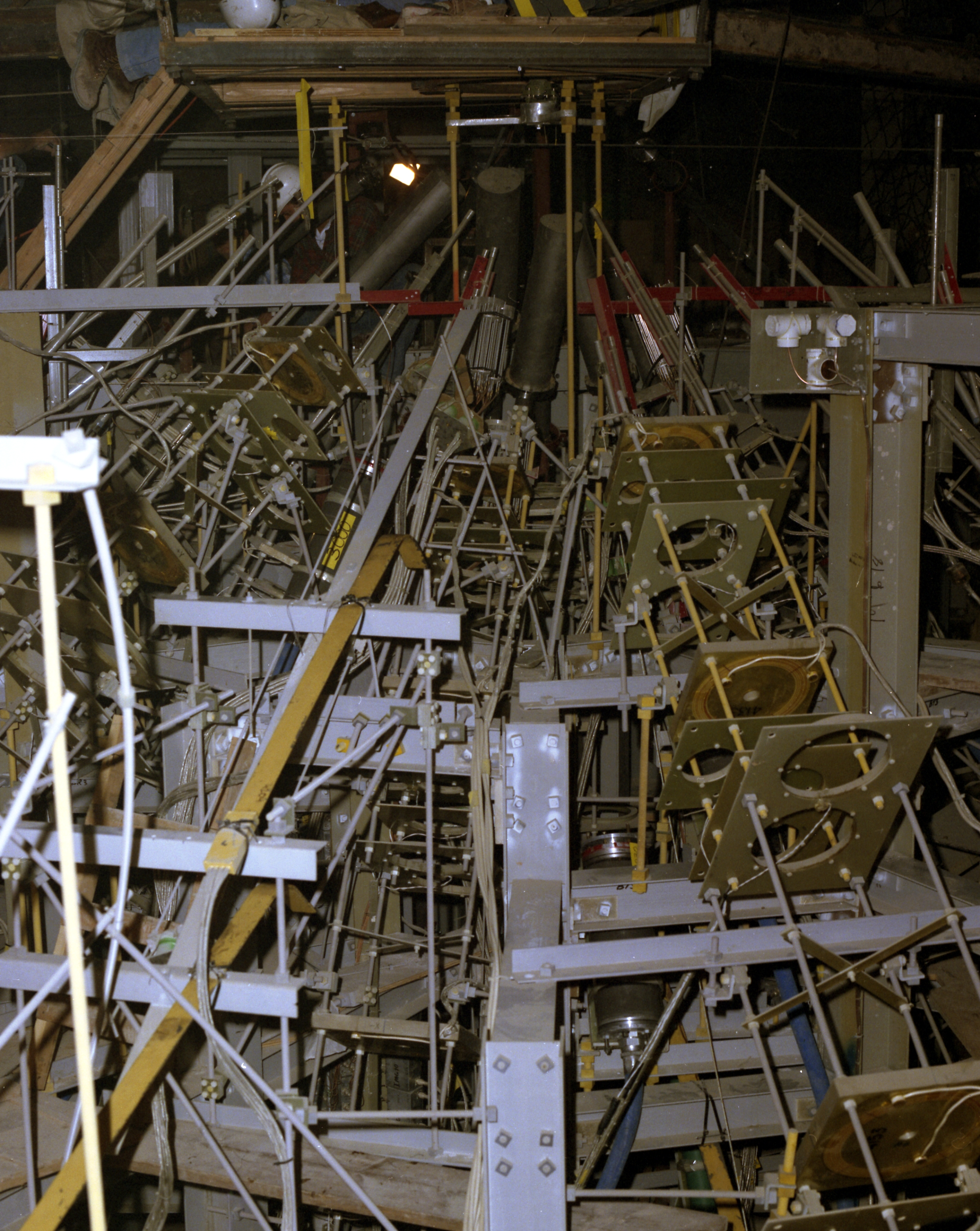
Instrumentation for shot Misty Echo.

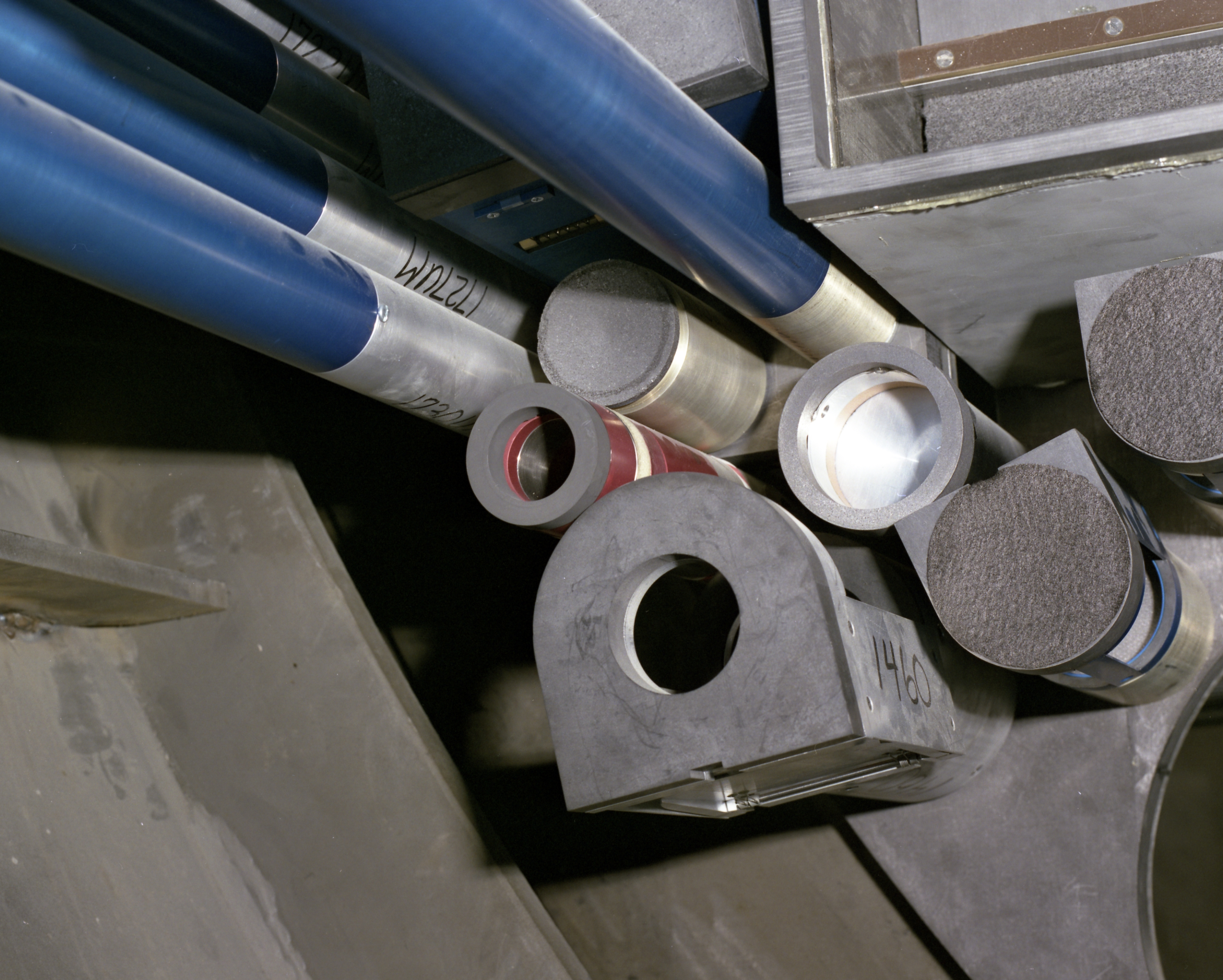
Experiments for shot Disko Elm.

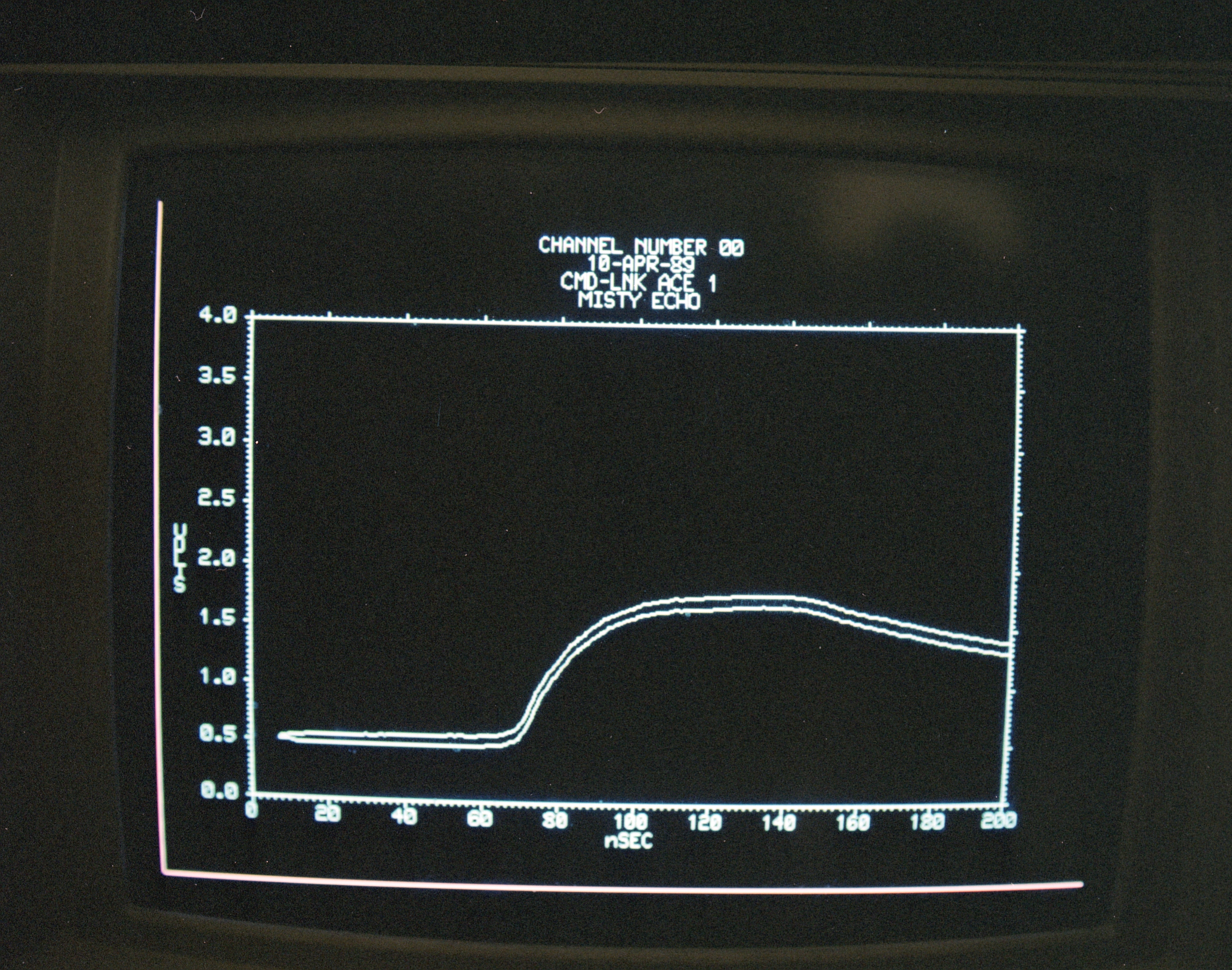
Data produced by an unknown instrument during shot Misty Echo.

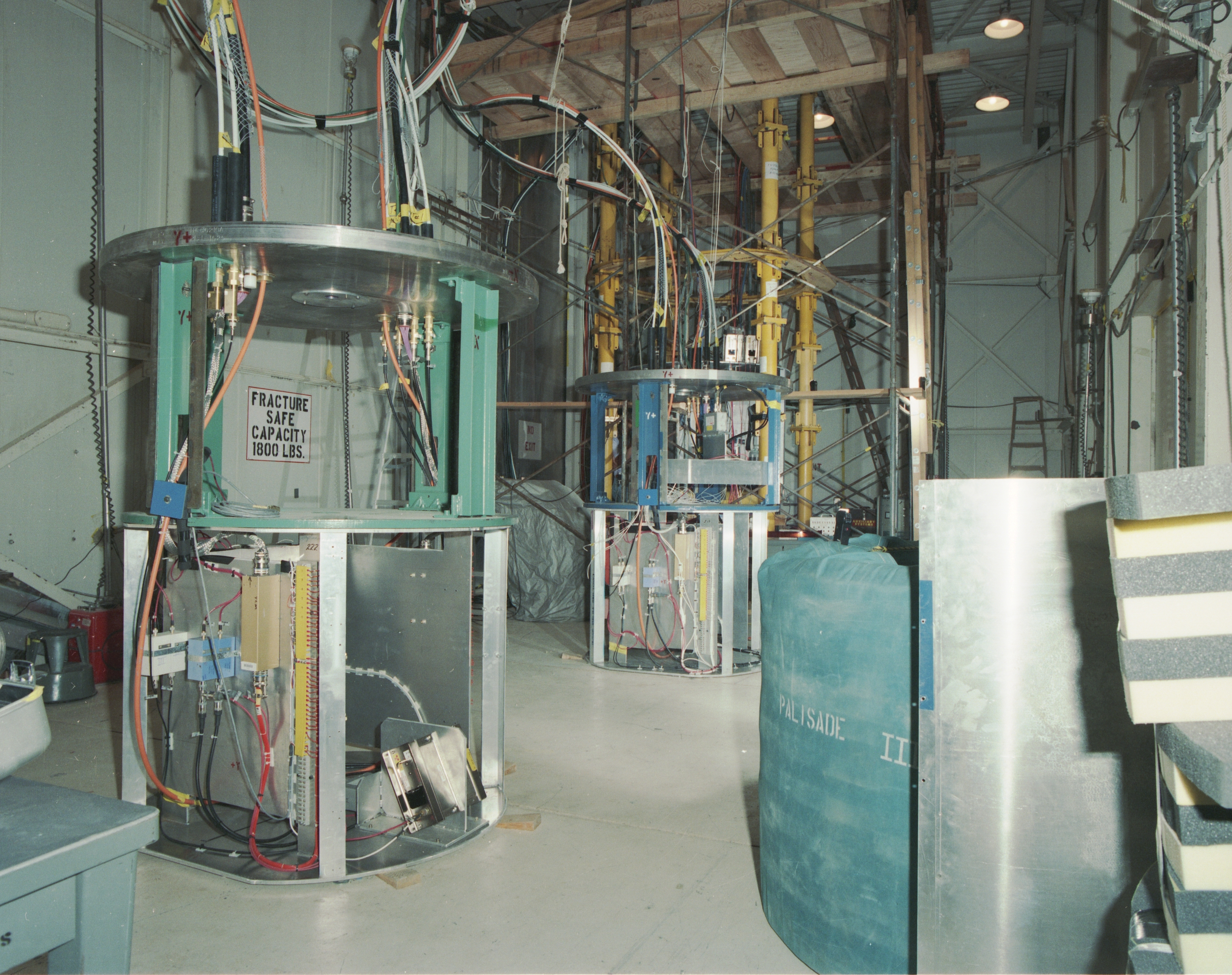
Arming and Firing (A&F) racks for shot Palisade.
