= Operation Charioteer =

Series of 1980s US nuclear tests

Charioteer
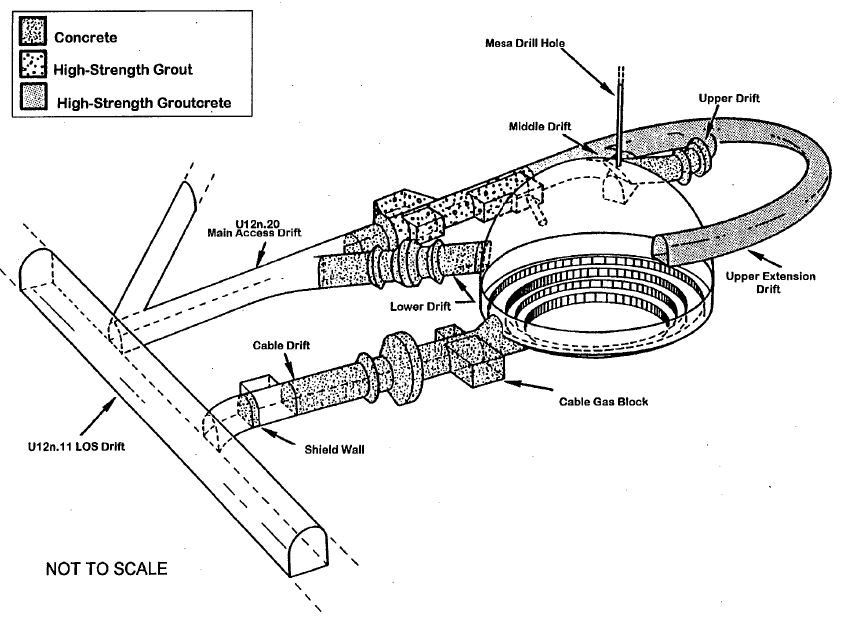
- Mill Yard test underground cavity schematic

Information
- Country: United States
- Test site: NTS Area 12, Rainier Mesa; NTS Area 19, 20, Pahute Mesa; NTS, Areas 1–4, 6–10, Yucca Flat
- Period: 1985–1986
- Number of tests: 16
- Test type: underground cavity in tunnel, underground shaft, tunnel
- Max. yield: 140 kilotonnes of TNT (590 TJ)

Test series chronology

Operation Charioteer was a series of 16 nuclear tests conducted by the United States in 1985–1986 at the Nevada Test Site. These tests followed the Operation Grenadier series and preceded the Operation Musketeer series.

United States' Charioteer series tests and detonations
Name (Note: The US, France and Great Britain have code-named their test events, while the USSR and China did not, and therefore have only test numbers (with some exceptions – Soviet peaceful explosions were named). Word translations into English in parentheses unless the name is a proper noun. A dash followed by a number indicates a member of a salvo event. The US also sometimes named the individual explosions in such a salvo test, which results in "name1 – 1(with name2)". If test is canceled or aborted, then the row data like date and location discloses the intended plans, where known.)	Date time (UT)	Local time zone (Note: To convert the UT time into standard local, add the number of hours in parentheses to the UT time; for local daylight saving time, add one additional hour. If the result is earlier than 00:00, add 24 hours and subtract 1 from the day; if it is 24:00 or later, subtract 24 hours and add 1 to the day. Historical time zone data obtained from the IANA time zone database.)	Location (Note: Rough place name and a latitude/longitude reference; for rocket-carried tests, the launch location is specified before the detonation location, if known. Some locations are extremely accurate; others (like airdrops and space blasts) may be quite inaccurate. "~" indicates a likely pro-forma rough location, shared with other tests in that same area.)	Elevation + height (Note: Elevation is the ground level at the point directly below the explosion relative to sea level; height is the additional distance added or subtracted by tower, balloon, shaft, tunnel, air drop or other contrivance. For rocket bursts the ground level is "N/A". In some cases it is not clear if the height is absolute or relative to ground, for example, Plumbbob/John. No number or units indicates the value is unknown, while "0" means zero. Sorting on this column is by elevation and height added together.)	Delivery (Note: Atmospheric, airdrop, balloon, gun, cruise missile, rocket, surface, tower, and barge are all disallowed by the Partial Nuclear Test Ban Treaty. Sealed shaft and tunnel are underground, and remained useful under the PTBT. Intentional cratering tests are borderline; they occurred under the treaty, were sometimes protested, and generally overlooked if the test was declared to be a peaceful use.) Purpose (Note: Include weapons development, weapon effects, safety test, transport safety test, war, science, joint verification and industrial/peaceful, which may be further broken down.)	Device (Note: Designations for test items where known, "?" indicates some uncertainty about the preceding value, nicknames for particular devices in quotes. This category of information is often not officially disclosed.)	Yield (Note: Estimated energy yield in tons, kilotons, and megatons. A ton of TNT equivalent is defined as 4.184 gigajoules (1 gigacalorie).)	Fallout (Note: Radioactive emission to the atmosphere aside from prompt neutrons, where known. The measured species is only iodine-131 if mentioned, otherwise it is all species. No entry means unknown, probably none if underground and "all" if not; otherwise notation for whether measured on the site only or off the site, where known, and the measured amount of radioactivity released.)	References	Notes
Mill Yard	October 9, 1985 20:40:00.128	PST (–8 hrs)	NTS Area U12n.20 37.20862°N 116.20615°W	2,203 m (7,228 ft) – 371 m (1,217 ft)	underground cavity in tunnel, weapon effect		75 t	Venting detected, 6 Ci (220 GBq)		
Diamond Beech	October 9, 1985 23:20:00.086	PST (–8 hrs)	NTS Area U12n.19 37.20962°N 116.21097°W	2,230 m (7,320 ft) – 404.5 m (1,327 ft)	tunnel, weapon effect		2.5 kt	Venting detected, 1 Ci (37 GBq)		Also a containment performance test
Roquefort	October 16, 1985 21:35:00.086	PST (–8 hrs)	NTS Area U4as 37.1103°N 116.12309°W	1,341 m (4,400 ft) – 415 m (1,362 ft)	underground shaft, weapons development		20 kt	Venting detected		
Abo	October 30, 1985 16:00:00.087	PST (–8 hrs)	NTS Area U3mc 37.05057°N 116.03687°W	1,202 m (3,944 ft) – 196.29 m (644.0 ft)	underground shaft, weapons development		10 t	Venting detected, less than 30 Ci (1,100 GBq)		
Goldstone	December 28, 1985 19:01:00.089	PST (–8 hrs)	NTS Area U20ao 37.23775°N 116.47364°W	1,887 m (6,191 ft) – 549 m (1,801 ft)	underground shaft, weapons development		60 kt			Project Excalibur X-ray laser development test
Glencoe	March 22, 1986 16:15:00.08	PST (–8 hrs)	NTS Area U4i 37.08296°N 116.06691°W	1,233 m (4,045 ft) – 609.6 m (2,000 ft)	underground shaft, weapons development		29 kt	Venting detected off site, 0.1 Ci (3.7 GBq)		
Mighty Oak	April 10, 1986 14:08:30.095	PST (–8 hrs)	NTS Area U12t.08 37.21827°N 116.18353°W	2,084 m (6,837 ft) – 394.4 m (1,294 ft)	tunnel, weapon effect		20 kt	Venting detected on site, 36 kCi (1,300 TBq)		Radiation effect test on military hardware
Mogollon	April 20, 1986 15:12:30.074	PST (–8 hrs)	NTS Area U3li 37.01164°N 116.04679°W	1,187 m (3,894 ft) – 259.4 m (851 ft)	underground shaft, weapons development		1.5 kt			
Jefferson	April 22, 1986 14:30:00.086	PST (–8 hrs)	NTS Area U20ai 37.26406°N 116.44109°W	1,955 m (6,414 ft) – 609 m (1,998 ft)	underground shaft, weapons development	W56	80 kt	I-131 venting detected, 0		Stockpile confidence test, partial-yield test of an aging W56
Panamint	May 21, 1986 13:59:00.083	PST (–8 hrs)	NTS Area U2gb 37.12499°N 116.06126°W	1,259 m (4,131 ft) – 480 m (1,570 ft)	underground shaft, weapons development		1 kt	Venting detected, 3 Ci (110 GBq)		
Tajo	June 5, 1986 15:04:00.064	PST (–8 hrs)	NTS Area U7bl 37.09842°N 116.01618°W	1,289 m (4,229 ft) – 518.2 m (1,700 ft)	underground shaft, weapons development		67 kt			
Cybar	July 17, 1986 21:00:00.06	PST (–8 hrs)	NTS Area U19ar 37.27862°N 116.35649°W	2,017 m (6,617 ft) – 627 m (2,057 ft)	underground shaft, weapons development		119 kt	I-131 venting detected, 0		
Cornucopia	July 24, 1986 15:05:00.086	PST (–8 hrs)	NTS Area U2ga(s) 37.1427°N 116.07199°W	1,287 m (4,222 ft) – 381 m (1,250 ft)	underground shaft, weapons development		8 kt	I-131 venting detected, 0		
Galveston	September 4, 1986 16:09:00.057	PST (–8 hrs)	NTS Area U19af 37.23968°N 116.36864°W	2,018 m (6,621 ft) – 487.1 m (1,598 ft)	underground shaft, weapons development	B61	350 t			B61 stockpile confidence test
Aleman	September 11, 1986 14:57:00.11	PST (–8 hrs)	NTS Area U3kz 37.06903°N 116.05056°W	1,218 m (3,996 ft) – 502.6 m (1,649 ft)	underground shaft, weapons development		100 t			
Labquark	September 30, 1986 22:30:00.102	PST (–8 hrs)	NTS Area U19an 37.30003°N 116.30831°W	2,100 m (6,900 ft) – 616 m (2,021 ft)	underground shaft, weapons development		140 kt	Venting detected, 16 Ci (590 GBq)		Project Excalibur X-ray laser development test
