= Operation Aqueduct =

Series of 1980s and 1990s US nuclear tests

Aqueduct

Information
- Country: United States
- Test site: NTS Area 12, Rainier Mesa; NTS Area 19, 20, Pahute Mesa; NTS, Areas 1–4, 6–10, Yucca Flat
- Period: 1989–1990
- Number of tests: 10
- Test type: underground shaft, tunnel
- Max. yield: 150 kilotonnes of TNT (630 TJ)

Test series chronology

The United States's Aqueduct nuclear test series was a group of 10 nuclear tests conducted in 1989–1990. These tests (Note: A bomb test may be a salvo test, defined as two or more explosions "where a period of time between successive individual explosions does not exceed 5 seconds and where the burial points of all explosive devices can be connected by segments of straight lines, each of them connecting two burial points and does not exceed 40 kilometers in length". Mikhailov, V. N. "Catalog of World Wide Nuclear Testing". Begell-Atom. Archived from the original on April 26, 2014.) followed the Operation Cornerstone series and preceded the Operation Sculpin series.

== Lists of the nuclear tests ==
United States' Aqueduct series tests and detonations
Name (Note: The US, France and Great Britain have code-named their test events, while the USSR and China did not, and therefore have only test numbers (with some exceptions – Soviet peaceful explosions were named). Word translations into English in parentheses unless the name is a proper noun. A dash followed by a number indicates a member of a salvo event. The US also sometimes named the individual explosions in such a salvo test, which results in "name1 – 1(with name2)". If test is canceled or aborted, then the row data like date and location discloses the intended plans, where known.)	Date time (UT)	Local time zone (Note: To convert the UT time into standard local, add the number of hours in parentheses to the UT time; for local daylight saving time, add one additional hour. If the result is earlier than 00:00, add 24 hours and subtract 1 from the day; if it is 24:00 or later, subtract 24 hours and add 1 to the day. Historical time zone data obtained from the IANA time zone database.)	Location (Note: Rough place name and a latitude/longitude reference; for rocket-carried tests, the launch location is specified before the detonation location, if known. Some locations are extremely accurate; others (like airdrops and space blasts) may be quite inaccurate. "~" indicates a likely pro-forma rough location, shared with other tests in that same area.)	Elevation + height (Note: Elevation is the ground level at the point directly below the explosion relative to sea level; height is the additional distance added or subtracted by tower, balloon, shaft, tunnel, air drop or other contrivance. For rocket bursts the ground level is "N/A". In some cases it is not clear if the height is absolute or relative to ground, for example, Plumbbob/John. No number or units indicates the value is unknown, while "0" means zero. Sorting on this column is by elevation and height added together.)	Delivery (Note: Atmospheric, airdrop, balloon, gun, cruise missile, rocket, surface, tower, and barge are all disallowed by the Partial Nuclear Test Ban Treaty. Sealed shaft and tunnel are underground, and remained useful under the PTBT. Intentional cratering tests are borderline; they occurred under the treaty, were sometimes protested, and generally overlooked if the test was declared to be a peaceful use.) Purpose (Note: Include weapons development, weapon effects, safety test, transport safety test, war, science, joint verification and industrial/peaceful, which may be further broken down.)	Device (Note: Designations for test items where known, "?" indicates some uncertainty about the preceding value, nicknames for particular devices in quotes. This category of information is often not officially disclosed.)	Yield (Note: Estimated energy yield in tons, kilotons, and megatons. A ton of TNT equivalent is defined as 4.184 gigajoules (1 gigacalorie).)	Fallout (Note: Radioactive emission to the atmosphere aside from prompt neutrons, where known. The measured species is only iodine-131 if mentioned, otherwise it is all species. No entry means unknown, probably none if underground and "all" if not; otherwise notation for whether measured on the site only or off the site, where known, and the measured amount of radioactivity released.)	References	Notes
Hornitos	October 31, 1989 15:30:00.085	PST (–8 hrs)	NTS Area U20bc 37.26305°N 116.49161°W	1,846 m (6,056 ft)–562.94 m (1,846.9 ft)	underground shaft, weapons development		150 kt			
Muleshoe	November 15, 1989 20:20:00.119	PST (–8 hrs)	NTS Area U7bk 37.10647°N 116.01425°W	1,311 m (4,301 ft)–244.45 m (802.0 ft)	underground shaft, weapons development		less than 20 kt			
Whiteface - 1	December 20, 1989 22:00:00.06	PST (–8 hrs)	NTS Area U3lp 37.02584°N 116.03197°W	1,216 m (3,990 ft)–196.9 m (646 ft)	underground shaft, safety experiment		less than 20 kt			Simultaneous, same hole.
Whiteface - 2	December 20, 1989 22:00:00.06	PST (–8 hrs)	NTS Area U3lp 37.02584°N 116.03197°W	1,216 m (3,990 ft) +	underground shaft, safety experiment		less than 20 kt			Simultaneous, same hole.
Metropolis	March 10, 1990 15:00:00.083	PST (–8 hrs)	NTS Area U2gh 37.11246°N 116.05605°W	1,246 m (4,088 ft)–469.4 m (1,540 ft)	underground shaft, weapons development		44 kt	Venting detected, 6 Ci (220 GBq)		
Bowie	April 6, 1990 17:00:00.047	PST (–8 hrs)	NTS Area U3mk 37.06765°N 115.99288°W	1,271 m (4,170 ft)–213.4 m (700 ft)	underground shaft, weapons development		100 t			
Bullion	June 13, 1990 16:00:00.079	PST (–8 hrs)	NTS Area U20bd 37.26155°N 116.42101°W	1,950 m (6,400 ft)–673.9 m (2,211 ft)	underground shaft, weapons development		150 kt			
Justin	June 21, 1990 18:15:00.0	PST (–8 hrs)	NTS Area U6e 36.99279°N 116.00536°W	1,174 m (3,852 ft)–350.5 m (1,150 ft)	underground shaft, weapons development		2 kt			
Mineral Quarry - 2 (with Randsburg)	July 25, 1990 15:00:00.06	PST (–8 hrs)	NTS Area U12n.22 37.20682°N 116.21514°W	2,216 m (7,270 ft)–389.5 m (1,278 ft)	tunnel, weapon effect		10 kt	Venting detected, 0.5 Ci (19 GBq)		Simultaneous, same drifts.
Randsburg - 1 (with Mineral Quarry)	July 25, 1990 15:00:00.0	PST (–8 hrs)	NTS Area U12n.22a 37.20682°N 116.21514°W	2,216 m (7,270 ft) +	tunnel, weapons development		less than 20 kt			Simultaneous, same drifts.
Sundown - 1	September 20, 1990 16:15:00.0	PST (–8 hrs)	NTS Area U1d 37.0382°N 116.05756°W	1,206 m (3,957 ft)–270.4 m (887 ft)	underground shaft, safety experiment		less than 20 kt			Simultaneous, same drifts.
Sundown - 2	September 20, 1990 16:15:00.0	PST (–8 hrs)	NTS Area U1d 37.0382°N 116.05756°W	1,206 m (3,957 ft) +	underground shaft, safety experiment		less than 20 kt			Simultaneous, same drifts.
Ledoux	September 27, 1990 18:02:46.0	PST (–8 hrs)	NTS Area U1a.01 37.00695°N 116.05899°W	1,191 m (3,907 ft)–291 m (955 ft)	underground shaft, weapons development		less than 20 kt			Experimentally pumping a laser from a nuclear device.
