= List of United States nuclear weapons tests =

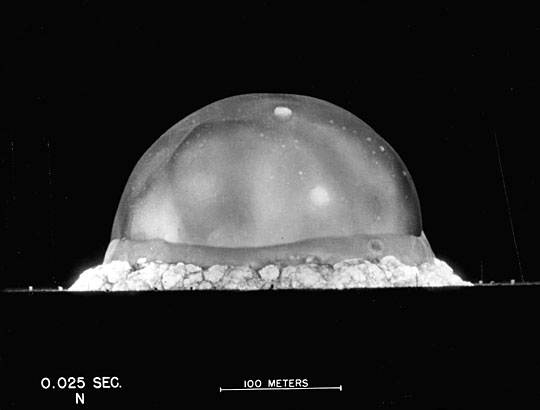
Trinity, part of the Manhattan Project, was the first ever nuclear explosion.

The United States performed nuclear weapons tests from 1945 to 1992 as part of the nuclear arms race. By official count, there were 1,054 nuclear tests conducted, including 215 atmospheric and underwater tests. (Note: Discrepancies between the below table and the official report include 28 tests actually carried out by the United Kingdom at the NTS; four aborted tests in Operation Fishbowl; one test, Anvil/Peninsula, that jammed during lowering in its shaft and was abandoned; and five salvo tests listed as two enumerated tests each because they were treated that way when eventually described to the public, rather than standing on the treaty definition of a salvo test.)

Most of the tests took place at the Nevada Test Site (NNSS/NTS), the Pacific Proving Grounds in the Marshall Islands or off Kiritimati Island in the Pacific, plus three in the Atlantic Ocean. Ten other tests took place at various locations in the United States, including Alaska, Nevada (outside of the NNSS/NTS), Colorado, Mississippi, and New Mexico.

== United States nuclear tests ==
Summary of US nuclear testing series
Series or years	Years covered	Tests (Note: Includes all tests with potential for nuclear fission or fusion explosion, including combat use, singleton tests, salvo tests, zero yield fails, safety experiments, and bombs incapacitated by accidents but still intended to be fired. It does not include hydronuclear and subcritical tests, and misfires of a device which was subsequently fired successfully.)	Devices fired	Devices with unknown yield	Peaceful use tests	Non-PTBT tests (Note: Number of tests which would have been in violation of the Partial Test Ban Treaty of 1963, such as atmospheric, space or underwater tests. Some "peaceful use" cratering tests which should have been violations were protested, and later quietly dropped.)	Yield range (kilotons) (Note: "Small" refers to a value greater than zero but less than 0.5 kt.)	Total yield (kilotons) (Note: Some yields are described like "< 20 kt"; such are scored at one half of the numeric amount, i.e., yield of 10k in this example. "Unknown yield" adds nothing to the total.)	Notes
Trinity	1945	1	1			1	21	21	First nuclear weapons test, conducted as part of the Manhattan Project. Tested the Mark 3 Fat Man design.
Crossroads	1946	2	2			2	21	42	First postwar test series
Sandstone	1948	3	3			3	18 to 49	104	The first use of "levitated" cores made of oralloy. Tested components for Mark 4 design.
Ranger	1951	5	5			5	1 to 22	40	First tests at the Nevada Test Site. Operation originally named "Operation Faust".
Greenhouse	1951	4	4			4	46 to 225	398	George shot was the first thermonuclear device, an unweaponized physics experiment; Item shot was first boosted fission weapon.
Buster-Jangle	1951	7	7			7	small to 31	72	The first series in which troop maneuvers (Desert Rock exercises) were performed
Tumbler-Snapper	1952	8	8			8	1 to 31	104	First boosted fission weapon tests in the continental United States
Ivy	1952	2	2			2	500 to 10,400	10,900	Mike shot was the first multi-megaton thermonuclear weapon, first death related to nuclear testing, of sampler pilot. King shot remains largest fission weapon to not attempt boosting.
Upshot-Knothole	1953	11	11			11	small to 61	252	First thermonuclear weapon tests in the continental US. 18,000 men exposed in Desert Rock V up to 26.6 REM. 84 exceeded current yearly limits of 5 REM/yr.
Castle	1954	6	6			6	110 to 15,000	48,200	Bravo shot inspired secret Project 4.1 to study fallout victims. It over-produced by 250% of expected yield, causing fallout over a wide area.
Teapot	1955	14	14			14	1 to 43	167	
Wigwam	1955	1	1			1	30	30	2,000 feet (610 m) underwater
Project 56	1955–1956	4	4			4	0 to 0	0	
Redwing	1956	17	17			17	small to 5,000	20,820	Cherokee was first US airdrop of thermonuclear weapon, Zuni was first US test of three-stage thermonuclear weapon. First use of the "materials substitution method", a lead tamper instead of a natural uranium one. First series to set with "yield budget" of 20 Mt, and fission yield (effectively fallout) budget, ultimately releasing 10 Mt. Competition between UCRL and LASL over budget allocation was high.
Project 57	1957	1	1			1	0	0	The first safety test, asking whether an improperly ignited bomb (as in a plane crash) would cause a nuclear blast.
Plumbbob	1957	29	29			25	0 to 74	345	Included the largest atmospheric test in continental US, shot Hood
Project 58+58A	1957	4	4			1	small to 1	1	Four more safety tests
Hardtack I	1958	35	35			35	0 to 9,300	35,628	A series in the Pacific Proving Ground, including three rocket boosted high altitude tests called Operation Newsreel
Argus	1958	3	3			3	2	4	Also known as Operation Floral before becoming Argus for security reasons. Tested three weapons in the South Atlantic, trying to create an artificial energy belt in the magnetosphere.
Hardtack II	1958	37	37			24	0 to 22	46	Meant to squeeze all possible testing into the time before Eisenhower's test ban started on 30 October 1958. Planned as "Operation Millrace", changed to HT II when a science panel recommended to "stop testing after the Hardtack series."
Nougat	1961–1962	44	44		1	2	small to 67	357	First all-underground test series. Included first Operation Plowshare shot "Gnome" in Carlsbad, New Mexico, which was detonated in an underground salt dome.
Sunbeam	1962	4	4			4	small to 2	2	Aka Operation Dominic II. Test of small tactical warheads, including the man-portable "Davy Crockett". Last atmospheric test series over CONUS. The Army's part of Sunbeam was Operation Ivy Flats.
Dominic	1962–1963	31	31			31	2 to 9,960	34,640	Frigate Bird was the only test of a live warhead on a strategic missile system, the UGM-27 Polaris. Series also included three high-altitude tests known as Operation Fishbowl, separated out in this text.
Fishbowl	1962	9	9	4		9	400 to 1,400	2,205	The high altitude rocket part of Operation Dominic. Included several failed tests as the rockets failed for various reasons. Starfish Prime was the largest ever test in outer space.
Storax	1962–1963	47	47		3	1	1 to 115	585	
Roller Coaster	1963	4	4			4	0	0	Storage-transportation safety experiments; measured plutonium dispersal risk.
Niblick	1963–1964	41	43		4		small to 249	698	
Whetstone	1964–1965	46	49		4	1	small to 51	476	
Flintlock	1965–1966	47	49		2		small to 365	1,891	
Latchkey	1966–1967	38	38		3		small to 870	1,831	
Crosstie	1967–1968	48	57	5	4	2	small to 1,300	3,638	
Bowline	1968–1969	47	58		2	1	small to 1,150	2,152	
Mandrel	1969–70	52	78	1	2		small to 1,900	5,528	Mandrel was largest underground test at Nevada Test Site.
Emery	1970–1971	16	24	2			small to 220	565	
Grommet	1971–1972	34	39		1		small to 4,800	5,200	Included Cannikin, the largest underground explosion ever at 5 Mt, fired under the Aleutian island Amchitka.
Toggle	1972–1973	28	35		1		small to 250	958	
Arbor	1973–1974	18	20				small to 150	274	
Bedrock	1974–1975	27	29				small to 750	2,840	
Anvil	1975–1976	21	21				0 to 1,000	5,993	
Fulcrum	1976–1977	21	24				small to 140	635	
Cresset	1977–1978	22	23				0 to 150	1,122	
Quicksilver	1978–1979	16	16				1 to 140	717	
Tinderbox	1979–1980	14	14				1 to 140	452	
Guardian	1980–1981	14	14				1 to 140	322	
Praetorian	1981–1982	19	20				1 to 140	938	
Phalanx	1982–1983	18	19				1 to 143	365	
Fusileer	1983–1984	16	16				small to 150	521	
Grenadier	1984–1985	16	16				3 to 150	670	
Charioteer	1985–1986	16	16				small to 140	549	
Musketeer	1986–1987	14	16				3 to 150	970	
Touchstone	1987–1988	13	15				2 to 150	696	
Cornerstone	1988–1989	11	17				1 to 150	436	
Aqueduct	1989–1990	10	13				small to 150	426	
Sculpin	1990–1991	7	9				2 to 140	478	
Julin	1991–1992	7	9				small to 100	172	The last test series, cut off by the negotiation of the Comprehensive Test Ban Treaty
Totals	1945-Jul-16 to 1992-Sep-23	1032	1132	12	27	231	0 to 15,000	196,552	Total country yield is 36.3% of all nuclear testing.

== Timeline ==
Graphical timeline of United States atmospheric nuclear weapons tests

== Sources ==
- Yang, Xiaoping; North, Robert; Romney, Carl (August 2000). CMR Nuclear Explosion Database (Revision 3) (Report). SMDC Monitoring Research.
- Andryushi, LA; Voloshin, N.P.; Ilkaev, R.I.; Matushchenko, A.M.; Ryabev, L.D.; Strukov, V.G.; Chernyshev, A.K.; Yudin, Yu.A. Mikhailov, V.N. (ed.). "Catalog of Worldwide Nuclear Testing". Archived from the original on 2013-12-19.
- Wm Robert Johnston, PhD. "Nuclear Weapons". Johnston's Archive.
