= Plumbbob Hood =

1957 United States nuclear test

- The detonation and mushroom cloud produced by the Hood shot, seen in an aerial film

Information
- Country: United States
- Test series: Operation Plumbbob
- Test site: Nevada Test Site
- Date: 5 July 1957; 69 years ago
- Period: Cold War
- Test type: Atmospheric test
- Yield: 74 kilotonnes of TNT (310 TJ)

Test chronology

Plumbbob Hood, also known by the Defense Threat Reduction Agency as Shot HOOD, was a top-secret nuclear test conducted in Area 9 of the Yucca Flat at the Nevada National Security Site (NTS) on July 5, 1957, as part of Operation Plumbbob, a series of nuclear tests. It was the largest atmospheric nuclear test ever carried out at the Nevada Test Site and in the Continental United States.

== Background ==
The Hood nuclear device was sponsored, designed, and built for the United States Atomic Energy Commission by the University of California Radiation Laboratory (UCRL). The primary objective of the test was to evaluate nuclear yield and blast, thermal, and radiation phenomena. To fulfill this objective, UCRL and the Los Alamos National Laboratory fielded scientific and diagnostic experiments to study the characteristics of the detonation. The Armed Forces Special Weapons Project of the Department of Defense (DOD) also performed experiments to determine the effects of the detonation on military equipment, material, structures, and ordnance.

The test was originally scheduled to be carried out on June 27, 1957, although the shot was delayed due to a technical misfire of the Plumbbob Diablo shot that was to be detonated prior to Hood. Trenches that were initially dug for the Plumbbob Shasta shot were also used for Hood.

== Detonation ==
At the time of the detonation, the wind was calm at surface level. The device was detonated from a balloon located approximately 1,500 feet (460 m) above northeastern portions of the Yucca Flat at 4:40 am (PT), setting bushes on fire and sending a thermal wave across the land which it was detonated over. Minutes after the detonation, the nuclear cloud reached 35,000–48,000 feet (11,000–15,000 m) in the atmosphere where the winds were from the southwest at 19 and 31 knots respectively. The residual radiation consisted primarily of neutron-induced activity around ground zero. It was noted that the blast caused several small fires near trenches where soldiers were sheltering.

=== Desert Rock VII and Project 52.1 ===
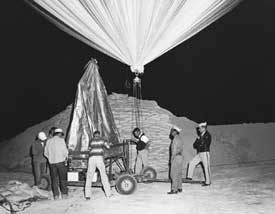
The balloon used to lift the Hood shot

Ground activity during shot Hood included Exercise Desert Rock VII. As part of this exercise, the armed services fielded eight projects to evaluate military equipment and tactics. In the Hood shot, the Marine Corps conducted a troop maneuver in the test area immediately after the detonation. This maneuver, which involved a Marine brigade and supporting units, included helicopter airlifts of assault troops, tactical air support, and air resupply. This was the largest single military activity in Operation Plumbbob. Over 3,000 DOD personnel participated in the eight projects of Exercise Desert Rock VII, the Army testing and training program conducted during Operation Plumbbob. These projects included two troop observer and indoctrination projects, one troop test, two radiological training projects, and three technical service projects. During the shot, observers and participants in the exercise crouched in trenches that were around 5.5 feet (1.7 m) deep. Observers were also issued gas masks to protect against a large non-radioactive dust cloud that was expected to occur as a result of the Hood shot. The shot resulted in some trenches caving inward, although nobody inside sustained injuries.

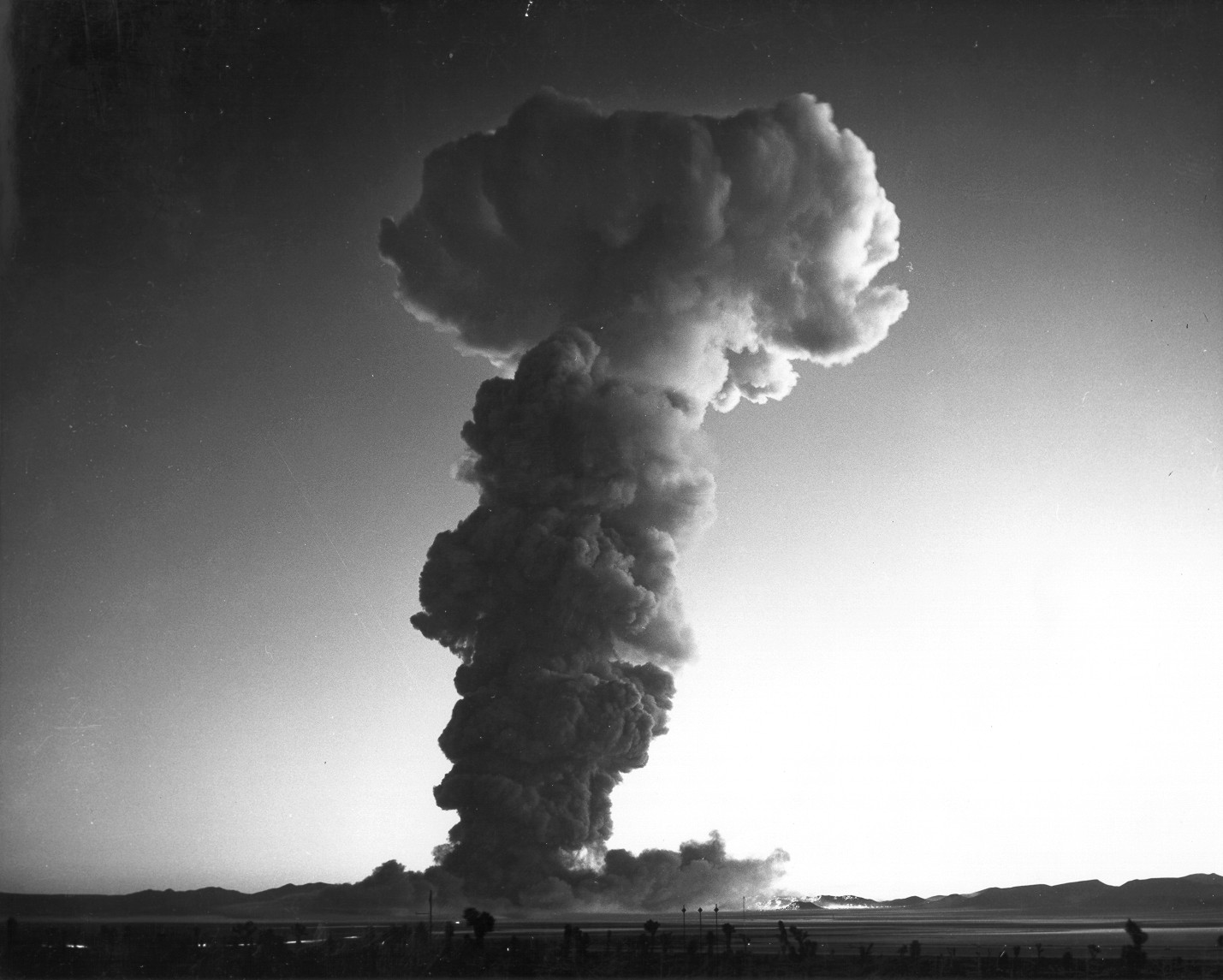
The mushroom cloud produced by the shot

The largest group of participants were the 2,025 Marines who performed Project 52.1. This group consisted of the 4th Marine Corps Provisional Atomic Exercise Brigade and support units who were not present at the NTS. The project tested a task force assault following a nuclear detonation. Most of the participants in this exercise observed the detonation from trenches nearly five kilometers southwest of ground zero. Elements of one company watched from an area near the Control Point, more than 12 miles (19 km) south of ground zero. After the detonation, participants conducted a coordinated air-ground maneuver against the attack objective. When the maneuver was over, the Marines were transported to the equipment display area to view the effects of the detonation. In addition to the eight Desert Rock exercises, the DOD conducted four operational training projects at Hood. The Federal Civil Defense Administration (FCDA) conducted another ten projects to assess the effects of nuclear detonations on civilian populations and to evaluate Civil Defense emergency preparedness plans. Department of Defense participation in these projects was limited.

The operational training projects, which involved about 14 United States Air Force personnel and 19 United States Marines, were designed to test service tactics and equipment and to instruct military personnel in the effects of a nuclear detonation. Three of these projects required aircrews to fly their aircraft in the vicinity of the Nevada Test Site to observe or photograph the fireball and the rise of the resulting nuclear cloud. The fourth project evaluated the accuracy of bomb damage assessment equipment on an aircraft. These projects, like those of the test groups, were approved and coordinated by the Test Director.

== Aftermath ==
The Hood shot was the largest atmospheric test ever carried out in the continental United States, and was the largest in United States history at the time. The Las Vegas Review-Journal named the shot as one of the five most significant nuclear tests to take place at the Nevada Test Site, along with Ranger Able, Upshot-Knothole Harry, Teapot Apple-2 and Julin Divider.

== Gallery ==
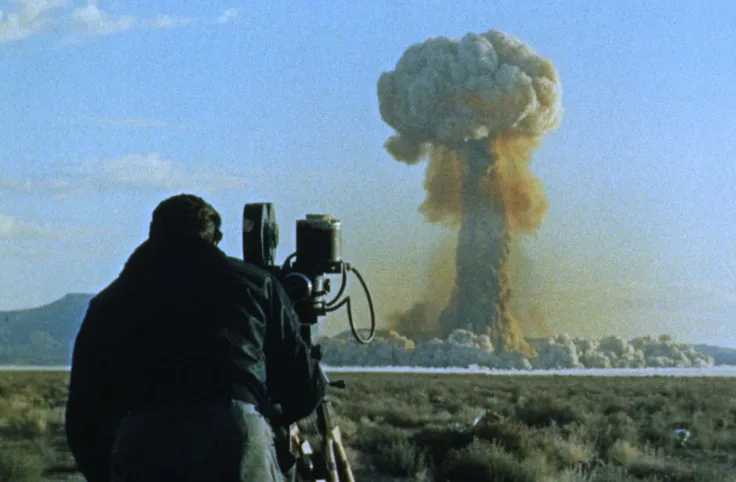
An airmen from the 1352d Photographic Squadron filming the blast

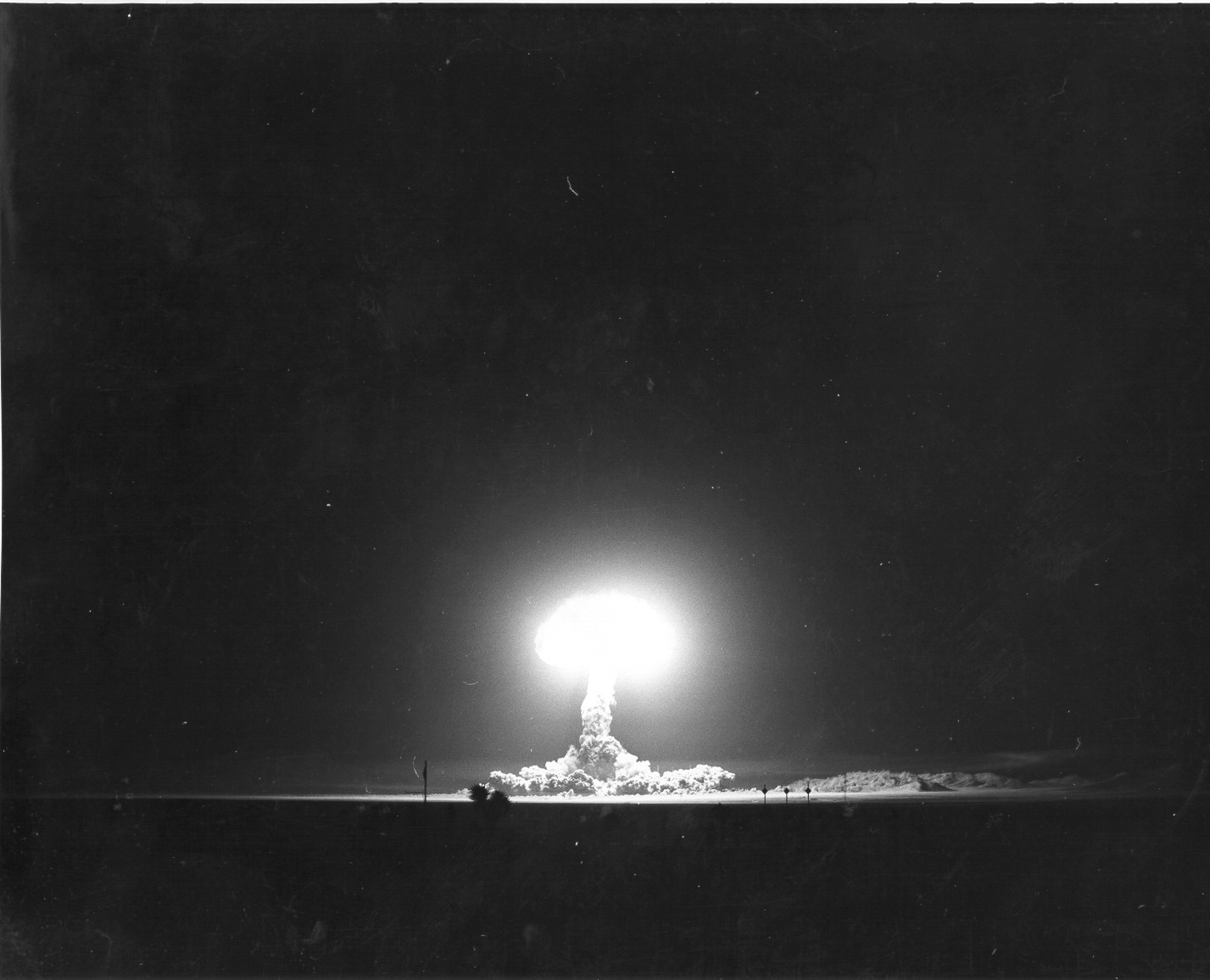
The fireball from the shot

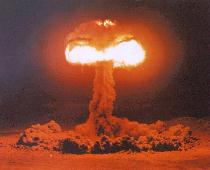
An aerial shot of the mushroom cloud produced from Hood

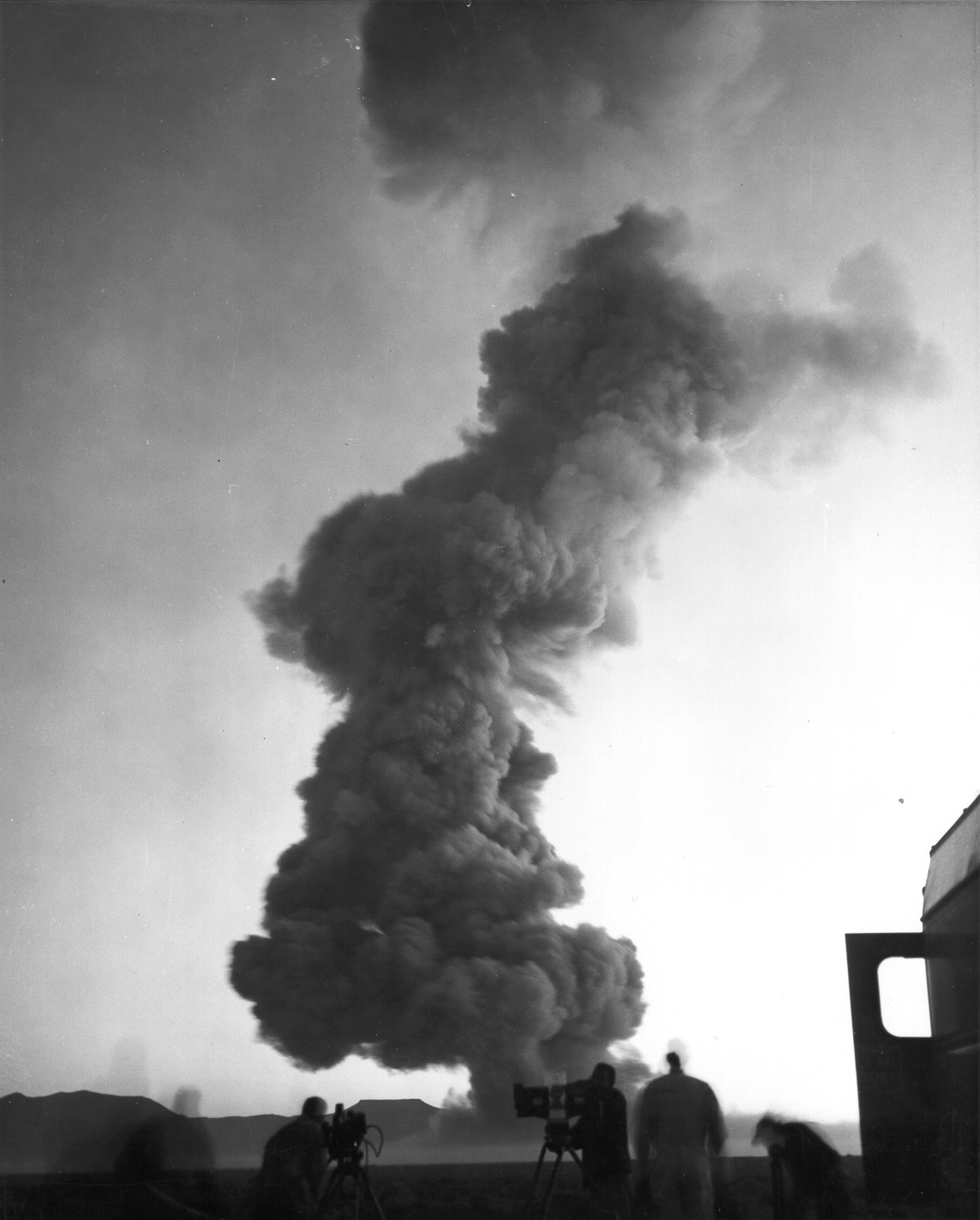
The mushroom cloud produced by the shot forming

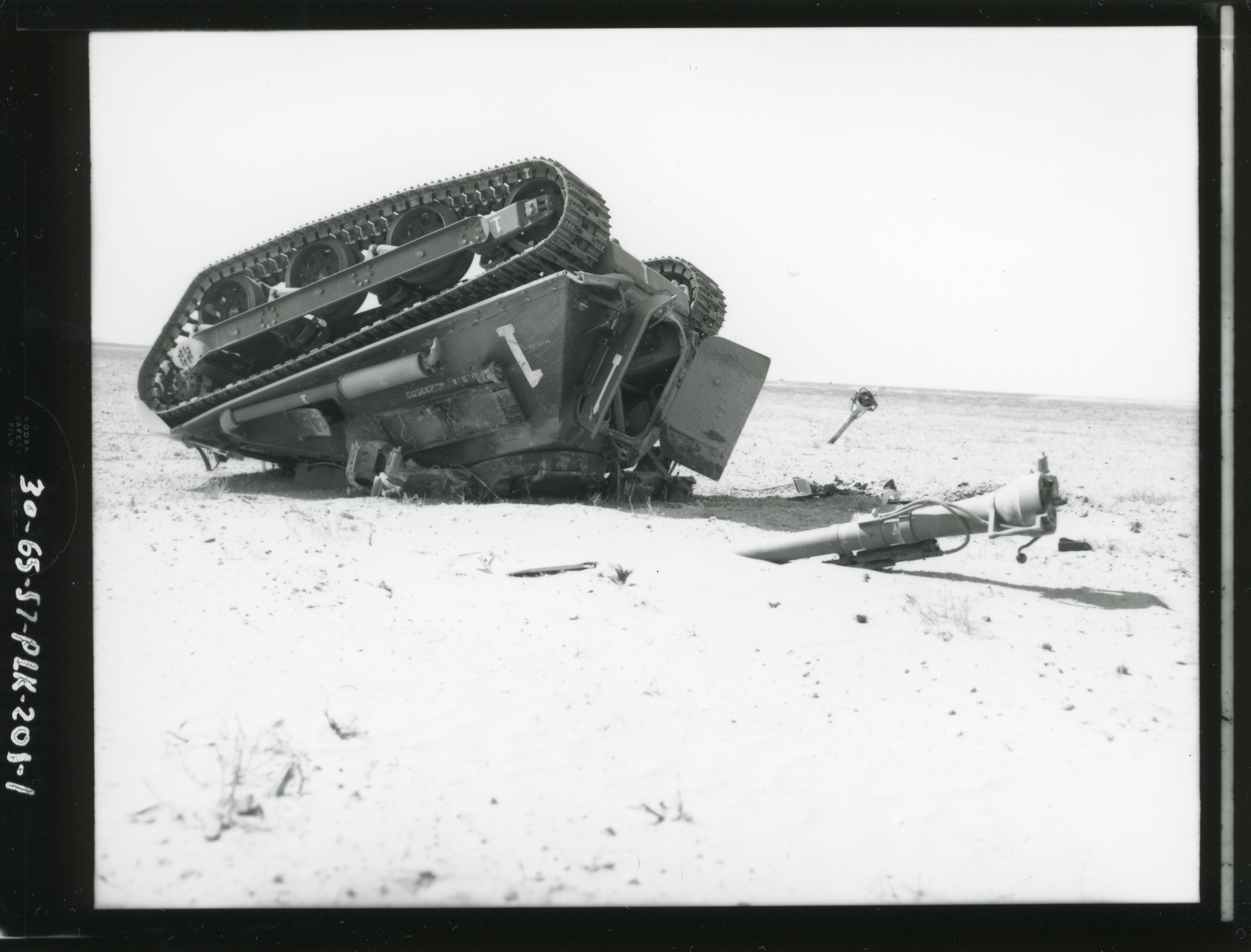
M50 Ontos intentionally damaged during the Hood shot

== See also ==
- List of United States nuclear weapons tests
