= Live fire exercise =

Military exercise using live munitions

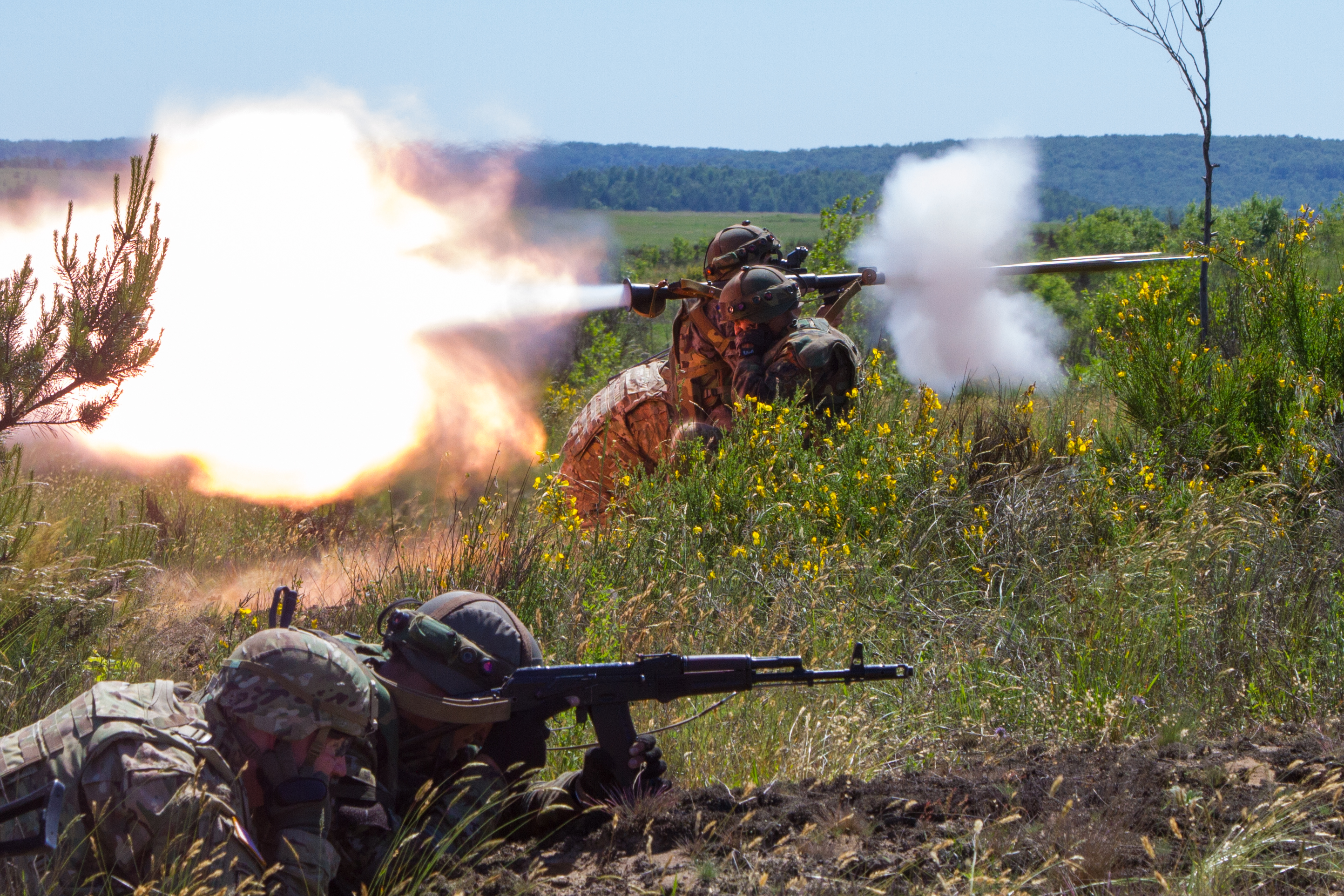
National Guard of Ukraine soldiers firing live munitions during a live fire exercise

A live fire exercise (LFX) is a military exercise in which live ammunition and ordnance is used, as opposed to blanks or dummies. The term can also be found in non-military usage.

== Military ==
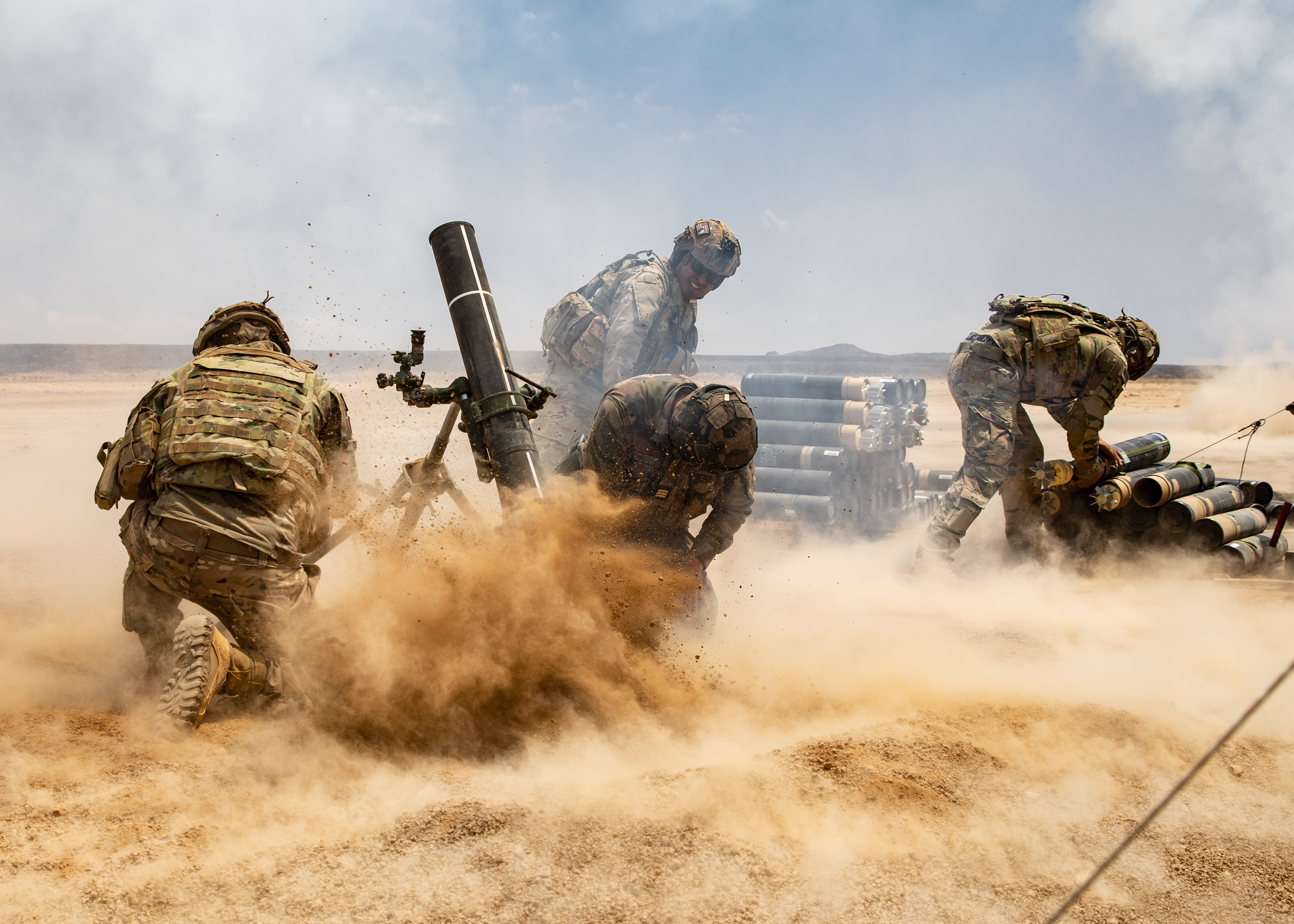
French and American soldiers firing live mortar rounds during training

Militaries usually use live-fire exercises as an opportunity to use real ammunition in a realistically created combat situation. The area in which these tests are conducted will be devoid of people to avoid casualties, and will likely be owned by the government that authorized the test. Most live-fire tests are conducted either against derelict equipment (such as tanks and ships) or against remotely controlled drones.

The purpose of this type of exercise is twofold: First, it offers recruits the chance to get accustomed to their weapons so that they will know how to properly operate them. Secondly, this provides soldiers with an opportunity to fire live ammunition without having to worry about an actual enemy returning fire. This allows soldiers to get reacquainted with the feel and time of actually using and expending ammunition, rather than simply simulating the experience. Live-fire exercises of this type can be observed either by remotely controlled cameras or by long-range telescopic devices, such as binoculars.

=== Army ===
An army, being the main branch responsible for land combat, is the best known group that conducts live-fire exercises. Most live-fire exercises occur within the military base where the units conducting the exercise are located. In some cases, an installation may host units from another for a larger live-fire exercise. Equipment tested under these circumstances range from small arms and rocket launcher fire to missile systems and artillery fire. In the case of small arms, the tests are usually proficiency based and aimed at ensuring a soldier can fire their assigned weapons. Missile systems may be test-fired at remotely controlled drones to emulate a situation in which enemy missiles or aircraft are launched at allied or friendly forces, while artillery units can take the opportunity to test shells or fire under adverse weather conditions for a chance to test performance of artillery pieces.

=== Air forces ===
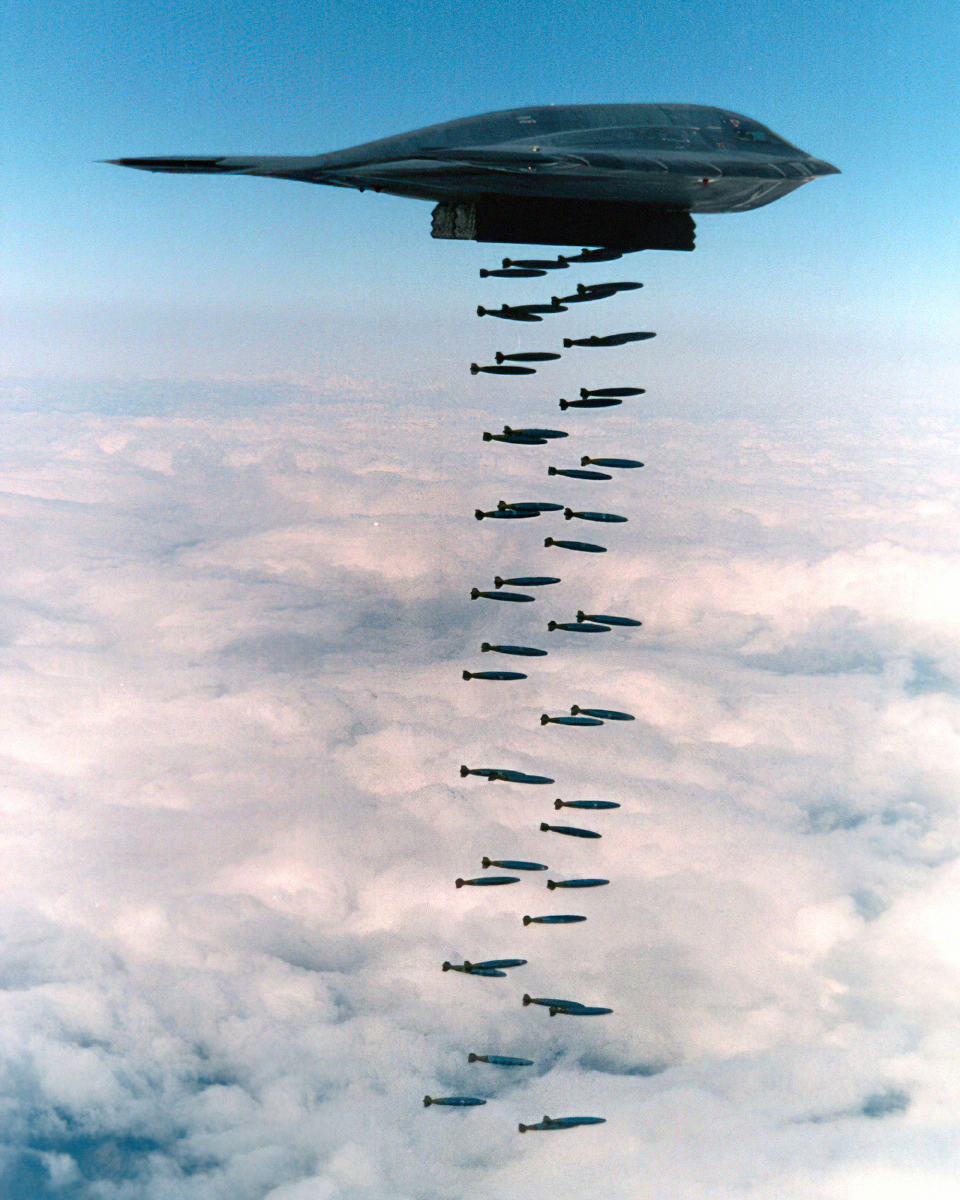
A B-2 Spirit dropping Mk.82 bombs in a 1994 training exercise off Point Mugu in the Pacific Ocean

An air force, due to its nature, usually limits live-fire exercises to the air, although bombing exercises can be conducted as well.

During live-fire exercises dealing with air-to-air combat, remotely controlled drones are frequently used to simulate enemy aircraft. In modern times, the drones are fired on by planes loaded with some type of air-to-air missile, with the objective of the exercise being to destroy the drone. These tests are usually done to ensure that guidance packages within the missiles will work, although they can be done to test other factors, such as a missile's susceptibility to jamming or to see if a new type of dodging technique will work against the missiles fired.

Live-fire exercises involving air-to-surface work are usually centered around precision-guided munitions. In some cases, tests involving bombs will make use of derelict buildings or, even more frequently, vehicles. Live-fire bombing exercises are usually conducted with precision-guided munitions to ensure that they work correctly, but are also used to test new and experimental weapons to ensure that they work as they were originally designed to. These tests are usually monitored by chase planes and by cameras to determine if everything worked as it was originally intended to.

Live-fire exercises may also be conducted against planes for the purpose of testing a plane's susceptibility to SAM sites, or as a means to test a plane's stealth features.

=== Naval forces ===
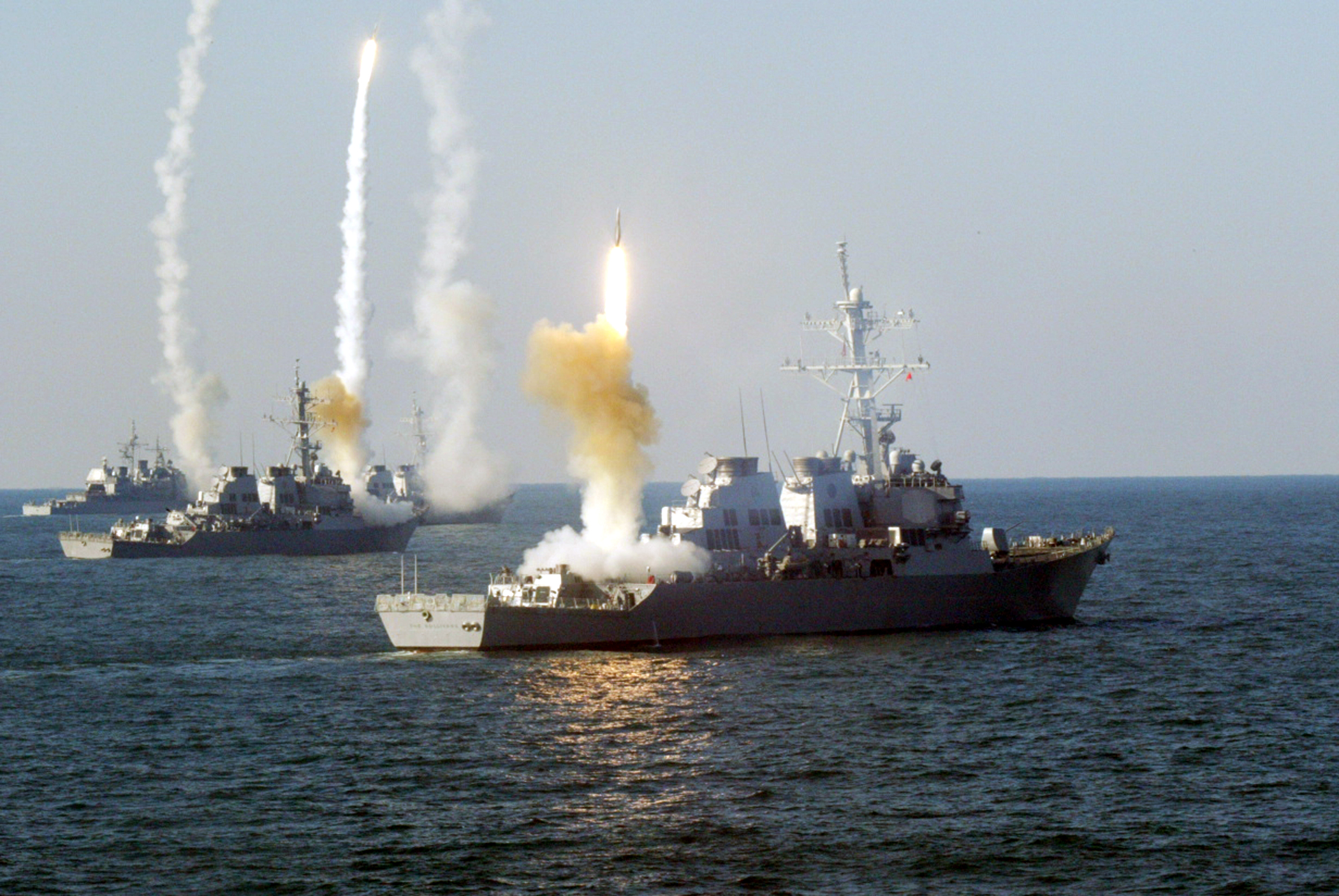
U.S. Navy Arleigh Burke-class destroyers firing anti-missile missiles during a live fire exercise

Naval live-fire exercises may use anti-ship missiles and torpedoes, although tests involving air-to-air and air-to-surface missiles, guns and bombs are not uncommon. Navies conduct live-fire exercises to test elements of an integrated defense system, such as the US Aegis; namely, its ability to track and destroy enemy anti-ship missiles. Tests can also include an integrated defense system's compatibility to fire new missiles or newer versions of the same missile. Live-fire tests are also conducted with a CIWS system, which is designed as the last line of defense for a ship. Surface ships also frequently test-fire the various guns kept and maintained aboard the vessel; these can range from sidearms and rifles up to the 16" guns of the mothballed US Iowa-class battleships. This is done to maintain the skill and knowledge needed to operate the weapon. In the case of aircraft carriers, the pilots assigned to the carrier may conduct air-to-air and air-to-surface missile exercises similar to those of the air force; additionally, these pilots may also conduct live-fire exercises against derelict ships. Recent aircraft carriers have incorporated missile-launching systems, and have taken part in live-fire exercises involving missiles.

For submarines, both fast attack and ballistic missile (or "boomers"), live-fire tests may include firing sea-to-land missiles at targets on shore or launching dummy ballistic missiles; however, the most frequent live-fire exercises conducted by submarines involve firing torpedoes at a target. The best-known tests of torpedoes are those conducted against a derelict ship, typically on a ship from a navy's own mothball fleet that has become too old or obsolete to warrant maintaining. The purpose of these tests is to ensure that the torpedo will work under combat conditions, and such tests can be used to determine whether or not noisemakers or other decoys will have any effect against the unit when launched.

=== Use against training soldiers ===
Some forces, especially more elite ones, have also been known to use live ammunition against their own forces in military exercises, to ensure that the soldiers 'take their training seriously' and get accustomed to being shot at before facing actual enemies. This kind of fire is usually not intended to kill anyone, though practices such as firing into the ground close to a soldier going through an obstacle course pose obvious risks.

A similar live nuclear test was performed by the US Marine Corps Test Unit and US Army Armored Task Force "Razor" during exercise Teapot (Desert Rock VI) at the Nevada Test Site in 1955.

The British SAS and Royal Marines are also known to use live rounds, for the former during the jungle phase of training, and the latter using live rounds in their final exercise. The SAS also use live-fire in regular close quarter combat training.

== Non-military ==
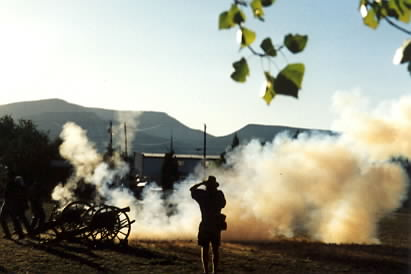
Cannon in an American Civil War reenactment: The large amounts of gunpowder used often affected visibility significantly. Gunners hope for a strong wind that will allow them to continue to see their target.

Weapons tests are not usually conducted by civilian agencies; however, some civilian groups do conduct live-fire tests of equipment to ensure that they work properly or to test new methods. Examples here would include law enforcement agencies (shooting ranges) and controlled explosions by demolition experts. Sometimes, historical reenactments, such as those done for the Battle of Gettysburg, will include live-fire demonstrations so the general public can observe historical equipment in action.

== Other types ==
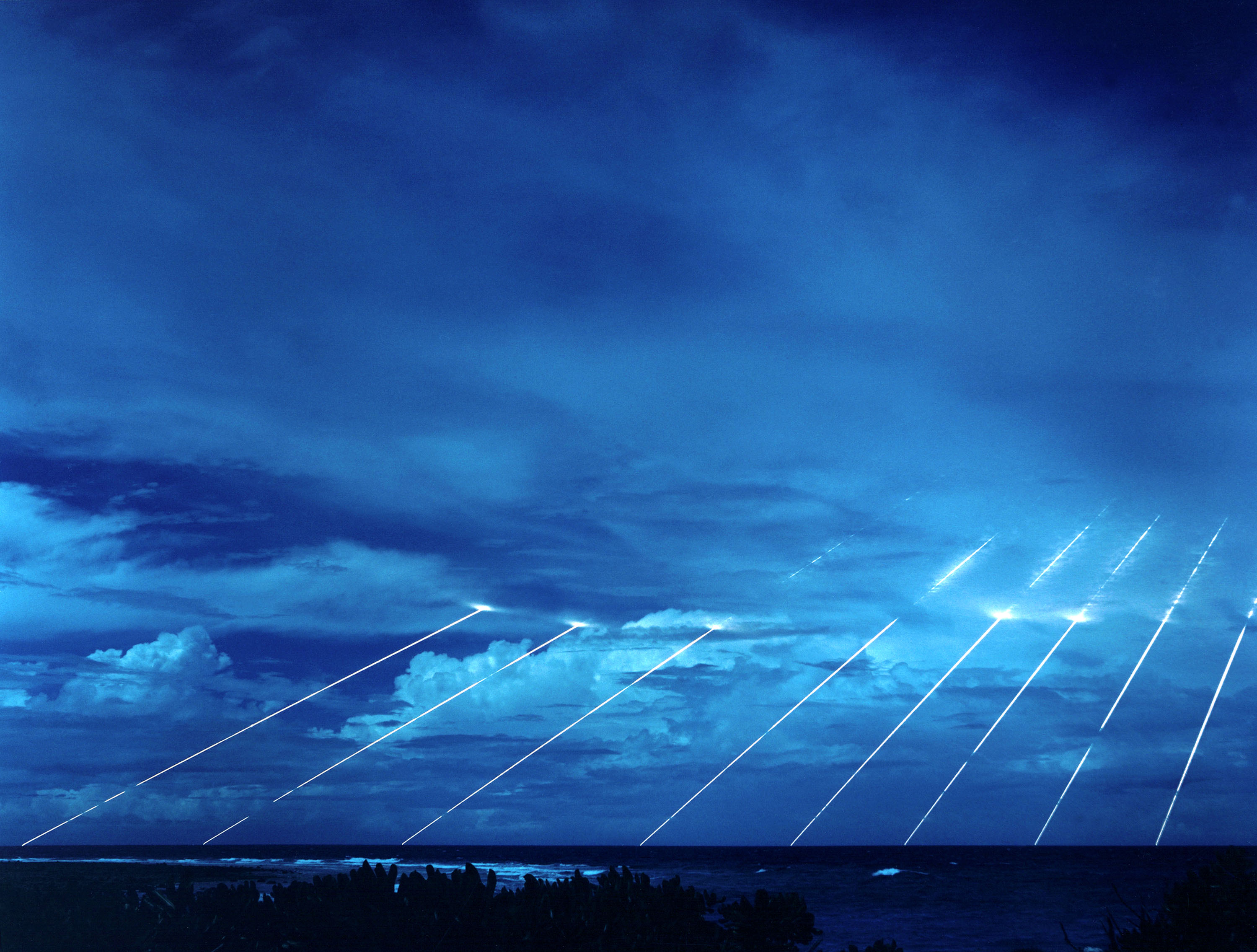
Testing of the LG-118A Peacekeeper re-entry vehicle. All eight vehicles were fired from a single missile. Each line in this long-exposure photograph represents the path of a warhead which, were it live, would detonate with the explosive power of twenty-five Little Boy nuclear bombs.

Other types of live-fire exercises include various nuclear tests conducted by the world's nuclear powers. Also in this group are the live-fire tests of new and exotic weaponry like the Massive Ordnance Air Blast bomb, or "Mother of all Bombs". Also numbered among the unique weapons tests are test fires of intercontinental ballistic missiles (ICBM) and multiple independently targetable reentry vehicles. Recently, a new addition was made to this area when live-fire tests began of the U.S. Strategic Defense Initiative, nicknamed "Star Wars". These live-fire tests are aimed at intercepting incoming enemy ballistic missiles before they can detonate over their designated target.

== Dangers ==
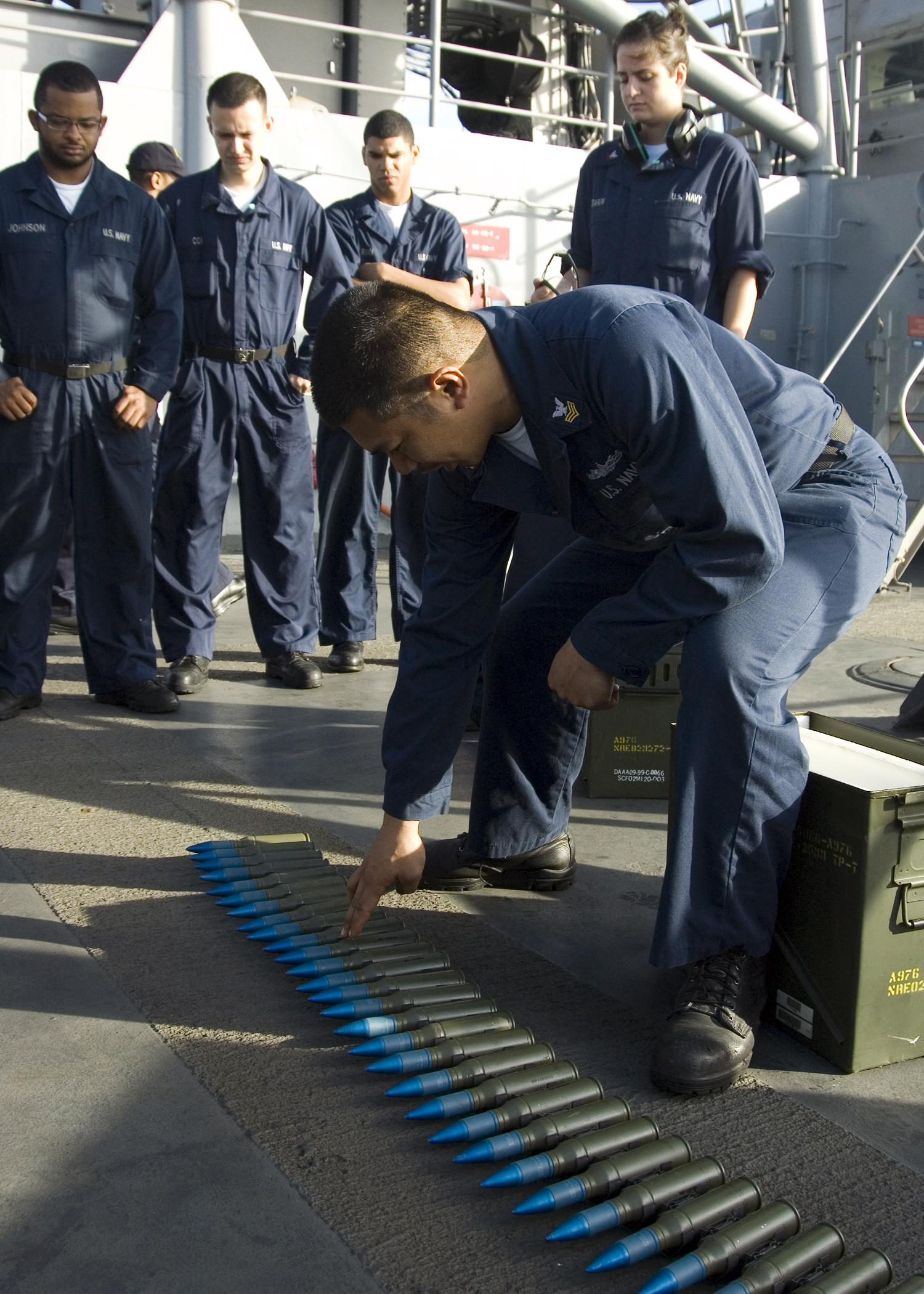
Safety inspection of ammunition before a live fire exercise

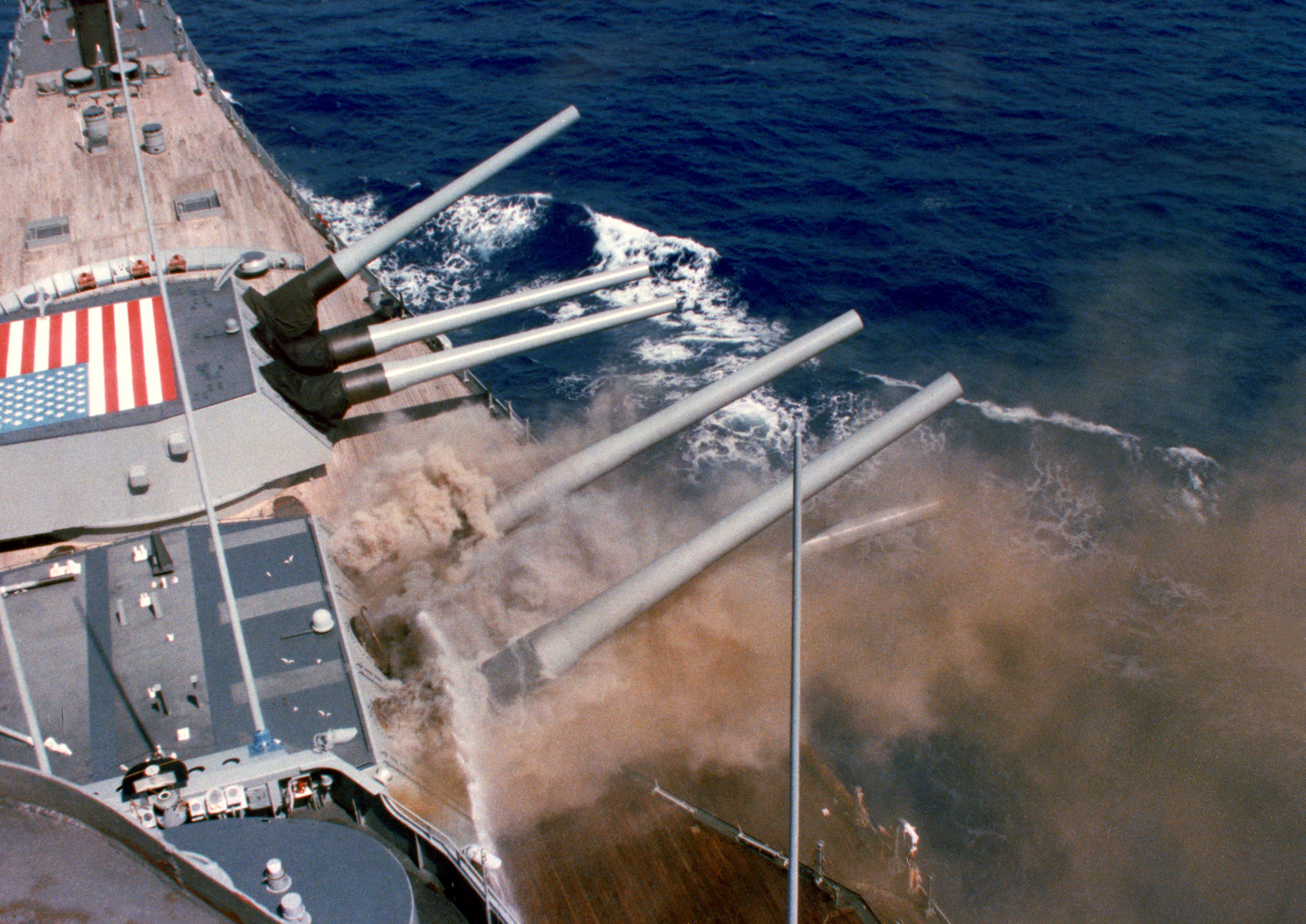
On 19 April 1989, the USS Iowa's No. 2 turret exploded during a routine live-fire training exercise, killing 47 sailors

In any situation in which hazardous materials are involved there exists the potential for a mishap to occur, and when these mishaps occur the results can be as spectacular as they are deadly. All forms of ordnance contain some type of explosive charge to launch and, in most cases, detonate, a weapon. If these charges are inappropriately stored or handled, the result can be serious injury or death to the person and anyone in the immediate vicinity. Other dangers include faulty guidance and sensory information, which can cause guided ordnance to inadvertently target friendly or neutral units. Advances in technology have helped to reduce, and in some cases eliminate, problems with these materials; nonetheless, extreme care must be given when using or implementing them. For example, the handling of gunpowder demands the use of gloves and an area free of static electricity and other potential sparks which could ignite the powder.
