= Project 58/58A =

Series of 1950s American nuclear tests

- Coulomb-C, 0.5 kilotons.

Information
- Country: United States
- Test site: NTS Area 12, Rainier Mesa; NTS, Areas 1–4, 6–10, Yucca Flat
- Period: 1957–1958
- Number of tests: 4
- Test type: dry surface, underground shaft, tunnel
- Max. yield: 500 tonnes of TNT (2,100 GJ)

Test series chronology

Operation Project 58/58A was a series of 4 nuclear tests conducted by the United States in 1957–1958 at the Nevada Test Site. These tests followed the Operation Plumbbob series and preceded the Operation Hardtack I series.

All the tests in Project 58 were one-point safety tests. They were intended to freeze device designs prior to full-scale tests at Operation Hardtack I. No significant yield was expected from either, but the second, Coulomb-C, a surface test conducted on December 9, produced an unanticipated yield of 500 tons. Shortly after detonation, fallout readings of fifty roentgens per hour were recorded on the Mercury Highway, and, as the cloud moved toward the southwest, personnel at Jackass Flats involved in construction for future nuclear rocket testing were forced to take cover. Eventually, the cloud reached the Los Angeles area where readings caused public concern.

United States' Project 58+58A series tests and detonations
Name (Note: The US, France and Great Britain have code-named their test events, while the USSR and China did not, and therefore have only test numbers (with some exceptions – Soviet peaceful explosions were named). Word translations into English in parentheses unless the name is a proper noun. A dash followed by a number indicates a member of a salvo event. The US also sometimes named the individual explosions in such a salvo test, which results in "name1 – 1(with name2)". If test is canceled or aborted, then the row data like date and location discloses the intended plans, where known.)	Date time (UT)	Local time zone (Note: To convert the UT time into standard local, add the number of hours in parentheses to the UT time; for local daylight saving time, add one additional hour. If the result is earlier than 00:00, add 24 hours and subtract 1 from the day; if it is 24:00 or later, subtract 24 hours and add 1 to the day. All historical time zone data are derived from here:)	Location (Note: Rough place name and a latitude/longitude reference; for rocket-carried tests, the launch location is specified before the detonation location, if known. Some locations are extremely accurate; others (like airdrops and space blasts) may be quite inaccurate. "~" indicates a likely pro-forma rough location, shared with other tests in that same area.)	Elevation + height (Note: Elevation is the ground level at the point directly below the explosion relative to sea level; height is the additional distance added or subtracted by tower, balloon, shaft, tunnel, air drop or other contrivance. For rocket bursts the ground level is "N/A". In some cases it is not clear if the height is absolute or relative to ground, for example, Plumbbob/John. No number or units indicates the value is unknown, while "0" means zero. Sorting on this column is by elevation and height added together.)	Delivery (Note: Atmospheric, airdrop, balloon, gun, cruise missile, rocket, surface, tower, and barge are all disallowed by the Partial Nuclear Test Ban Treaty. Sealed shaft and tunnel are underground, and remained useful under the PTBT. Intentional cratering tests are borderline; they occurred under the treaty, were sometimes protested, and generally overlooked if the test was declared to be a peaceful use.) Purpose (Note: Include weapons development, weapon effects, safety test, transport safety test, war, science, joint verification and industrial/peaceful, which may be further broken down.)	Device (Note: Designations for test items where known, "?" indicates some uncertainty about the preceding value, nicknames for particular devices in quotes. This category of information is often not officially disclosed.)	Yield (Note: Estimated energy yield in tons, kilotons, and megatons. A ton of TNT equivalent is defined as 4.184 gigajoules (1 gigacalorie).)	Fallout (Note: Radioactive emission to the atmosphere aside from prompt neutrons, where known. The measured species is only iodine-131 if mentioned, otherwise it is all species. No entry means unknown, probably none if underground and "all" if not; otherwise notation for whether measured on the site only or off the site, where known, and the measured amount of radioactivity released.)	References	Notes
Pascal-C	December 6, 1957 20:15:00.0	PST (–8 hrs)	NTS Area U3e 37.04992°N 116.03159°W	1,202 m (3,944 ft)–80 m (260 ft)	underground shaft, safety experiment	XW-42 ?	10 t			One point safety test, partially successful (?).
Coulomb-C	December 9, 1957 20:00:??	PST (–8 hrs)	NTS Area S3i 37.0443°N 116.0305°W	1,225 m (4,019 ft) + 0	dry surface, safety experiment	Moccasin	500 t	I-131 venting detected, 69 kCi (2,600 TBq)		One point safety test, upper bound overtest. Similar to the Moccasin device fired in Hardtack II Hidalgo. Failure, 500 ton explosion.
Venus	February 22, 1958 01:00:00	PST (–8 hrs)	NTS Area U12d.01 37.19475°N 116.20068°W	2,104 m (6,903 ft)–30.48 m (100.0 ft)	tunnel, safety experiment	XW-47 primary ?	500 kg			One point safety test, partially successful (?). Similar to Hardtack II Oberon and Sanford devices.
Uranus	March 14, 1958 22:00:00	PST (–8 hrs)	NTS Area U12c.01 37.193397°N 116.20014°W	2,068 m (6,785 ft)–34.75 m (114.0 ft)	tunnel, safety experiment	XW-48	500 kg			One point safety test, partially successful (?). Similar to devices fired in Hardtack II Mars, Tamalpais, and Ceres.
