= Operation Plumbbob =

Series of 1950s American nuclear tests

- Plumbbob-Priscilla, 37 kilotons

Information
- Country: United States
- Test site: NTS Area 12, Rainier Mesa; NTS Areas 5, 11, Frenchman Flat; NTS, Areas 1–4, 6–10, Yucca Flat
- Period: 1957
- Number of tests: 29
- Test type: balloon, dry surface, high alt rocket (30–80 km), tower, underground shaft, tunnel
- Max. yield: 74 kilotonnes of TNT (310 TJ)

Test series chronology

Operation Plumbbob was a series of nuclear tests that were conducted between May 28 and October 7, 1957, at the Nevada Test Site, following Project 57, and preceding Project 58/58A.

== Background ==
The operation consisted of 29 explosions, of which only two did not produce any nuclear yield. Twenty-one laboratories and government agencies were involved. While most Operation Plumbbob tests contributed to the development of warheads for intercontinental and intermediate range missiles, they also tested air defense and anti-submarine warheads with smaller yields. They included 43 military effects tests on civil and military structures, radiation and bio-medical studies, and aircraft structural tests. Operation Plumbbob had the tallest tower tests to date in the U.S. nuclear testing program as well as high-altitude balloon tests. One nuclear test involved the largest troop maneuver ever associated with U.S. nuclear testing.

Approximately 18,000 members of the U.S. Air Force, Army, Navy and Marines participated in exercises Desert Rock VII and VIII during Operation Plumbbob. The military was interested in knowing how the average foot-soldier would stand up, physically and psychologically, to the rigors of the tactical nuclear battlefield.

Almost 1,200 pigs were subjected to bio-medical experiments and blast-effects studies during Operation Plumbbob. On shot Priscilla (37 kt), 719 pigs were used in various experiments on Frenchman Flat. Some pigs were placed in elevated cages and provided with suits made of different materials, to test which materials provided best protection from the thermal radiation. As shown and reported in the PBS documentary Dark Circle, the pigs survived, but with third-degree burns to 80% of their bodies. Other pigs were placed in pens behind large sheets of glass at measured distances from the hypocenter to test the effects of flying debris on living targets.

Operation Plumbob: Mission Fallout (1957) Official AEC information film reel.

Studies were conducted of radioactive contamination and fallout from a simulated accidental detonation of a weapon, and projects concerning earth motion, blast loading and neutron output were carried out.

Nuclear weapons safety experiments were conducted to study the possibility of a nuclear weapon detonation during an accident. On July 26, 1957, a safety experiment, Pascal-A, was detonated in an unstemmed hole at the Nevada Test Site, becoming the first underground shaft nuclear test. The knowledge gained provided data to predict nuclear yields in case of accidental detonations—for example, in a plane crash.

The John shot on July 19, 1957, was the only test of the Air Force's AIR-2A Genie rocket with a nuclear warhead. It was fired from an F-89J Scorpion fighter over Yucca Flats at the Nevada National Security Site. On the ground, the Air Force carried out a public relations event by having five Air Force officers and a motion picture photographer stand under ground zero of the blast, which took place at between 18,500 and 20,000 feet (5,600 and 6,100 m) altitude, with the idea of demonstrating the possibility of the use of the weapon over civilian populations without ill effects. The five officers were Colonel Sidney C. Bruce, later professor of Electrical Engineering at Colorado University, died in 2005; Lieutenant Colonel Frank P. Ball, died in 2003; Major John W. Hughes II, died in 1990; Major Norman B. Bodinger, died in 1997; Major Donald A. Luttrell, died in 2014. The videographer, Akira "George" Yoshitake, died in 2013.

Operation Plumbob: Weapons Development Report (1957) Official AEC information film reel.

The Rainier shot, conducted September 19, 1957, was the first fully contained underground nuclear test, meaning that no fission products were vented into the atmosphere. This test of 1.7 kt could be detected around the world by seismologists using ordinary seismic instruments. The Rainier test became the prototype for larger and more powerful underground tests.

Images from Upshot-Knothole Grable were accidentally relabeled as belonging to the Priscilla shot from Operation Plumbbob in 1957. As a consequence publications including official government documents have the photo mislabeled. The shots can be told apart by the trails of test rockets, which are prominently featured in images and footage of Grable, but appear almost completely absent at the actual Priscilla shot.

== Missing steel bore cap ==
In 1956, Robert Brownlee from Los Alamos National Laboratory in New Mexico was asked to examine whether nuclear detonations could be conducted underground. The first subterranean test was the nuclear device known as Pascal A in July 1957, which was lowered down a 500 ft (150 m) borehole. The detonated yield turned out to be 50,000 times greater than anticipated, creating a jet of fire that shot hundreds of meters into the sky.

For the Pascal-B nuclear test in August 1957, a 900-kilogram (2,000 lb) steel lid was welded over the borehole to contain the nuclear blast; Brownlee nonetheless questioned whether the lid would work. Upon detonation, the blast went straight up the test shaft and launched the cap into the atmosphere, where some speculated it became the first manmade object to enter Earth's orbit. The cap was never found.

In a conversation with Bill Ogle, Brownlee estimated its velocity as "six times the escape velocity from the Earth"—approximately 67.2 km/s (150,000 mph). Scientists believe compression heating caused the cap to vaporize as it sped through the atmosphere. A high-speed camera, which took one frame per millisecond, was focused on the borehole to study the velocity of the plate. After the detonation, the plate appeared in only one frame. Regarding its speed Brownlee reckoned that "a lower limit could be calculated by considering the time between frames (and I don't remember what that was)", and joked that the best estimate was it was "going like a bat!"

== List of tests ==
United States' Plumbbob series tests and detonations
Name	Date time (UT) (local: PST, −8 hrs) (Note: To convert the UT into standard local PST, subtract 8 hours. If the result is earlier than 00:00, add 24 hours and subtract 1 from the day. Historical time zone data are derived from "Time Zone Historical Database". iana.com. Archived from the original on March 11, 2014.)	Location (Note: Rough place name and a latitude/longitude reference; for rocket-carried tests, the launch location is specified before the detonation location, if known. Some locations are extremely accurate; others (like airdrops and space blasts) may be quite inaccurate. "~" indicates a likely pro-forma rough location, shared with other tests in that same area.)	Elevation + height (Note: Elevation is the ground level at the point directly below the explosion relative to sea level; height is the additional distance added or by tower, balloon, shaft, tunnel, air drop or other contrivance. For rocket bursts the ground level is "N/A". In some cases it is not clear if the height is absolute or relative to ground, for example, Plumbbob/John. No number or units indicates the value is unknown, while "0" means zero. Sorting on this column is by elevation and height added together.)	Delivery (Note: Atmospheric, airdrop, balloon, gun, cruise missile, rocket, surface, tower, and barge have all been disallowed by the Partial Nuclear Test Ban Treaty since 1963. Sealed shaft and tunnel are underground, and remained useful under the PTBT. Intentional cratering tests are borderline; they occurred under the treaty, were sometimes protested, and generally overlooked if the test was declared to be a peaceful use.) Purpose (Note: Include weapons development, weapon effects, safety test, transport safety test, war, science, joint verification and industrial/peaceful, which may be further broken down.)	Device (Note: Designations for test items where known, "?" indicates some uncertainty about the preceding value, nicknames for particular devices in quotes. This category of information is often not officially disclosed.)	Yield (Note: Estimated energy yield in tons or kilotons. A ton of TNT equivalent is defined as 4.184 gigajoules (1 gigacalorie).)	Fallout (Note: Radioactive emission to the atmosphere aside from prompt neutrons, where known. The measured species is only iodine 131 if mentioned, otherwise it is all species. No entry means unknown, probably none if underground and "all" if not; otherwise notation for whether measured on the site only or off the site, where known, and the measured amount of radioactivity released.)	References	Notes
Boltzmann	May 28, 1957 11:55:00.2	NTS Area 7c 37.0947°N 116.0245°W	1,294 m (4,245 ft) + 150 m (490 ft)	tower, weapons development	XW-40	12 kt	I-131 venting detected, 1.9 MCi (70 PBq)		XW-40 lightweight boosted fission warhead test.
Franklin	June 2, 1957 11:54:59.9	NTS Area T3 37.0477°N 116.022°W	1,229 m (4,032 ft) + 90 m (300 ft)	tower, weapons development	XW-30 ?	140 t	I-131 venting detected, 19 kCi (700 TBq)		XW-30 warhead test, fizzled. Retested successfully with Franklin Prime, with more fissile material in the core and different explosives.
Lassen	June 5, 1957 11:45:00.3	NTS Area B9a ~ 37.1347°N 116.0417°W	1,595 m (5,233 ft) + 150 m (490 ft)	balloon, weapons development		600 t	I-131 venting detected, 100 Ci (3,700 GBq)		Fizzle, unboosted all-oralloy small weapon design.
Wilson	June 18, 1957 11:45:00.3	NTS Area B9a ~ 37.1347°N 116.0417°W	1,589 m (5,213 ft) + 150 m (490 ft)	balloon, weapons development	XW-45X1	10 kt	I-131 venting detected, 1.5 MCi (56 PBq)		XW-45X1 Swan test, gas-boosted composite pit.
Priscilla	June 24, 1957 13:30:00.1	NTS Area 5 36.798°N 115.9298°W	940 m (3,080 ft) + 210 m (690 ft)	balloon, weapons development	Mk-15/39 primary	37 kt	I-131 venting detected, 5.8 MCi (210 PBq)		Effects shot with OTS weapon. Similar to that tested in Redwing Lacrosse.
Coulomb-A	July 1, 1957 17:30:??	NTS Area S3h 37.053°N 116.034°W	1,231 m (4,039 ft) + 0	dry surface, safety experiment	XW-31	no yield			Safety experiment, successful.
Hood	July 5, 1957 11:40:00.1	NTS Area B9a ~ 37.1347°N 116.0417°W	1,285 m (4,216 ft) + 460 m (1,510 ft)	balloon, weapons development	Swan primary and Whistle secondary. Full-scale test of device was Hardtack I Maple shot.	74 kt	I-131 venting detected, 11 MCi (410 PBq)		Largest atmospheric test in CONUS. Was a 2-stage thermonuclear device, even though AEC stated that no thermonuclear devices were being tested at the NTS. Desert Rock VII.
Diablo	July 15, 1957 11:30:00.1	NTS Area T2b 37.1502°N 116.1095°W	1,367 m (4,485 ft) + 150 m (490 ft)	tower, weapons development	Swan	17 kt	I-131 venting detected, 2.5 MCi (93 PBq)		Very similar to the Shasta test device. 2 stage. Misfired on 28 June.
John	July 19, 1957 14:00:04.6	Launch from NTS, Areas 1–4, 6–10, Yucca Flat: 10 37°N 116.0539°W, elv: 1,220 + 5,600 m (4,000 + 18,370 ft); Detonation over NTS 37.1605°N 116.0539°W	1,280 m (4,200 ft) + 5,639 m (18,501 ft)	Air launched rocket, weapon effect	W-25	2 kt	I-131 venting detected, 6.1MCi?		Proof test of AIR-2A Genie air-to-air rocket. Test made famous by five USAF officers and a videographer standing at ground zero below the hypocentre and during the detonation, flash and blast.
Kepler	July 24, 1957 11:49:59.9	NTS Area 4 37.09549°N 116.10354°W	1,318 m (4,324 ft) + 150 m (490 ft)	tower, weapons development	XW-35 primary?	10 kt	I-131 venting detected, 1.7 MCi (63 PBq)		ICBM warhead, similar to Hardtack I/Koa.
Owens	July 25, 1957 13:29:59.7	NTS Area B9b ~ 37.1347°N 116.0417°W	1,260 m (4,130 ft) + 150 m (490 ft)	balloon, weapons development	XW-51 ?	9.7 kt	I-131 venting detected, 1.7 MCi (63 PBq)		Very small boosted plutonium device, XW-51 progenitor.
Pascal-A	July 26, 1957 08:00:00.0	NTS Area U3j 37.05175°N 116.03415°W	1,202 m (3,944 ft)–150 m (490 ft)	underground shaft, safety experiment		55 t	I-131 venting detected, 10 kCi (370 TBq)		Originally Galileo A. One-point safety experiment, failure. Expected yield was less than 1 kg. A concrete cylinder perhaps 2 m (6 ft 7 in) thick 100 m (330 ft) up the tube disappeared.
Stokes	August 7, 1957 12:25:00.2	NTS Area B7b ~ 37.0866°N 116.0245°W	1,250 m (4,100 ft) + 460 m (1,510 ft)	balloon, weapons development	XW-30	19 kt	I-131 venting detected, 2.8 MCi (100 PBq)		Tactical Atomic Demolition Munition (TADM) and Talos SAM warhead.
Saturn	August 10, 1957 00:59:55.1	NTS Area U12c.02 37.19355°N 116.20059°W	1,231 m (4,039 ft)–39.01 m (128.0 ft)	tunnel, safety experiment	XW-45X1	50 kg			One-point safety experiment; first shot in a Rainier tunnel.
Shasta	August 18, 1957 12:00:00.0	NTS Area 2a 37.128°N 116.1073°W	1,339 m (4,393 ft) + 150 m (490 ft)	tower, weapons development	Swan	17 kt	I-131 venting detected, 2.5 MCi (93 PBq)		2 stage thermonuclear design.
Doppler	August 23, 1957 12:30:00.1	NTS Area B7b ~ 37.0866°N 116.0245°W	1,282 m (4,206 ft) + 460 m (1,510 ft)	balloon, weapons development	XW-34 ?	11 kt	I-131 venting detected, 1.7 MCi (63 PBq)		LASL gas boosted implosion device, possible XW-34 test.
Pascal-B	August 27, 1957 22:35:00.0	NTS Area U3d 37.04903°N 116.0347°W	1,229 m (4,032 ft)–150 m (490 ft)	underground shaft, safety experiment		300 t			Shaft safety experiment, failed. Sent the shaft cap weighing several hundred pounds (1 ton) at velocity very roughly pre-calculated as 66 km/s (41 mi/s); popular claims of it reaching space are disputed, see section above.
Franklin Prime	August 30, 1957 12:39:59.9	NTS Area B7b ~ 37.0866°N 116.0245°W	1,282 m (4,206 ft) + 230 m (750 ft)	balloon, weapons development		4.7 kt	I-131 venting detected, 690 kCi (26,000 TBq)		Retest of Franklin with more U-235.
Smoky	August 31, 1957 12:30:00.0	NTS Area T2c 37.18712°N 116.06887°W	1,367 m (4,485 ft) + 210 m (690 ft)	tower, weapons development	TX-41 primary	44 kt	I-131 venting detected, 6.4 MCi (240 PBq)		2 stages of 3 stage thermonuke, similar to Redwing/Zuni and Tewa. Desert Rock VII; 3000 servicemen irradiated; 10 of 4 expected leukemia cases in the 80s. Last pristine air-drop location at the NTS.
Galileo	September 2, 1957 12:40:00.0	NTS Area T1 37.053°N 116.1034°W	1,294 m (4,245 ft) + 150 m (490 ft)	tower, weapons development		11 kt	I-131 venting detected, 1.9 MCi (70 PBq)		LASL diagnostic/exploratory test of boosted fission device. Desert Rock VIII.
Wheeler	September 6, 1957 12:45:00.0	NTS Area B9a ~ 37.1347°N 116.0417°W	1,286 m (4,219 ft) + 150 m (490 ft)	balloon, weapons development	XW-51 ?	197 t	I-131 venting detected, 27 kCi (1,000 TBq)		Retest of redesigned Lassen device, possible XW-51 air-to-air warhead progenitor.
Coulomb-B	September 6, 1957 20:05:00.6	NTS Area S3g 37.0427°N 116.0277°W	1,225 m (4,019 ft) + 0	dry surface, safety experiment	XW-31	300 t	I-131 venting detected, 42 kCi (1,600 TBq)		One-point safety experiment, high limits test, expected 1 kg TNT equivalent, max .2 kt - failure.
Laplace	September 8, 1957 12:59:59.8	NTS Area B7b ~ 37.0866°N 116.0245°W	1,282 m (4,206 ft) + 230 m (750 ft)	balloon, weapons development	XW-33 "Fleegle"	1 kt	I-131 venting detected, 140 kCi (5,200 TBq)		Oralloy gun-type device, for a nuclear artillery shell. The third of only four gun-type weapons, with Little Boy, Grable and Aardvark.
Fizeau	September 14, 1957 16:44:59.8	NTS Area T3b 37.0336°N 116.0323°W	1,220 m (4,000 ft) + 150 m (490 ft)	tower, weapons development	XW-34 ?	11 kt	I-131 venting detected, 1.7 MCi (63 PBq)		LASL boosted fission device. Possibly a test of the XW-34 depth bomb.
Newton	September 16, 1957 12:49:59.9	NTS Area B7a ~ 37.0866°N 116.0245°W	1,282 m (4,206 ft) + 460 m (1,510 ft)	balloon, weapons development	XW-31	12 kt	I-131 venting detected, 2.1 MCi (78 PBq)		LASL test of XW-31 variant, boosted primary in thermonuclear system mockup. Sounds like a fizzle, but no one says so.
Rainier	September 19, 1957 16:59:59.45	NTS Area U12b 37.19573°N 116.20404°W	2,295 m (7,530 ft)–272.8 m (895 ft)	tunnel, weapons development	W-25	1.7 kt			First US underground nuclear test. Evaluate containment and detection of underground testing, formed a chimney of broken rock which provided data on possible underground engineering applications of nuclear explosives.
Whitney	September 23, 1957 12:29:59.8	NTS Area T2 37.1383°N 116.1184°W	1,370 m (4,490 ft) + 150 m (490 ft)	tower, weapons development	W27 primary	19 kt	I-131 venting detected, 2.9 MCi (110 PBq)		Test of boosted Swan primary in W-27 thermonuclear system mockup.
Charleston	September 28, 1957 12:59:59.9	NTS Area B9a ~ 37.1347°N 116.0417°W	1,285 m (4,216 ft) + 460 m (1,510 ft)	balloon, weapons development		12 kt	I-131 venting detected, 1.8 MCi (67 PBq)		UCRL test of a small "clean" tactical 2-stage thermonuclear device. Device fizzled when second stage failed to fire.
Morgan	October 7, 1957 13:00:00.1	NTS Area B9a ~ 37.1347°N 116.0417°W	1,285 m (4,216 ft) + 150 m (490 ft)	balloon, weapons development	XW-45X1 Swan/Flamingo	8 kt	I-131 venting detected, 1.2 MCi (44 PBq)		

== Gallery ==
Plumbbob-Hood, 74-kilotons

Plumbbob-Fizeau, 11-kilotons

Plumbbob-Galileo, 11-kilotons

Plumbbob-Coulomb-B

Plumbbob-Rainier, 1.7-kilotons

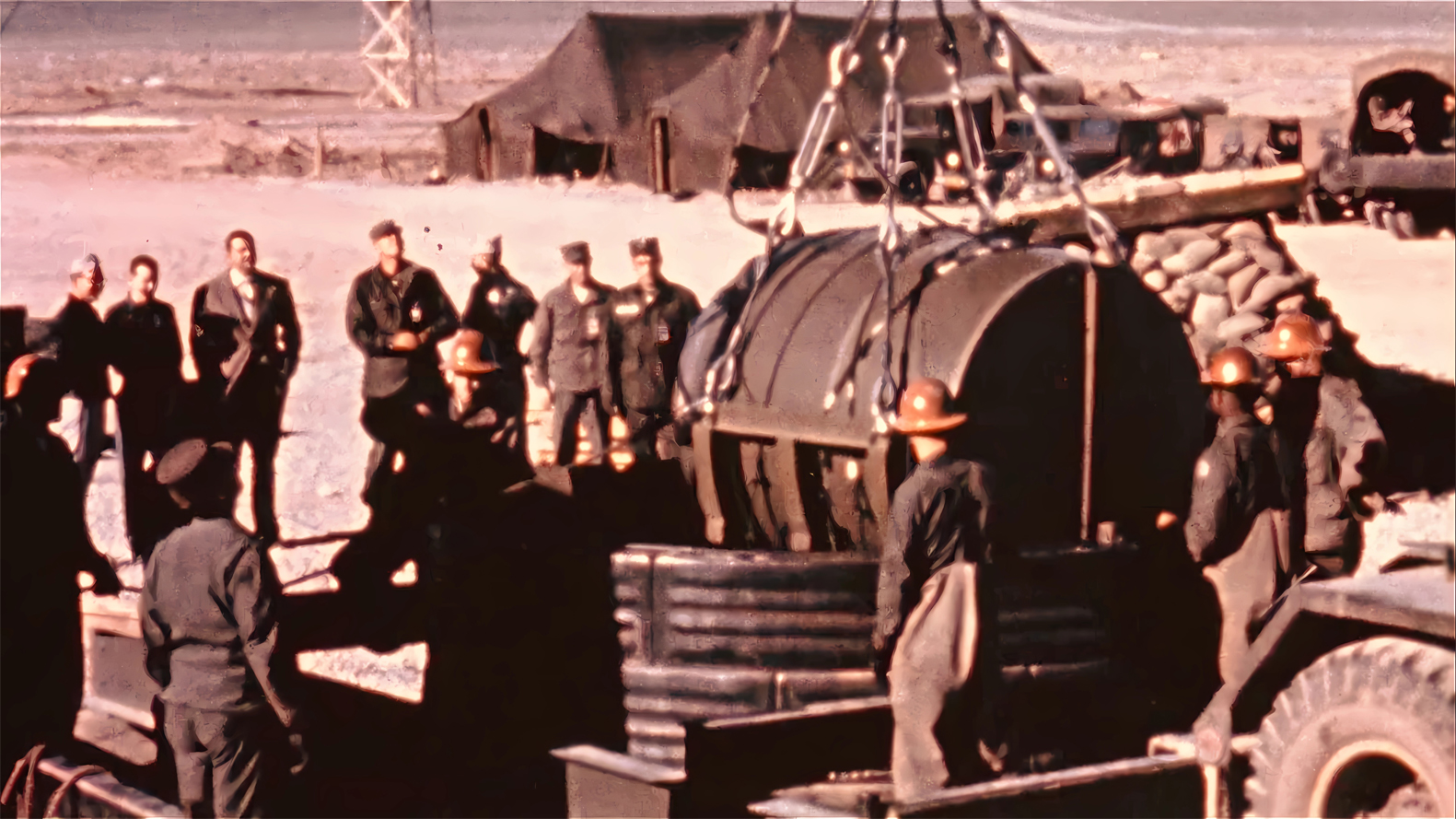
Plumbbob-Rainier device

Plumbbob-John, 2-kilotons

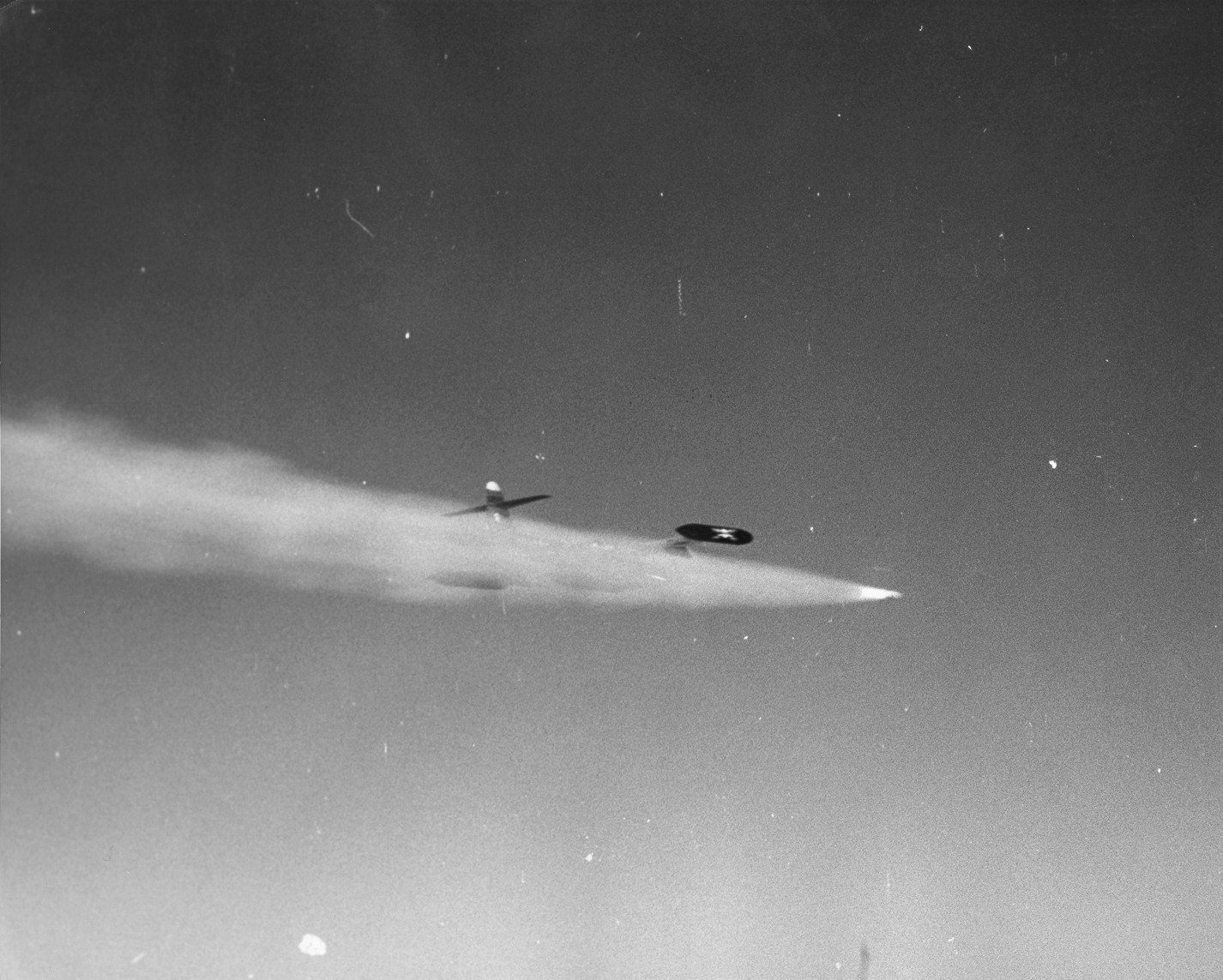
Plumbbob-John launch, via F-89

== See also ==
- Lists of nuclear disasters and radioactive incidents
- Totskoye nuclear exercise
