= Operation Grenadier =

Series of 1980s US nuclear tests

Grenadier

Information
- Country: United States
- Test site: NTS Area 12, Rainier Mesa; NTS Area 19, 20, Pahute Mesa; NTS, Areas 1–4, 6–10, Yucca Flat
- Period: 1984–1985
- Number of tests: 16
- Test type: underground shaft, tunnel
- Max. yield: 150 kilotonnes of TNT (630 TJ)

Test series chronology

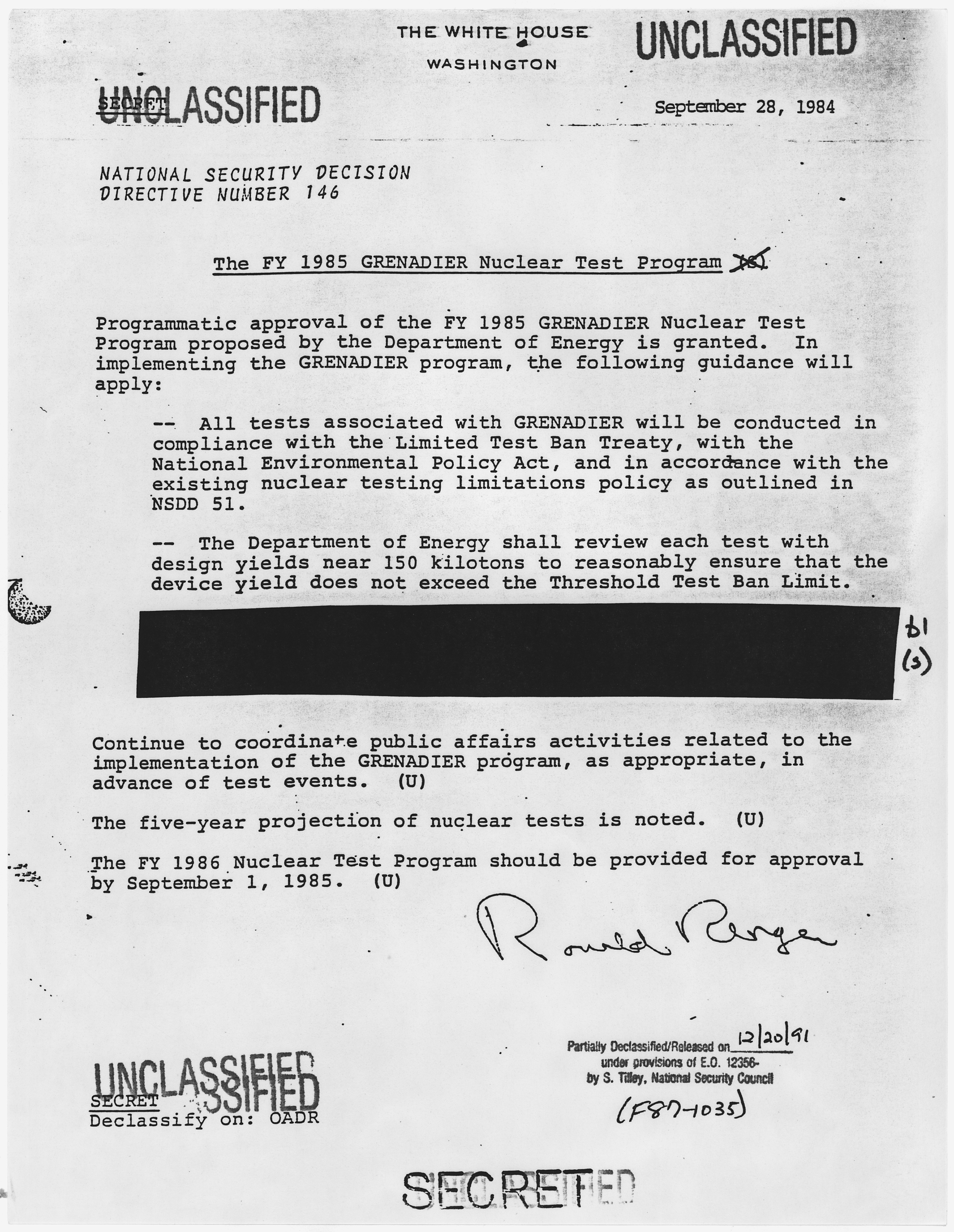
The FY 1985 GRENADIER Nuclear Test Program signed by Ronald Reagan

Operation Grenadier was a series of 16 nuclear tests conducted by the United States in 1984–1985 at the Nevada Test Site. These tests followed the Operation Fusileer series and preceded the Operation Charioteer series.

United States' Grenadier series tests and detonations
Name (Note: The US, France and Great Britain have code-named their test events, while the USSR and China did not, and therefore have only test numbers (with some exceptions – Soviet peaceful explosions were named). Word translations into English in parentheses unless the name is a proper noun. A dash followed by a number indicates a member of a salvo event. The US also sometimes named the individual explosions in such a salvo test, which results in "name1 – 1(with name2)". If test is canceled or aborted, then the row data like date and location discloses the intended plans, where known.)	Date time (UT)	Local time zone (Note: To convert the UT time into standard local, add the number of hours in parentheses to the UT time; for local daylight saving time, add one additional hour. If the result is earlier than 00:00, add 24 hours and subtract 1 from the day; if it is 24:00 or later, subtract 24 hours and add 1 to the day. Historical time zone data obtained from the IANA time zone database.)	Location (Note: Rough place name and a latitude/longitude reference; for rocket-carried tests, the launch location is specified before the detonation location, if known. Some locations are extremely accurate; others (like airdrops and space blasts) may be quite inaccurate. "~" indicates a likely pro-forma rough location, shared with other tests in that same area.)	Elevation + height (Note: Elevation is the ground level at the point directly below the explosion relative to sea level; height is the additional distance added or subtracted by tower, balloon, shaft, tunnel, air drop or other contrivance. For rocket bursts the ground level is "N/A". In some cases it is not clear if the height is absolute or relative to ground, for example, Plumbbob/John. No number or units indicates the value is unknown, while "0" means zero. Sorting on this column is by elevation and height added together.)	Delivery (Note: Atmospheric, airdrop, balloon, gun, cruise missile, rocket, surface, tower, and barge are all disallowed by the Partial Nuclear Test Ban Treaty. Sealed shaft and tunnel are underground, and remained useful under the PTBT. Intentional cratering tests are borderline; they occurred under the treaty, were sometimes protested, and generally overlooked if the test was declared to be a peaceful use.) Purpose (Note: Include weapons development, weapon effects, safety test, transport safety test, war, science, joint verification and industrial/peaceful, which may be further broken down.)	Device (Note: Designations for test items where known, "?" indicates some uncertainty about the preceding value, nicknames for particular devices in quotes. This category of information is often not officially disclosed.)	Yield (Note: Estimated energy yield in tons, kilotons, and megatons. A ton of TNT equivalent is defined as 4.184 gigajoules (1 gigacalorie).)	Fallout (Note: Radioactive emission to the atmosphere aside from prompt neutrons, where known. The measured species is only iodine-131 if mentioned, otherwise it is all species. No entry means unknown, probably none if underground and "all" if not; otherwise notation for whether measured on the site only or off the site, where known, and the measured amount of radioactivity released.)	References	Notes
Vermejo	October 2, 1984 18:14:00.103	PST (–8 hrs)	NTS Area U4r 37.08516°N 116.0537°W	1,229 m (4,032 ft) – 350.22 m (1,149.0 ft)	underground shaft, weapons development		2.5 kt			
Villita	November 10, 1984 16:40:00.09	PST (–8 hrs)	NTS Area U3ld 37.00003°N 116.01816°W	1,177 m (3,862 ft) – 372.2 m (1,221 ft)	underground shaft, weapons development		5 kt			
Tierra	December 15, 1984 14:45:00.0	PST (–8 hrs)	NTS Area U19ac 37.28131°N 116.30629°W	2,118 m (6,949 ft) – 640 m (2,100 ft)	underground shaft, weapons development	B83	80 kt	Venting detected, 600 Ci (22,000 GBq)		B83 proof test
Minero	December 20, 1984 16:20:00.11	PST (–8 hrs)	NTS Area U3lt 37.01192°N 116.04565°W	1,187 m (3,894 ft) – 244.8 m (803 ft)	underground shaft, weapons development		2.5 kt			
Vaughn	March 15, 1985 16:31:00.1	PST (–8 hrs)	NTS Area U3lr 37.0581°N 116.0461°W	1,211 m (3,973 ft) – 425.5 m (1,396 ft)	underground shaft, weapons development		20 kt	Venting detected, 100 Ci (3,700 GBq)		
Cottage	March 23, 1985 18:30:00.082	PST (–8 hrs)	NTS Area U8j 37.17993°N 116.08983°W	1,362 m (4,469 ft) – 515 m (1,690 ft)	underground shaft, weapons development		60 kt			
Hermosa	April 2, 1985 20:00:00.09	PST (–8 hrs)	NTS Area U7bs 37.09476°N 116.03289°W	1,251 m (4,104 ft) – 638.25 m (2,094.0 ft)	underground shaft, weapons development		150 kt			The Soviet Union alleged that this test violated the Threshold Test Ban Treaty.
Misty Rain	April 6, 1985 23:15:00.09	PST (–8 hrs)	NTS Area U12n.17 37.20078°N 116.20805°W	2,212 m (7,257 ft) – 388.6 m (1,275 ft)	tunnel, weapon effect		15 kt	Venting detected off site, 63 Ci (2,300 GBq)		
Towanda	May 2, 1985 15:20:00.083	PST (–8 hrs)	NTS Area U19ab 37.25335°N 116.32609°W	2,085 m (6,841 ft) – 660.2 m (2,166 ft)	underground shaft, weapons development		150 kt			
Salut	June 12, 1985 15:15:00.082	PST (–8 hrs)	NTS Area U20ak 37.2478°N 116.48995°W	1,873 m (6,145 ft) – 608.08 m (1,995.0 ft)	underground shaft, weapons development		100 kt	Venting detected, 4 Ci (150 GBq)		
Ville	June 12, 1985 17:30:00.088	PST (–8 hrs)	NTS Area U4am 37.08832°N 116.0849°W	1,250 m (4,100 ft) – 293.2 m (962 ft)	underground shaft, weapons development		8 kt	Venting detected, 0.1 Ci (3.7 GBq)		
Maribo	June 26, 1985 18:03:00.08	PST (–8 hrs)	NTS Area U2cs 37.12372°N 116.12201°W	1,352 m (4,436 ft) – 381 m (1,250 ft)	underground shaft, weapons development		3.5 kt	Venting detected, 4 Ci (150 GBq)		
Serena	July 25, 1985 14:00:00.088	PST (–8 hrs)	NTS Area U20an 37.2972°N 116.43896°W	1,942 m (6,371 ft) – 597 m (1,959 ft)	underground shaft, weapons development		45 kt	Venting detected, 3 Ci (110 GBq)		
Cebrero	August 14, 1985 13:00:00.082	PST (–8 hrs)	NTS Area U9cw 37.11103°N 116.01525°W	1,316 m (4,318 ft) – 183 m (600 ft)	underground shaft, weapons development		less than 20 kt	Venting detected		
Chamita	August 17, 1985 16:25:00.09	PST (–8 hrs)	NTS Area U3lz 37.00227°N 116.04402°W	1,181 m (3,875 ft) – 331.62 m (1,088.0 ft)	underground shaft, weapons development		8 kt			
Ponil	September 27, 1985 14:15:00.08	PST (–8 hrs)	NTS Area U7bv 37.08976°N 116.00264°W	1,284 m (4,213 ft) – 364.8 m (1,197 ft)	underground shaft, weapons development		10 kt			
