= Operation Fusileer =

Series of 1980s US nuclear tests

Fusileer

Information
- Country: United States
- Test site: NTS Area 12, Rainier Mesa; NTS Area 19, 20, Pahute Mesa; NTS, Areas 1–4, 6–10, Yucca Flat
- Period: 1983–1984
- Number of tests: 16
- Test type: underground shaft, tunnel
- Max. yield: 150 kilotonnes of TNT (630 TJ)

Test series chronology

Operation Fusileer was a series of 16 nuclear tests conducted by the United States in 1983–1984 at the Nevada Test Site. These tests followed the Operation Phalanx series and preceded the Operation Grenadier series.

United States' Fusileer series tests and detonations
Name (Note: The US, France and Great Britain have code-named their test events, while the USSR and China did not, and therefore have only test numbers (with some exceptions – Soviet peaceful explosions were named). Word translations into English in parentheses unless the name is a proper noun. A dash followed by a number indicates a member of a salvo event. The US also sometimes named the individual explosions in such a salvo test, which results in "name1 – 1(with name2)". If test is canceled or aborted, then the row data like date and location discloses the intended plans, where known.)	Date time (UT)	Local time zone (Note: To convert the UT time into standard local, add the number of hours in parentheses to the UT time; for local daylight saving time, add one additional hour. If the result is earlier than 00:00, add 24 hours and subtract 1 from the day; if it is 24:00 or later, subtract 24 hours and add 1 to the day. Historical time zone data obtained from the IANA time zone database.)	Location (Note: Rough place name and a latitude/longitude reference; for rocket-carried tests, the launch location is specified before the detonation location, if known. Some locations are extremely accurate; others (like airdrops and space blasts) may be quite inaccurate. "~" indicates a likely pro-forma rough location, shared with other tests in that same area.)	Elevation + height (Note: Elevation is the ground level at the point directly below the explosion relative to sea level; height is the additional distance added or subtracted by tower, balloon, shaft, tunnel, air drop or other contrivance. For rocket bursts the ground level is "N/A". In some cases it is not clear if the height is absolute or relative to ground, for example, Plumbbob/John. No number or units indicates the value is unknown, while "0" means zero. Sorting on this column is by elevation and height added together.)	Delivery (Note: Atmospheric, airdrop, balloon, gun, cruise missile, rocket, surface, tower, and barge are all disallowed by the Partial Nuclear Test Ban Treaty. Sealed shaft and tunnel are underground, and remained useful under the PTBT. Intentional cratering tests are borderline; they occurred under the treaty, were sometimes protested, and generally overlooked if the test was declared to be a peaceful use.) Purpose (Note: Include weapons development, weapon effects, safety test, transport safety test, war, science, joint verification and industrial/peaceful, which may be further broken down.)	Device (Note: Designations for test items where known, "?" indicates some uncertainty about the preceding value, nicknames for particular devices in quotes. This category of information is often not officially disclosed.)	Yield (Note: Estimated energy yield in tons, kilotons, and megatons. A ton of TNT equivalent is defined as 4.184 gigajoules (1 gigacalorie).)	Fallout (Note: Radioactive emission to the atmosphere aside from prompt neutrons, where known. The measured species is only iodine-131 if mentioned, otherwise it is all species. No entry means unknown, probably none if underground and "all" if not; otherwise notation for whether measured on the site only or off the site, where known, and the measured amount of radioactivity released.)	References	Notes
Muggins	December 9, 1983 16:00:00.11	PST (–8 hrs)	NTS Area U3ls 37.01274°N 116.04643°W	1,188 m (3,898 ft) – 243.84 m (800.0 ft)	underground shaft, weapons development		1.5 kt			
Romano	December 16, 1983 18:30:00.09	PST (–8 hrs)	NTS Area U2ex 37.1404°N 116.07294°W	1,287 m (4,222 ft) – 515 m (1,690 ft)	underground shaft, weapons development		29 kt	I-131 venting detected, 0		
Gorbea	January 31, 1984 15:30:00.085	PST (–8 hrs)	NTS Area U2cq 37.11334°N 116.12229°W	1,344 m (4,409 ft) – 388 m (1,273 ft)	underground shaft, weapons development		20 kt	Venting detected, 12 Ci (440 GBq)		
Midas Myth/Milagro	February 15, 1984 17:00:00.11	PST (–8 hrs)	NTS Area U12t.04 37.22135°N 116.181572°W	2,044 m (6,706 ft) – 360.9 m (1,184 ft)	tunnel, weapon effect		20 kt			14 injured, 1 died in unexpected crater collapse following test; the only fatality from testing at NTS. Unlike other tunnel tests, Milagro required high speed video links, so a data trailer park was built above it.
Tortugas	March 1, 1984 17:45:00.09	PST (–8 hrs)	NTS Area U3gg 37.06572°N 116.04716°W	1,216 m (3,990 ft) – 638.6 m (2,095 ft)	underground shaft, weapons development		150 kt			
Agrini	March 31, 1984 14:30:00.084	PST (–8 hrs)	NTS Area U2ev 37.14648°N 116.08512°W	1,304 m (4,278 ft) – 320 m (1,050 ft)	underground shaft, weapons development		6 kt	Venting detected on site, 690 Ci (26,000 GBq)		
Orkney	May 2, 1984 13:50:00.09	PST (–8 hrs)	NTS Area U10be 37.19843°N 116.05484°W	1,351 m (4,432 ft) – 210 m (690 ft)	underground shaft, weapons development		250 t	Venting detected, 0.5 Ci (19 GBq)		
Bellow	May 16, 1984 16:00:00.085	PST (–8 hrs)	NTS Area U4ac 37.09244°N 116.09412°W	1,266 m (4,154 ft) – 207.3 m (680 ft)	underground shaft, weapons development		800 t			
Caprock	May 31, 1984 13:04:00.102	PST (–8 hrs)	NTS Area U4q 37.10333°N 116.04967°W	1,237 m (4,058 ft) – 599.85 m (1,968.0 ft)	underground shaft, weapons development		120 kt	Venting detected, 0.1 Ci (3.7 GBq)		
Duoro	June 20, 1984 15:15:00.088	PST (–8 hrs)	NTS Area U3lv 37.00042°N 116.04399°W	1,180 m (3,870 ft) – 379.78 m (1,246.0 ft)	underground shaft, weapons development		20 kt			
Normanna	July 12, 1984 14:00:00.087	PST (–8 hrs)	NTS Area U10cb 37.19194°N 116.03525°W	1,315 m (4,314 ft) – 200 m (660 ft)	underground shaft, weapons development		500 t			
Kappeli	July 25, 1984 15:30:00.084	PST (–8 hrs)	NTS Area U20am 37.26771°N 116.41153°W	1,982 m (6,503 ft) – 640 m (2,100 ft)	underground shaft, weapons development		80 kt	Venting detected, 12 Ci (440 GBq)		
Correo	August 2, 1984 15:00:00.09	PST (–8 hrs)	NTS Area U3lw 37.01681°N 116.00853°W	1,182 m (3,878 ft) – 334.1 m (1,096 ft)	underground shaft, weapons development	W84	10 kt			
Dolcetto	August 30, 1984 14:45:00.102	PST (–8 hrs)	NTS Area U7bi 37.08975°N 116.00023°W	1,291 m (4,236 ft) – 365.15 m (1,198.0 ft)	underground shaft, weapons development		20 kt			
Wexford	August 30, 1984 14:45:00.0	PST (–8 hrs)	NTS Area U2cr 37.14386°N 116.12615°W	1,376 m (4,514 ft) – 314 m (1,030 ft)	underground shaft, weapons development		less than 20 kt			
Breton	September 13, 1984 14:00:00.0	PST (–8 hrs)	NTS Area U4ar 37.08639°N 116.0724°W	1,238 m (4,062 ft) – 483.11 m (1,585.0 ft)	underground shaft, weapons development		33 kt	Venting detected, 4 Ci (150 GBq)		
