= Operation Teapot =

Series of 1950s US nuclear tests

- Teapot-MET (Military Effects Test), 22-kilotons

Information
- Country: United States
- Test site: NTS Areas 5, 11, Frenchman Flat; NTS, Areas 1–4, 6–10, Yucca Flat
- Period: 1955
- Number of tests: 14
- Test type: cratering, free air drop, parachuted, tower
- Max. yield: 43 kilotonnes of TNT (180 TJ)

Test series chronology

Operation Teapot was a series of 14 nuclear test explosions conducted at the Nevada Test Site in the first half of 1955. It was preceded by Operation Castle, and followed by Operation Wigwam. Wigwam was, administratively, a part of Teapot, but it is usually treated as a class of its own. The aims of the operation were to establish military tactics for ground forces on a nuclear battlefield and to improve the nuclear weapons used for strategic delivery.

== Individual blasts ==
=== Wasp ===
During shot Wasp, ground forces took part in Exercise Desert Rock VI which included an armored task force Razor moving to within 900 metres (3,000 ft) of ground zero, under the still-forming mushroom cloud.

=== Bee ===
An augmented test unit from the United States Marine Corps participated in shot Bee during the March 1955 exercises.

=== MET ===
The MET was the first bomb core to include uranium-233 (a rarely used fissile isotope that is the product of thorium-232 neutron absorption), along with plutonium; this was based on the plutonium/U-235 pit from the TX-7E, a prototype Mark 7 nuclear bomb design used in the 1951 Operation Buster-Jangle Easy test. It produced a yield of 22kt (comparable to the Fat Man plutonium-only weapon that exploded over Nagasaki), but significantly less than the expected amount. Since it was a military effects test, the DoD specified that the device should have a calibrated yield within 10% of ratings. However, weapon designers at Los Alamos substituted the experimental core without notifying the DoD. The unexpected lower yield, 33% less than the DoD expected, ruined many of the military's tests.

=== Apple-2 ===
The Civil Defense Apple-2 shot on May 5, 1955 was intended to test various building construction types in a nuclear blast. An assortment of buildings, including residential houses and electrical substations, were constructed at the site nicknamed "Survival Town" by some and "Doom Town" by others. The buildings were populated with mannequins, and stocked with different types of canned and packaged foods. Not all of the buildings were destroyed in the blast, and some of them still stand at Area 1, Nevada Test Site. A short film about the blast, referred to as "Operation Cue", was distributed by the Federal Civil Defense Administration. The houses are still standing at 37.04476°N 116.07416°W, at the east and west ends of the road loop. They are stops on the Nevada National Security Site (NNSS) tour.

From declassified documents dated February to May 1956, the Apple-2 shot, as part of Operation Teapot Project 35.5 "Effects of Nuclear Explosion on Records and Records Storage Equipment" was staged on the Nevada Test Site to determine the effects of nuclear explosions on various types of records and record storage equipment.

== Teapot series tests ==
United States' Teapot series tests and detonations
| Name (Note: The US, France and Great Britain have code-named their test events, while the USSR and China have not, and therefore have only test numbers (with some exceptions - Soviet peaceful explosions were named). Word translations into English in parentheses unless the name is a proper noun. A dash followed by a number indicates a member of a salvo event. The US also sometimes named the individual explosions in such a salvo test, which results in "name1 - 1(with name2)". If test is canceled or aborted, then the row data like date and location discloses the intended plans, where known.) | Date time (UT) | Local time zone (Note: To convert the UT time into standard local, add the number of hours in parentheses to the UT time; for local daylight saving time, add one additional hour. If the result is earlier than 00:00, add 24 hours and subtract 1 from the day; if it's 24:00 or later, subtract 24 hours and add 1 to the day.) | Location (Note: Rough place name and a Latitude/Longitude reference; for rocket-carried tests, the launch location is specified before the detonation location, if known. Some locations are extremely accurate; others (like airdrops and space blasts) may be quite inaccurate. "~" indicates a likely pro-forma rough location, shared with other tests in that same area.) | Elevation + height (Note: Elevation is the ground level at the point directly below the explosion relative to sea level; height is the additional distance added or subtracted by tower, balloon, shaft, tunnel, air drop or other contrivance. For rocket bursts the ground level is "N/A". In some cases it is not clear if the height is absolute or relative to ground, for example, Plumbbob/John. No number or units indicates the value is unknown, while "0" means zero. Sorting on this column is by elevation and height added together.) | Delivery (Note: Atmospheric, airdrop, balloon, gun, cruise missile, rocket, surface, tower, and barge are all disallowed by the Partial Nuclear Test Ban Treaty. Sealed shaft and tunnel are underground, and remained useful under the PTBT. Intentional cratering tests are borderline; they occurred under the treaty, were sometimes protested, and generally overlooked if the test was declared to be a peaceful use.) | Purpose (Note: Include weapons development, weapon effects, safety test, transport safety test, war, science, joint verification and industrial/peaceful, which may be further broken down.) | Device (Note: Designations for test items where known, "?" indicates some uncertainty about the preceding value, nicknames for particular devices in quotes. This category of information is often not officially disclosed.) | Yield (Note: Estimated energy yield in tonnes, kilotonnes, and megatonnes (all metric units).) | Venting (Note: Emissions to atmosphere, where known. The measured species is only iodine-131 if mentioned, otherwise it is all species. No entry means unknown, probably none if underground and everything if not; otherwise notation for whether measured on the site only or off the site, where known, and the measured amount of radioactivity released.) | References | Notes |
|---|---|---|---|---|---|---|---|---|---|---|---|
| Wasp | February 18, 1955 19:59:59.2 | PST (−8 h) | NTS Area 7 37.0866°N 116.0228°W | 1,268 m (4,160 ft) + 230 m (750 ft) | free air drop | weapons development | | 1 kt | I-131 venting detected, 160 kCi (5,900 TBq) | | Air defense test. Light weight implosion system, 120 lb (54 kg) and 22 in (560 mm) across. Yield below predictions. Desert Rock VI. |
| Moth | February 22, 1955 13:00:45.0 | PST (−8 h) | NTS Area 3 37.0477°N 116.022°W | 1,230 m (4,040 ft) + 90 m (300 ft) | tower | weapons development | XW-30 ? | 2 kt | I-131 venting detected, 320 kCi (12,000 TBq) | | Proof test of XW30 air defense warhead. Used an ENS (external neutron source) 'Zipper' initiator. Desert Rock VI. |
| Tesla | March 1, 1955 13:00:30.3 | PST (−8 h) | NTS Area 9b 37.1255°N 116.0484°W | 1,282 m (4,206 ft) + 90 m (300 ft) | tower | weapons development | Cleo I | 7 kt | I-131 venting detected, 1.2 MCi (44 PBq) | | First successful UCRL test; used linear implosion, ZIPPER initiator. Desert Rock VI. |
| Turk | March 7, 1955 13:00:20.2 | PST (−8 h) | NTS Area 2 37.1383°N 116.1184°W | 1,370 m (4,490 ft) + 150 m (490 ft) | tower | weapons development | XW-27D "Linda" lightweight secondary | 43 kt | I-131 venting detected, 6.4 MCi (240 PBq) | | Test of primary for XW-27 class D, lightweight thermonuke, in an XW-27 mockup. Desert Rock VI. |
| Hornet | March 12, 1955 13:19:59.8 | PST (−8 h) | NTS Area 3a 37.0402°N 116.0261°W | 1,224 m (4,016 ft) + 90 m (300 ft) | tower | weapons development | XW-30 ? | 4 kt | I-131 venting detected, 620 kCi (23,000 TBq) | | Boosted XW-30. A sealed pit D-T gas boost design, with ZIPPER initiator. |
| Bee | March 22, 1955 13:04:59.9 | PST (−8 h) | NTS Area 7 37.0947°N 116.0248°W | 1,294 m (4,245 ft) + 150 m (490 ft) | tower | weapons development | XW-25 ? | 8 kt | I-131 venting detected, 1.2 MCi (44 PBq) | | LASL sealed pit D-T gas boosted design, with ZIPPER initiator. Desert Rock VI. |
| ESS | March 23, 1955 20:00:30.0 | PST (−8 h) | NTS Area 10 37.1683°N 116.0448°W | 1,298 m (4,259 ft) - 20 m (66 ft) | cratering | weapon effect | Mk-6 HE | 1 kt | I-131 venting detected, 140 kCi (5,200 TBq) | | "Effects Sub-surface". Test for ADM (Atomic Demolition Munition). Desert Rock VI. |
| Apple-1 | March 29, 1955 12:00:55.1 | PST (−8 h) | NTS Area 4 37.0955°N 116.1037°W | 1,317 m (4,321 ft) + 150 m (490 ft) | tower | weapons development | | 14 kt | I-131 venting detected, 2 MCi (74 PBq) | | Primary failed; expected 40 kt. Desert Rock VI. |
| Wasp Prime | March 29, 1955 17:59:54.8 | PST (−8 h) | NTS Area 7 37.0866°N 116.0586°W | 1,261 m (4,137 ft) + 230 m (750 ft) | free air drop | weapons development | | 3.2 kt | I-131 venting detected, 450 kCi (17,000 TBq) | | Repeat of Wasp. Desert Rock VI. |
| HA | April 6, 1955 18:00:04.1 | PST (−8 h) | NTS Area 1 37.0286°N 116.0586°W | 1,280 m (4,200 ft) + 11.16 kilometres (6.93 mi) | parachuted | weapon effect | | 3.2 kt | I-131 venting detected, 450 kCi (17,000 TBq) | | Last airdrop over continental U.S. "High altitude" test of air-air missile warhead similar to Wasp Prime; parachute retarded (only one at NTS). |
| Post | April 9, 1955 12:00:30.2 | PST (−8 h) | NTS Area 9 37.1226°N 116.0347°W | 1,294 m (4,245 ft) + 90 m (300 ft) | tower | weapons development | Cleo II | 2 kt | I-131 venting detected, 340 kCi (13,000 TBq) | | LLNL Linear implosion. ENS initiated. |
| MET | April 15, 1955 19:00:15.3 | PST (−8 h) | NTS Area 5 36.798°N 115.9298°W | 940 m (3,080 ft) + 120 m (390 ft) | tower | weapon effect | | 22 kt | I-131 venting detected, 3.1 MCi (110 PBq) | | "Military Effects Tower". Supposed to be a standard effects test, LASL clandestinely substituted experimental U233/Pu core, thus undershot estimated yield by a third. Desert Rock VI. |
| Apple-2 | May 5, 1955 12:00:10.0 | PST (−8 h) | NTS Area 1 37.053°N 116.1034°W | 1,294 m (4,245 ft) + 150 m (490 ft) | tower | weapons development | | 29 kt | I-131 venting detected, 4.1 MCi (150 PBq) | | Retry of Apple-1. Desert Rock VI. Operation Cue, civil defense exercise. |
| Zucchini | May 15, 1955 11:59:59.9 | PST (−8 h) | NTS Area 7 37.0947°N 116.0248°W | 1,294 m (4,245 ft) + 150 m (490 ft) | tower | weapons development | | 28 kt | I-131 venting detected, 4 MCi (150 PBq) | | Test of Class D primary/secondary system. |

Table notes:

== Gallery ==
Teapot-Hornet, 4-kilotons

Teapot-Bee, 8-kilotons

Teapot-Turk, 43-kilotons

Teapot-Turk, close-up of fireball within first few milliseconds of detonations

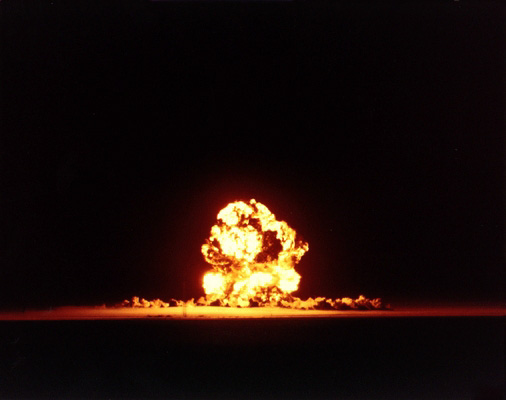
Teapot-Moth, 2-kilotons

"Effects Sub-surface". Test for ADM (Atomic Demolition Munition)

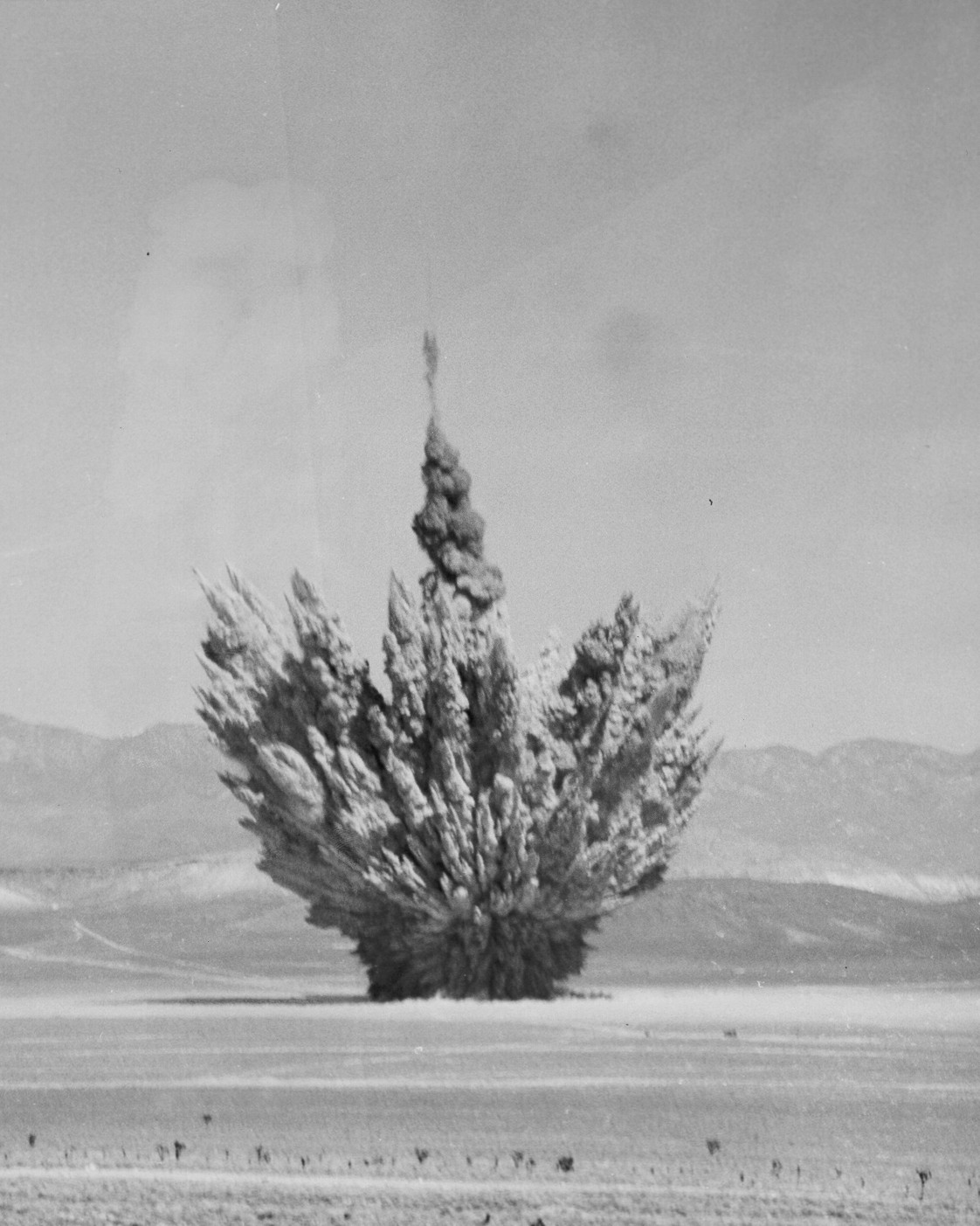
Teapot-ESS, 1-kiloton

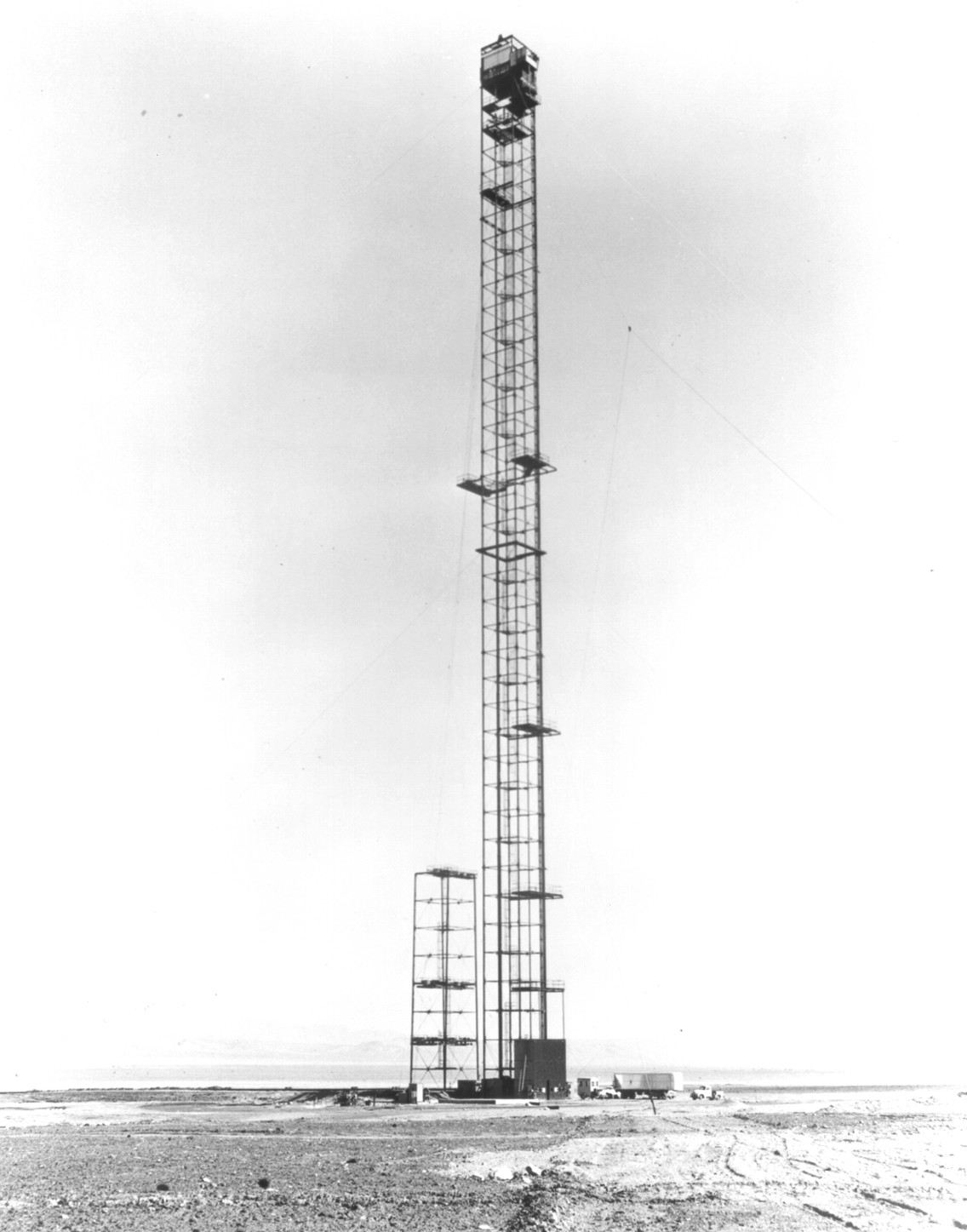
One of the shot-towers of the Teapot test, unknown device

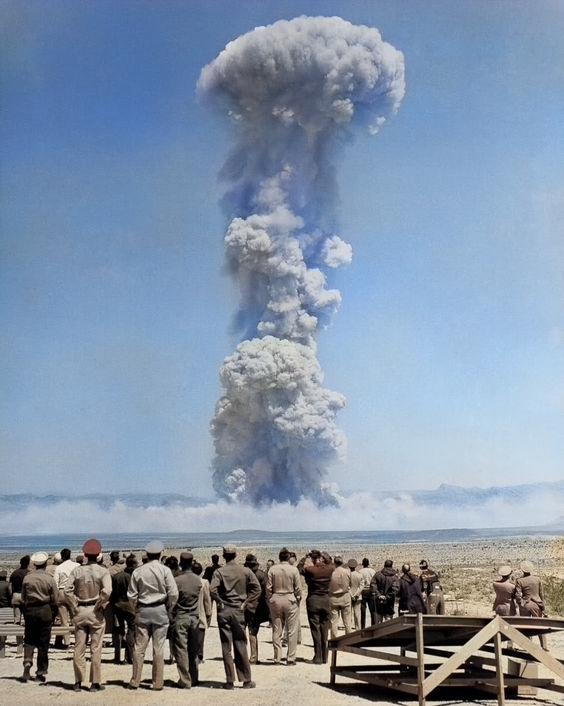
Teapot-MET (Military Effects Test), 22-kilotons

=== Video resources ===
Operation Teapot Military Effects Study (1955) Official AEC de-classified information film reel.

Effects of an Atomic Blast Electric Power Facilities Operation Teapot (1955) Official AEC de-classified information film reel.

Operation Cue (1955) Official AEC de-classified information film reel.

== See also ==
- List of United States' nuclear weapons tests
