= Desert Rock exercises =

Series of U.S. military exercises conducted in conjunction with atmospheric nuclear tests

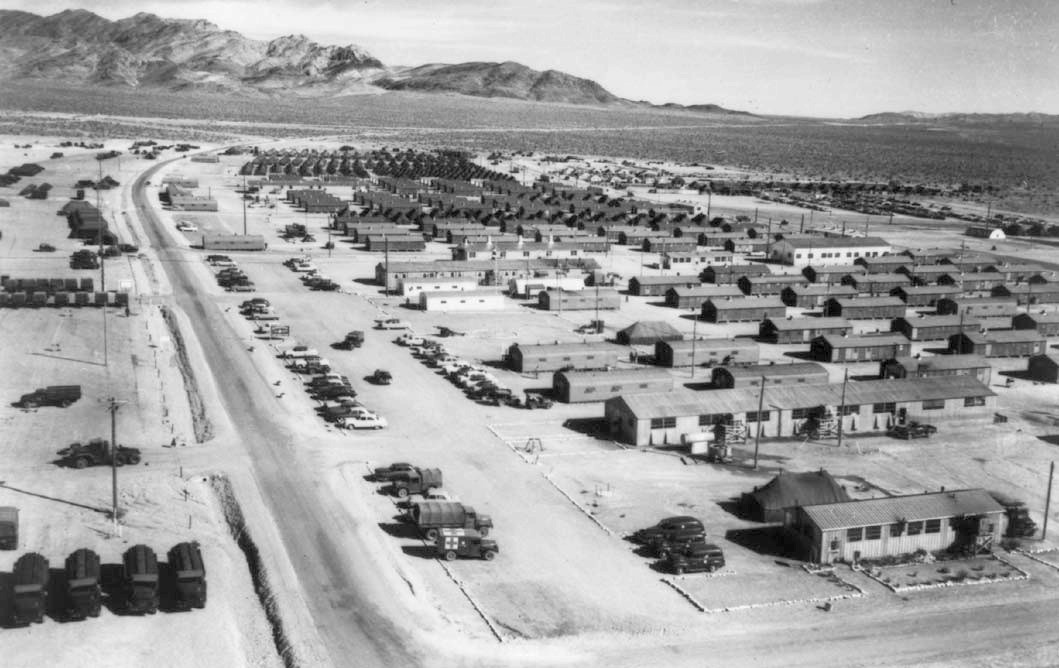
Aerial view of Camp Desert Rock

Desert Rock was the code name of a series of exercises conducted by the US military in conjunction with atmospheric nuclear tests. They were carried out at the Nevada Proving Grounds between 1951 and 1957.

Their purpose was to train troops and gain knowledge of military maneuvers and operations on the nuclear battlefield. They included observer programs, tactical maneuvers, and damage effects tests.

Camp Desert Rock (36.6256°N 116.0217°W) was established in 1951, 1.5 miles (2.4 kilometers) south of Camp Mercury. The site was used to billet troops and stage equipment. The camp was discontinued as an Army installation in 1964.

== Summary ==
Exercise	Nuclear test series	Date	Total DoD participants	Tactical maneuver personnel
Desert Rock I, II, III	Operation Buster–Jangle	22 Oct. – 22 Nov. 1951	11,000	6,500
Desert Rock IV	Operation Tumbler–Snapper	1 Apr. – 5 Jun. 1952	11,700	7,400
Desert Rock V	Operation Upshot–Knothole	17 Mar. – 4 Jun. 1953	20,100	
Desert Rock VI	Operation Teapot	18 Feb. – 15 May 1955	11,700	8,000
Desert Rock VII, VIII	Operation Plumbbob	24 Apr. – 7 Oct. 1957	14,000	

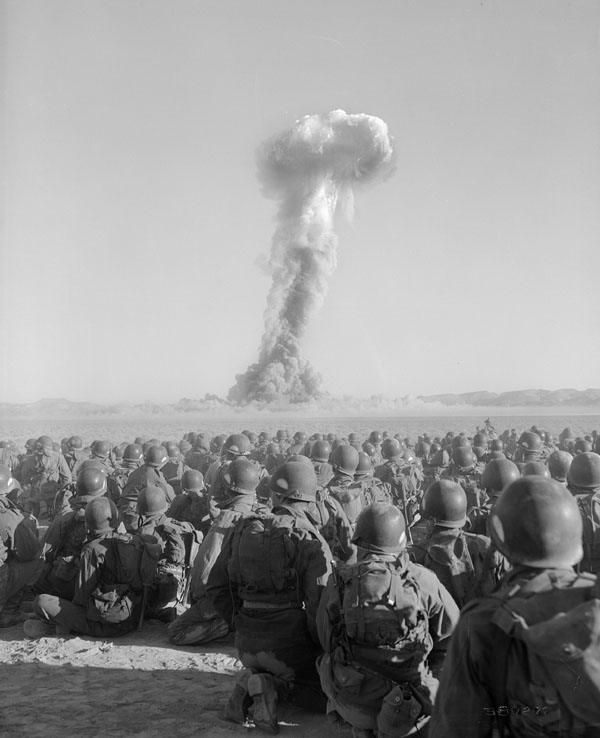
Desert Rock I, Buster-Jangle Dog, November 1, 1951

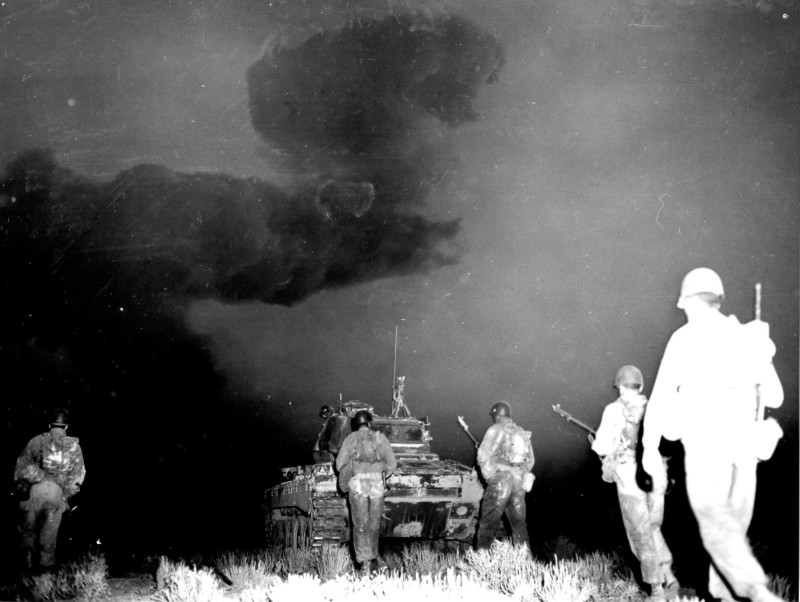
Desert Rock IV, Tumbler-Snapper George, June 1, 1952

== Desert Rock I, II, III ==
Observer programs were conducted at shots Dog, Sugar, and Uncle. Tactical maneuvers were conducted after shot Dog. Damage effects tests were conducted at shots Dog, Sugar, and Uncle to determine the effects of a nuclear detonation on military equipment and field fortifications.

== Desert Rock IV ==
Observer programs were conducted at shots Charlie, Dog, Fox, and George. Tactical maneuvers were conducted after shots Charlie, Dog, and George. Psychological tests were conducted at shots Charlie, Fox, and George to determine the troops' reactions to witnessing a nuclear detonation.

== Desert Rock V ==
Observer programs were conducted at shots Annie, Badger, Encore, and Grable. Exercise Desert Rock V included troop orientation and training, a volunteer officer observer program, tactical troop maneuvers, operational helicopter tests, and damage effects evaluation.

== Desert Rock VI ==
Observer programs were conducted at shots Wasp, Moth, Tesla, Turk, Bee, Ess, Apple 1, and Apple 2. Tactical maneuvers were conducted after shots Bee and Apple 2. Technical studies were conducted at shots Wasp, Moth, Tesla, Turk, Bee, Ess, Apple 1, Wasp Prime, Met, and Apple 2.

A test of an armored task force, RAZOR, was conducted at shot Apple 2 to demonstrate the capability of a reinforced tank battalion to seize an objective immediately after a nuclear detonation.

== Desert Rock VII, VIII ==
Tactical maneuvers were conducted after shots Hood, Smoky, and Galileo. At shot Hood, the Marine Corps conducted a maneuver involving the use of a helicopter airlift and tactical air support. At shot Smoky, Army troops conducted an airlift assault, and at shot Galileo, Army troops were tested to determine their psychological reactions to witnessing a nuclear detonation.

== See also ==
- Totskoye nuclear exercise of 1954, a somewhat comparable series of Soviet exercises.
