= Mount Lazarev =

Massif on Yuzhny Island, Novaya Zemlya, in Russia

- Гора Лазарева
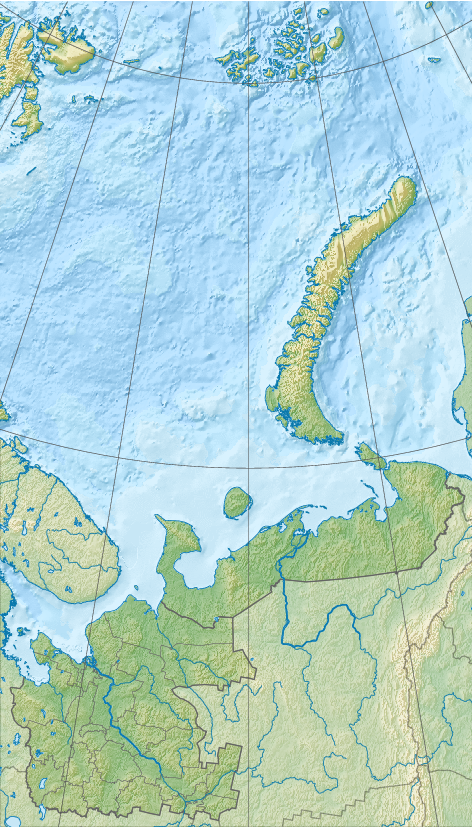
- Location within Arkhangelsk Oblast

Highest point
- Elevation: 671 m (2,201 ft)
- Coordinates: 73°23′N 54°50′E

Geography
- Location: Yuzhny Island, Novaya Zemlya, Arkhangelsk Oblast, Russia

Mount Lazarev (Гора Лазарева, "Gora Lazareva") is a massif on the northern portion of Yuzhny Island, Novaya Zemlya, in Russia. It was used for many Soviet nuclear tests, starting with the first underground nuclear test on Novaya Zemlya, 18 September 1964, which may have resulted in tired mountain syndrome.
