= Tired mountain syndrome =

Geologic damage caused by underground nuclear testing

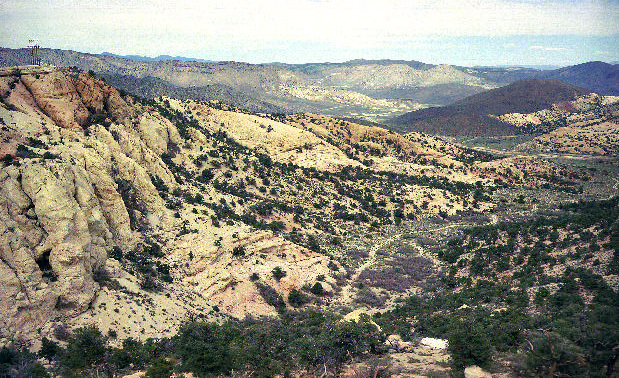
Rainier Mesa at the Nevada Test Site

Tired mountain syndrome is a condition in which underground nuclear testing fractures and weakens rock, increasing permeability and the risk of release of radionuclides and radioactive contamination of the environment. Locations said to have undergone the syndrome include the French Polynesian island of Moruroa, Rainier Mesa in the United States, the Dnepr 1 nuclear test site on the Kola Peninsula in Russia, possibly Mount Lazarev in the Novaya Zemlya Test Site in Russia, (Note: The Matochkin Shar site 73.39°N 54.40°E is called out in a 1993 USGS report; the report does not mention tired mountain syndrome by name, but notes 72 percent of the 36 tests at Matochkin Shar leaked radionuclides, and in four tests seepage along fractures or faults in the rock is "specifically described" in Russian geological reports.) and Mount Mantap in North Korea.

== See also ==
- Subsidence crater
