= Operation Phalanx =

Series of 1980s US nuclear tests

Phalanx

Information
- Country: United States
- Test site: NTS Area 12, Rainier Mesa; NTS Area 19, 20, Pahute Mesa; NTS, Areas 1–4, 6–10, Yucca Flat
- Period: 1982–1983
- Number of tests: 18
- Test type: underground cavity in tunnel, underground shaft, tunnel
- Max. yield: 143 kilotonnes of TNT (600 TJ)

Test series chronology

The United States's Phalanx nuclear test series was a group of 18 nuclear tests conducted in 1982–1983. These tests (Note: A bomb test may be a salvo test, defined as two or more explosions "where a period of time between successive individual explosions does not exceed 5 seconds and where the burial points of all explosive devices can be connected by segments of straight lines, each of them connecting two burial points and does not exceed 40 kilometers in length". Mikhailov, V. N. "Catalog of World Wide Nuclear Testing". Begell-Atom. Archived from the original on April 26, 2014.) followed the Operation Praetorian series and preceded the Operation Fusileer series.

United States' Phalanx series tests and detonations
Name (Note: The US, France and Great Britain have code-named their test events, while the USSR and China did not, and therefore have only test numbers (with some exceptions – Soviet peaceful explosions were named). Word translations into English in parentheses unless the name is a proper noun. A dash followed by a number indicates a member of a salvo event. The US also sometimes named the individual explosions in such a salvo test, which results in "name1 – 1(with name2)". If test is canceled or aborted, then the row data like date and location discloses the intended plans, where known.)	Date time (UT)	Local time zone (Note: To convert the UT time into standard local, add the number of hours in parentheses to the UT time; for local daylight saving time, add one additional hour. If the result is earlier than 00:00, add 24 hours and subtract 1 from the day; if it is 24:00 or later, subtract 24 hours and add 1 to the day. Historical time zone data obtained from the IANA time zone database.)	Location (Note: Rough place name and a latitude/longitude reference; for rocket-carried tests, the launch location is specified before the detonation location, if known. Some locations are extremely accurate; others (like airdrops and space blasts) may be quite inaccurate. "~" indicates a likely pro-forma rough location, shared with other tests in that same area.)	Elevation + height (Note: Elevation is the ground level at the point directly below the explosion relative to sea level; height is the additional distance added or subtracted by tower, balloon, shaft, tunnel, air drop or other contrivance. For rocket bursts the ground level is "N/A". In some cases it is not clear if the height is absolute or relative to ground, for example, Plumbbob/John. No number or units indicates the value is unknown, while "0" means zero. Sorting on this column is by elevation and height added together.)	Delivery (Note: Atmospheric, airdrop, balloon, gun, cruise missile, rocket, surface, tower, and barge are all disallowed by the Partial Nuclear Test Ban Treaty. Sealed shaft and tunnel are underground, and remained useful under the PTBT. Intentional cratering tests are borderline; they occurred under the treaty, were sometimes protested, and generally overlooked if the test was declared to be a peaceful use.) Purpose (Note: Include weapons development, weapon effects, safety test, transport safety test, war, science, joint verification and industrial/peaceful, which may be further broken down.)	Device (Note: Designations for test items where known, "?" indicates some uncertainty about the preceding value, nicknames for particular devices in quotes. This category of information is often not officially disclosed.)	Yield (Note: Estimated energy yield in tons, kilotons, and megatons. A ton of TNT equivalent is defined as 4.184 gigajoules (1 gigacalorie).)	Fallout (Note: Radioactive emission to the atmosphere aside from prompt neutrons, where known. The measured species is only iodine-131 if mentioned, otherwise it is all species. No entry means unknown, probably none if underground and "all" if not; otherwise notation for whether measured on the site only or off the site, where known, and the measured amount of radioactivity released.)	References	Notes
Seyval	November 12, 1982 19:17:00.1	PST (–8 hrs)	NTS Area U3lm 37.02323°N 116.03272°W	1,187 m (3,894 ft) – 366.06 m (1,201.0 ft)	underground shaft, weapons development		5 kt			
Manteca	December 10, 1982 15:20:00.09	PST (–8 hrs)	NTS Area U4al 37.08014°N 116.07276°W	1,236 m (4,055 ft) – 413 m (1,355 ft)	underground shaft, weapons development		20 kt	Venting detected, 78 Ci (2,900 GBq)		
Coalora	February 11, 1983 16:00:00.1	PST (–8 hrs)	NTS Area U3lo 37.05622°N 116.04613°W	1,210 m (3,970 ft) – 274 m (899 ft)	underground shaft, weapons development		less than 20 kt			
Cheedam	February 17, 1983 17:00:00.09	PST (–8 hrs)	NTS Area U2et 37.16281°N 116.06409°W	1,293 m (4,242 ft) – 343 m (1,125 ft)	underground shaft, weapons development		1.5 kt	Venting detected, 0.2 Ci (7.4 GBq)		
Cabra	March 26, 1983 20:20:00.09	PST (–8 hrs)	NTS Area U20aj 37.30063°N 116.46092°W	1,907 m (6,257 ft) – 542.5 m (1,780 ft)	underground shaft, weapons development		45 kt			
Turquoise	April 14, 1983 19:05:00.12	PST (–8 hrs)	NTS Area U7bu 37.07279°N 116.04682°W	1,219 m (3,999 ft) – 533.1 m (1,749 ft)	underground shaft, weapons development		84 kt	I-131 venting detected, 0.000003 Ci (0.00011 GBq)		
Crowdie	May 5, 1983 15:20:00.08	PST (–8 hrs)	NTS Area U2fe 37.14567°N 116.09021°W	1,309 m (4,295 ft) – 390 m (1,280 ft)	underground shaft, weapons development		6 kt	Venting detected, 7 Ci (260 GBq)		
Mini Jade	May 26, 1983 14:30:00.09	PST (–8 hrs)	NTS Area U12n.12 37.20821°N 116.20599°W	1,828 m (5,997 ft) – 379.2 m (1,244 ft)	underground cavity in tunnel, weapon effect		4 kt	Venting detected, 1 Ci (37 GBq)		
Fahada	May 26, 1983 15:00:00.09	PST (–8 hrs)	NTS Area U7bh 37.10286°N 116.00657°W	1,312 m (4,304 ft) – 384.4 m (1,261 ft)	underground shaft, weapons development		6 kt			
Danablu	June 9, 1983 17:10:00.088	PST (–8 hrs)	NTS Area U2eu 37.15757°N 116.0901°W	1,327 m (4,354 ft) – 320 m (1,050 ft)	underground shaft, weapons development		6 kt	I-131 venting detected, 0		
Laban	August 3, 1983 13:33:00.1	PST (–8 hrs)	NTS Area U2ff 37.11904°N 116.08989°W	1,276 m (4,186 ft) – 326 m (1,070 ft)	underground shaft, weapons development		2.5 kt	Venting detected, 51 Ci (1,900 GBq)		
Sabado	August 11, 1983 14:00:00.12	PST (–8 hrs)	NTS Area U3lc 36.99766°N 116.00338°W	1,175 m (3,855 ft) – 320 m (1,050 ft)	underground shaft, weapons development		5 kt			
Jarlsberg	August 27, 1983 14:00:00.09	PST (–8 hrs)	NTS Area U10ca 37.19289°N 116.03491°W	1,318 m (4,324 ft) – 200 m (660 ft)	underground shaft, weapons development		2 kt	Venting detected		
Chancellor	September 1, 1983 14:00:00.08	PST (–8 hrs)	NTS Area U19ad 37.27272°N 116.35591°W	2,013 m (6,604 ft) – 623.6 m (2,046 ft)	underground shaft, weapons development	W80	143 kt			Stockpile confidence test
Tomme/Midnight Zephyr	September 21, 1983 15:00:00.09	PST (–8 hrs)	NTS Area U12n.18 37.20969°N 116.21013°W	2,230 m (7,320 ft) – 404.8 m (1,328 ft)	tunnel, weapon effect		less than 20 kt			
Branco - 1	September 21, 1983 16:25:00.08	PST (–8 hrs)	NTS Area U2ew 37.12131°N 116.05645°W	1,256 m (4,121 ft) – 293 m (961 ft)	underground shaft, weapons development		600 t			Simultaneous, same hole.
Branco-Herkimer - 2	September 21, 1983 16:25:00.08	PST (–8 hrs)	NTS Area U2ew 37.12131°N 116.05645°W	1,256 m (4,121 ft) +	underground shaft, weapons development		2 kt			Simultaneous, same hole.
Techado	September 22, 1983 15:00:00.12	PST (–8 hrs)	NTS Area U4o 37.10556°N 116.05026°W	1,241 m (4,072 ft) – 532.5 m (1,747 ft)	underground shaft, weapons development		2 kt			
Navata	September 29, 1983 15:00:00.09	PST (–8 hrs)	NTS Area U3lb 37.05338°N 116.02109°W	1,207 m (3,960 ft) – 182.9 m (600 ft)	underground shaft, safety experiment		less than 20 kt			
