= Operation Guardian =

Series of 1980s US nuclear tests

Guardian

Information
- Country: United States
- Test site: NTS Area 12, Rainier Mesa; NTS Area 19, 20, Pahute Mesa; NTS, Areas 1–4, 6–10, Yucca Flat
- Period: 1980–1981
- Number of tests: 14
- Test type: underground shaft, tunnel
- Max. yield: 140 kilotonnes of TNT (590 TJ)

Test series chronology

Operation Guardian was a series of 14 nuclear tests conducted by the United States in 1980–1981 at the Nevada Test Site. These tests followed the Operation Tinderbox series and preceded the Operation Praetorian series.

United States' Guardian series tests and detonations
Name (Note: The US, France and Great Britain have code-named their test events, while the USSR and China did not, and therefore have only test numbers (with some exceptions – Soviet peaceful explosions were named). Word translations into English in parentheses unless the name is a proper noun. A dash followed by a number indicates a member of a salvo event. The US also sometimes named the individual explosions in such a salvo test, which results in "name1 – 1(with name2)". If test is canceled or aborted, then the row data like date and location discloses the intended plans, where known.)	Date time (UT)	Local time zone (Note: To convert the UT time into standard local, add the number of hours in parentheses to the UT time; for local daylight saving time, add one additional hour. If the result is earlier than 00:00, add 24 hours and subtract 1 from the day; if it is 24:00 or later, subtract 24 hours and add 1 to the day. Historical time zone data obtained from the IANA time zone database.)	Location (Note: Rough place name and a latitude/longitude reference; for rocket-carried tests, the launch location is specified before the detonation location, if known. Some locations are extremely accurate; others (like airdrops and space blasts) may be quite inaccurate. "~" indicates a likely pro-forma rough location, shared with other tests in that same area.)	Elevation + height (Note: Elevation is the ground level at the point directly below the explosion relative to sea level; height is the additional distance added or subtracted by tower, balloon, shaft, tunnel, air drop or other contrivance. For rocket bursts the ground level is "N/A". In some cases it is not clear if the height is absolute or relative to ground, for example, Plumbbob/John. No number or units indicates the value is unknown, while "0" means zero. Sorting on this column is by elevation and height added together.)	Delivery (Note: Atmospheric, airdrop, balloon, gun, cruise missile, rocket, surface, tower, and barge are all disallowed by the Partial Nuclear Test Ban Treaty. Sealed shaft and tunnel are underground, and remained useful under the PTBT. Intentional cratering tests are borderline; they occurred under the treaty, were sometimes protested, and generally overlooked if the test was declared to be a peaceful use.) Purpose (Note: Include weapons development, weapon effects, safety test, transport safety test, war, science, joint verification and industrial/peaceful, which may be further broken down.)	Device (Note: Designations for test items where known, "?" indicates some uncertainty about the preceding value, nicknames for particular devices in quotes. This category of information is often not officially disclosed.)	Yield (Note: Estimated energy yield in tons, kilotons, and megatons. A ton of TNT equivalent is defined as 4.184 gigajoules (1 gigacalorie).)	Fallout (Note: Radioactive emission to the atmosphere aside from prompt neutrons, where known. The measured species is only iodine-131 if mentioned, otherwise it is all species. No entry means unknown, probably none if underground and "all" if not; otherwise notation for whether measured on the site only or off the site, where known, and the measured amount of radioactivity released.)	References	Notes
Miners Iron	October 31, 1980 18:00:00.09	PST (–8 hrs)	NTS Area U12n.11 37.21121°N 116.20626°W	2,212 m (7,257 ft) – 389.5 m (1,278 ft)	tunnel, weapon effect		10 kt	Venting detected, 0.3 Ci (11 GBq)		
Dauphin	November 14, 1980 16:50:00.084	PST (–8 hrs)	NTS Area U9cq 37.11144°N 116.01952°W	1,306 m (4,285 ft) – 320 m (1,050 ft)	underground shaft, weapons development	Experimental test for nuclear pumped x-ray laser	2 kt			
Baseball	January 15, 1981 20:25:00.09	PST (–8 hrs)	NTS Area U7ba 37.08675°N 116.04585°W	1,232 m (4,042 ft) – 563.88 m (1,850.0 ft)	underground shaft, weapons development	W76	99 kt			Stockpile confidence test
Clairette	February 5, 1981 18:00:00.117	PST (–8 hrs)	NTS Area U3kr 37.01088°N 116.03291°W	1,182 m (3,878 ft) – 353.6 m (1,160 ft)	underground shaft, weapons development	W80	less than 20 kt			W80 low temperature test. Fizzled
Seco	February 25, 1981 15:00:00.082	PST (–8 hrs)	NTS Area U8l 37.18185°N 116.08512°W	1,356 m (4,449 ft) – 200 m (660 ft)	underground shaft, weapons development		less than 20 kt			
Vide	April 30, 1981 14:35:00.084	PST (–8 hrs)	NTS Area U8k 37.17731°N 116.08567°W	1,346 m (4,416 ft) – 323 m (1,060 ft)	underground shaft, weapons development		less than 20 kt	Venting detected, 3 Ci (110 GBq)		
Aligote	May 29, 1981 16:00:00.094	PST (–8 hrs)	NTS Area U7bg 37.1018°N 116.00493°W	1,311 m (4,301 ft) – 320 m (1,050 ft)	underground shaft, weapons development		2.5 kt			
Harzer	June 6, 1981 18:00:00.084	PST (–8 hrs)	NTS Area U19aj 37.30334°N 116.32648°W	2,073 m (6,801 ft) – 637 m (2,090 ft)	underground shaft, weapons development		140 kt			
Niza	July 10, 1981 14:00:00.096	PST (–8 hrs)	NTS Area U9cr 37.12856°N 116.03464°W	1,266 m (4,154 ft) – 341 m (1,119 ft)	underground shaft, weapons development		4 kt	I-131 venting detected, 0		
Pineau	July 16, 1981 15:00:00.096	PST (–8 hrs)	NTS Area U7ao 37.08865°N 116.02024°W	1,259 m (4,131 ft) – 207.26 m (680.0 ft)	underground shaft, weapons development		less than 20 kt			
Havarti	August 5, 1981 13:41:00.086	PST (–8 hrs)	NTS Area U10bg 37.15369°N 116.03594°W	1,283 m (4,209 ft) – 200 m (660 ft)	underground shaft, weapons development		less than 20 kt	I-131 venting detected, 0		
Islay	August 27, 1981 14:31:00.088	PST (–8 hrs)	NTS Area U2er 37.16038°N 116.06743°W	1,297 m (4,255 ft) – 294 m (965 ft)	underground shaft, weapons development		4 kt	Venting detected, 700 Ci (26,000 GBq)		
Trebbiano	September 4, 1981 15:00:00.103	PST (–8 hrs)	NTS Area U3lj 37.05806°N 116.04894°W	1,211 m (3,973 ft) – 305.4 m (1,002 ft)	underground shaft, weapons development		1 kt	Venting detected, 200 Ci (7,400 GBq)		
Cernada	September 24, 1981 15:00:00.089	PST (–8 hrs)	NTS Area U3kk 37.00851°N 116.02453°W	1,181 m (3,875 ft) – 213.2 m (699 ft)	underground shaft, weapons development		less than 20 kt			

== Sources ==
- Hansen, Chuck (2007) [1995]. Swords of Armageddon: U.S. Nuclear Weapons Development since 1945 (PDF: CD-ROM & download available) (2nd ed.). Sunnyvale, CA: Chukelea Publications. ISBN 978-0-9791915-0-3.
