= Operation Praetorian =

Series of 1980s US nuclear tests

Praetorian

Information
- Country: United States
- Test site: NTS Area 12, Rainier Mesa; NTS Area 19, 20, Pahute Mesa; NTS, Areas 1–4, 6–10, Yucca Flat
- Period: 1981–1982
- Number of tests: 19
- Test type: underground shaft, tunnel
- Max. yield: 140 kilotonnes of TNT (590 TJ)

Test series chronology

The United States's Praetorian nuclear test series was a group of 19 nuclear tests conducted in 1981–1982. These tests (Note: A bomb test may be a salvo test, defined as two or more explosions "where a period of time between successive individual explosions does not exceed 5 seconds and where the burial points of all explosive devices can be connected by segments of straight lines, each of them connecting two burial points and does not exceed 40 kilometers in length".Mikhailov, V. N. "Catalog of World Wide Nuclear Testing". Begell-Atom. Archived from the original on April 26, 2014.) followed the Operation Guardian series and preceded the Operation Phalanx series.

== List of the nuclear tests ==
United States' Praetorian series tests and detonations
Name (Note: The US, France and Great Britain have code-named their test events, while the USSR and China did not, and therefore have only test numbers (with some exceptions – Soviet peaceful explosions were named). Word translations into English in parentheses unless the name is a proper noun. A dash followed by a number indicates a member of a salvo event. The US also sometimes named the individual explosions in such a salvo test, which results in "name1 – 1(with name2)". If test is canceled or aborted, then the row data like date and location discloses the intended plans, where known.)	Date time (UT)	Local time zone (Note: To convert the UT time into standard local, add the number of hours in parentheses to the UT time; for local daylight saving time, add one additional hour. If the result is earlier than 00:00, add 24 hours and subtract 1 from the day; if it is 24:00 or later, subtract 24 hours and add 1 to the day. Historical time zone data obtained from the IANA time zone database.)	Location (Note: Rough place name and a latitude/longitude reference; for rocket-carried tests, the launch location is specified before the detonation location, if known. Some locations are extremely accurate; others (like airdrops and space blasts) may be quite inaccurate. "~" indicates a likely pro-forma rough location, shared with other tests in that same area.)	Elevation + height (Note: Elevation is the ground level at the point directly below the explosion relative to sea level; height is the additional distance added or subtracted by tower, balloon, shaft, tunnel, air drop or other contrivance. For rocket bursts the ground level is "N/A". In some cases it is not clear if the height is absolute or relative to ground, for example, Plumbbob/John. No number or units indicates the value is unknown, while "0" means zero. Sorting on this column is by elevation and height added together.)	Delivery (Note: Atmospheric, airdrop, balloon, gun, cruise missile, rocket, surface, tower, and barge are all disallowed by the Partial Nuclear Test Ban Treaty. Sealed shaft and tunnel are underground, and remained useful under the PTBT. Intentional cratering tests are borderline; they occurred under the treaty, were sometimes protested, and generally overlooked if the test was declared to be a peaceful use.) Purpose (Note: Include weapons development, weapon effects, safety test, transport safety test, war, science, joint verification and industrial/peaceful, which may be further broken down.)	Device (Note: Designations for test items where known, "?" indicates some uncertainty about the preceding value, nicknames for particular devices in quotes. This category of information is often not officially disclosed.)	Yield (Note: Estimated energy yield in tons, kilotons, and megatons. A ton of TNT equivalent is defined as 4.184 gigajoules (1 gigacalorie).)	Fallout (Note: Radioactive emission to the atmosphere aside from prompt neutrons, where known. The measured species is only iodine-131 if mentioned, otherwise it is all species. No entry means unknown, probably none if underground and "all" if not; otherwise notation for whether measured on the site only or off the site, where known, and the measured amount of radioactivity released.)	References	Notes
Paliza	October 1, 1981 19:00:00.1	PST (–8 hrs)	NTS Area U7bd 37.08156°N 116.00962°W	1,260 m (4,130 ft) – 472.1 m (1,549 ft)	underground shaft, weapons development		38 kt			
Tilci	November 11, 1981 20:00:09.086	PST (–8 hrs)	NTS Area U4ak 37.07627°N 116.06936°W	1,232 m (4,042 ft) – 445 m (1,460 ft)	underground shaft, weapons development	W84	29 kt	Venting detected		
Akavi	December 3, 1981 15:00:00.098	PST (–8 hrs)	NTS Area U2es 37.14838°N 116.07171°W	1,293 m (4,242 ft) – 494 m (1,621 ft)	underground shaft, weapons development		20 kt	Venting detected		
Caboc	December 16, 1981 21:05:00.09	PST (–8 hrs)	NTS Area U2cp 37.11447°N 116.12365°W	1,348 m (4,423 ft) – 335 m (1,099 ft)	underground shaft, weapons development		5 kt	Venting detected, 0.3 Ci (11 GBq)		
Jornada	January 28, 1982 16:00:00.104	PST (–8 hrs)	NTS Area U4j 37.09129°N 116.0521°W	1,233 m (4,045 ft) – 638.9 m (2,096 ft)	underground shaft, weapons development	W80	139 kt			
Molbo	February 12, 1982 14:55:00.083	PST (–8 hrs)	NTS Area U20ag 37.22428°N 116.46354°W	1,873 m (6,145 ft) – 638 m (2,093 ft)	underground shaft, weapons development	TX-83	80 kt	I-131 venting detected, 0		
Hosta	February 12, 1982 15:25:00.09Hansen,	PST (–8 hrs)	NTS Area U19ak 37.34792°N 116.31698°W	2,076 m (6,811 ft) – 639.5 m (2,098 ft)	underground shaft, weapons development	B61	140 kt			
Tenaja	April 17, 1982 18:00:00.088	PST (–8 hrs)	NTS Area U3lh 37.01676°N 116.01063°W	1,177 m (3,862 ft) – 356.3 m (1,169 ft)	underground shaft, weapons development	W80	6 kt			
Kryddost	May 6, 1982 20:00:00.083	PST (–8 hrs)	NTS Area U2co 37.11662°N 116.12821°W	1,363 m (4,472 ft) – 335 m (1,099 ft)	underground shaft, weapons development		3.5 kt			
Bouschet	May 7, 1982 18:17:00.11	PST (–8 hrs)	NTS Area U3la 37.069°N 116.04666°W	1,217 m (3,993 ft) – 563.9 m (1,850 ft)	underground shaft, weapons development		99 kt	Venting detected, less than 1 Ci (37 GBq)		
Kesti	June 16, 1982 14:00:00.085	PST (–8 hrs)	NTS Area U9cn 37.11418°N 116.01745°W	1,312 m (4,304 ft) – 289 m (948 ft)	underground shaft, weapons development		less than 20 kt			
Nebbiolo	June 24, 1982 14:15:00.09	PST (–8 hrs)	NTS Area U19ae 37.23616°N 116.37106°W	2,038 m (6,686 ft) – 639.5 m (2,098 ft)	underground shaft, weapons development	B61	140 kt			
Monterey	July 29, 1982 20:05:00.083	PST (–8 hrs)	NTS Area U4aj 37.10234°N 116.07561°W	1,253 m (4,111 ft) – 400 m (1,300 ft)	underground shaft, weapons development		20 kt	Venting detected, 0.1 Ci (3.7 GBq)		
Atrisco	August 5, 1982 14:00:00.09	PST (–8 hrs)	NTS Area U7bp 37.08458°N 116.00705°W	1,268 m (4,160 ft) – 639.78 m (2,099.0 ft)	underground shaft, weapons development		138 kt			
Queso	August 11, 1982 15:00:00.0	PST (–8 hrs)	NTS Area U10bf 37.18974°N 116.04855°W	1,310 m (4,300 ft) – 216 m (709 ft)	underground shaft, weapons development	W79	less than 20 kt			
Cerro	September 2, 1982 14:00:00.085	PST (–8 hrs)	NTS Area U3lf 37.0197°N 116.0164°W	1,184 m (3,885 ft) – 228.6 m (750 ft)	underground shaft, weapons development		less than 20 kt			
Diamond Ace - 2 (with Huron Landing)	September 23, 1982 16:00:00.091	PST (–8 hrs)	NTS Area U12n.15 37.21197°N 116.20764°W	1,824 m (5,984 ft) – 407.26 m (1,336.2 ft)	tunnel, weapon effect		less than 20 kt	Venting detected		Simultaneous.
Huron Landing - 1 (with Diamond Ace)	September 23, 1982 16:00:00.09	PST (–8 hrs)	NTS Area U12n.15 37.21197°N 116.20765°W	1,824 m (5,984 ft) – 408 m (1,339 ft)	tunnel, weapon effect		20 kt	Venting detected, 280 Ci (10,000 GBq)		Simultaneous.
Frisco	September 23, 1982 17:00:00.085	PST (–8 hrs)	NTS Area U8m 37.1747°N 116.08867°W	1,347 m (4,419 ft) – 451 m (1,480 ft)	underground shaft, weapons development		20 kt	Venting detected, 2 Ci (74 GBq)		
Borrego	September 29, 1982 13:30:00.096	PST (–8 hrs)	NTS Area U7br 37.09123°N 116.04546°W	1,234 m (4,049 ft) – 563.3 m (1,848 ft)	underground shaft, weapons development		1 kt			
