= Subsidence crater =

Hole or depression left on the surface over the site of an underground explosion

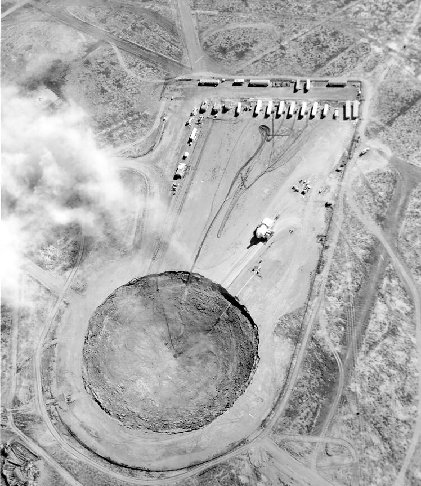
Post-shot subsidence crater and Huron King test chamber, which was less than 20 kilotons (1980)

A subsidence crater is a hole or depression left on the surface of an area which has had an underground (usually nuclear) explosion. Many such craters are commonly present at bomb testing areas; one notable example is the Nevada Test Site, which was historically used for nuclear weapons testing over a period of 41 years.

Subsidence craters are created as the roof of the cavity caused by the explosion collapses. This causes the surface to depress into a sink (which subsidence craters are sometimes called; see sink hole). It is possible for further collapse to occur from the sink into the explosion chamber. When this collapse reaches the surface, and the chamber is exposed atmospherically to the surface, it is referred to as a chimney.

It is at the point that a chimney is formed through which radioactive fallout may reach the surface. At the Nevada Test Site, depths of 100 to 500 meters (330 to 1,640 ft) were used for tests.

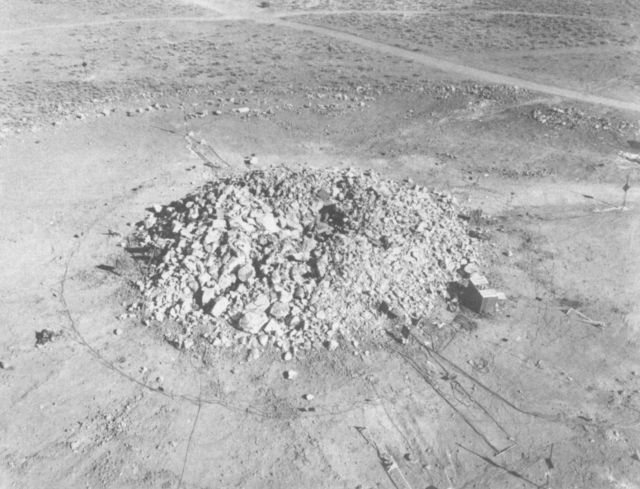
Rubble mound (retarc) formed by the Whetstone Sulky explosion.

When the material above the explosion is solid rock, then a mound may be formed by broken rock that has a greater volume. This type of mound has been called "retarc", "crater" spelled backwards.

When a drilling oil well encounters high-pressured gas which cannot be contained either by the weight of the drilling mud or by blow-out preventers, the resulting violent eruption can create a large crater which can swallow a drilling rig. This phenomenon is called "cratering" in oil field slang. An example is the Darvaza gas crater near Darvaza, Turkmenistan.

== Gallery ==
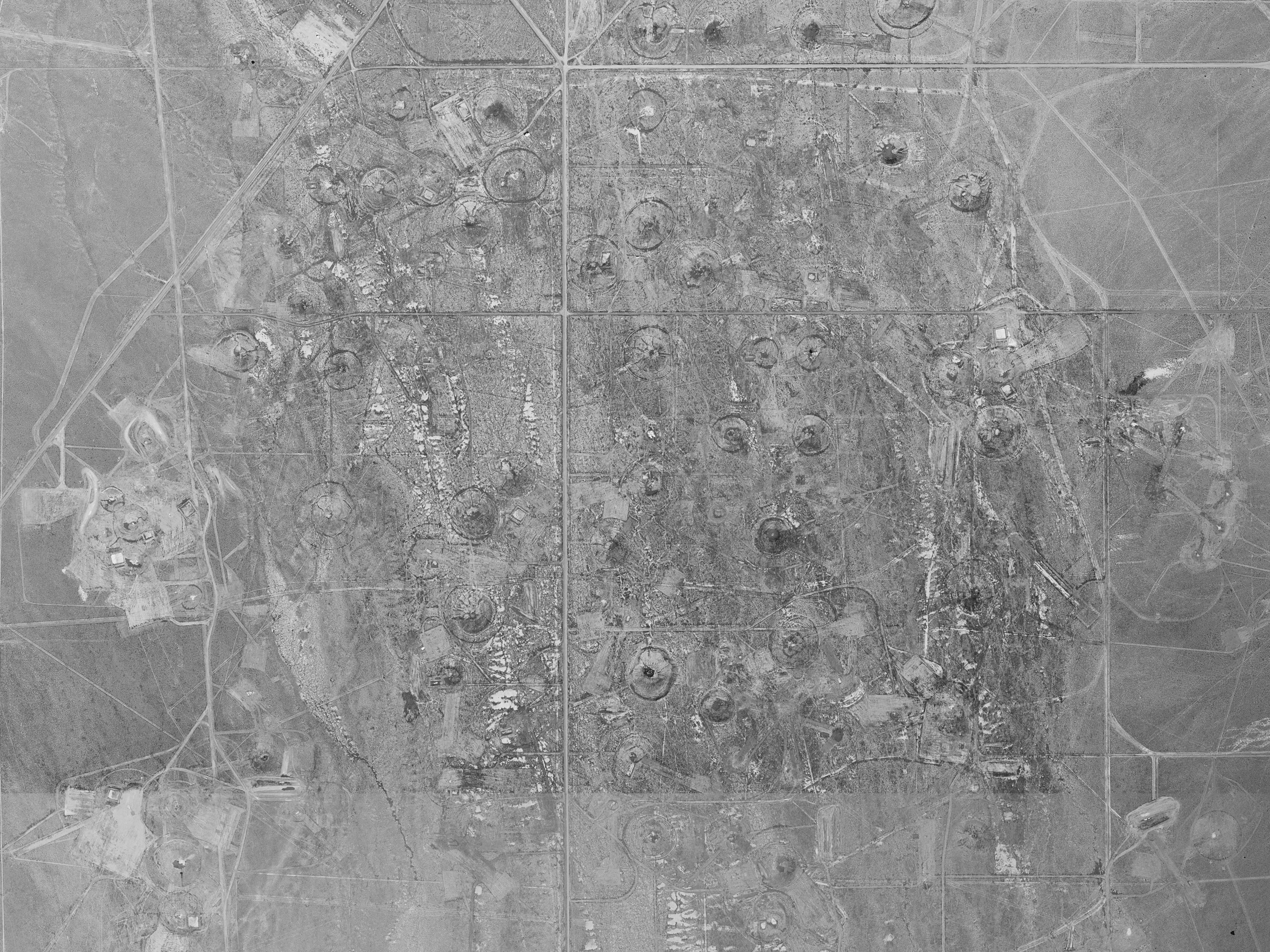
Subsidence craters in the southern section of the Nevada Test Site

Subsidence crater in formation

== See also ==
- Underground nuclear weapons testing
- Explosion crater
- Chagan (nuclear test)
- Sedan (nuclear test)
- Camouflet
- Glory hole (mining), specifically the subsidence crater produced by underground block caving.
- Subsidence (atmosphere) - the similar phenomenon observed in the air, upon cooling.
- Caldera
