= Rainier Mesa =

Area of the Nevada National Security Site, USA

Coordinates: 37.194672°N 116.158442°W

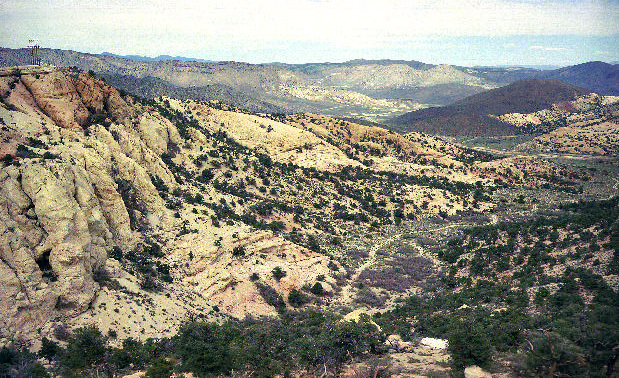
Aerial view of Rainier Mesa

Rainier Mesa is one of four major nuclear test regions within the Nevada National Security Site (NNSS). It occupies approximately 40 square miles (100 km^{2}) along the northern edge of the NNSS and corresponds to Area 12.

The Rainier Mesa area consists of both Rainier Mesa proper and the contiguous Aqueduct Mesa.

At 7,680 feet (2,340 m), the top of Rainier Mesa is the highest elevation within the NNSS.

== Nuclear testing ==
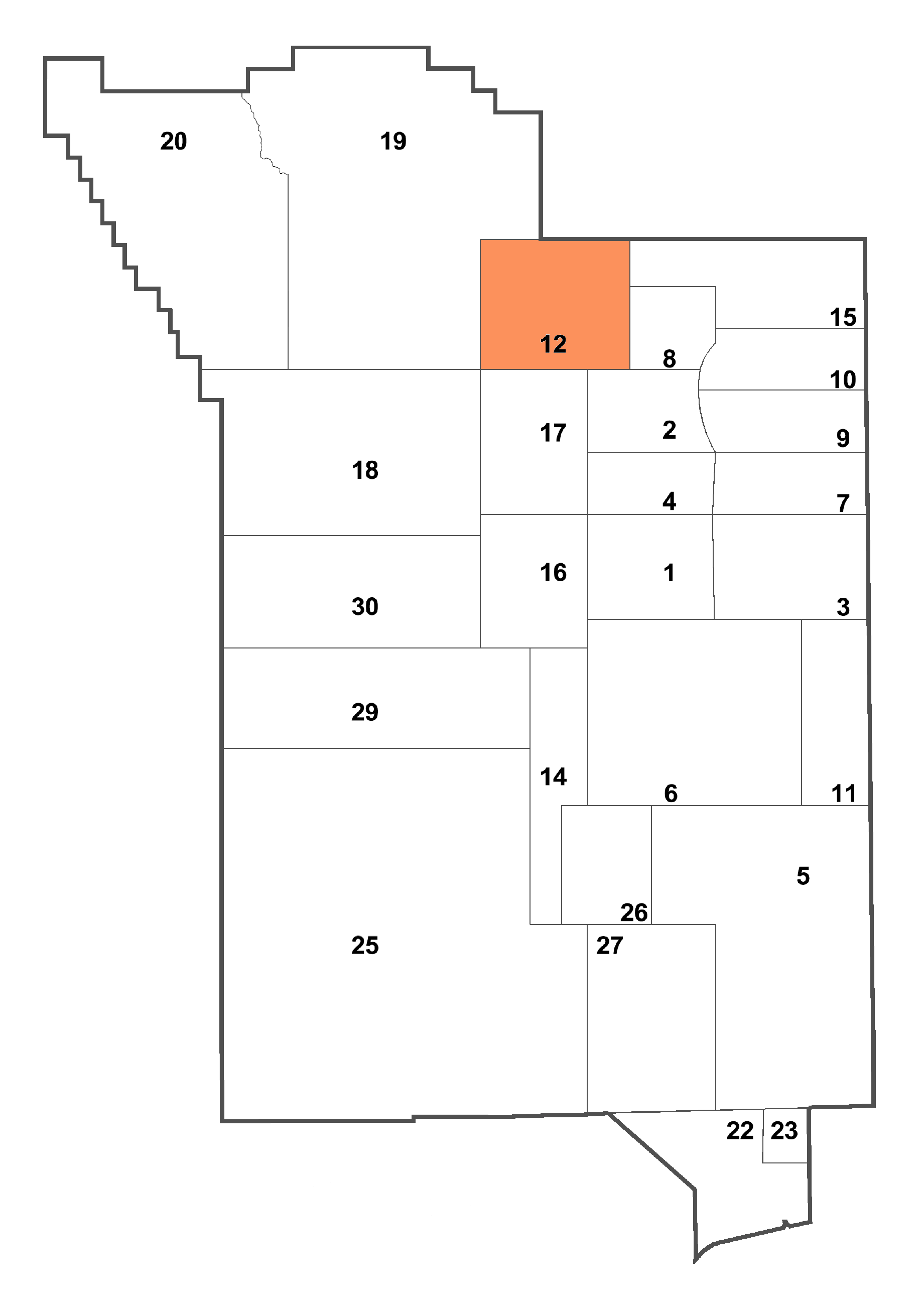
Area 12 within the Nevada National Security Site

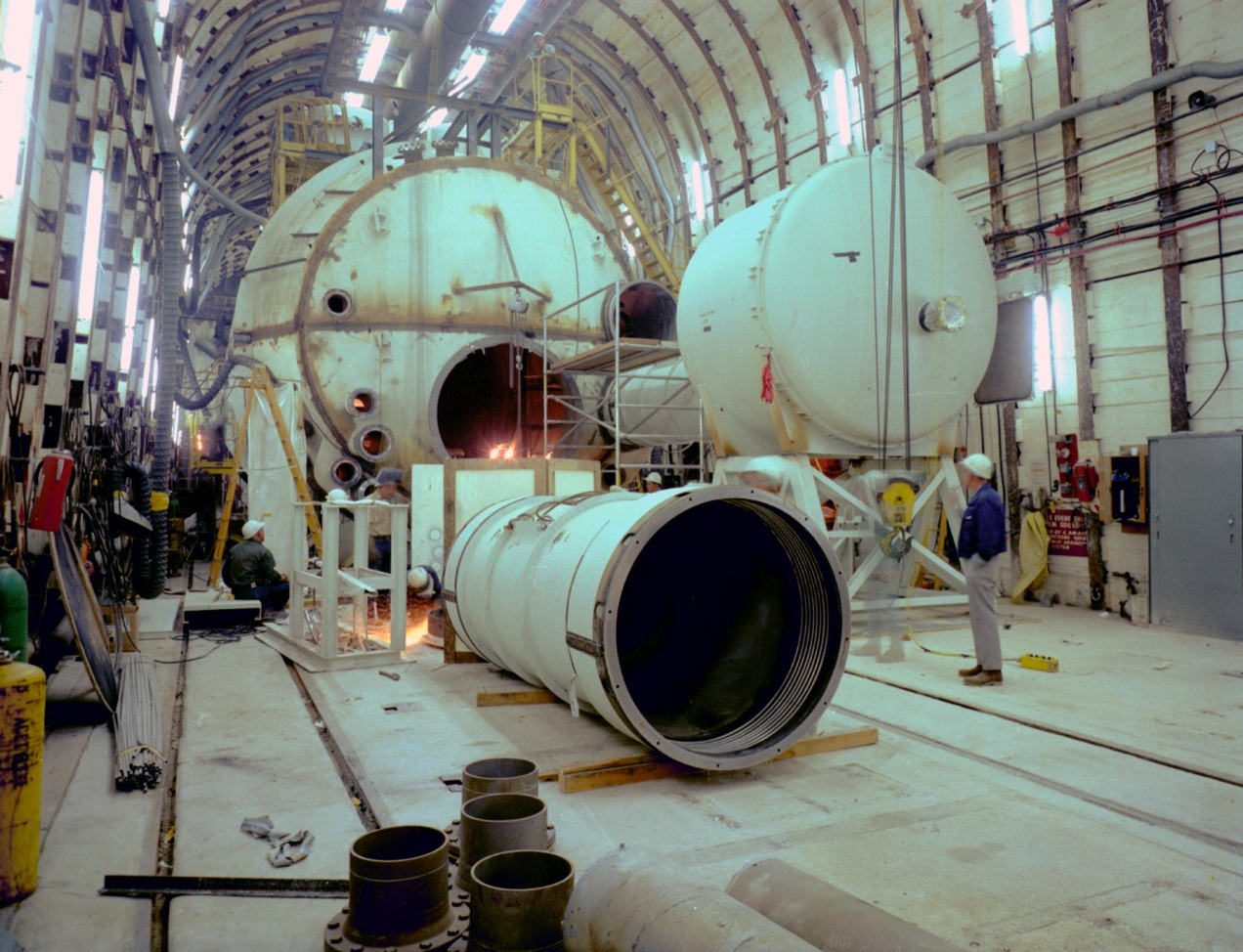
Test Chamber for Operation Toggle Diamond Sculls, inside Rainier Mesa.

Area 12 held 61 nuclear tests between 1957 and 1992, one of which involved two detonations. All tests were conducted below Rainier and Aqueduct mesas.

Area 12 was the primary location for tunnel tests and used almost exclusively for that purpose. (Note: Area 12 held 59 tunnel tests. There were a total of 61 tests in Area 12. The U.S. conducted a total of 67 tunnel tests, all at the NNSS.) The tunnel complexes mined into Rainier and Aqueduct Mesa include the B-, C-, D-, E-, F-, G-, I-, J-, K-, N-, P-, and T-tunnel complexes, and Q- and R- shafts.

There has been some concern that Rainier Mesa is exhibiting signs of tired mountain syndrome, due to the number of nuclear detonations that have occurred at the site.

== Current activities ==
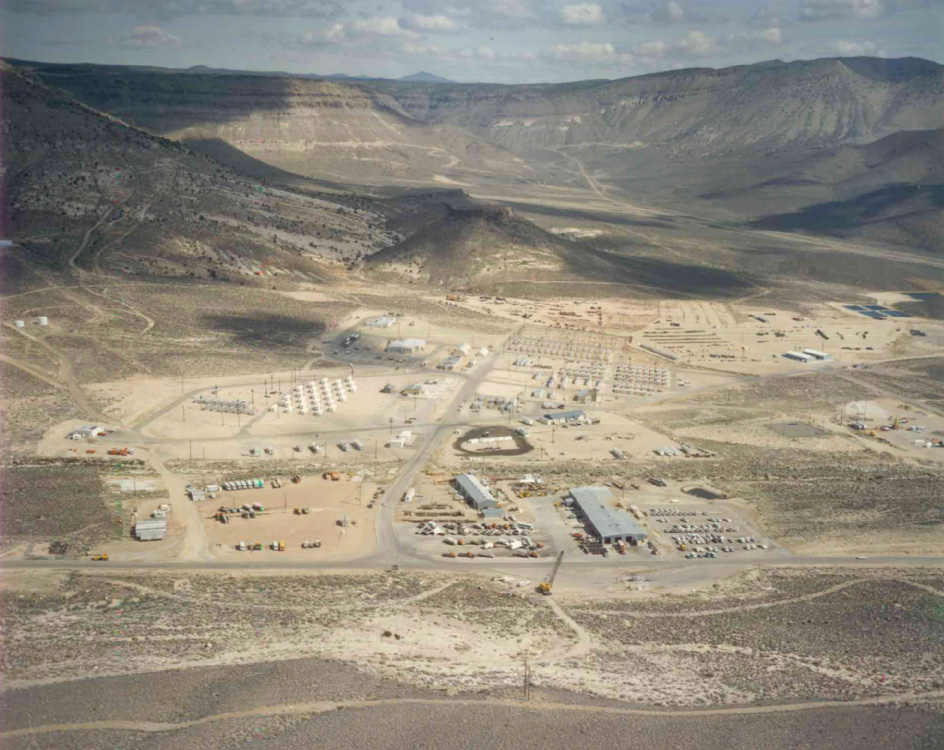
A 600-bed camp in Area 12 served as temporary housing to Mesa-region workers.

The Area 12 Camp was renovated and upgraded and provides a secure base camp for military units and other government agencies for conducting counter-terrorism and other exercises in the northern region of the NNSS. It provides an urban terrain setting utilizing existing commercial, residential, and industrial buildings. The camp includes 200 dormitory rooms, a cafeteria, weapons and munitions storage, and numerous operations and support buildings. The Office of Secure Transportation uses it as a training facility.
