= Operation Quicksilver (1978) =

Series of 1970s US nuclear tests

Quicksilver

Information
- Country: United States
- Test site: NTS Area 19, 20, Pahute Mesa; NTS, Areas 1–4, 6–10, Yucca Flat
- Period: 1978–1979
- Number of tests: 2634
- Test type: underground shaft
- Max. yield: 140 kilotonnes of TNT (590 TJ)

Test series chronology

Operation Quicksilver was a series of 16 nuclear tests conducted by the United States in 1978–1979 at the Nevada Test Site. These tests followed the Operation Cresset series and preceded the Operation Tinderbox series.

United States' Quicksilver series tests and detonations
Name (Note: The US, France and Great Britain have code-named their test events, while the USSR and China did not, and therefore have only test numbers (with some exceptions – Soviet peaceful explosions were named). Word translations into English in parentheses unless the name is a proper noun. A dash followed by a number indicates a member of a salvo event. The US also sometimes named the individual explosions in such a salvo test, which results in "name1 – 1(with name2)". If test is canceled or aborted, then the row data like date and location discloses the intended plans, where known.)	Date time (UT)	Local time zone (Note: To convert the UT time into standard local, add the number of hours in parentheses to the UT time; for local daylight saving time, add one additional hour. If the result is earlier than 00:00, add 24 hours and subtract 1 from the day; if it is 24:00 or later, subtract 24 hours and add 1 to the day. Historical time zone data obtained from the IANA time zone database.)	Location (Note: Rough place name and a latitude/longitude reference; for rocket-carried tests, the launch location is specified before the detonation location, if known. Some locations are extremely accurate; others (like airdrops and space blasts) may be quite inaccurate. "~" indicates a likely pro-forma rough location, shared with other tests in that same area.)	Elevation + height (Note: Elevation is the ground level at the point directly below the explosion relative to sea level; height is the additional distance added or subtracted by tower, balloon, shaft, tunnel, air drop or other contrivance. For rocket bursts the ground level is "N/A". In some cases it is not clear if the height is absolute or relative to ground, for example, Plumbbob/John. No number or units indicates the value is unknown, while "0" means zero. Sorting on this column is by elevation and height added together.)	Delivery (Note: Atmospheric, airdrop, balloon, gun, cruise missile, rocket, surface, tower, and barge are all disallowed by the Partial Nuclear Test Ban Treaty. Sealed shaft and tunnel are underground, and remained useful under the PTBT. Intentional cratering tests are borderline; they occurred under the treaty, were sometimes protested, and generally overlooked if the test was declared to be a peaceful use.) Purpose (Note: Include weapons development, weapon effects, safety test, transport safety test, war, science, joint verification and industrial/peaceful, which may be further broken down.)	Device (Note: Designations for test items where known, "?" indicates some uncertainty about the preceding value, nicknames for particular devices in quotes. This category of information is often not officially disclosed.)	Yield (Note: Estimated energy yield in tons, kilotons, and megatons. A ton of TNT equivalent is defined as 4.184 gigajoules (1 gigacalorie).)	Fallout (Note: Radioactive emission to the atmosphere aside from prompt neutrons, where known. The measured species is only iodine-131 if mentioned, otherwise it is all species. No entry means unknown, probably none if underground and "all" if not; otherwise notation for whether measured on the site only or off the site, where known, and the measured amount of radioactivity released.)	References	Notes
Emmenthal	November 2, 1978 15:25:00.169	PST (–8 hrs)	NTS Area U19t 37.28789°N 116.29838°W	2,104 m (6,903 ft) – 576.1 m (1,890 ft)	underground shaft, weapons development		2.5 kt			
Concentration	December 1, 1978 17:07:30.073	PST (–8 hrs)	NTS Area U3kn 37.02965°N 116.02488°W	1,189 m (3,901 ft) – 247.59 m (812.3 ft)	underground shaft, weapons development		600 t			
Farm	December 16, 1978 15:30:00.158	PST (–8 hrs)	NTS Area U20ab 37.27334°N 116.41116°W	1,979 m (6,493 ft) – 689 m (2,260 ft)	underground shaft, weapons development		140 kt	Venting detected		
Baccarat	January 24, 1979 18:00:00.1	PST (–8 hrs)	NTS Area U7ax 37.10536°N 116.01253°W	1,311 m (4,301 ft) – 326.44 m (1,071.0 ft)	underground shaft, weapons development		6 kt			
Quinella	February 8, 1979 20:00:00.089	PST (–8 hrs)	NTS Area U4l 37.10243°N 116.05571°W	1,241 m (4,072 ft) – 579.1 m (1,900 ft)	underground shaft, weapons development		89 kt			
Kloster	February 15, 1979 18:05:00.165	PST (–8 hrs)	NTS Area U2eo 37.15196°N 116.07271°W	1,297 m (4,255 ft) – 536.4 m (1,760 ft)	underground shaft, weapons development		20 kt	Venting detected		
Memory	March 14, 1979 18:30:00.095	PST (–8 hrs)	NTS Area U3kg 37.02778°N 116.04062°W	1,190 m (3,900 ft) – 364.85 m (1,197.0 ft)	underground shaft, weapons development		5 kt			
Freezeout	May 11, 1979 16:00:00.102	PST (–8 hrs)	NTS Area U3kw 36.99818°N 116.01844°W	1,177 m (3,862 ft) – 335.3 m (1,100 ft)	underground shaft, weapons development		5 kt			
Pepato	June 11, 1979 14:00:00.17	PST (–8 hrs)	NTS Area U20ad 37.28963°N 116.45614°W	1,913 m (6,276 ft) – 681 m (2,234 ft)	underground shaft, weapons development		100 kt	I-131 venting detected, 0		
Chess	June 20, 1979 15:00:13.542	PST (–8 hrs)	NTS Area U7at 37.10761°N 116.01585°W	1,309 m (4,295 ft) – 335.3 m (1,100 ft)	underground shaft, weapons development		1.5 kt			
Fajy	June 28, 1979 14:44:00.167	PST (–8 hrs)	NTS Area U2fc 37.14305°N 116.08847°W	1,303 m (4,275 ft) – 536 m (1,759 ft)	underground shaft, weapons development		22 kt	I-131 venting detected, 0		
Burzet	August 3, 1979 15:07:30.164	PST (–8 hrs)	NTS Area U4ai 37.0839°N 116.07076°W	1,235 m (4,052 ft) – 450 m (1,480 ft)	underground shaft, weapons development		20 kt	Venting detected		
Offshore	August 8, 1979 15:00:00.112	PST (–8 hrs)	NTS Area U3ks 37.0147°N 116.00887°W	1,182 m (3,878 ft) – 396.54 m (1,301.0 ft)	underground shaft, weapons development		20 kt			
Hearts	September 6, 1979 15:00:00.089	PST (–8 hrs)	NTS Area U4n 37.08806°N 116.05356°W	1,232 m (4,042 ft) – 640.02 m (2,099.8 ft)	underground shaft, weapons development		140 kt			Destroyed Cresset/Transom device which didn't detonate.
Pera	September 8, 1979 17:02:00.09	PST (–8 hrs)	NTS Area U10bd 37.15495°N 116.03906°W	1,280 m (4,200 ft) – 200 m (660 ft)	underground shaft, weapons development		5 kt			
Sheepshead	September 26, 1979 15:00:00.091	PST (–8 hrs)	NTS Area U19aa 37.22935°N 116.36482°W	2,033 m (6,670 ft) – 640 m (2,100 ft)	underground shaft, weapons development		140 kt			
