= Operation Tinderbox =

Series of 1970s and 1980s US nuclear tests

Tinderbox
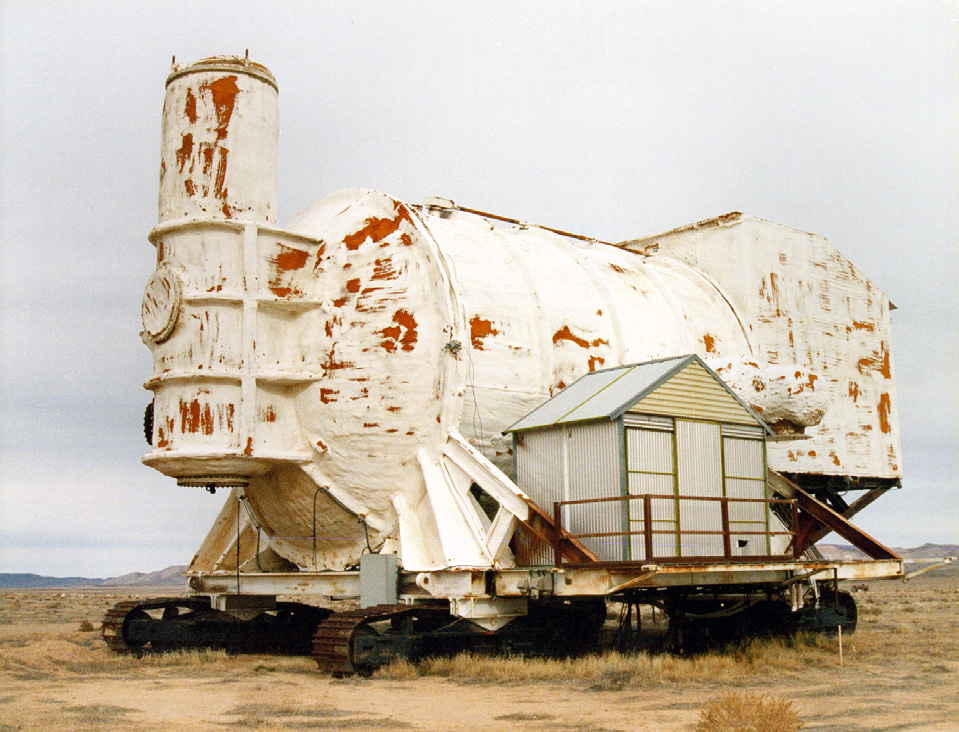
- Huron King test chamber

Information
- Country: United States
- Test site: NTS Area 19, 20, Pahute Mesa; NTS, Areas 1–4, 6–10, Yucca Flat
- Period: 1979–1980
- Number of tests: 14
- Test type: underground shaft
- Max. yield: 140 kilotonnes of TNT (590 TJ)

Test series chronology

Operation Tinderbox was a series of 14 nuclear tests conducted by the United States in 1979–1980 at the Nevada Test Site. These tests followed the Operation Quicksilver series and preceded the Operation Guardian series.

== List of the nuclear tests ==
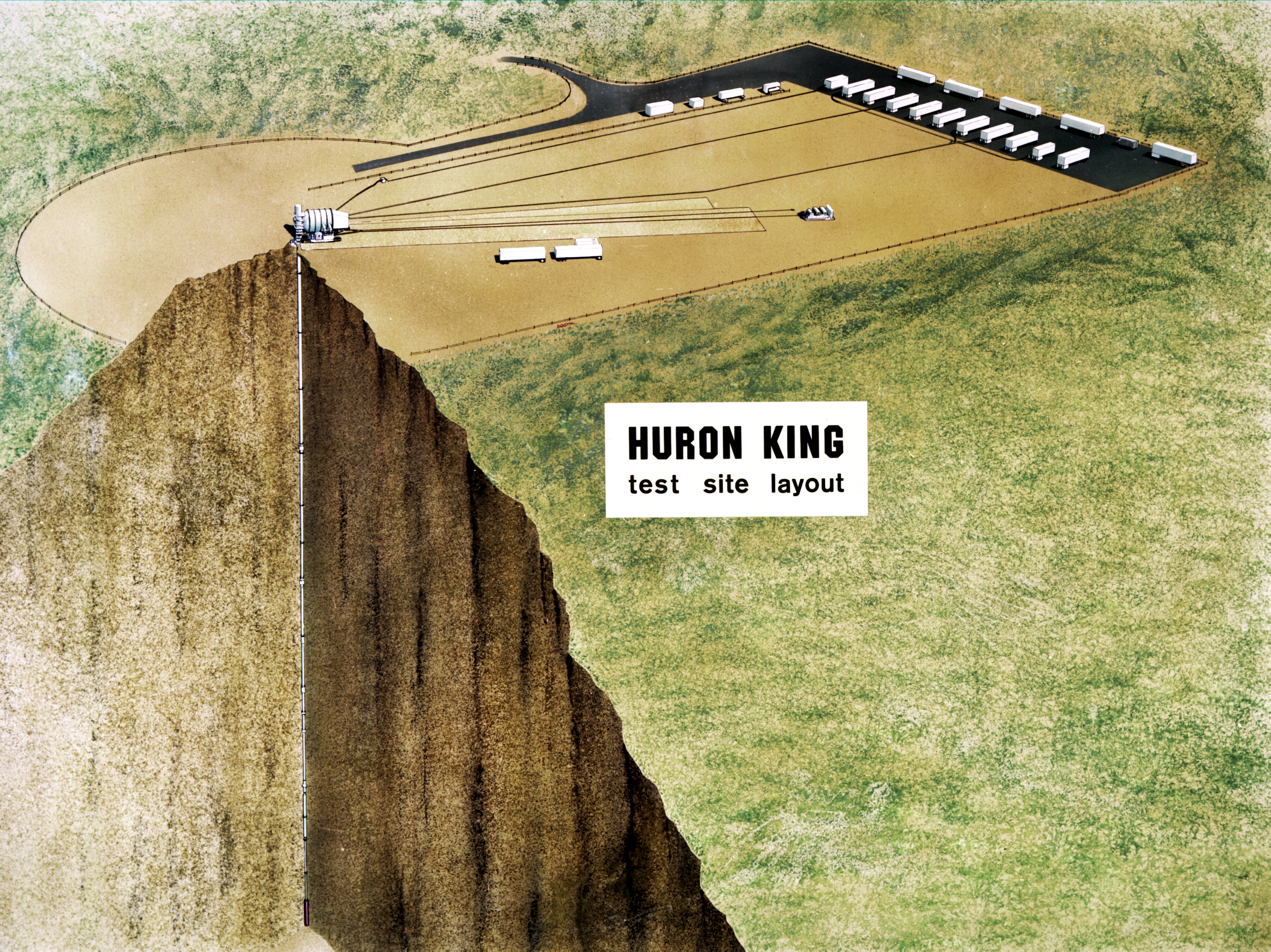
Diagram of Huron King

United States' Tinderbox series tests and detonations
Name (Note: The US, France and Great Britain have code-named their test events, while the USSR and China did not, and therefore have only test numbers (with some exceptions – Soviet peaceful explosions were named). Word translations into English in parentheses unless the name is a proper noun. A dash followed by a number indicates a member of a salvo event. The US also sometimes named the individual explosions in such a salvo test, which results in "name1 – 1(with name2)". If test is canceled or aborted, then the row data like date and location discloses the intended plans, where known.)	Date time (UT)	Local time zone (Note: To convert the UT time into standard local, add the number of hours in parentheses to the UT time; for local daylight saving time, add one additional hour. If the result is earlier than 00:00, add 24 hours and subtract 1 from the day; if it is 24:00 or later, subtract 24 hours and add 1 to the day. v)	Location (Note: Rough place name and a latitude/longitude reference; for rocket-carried tests, the launch location is specified before the detonation location, if known. Some locations are extremely accurate; others (like airdrops and space blasts) may be quite inaccurate. "~" indicates a likely pro-forma rough location, shared with other tests in that same area.)	Elevation + height (Note: Elevation is the ground level at the point directly below the explosion relative to sea level; height is the additional distance added or subtracted by tower, balloon, shaft, tunnel, air drop or other contrivance. For rocket bursts the ground level is "N/A". In some cases it is not clear if the height is absolute or relative to ground, for example, Plumbbob/John. No number or units indicates the value is unknown, while "0" means zero. Sorting on this column is by elevation and height added together.)	Delivery (Note: Atmospheric, airdrop, balloon, gun, cruise missile, rocket, surface, tower, and barge are all disallowed by the Partial Nuclear Test Ban Treaty. Sealed shaft and tunnel are underground, and remained useful under the PTBT. Intentional cratering tests are borderline; they occurred under the treaty, were sometimes protested, and generally overlooked if the test was declared to be a peaceful use.) Purpose (Note: Include weapons development, weapon effects, safety test, transport safety test, war, science, joint verification and industrial/peaceful, which may be further broken down.)	Device (Note: Designations for test items where known, "?" indicates some uncertainty about the preceding value, nicknames for particular devices in quotes. This category of information is often not officially disclosed.)	Yield (Note: Estimated energy yield in tons, kilotons, and megatons. A ton of TNT equivalent is defined as 4.184 gigajoules (1 gigacalorie).)	Fallout (Note: Radioactive emission to the atmosphere aside from prompt neutrons, where known. The measured species is only iodine-131 if mentioned, otherwise it is all species. No entry means unknown, probably none if underground and "all" if not; otherwise notation for whether measured on the site only or off the site, where known, and the measured amount of radioactivity released.)	References	Notes
Backgammon	November 29, 1979 15:00:00.096	PST (–8 hrs)	NTS Area U3jh 36.99395°N 116.02484°W	1,175 m (3,855 ft) – 228.72 m (750.4 ft)	underground shaft, weapons development		800 t			
Azul	December 14, 1979 18:00:00.09	PST (–8 hrs)	NTS Area U2em 37.13732°N 116.06394°W	1,275 m (4,183 ft) – 205 m (673 ft)	underground shaft, weapons development		less than 20 kt			Destroyed the Anvil/Peninsula device that was damaged during placement.
Tarko	February 28, 1980 15:00:00.093	PST (–8 hrs)	NTS Area U2fd 37.12655°N 116.08946°W	1,280 m (4,200 ft) – 369 m (1,211 ft)	underground shaft, weapons development		5 kt	Venting detected, 50 Ci (1,800 GBq)		
Norbo	March 8, 1980 15:35:00.09	PST (–8 hrs)	NTS Area U8c 37.17989°N 116.08399°W	1,349 m (4,426 ft) – 271 m (889 ft)	underground shaft, weapons development		1 kt	I-131 venting detected, 0		
Liptauer	April 3, 1980 14:00:00.089	PST (–8 hrs)	NTS Area U2eh 37.14983°N 116.08313°W	1,304 m (4,278 ft) – 417 m (1,368 ft)	underground shaft, weapons development		20 kt			
Pyramid	April 16, 1980 20:00:00.089	PST (–8 hrs)	NTS Area U7be 37.10107°N 116.0314°W	1,266 m (4,154 ft) – 579.1 m (1,900 ft)	underground shaft, weapons development		89 kt			
Canfield	May 2, 1980 18:46:30.092	PST (–8 hrs)	NTS Area U3kx 37.05598°N 116.0197°W	1,211 m (3,973 ft) – 350.5 m (1,150 ft)	underground shaft, weapons development		6 kt			
Flora	May 22, 1980 13:00:00.089	PST (–8 hrs)	NTS Area U3lg 37.00304°N 116.03214°W	1,179 m (3,868 ft) – 335.6 m (1,101 ft)	underground shaft, weapons development		less than 20 kt	Venting detected, 1 kCi (37 TBq)		
Kash	June 12, 1980 17:15:00.09	PST (–8 hrs)	NTS Area U20af 37.2816°N 116.45474°W	1,911 m (6,270 ft) – 645 m (2,116 ft)	underground shaft, weapons development		140 kt	Venting detected		
Huron King	June 24, 1980 15:10:00.07	PST (–8 hrs)	NTS Area U3ky 37.02328°N 116.03491°W	1,187 m (3,894 ft) – 320.04 m (1,050.0 ft)	underground shaft, weapon effect		6 kt			Radiation and EMP effects shot through a mockup DSCS satellite on the surface, which was then towed off the collapsing cap. Picture of the test chamber. It is still on the NE lip of the test's crater.
Tafi	July 25, 1980 19:05:00.082	PST (–8 hrs)	NTS Area U20ae 37.25627°N 116.47829°W	1,859 m (6,099 ft) – 680 m (2,230 ft)	underground shaft, weapons development		140 kt	Venting detected		
Verdello	July 31, 1980 18:19:00.092	PST (–8 hrs)	NTS Area U3ku 37.013°N 116.02361°W	1,183 m (3,881 ft) – 365.76 m (1,200.0 ft)	underground shaft, weapons development		3.5 kt	Venting detected, 45 Ci (1,700 GBq)		
Bonarda	September 25, 1980 14:45:00.094	PST (–8 hrs)	NTS Area U3gv 37.05609°N 116.0489°W	1,209 m (3,967 ft) – 381 m (1,250 ft)	underground shaft, weapons development		20 kt			
Riola	September 25, 1980 15:26:30.084	PST (–8 hrs)	NTS Area U2eq 37.11684°N 116.0659°W	1,254 m (4,114 ft) – 424 m (1,391 ft)	underground shaft, weapons development		1.1 kt	Venting detected off site, 2.2 kCi (81 TBq)		
