= Underground nuclear weapons testing =

Test detonation of nuclear weapons underground

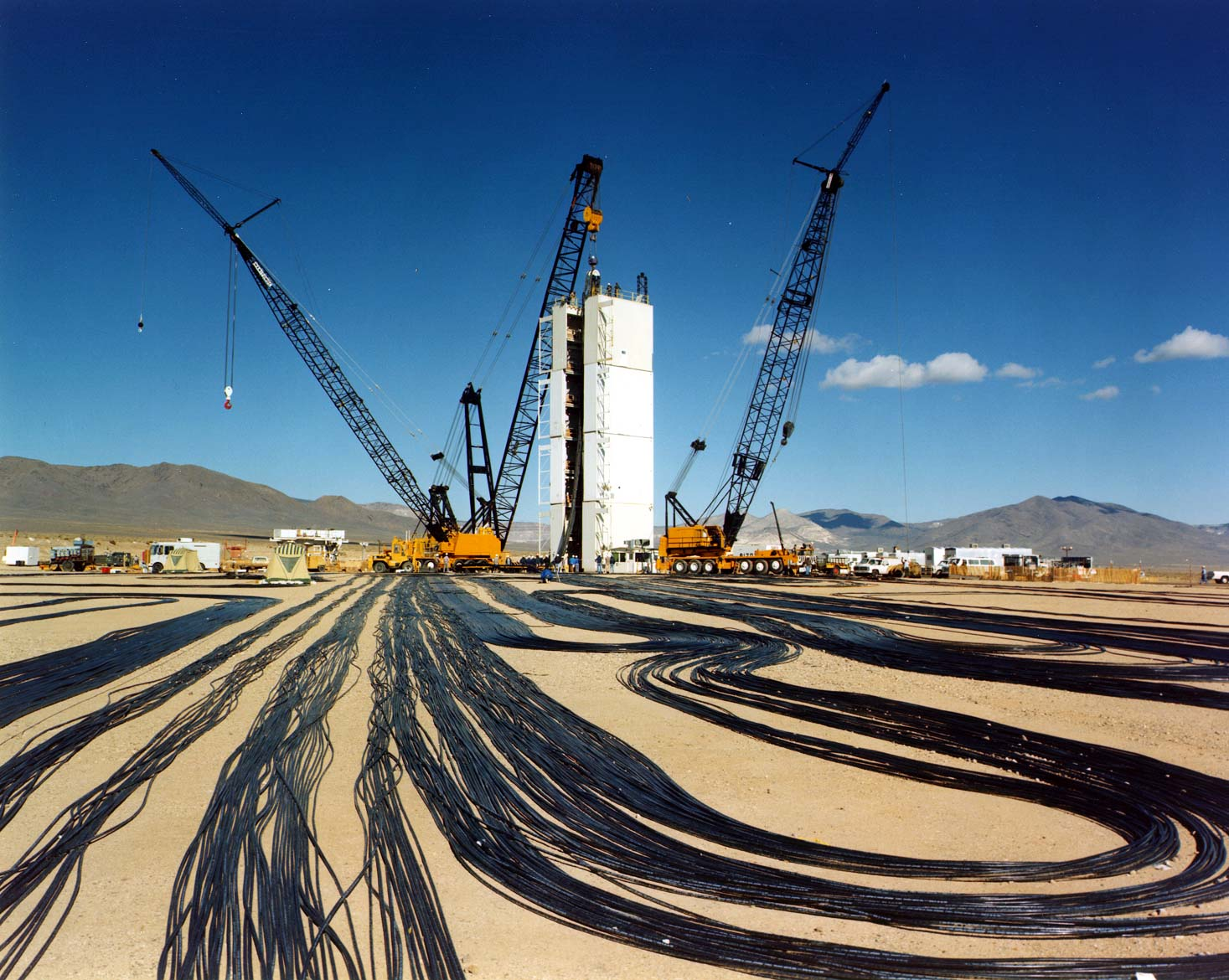
Preparation for an underground nuclear test at the Nevada Test Site in the 1990s as the diagnostic cables are being installed.

Underground nuclear testing is the test detonation of nuclear weapons that is performed underground. When the device being tested is buried at sufficient depth, the nuclear explosion may be contained, with no release of radioactive materials to the atmosphere.

The extreme heat and pressure of an underground nuclear explosion cause changes in the surrounding rock. The rock closest to the location of the test is vaporised, forming a cavity. Farther away, there are zones of crushed, cracked, and irreversibly strained rock. Following the explosion, the rock above the cavity may collapse, forming a rubble chimney. If this chimney reaches the surface, a bowl-shaped subsidence crater may form.

The first underground test took place in 1951. Further tests soon led scientists to conclude that even notwithstanding environmental and diplomatic considerations, underground testing was of far greater scientific value than all other forms of testing. This understanding strongly influenced the governments of the first three nuclear powers to sign the Limited Test Ban Treaty in 1963, which banned all nuclear tests except for those performed underground. From then until the signing of the Comprehensive Nuclear-Test-Ban Treaty in 1996, most nuclear tests were performed underground, which prevented additional nuclear fallout from entering into the atmosphere.

== Background ==
Public concern about fallout from nuclear testing grew in the early 1950s. Fallout was discovered after the Trinity test, the first ever atomic bomb test, in 1945. Photographic film manufacturers later reported 'fogged' films; this was traced to packaging materials sourced from Indiana crops, contaminated by Trinity and later tests at the Nevada Test Site, over 1,000 miles (1,600 km) away. Intense fallout from the 1953 Simon test was documented as far as Albany, New York.

The fallout from the March 1954 Bravo test in the Pacific Ocean had "scientific, political and social implications that have continued for more than 40 years". The multi-megaton test caused fallout to occur on the islands of the Rongerik and Rongelap atolls, and a Japanese fishing boat known as the Daigo Fukuryū Maru (Lucky Dragon). Prior to this test, there was "insufficient" appreciation of the dangers of fallout.

The test became an international incident. In a Public Broadcasting Service (PBS) interview, the historian Martha Smith argued: "In Japan, it becomes a huge issue in terms of not just the government and its protest against the United States, but all different groups and all different peoples in Japan start to protest. It becomes a big issue in the media. There are all kinds of letters and protests that come from, not surprisingly, Japanese fishermen, the fishermen's wives; there are student groups, all different types of people; that protest against the Americans' use of the Pacific for nuclear testing. They're very concerned about, first of all, why the United States even has the right to be carrying out those kinds of tests in the Pacific. They're also concerned about the health and environmental impact."

Knowledge about fallout and its effects grew, and with it concern about the global environment and long-term genetic damage. Talks between the United States, the United Kingdom, Canada, France, and the Soviet Union began in May 1955 on the subject of an international agreement to end nuclear tests. On August 5, 1963, representatives of the United States, the Soviet Union, and the United Kingdom signed the Limited Test Ban Treaty, forbidding testing of nuclear weapons in the atmosphere, in space, and underwater. Agreement was facilitated by the decision to allow underground testing, eliminating the need for on-site inspections that concerned the Soviets. Underground testing was allowed, provided that it does not cause "radioactive debris to be present outside the territorial limits of the State under whose jurisdiction or control such explosion is conducted".

== Early history of underground testing ==
Following analysis of underwater detonations that were part of Operation Crossroads in 1946, inquiries were made regarding the possible military value of an underground explosion. The US Joint Chiefs of Staff thus obtained the agreement of the United States Atomic Energy Commission (AEC) to perform experiments on both surface and sub-surface detonations. The Alaskan island of Amchitka was initially selected for these tests in 1950, but the site was later deemed unsuitable and the tests were moved to the Nevada Test Site.

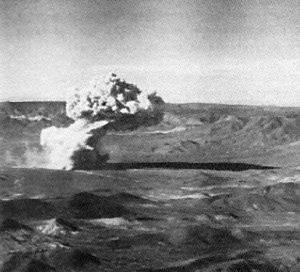
Buster-Jangle Uncle, the first underground nuclear explosion

The first underground nuclear test was conducted on 29 November 1951. This was the 1.2 kiloton Buster-Jangle Uncle, which detonated 17 ft (5.2 m) beneath ground level. The test was designed as a scaled-down investigation of the effects of a 23-kiloton ground-penetrating gun-type fission weapon that was then being considered for use as a cratering and bunker-buster weapon. The explosion resulted in a cloud that rose to 11,500 ft (3,500 m), and deposited fallout to the north and north-northeast. The resulting crater was 260 ft (79 m) wide and 53 ft (16 m) deep.

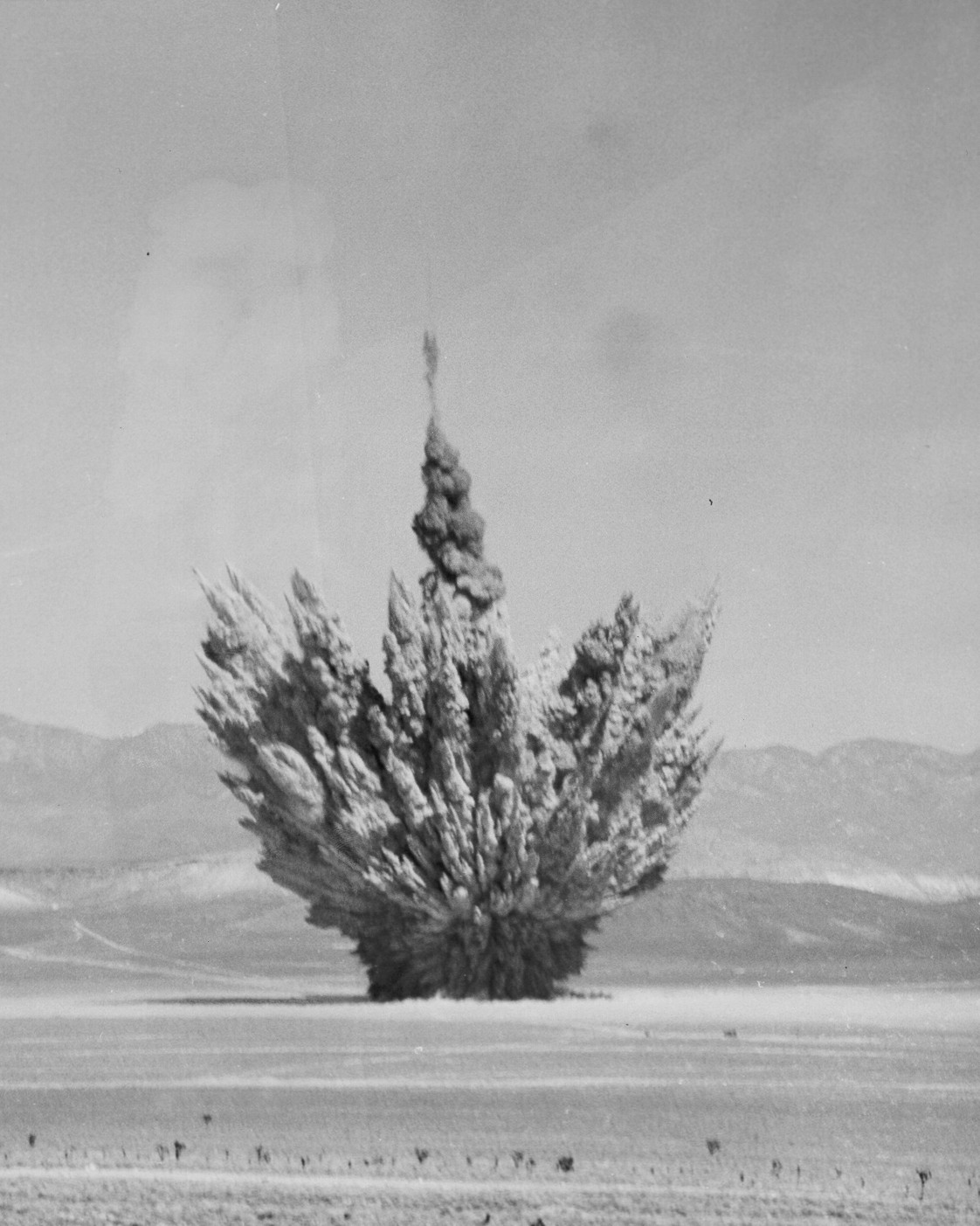
Teapot Ess

The next underground test was Teapot Ess, on 23 March 1955. The one-kiloton explosion was an operational test of an 'Atomic Demolition Munition' (ADM). It was detonated 67 ft (20 m) underground, in a shaft lined with corrugated steel, which was then back-filled with sandbags and dirt. Because the ADM was buried underground, the explosion blew tons of earth upwards, creating a crater 300 ft (90 m) wide and 128 ft (39 m) deep. The resulting mushroom cloud rose to a height of 12,000 ft (3,700 m) and subsequent radioactive fallout drifted in an easterly direction, travelling as far as 140 mi (225 km) from ground zero.

On 26 July 1957, Plumbbob Pascal-A was detonated at the bottom of a 486 ft (148 m) shaft. According to one description, it "ushered in the era of underground testing with a magnificent pyrotechnic roman candle!" As compared with an above-ground test, the radioactive debris released to the atmosphere was reduced by a factor of ten. Theoretical work began on possible containment schemes.

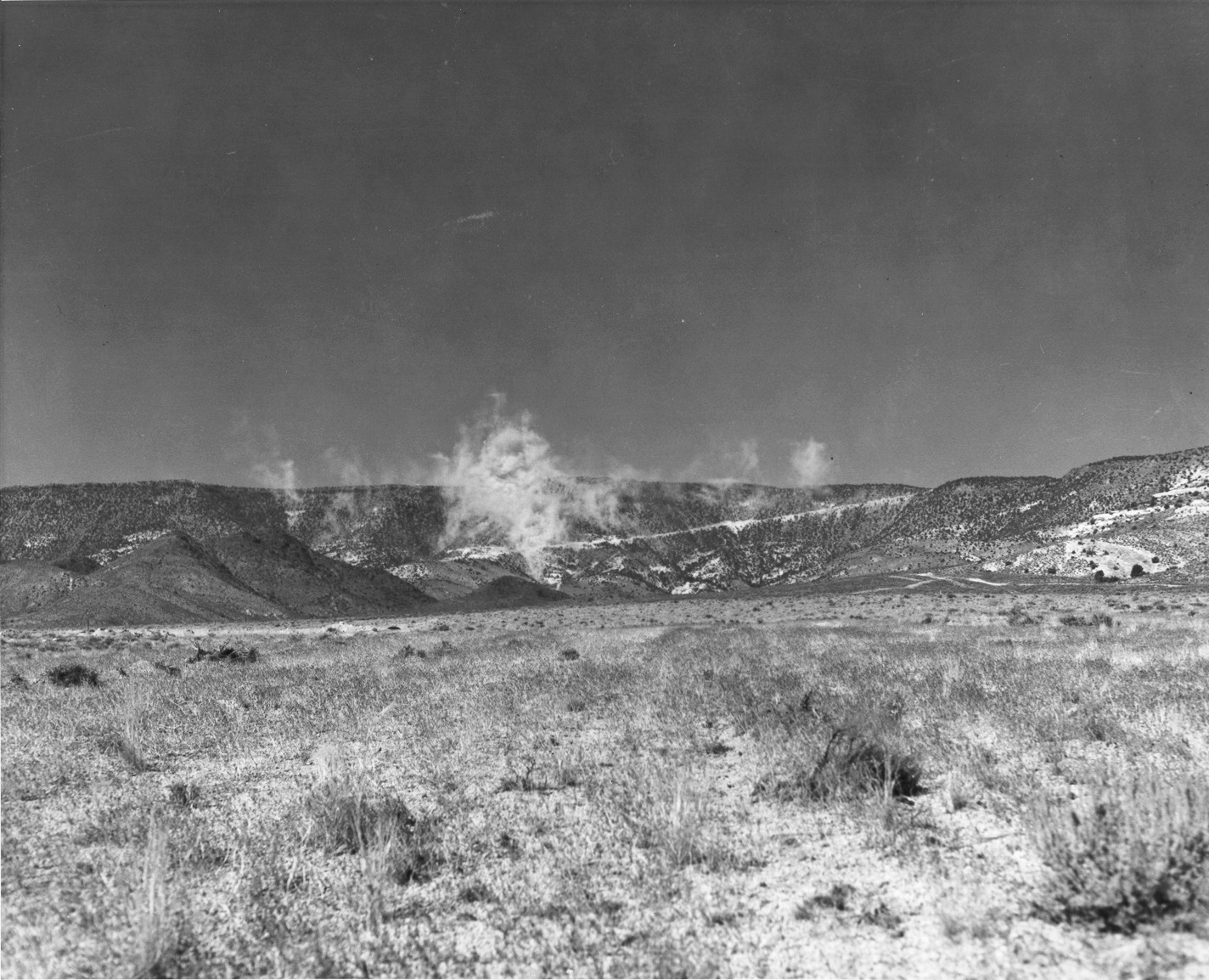
Dust raised by Plumbbob Rainier

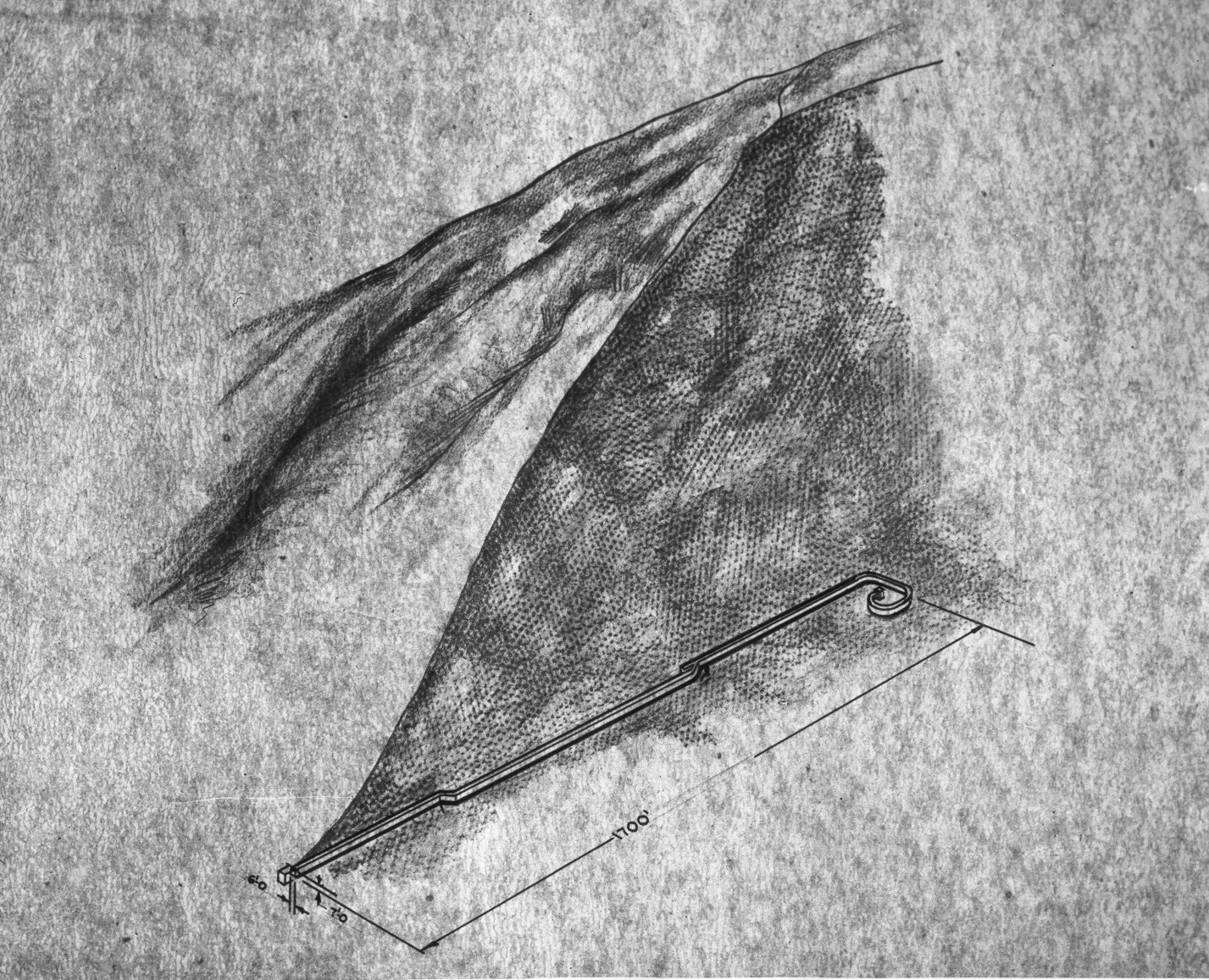
Layout of the Plumbbob Rainier tunnel

Plumbbob Rainier was detonated at 899 ft (274 m) underground on 19 September 1957. The 1.7 kt explosion was the first to be entirely contained underground, producing no fallout. The test took place in a 1,600 to 2,000 ft (500 to 600 m) horizontal tunnel in the shape of a hook. The hook "was designed so explosive force will seal off the non-curved portion of tunnel nearest the detonation before gases and fission fragments can be vented around the curve of the tunnel's hook". This test would become the prototype for larger, more powerful tests. Rainier was announced in advance, so that seismic stations could attempt to record a signal.

Analysis of samples collected after the test enabled scientists to develop an understanding of underground explosions that "persists essentially unaltered today". The information would later provide a basis for subsequent decisions to agree to the Limited Test Ban Treaty.

Cannikin, the last test at the facility on Amchitka, was detonated on 6 November 1971. At approximately five megatons, it was the largest underground test in US history.

== Effects ==
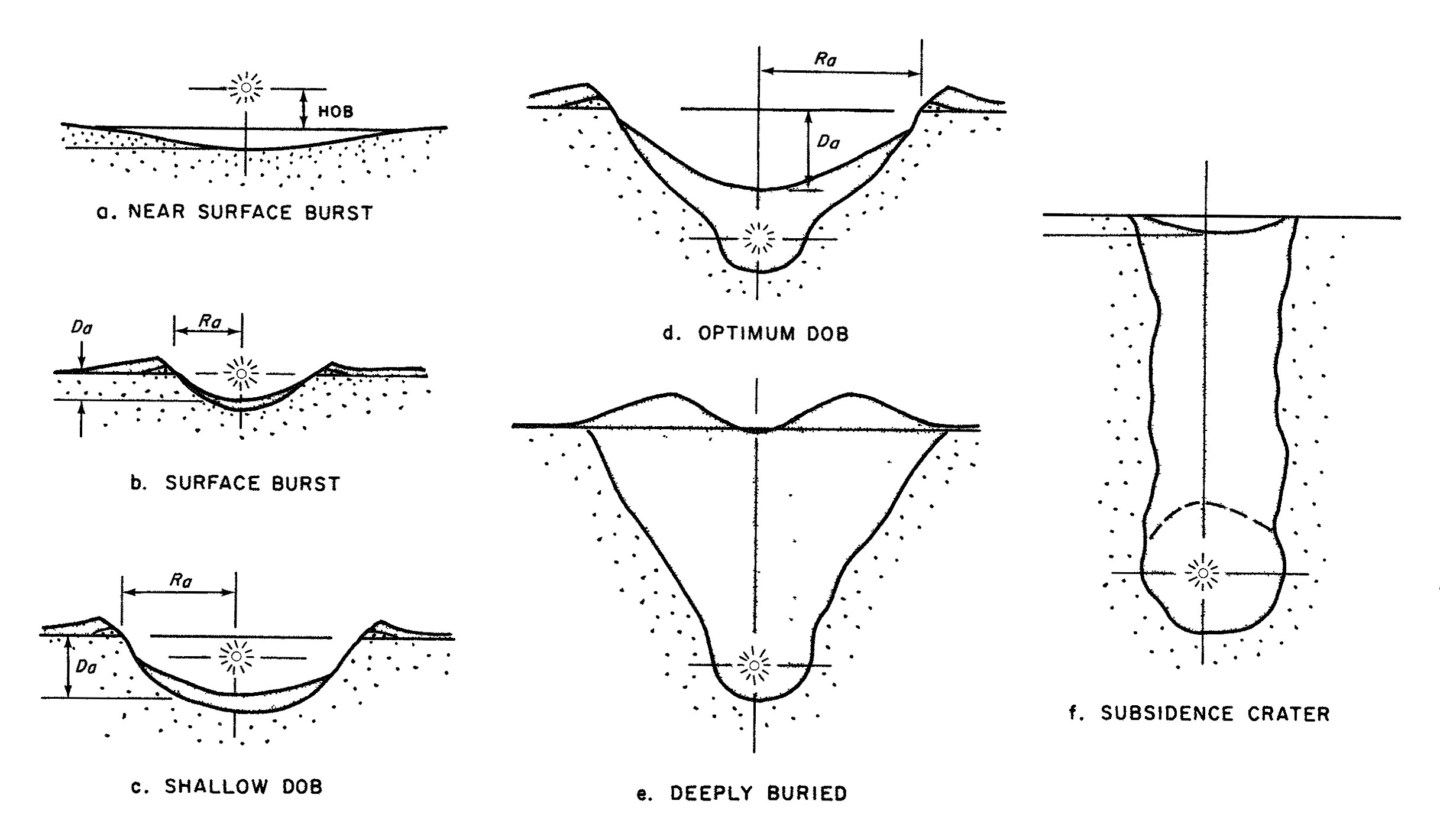
Relative crater sizes and shapes resulting from various burst depths

The effects of an underground nuclear test may vary according to factors including the depth and yield of the explosion, as well as the nature of the surrounding rock. If the test is conducted at sufficient depth, the test is said to be contained, with no venting of gases or other contaminants to the environment. In contrast, if the device is buried at insufficient depth ("underburied"), then rock may be expelled by the explosion, forming a subsidence crater surrounded by ejecta, and releasing high-pressure gases to the atmosphere (the resulting crater is usually conical in profile, circular, and may range between tens to hundreds of yards in diameter and depth).

One figure used in determining how deeply the device should be buried is the scaled depth of burial, or -burst (SDOB) This figure is calculated as the burial depth divided by the cube root of the yield. It is estimated that, in order to ensure containment, this figure should be greater than 300 ft (100 m) per kiloton^{1/3}.

Zones in surrounding rock
| Name | Radius |
|---|---|
| Melt cavity | 10–40 ft (4–12 m) per kt^{1/3} |
| Crushed zone | 100–130 ft (30–40 m) per kt^{1/3} |
| Cracked zone | 260–390 ft (80–120 m) per kt^{1/3} |
| Zone of irreversible strain | 2,600–3,600 ft (800–1,100 m) per kt^{1/3} |

The energy of the nuclear explosion is released in one microsecond. In the following few microseconds, the test hardware and surrounding rock are vaporised, with temperatures of several million degrees and pressures of several million atmospheres. Within milliseconds, a bubble of high-pressure gas and steam is formed. The heat and expanding shock wave cause the surrounding rock to vaporise, or be melted further away, creating a melt cavity. The shock-induced motion and high internal pressure cause this cavity to expand outwards, which continues over several tenths of a second until the pressure has fallen sufficiently, to a level roughly comparable with the weight of the rock above, and can no longer grow. Although not observed in every explosion, four distinct zones (including the melt cavity) have been described in the surrounding rock. The crushed zone, about two times the radius of the cavity, consists of rock that has lost all of its former integrity. The cracked zone, about three times the cavity radius, consists of rock with radial and concentric fissures. Finally, the zone of irreversible strain consists of rock deformed by the pressure. The following layer undergoes only an elastic deformation; the strain and subsequent release then forms a seismic wave. A few seconds later the molten rock starts collecting on the bottom of the cavity and the cavity content begins cooling. The rebound after the shock wave causes compressive forces to build up around the cavity, called a stress containment cage, sealing the cracks.

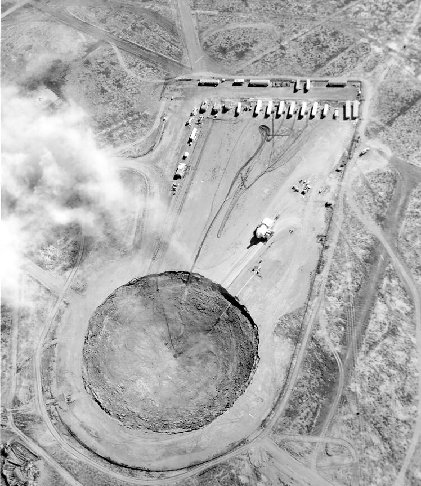
Subsidence crater formed by Huron King

Several minutes to days later, once the heat dissipates enough, the steam condenses, and the pressure in the cavity falls below the level needed to support the overburden, the rock above the void falls into the cavity. Depending on various factors, including the yield and characteristics of the burial, this collapse may extend to the surface. If it does, a subsidence crater is created. Such a crater is usually bowl-shaped, and ranges in size from around 100 feet to over half a mile in diameter. At the Nevada Test Site, 95 percent of tests conducted at a scaled depth of burial (SDOB) of less than 150 caused surface collapse, compared with about half of tests conducted at a SDOB of less than 180. The radius r (in feet) of the cavity is proportional to the cube root of the yield y (in kilotons), r = 55 * $\sqrt[3]{y}$; an 8 kiloton explosion will create a cavity with radius of 110 feet (34 m).

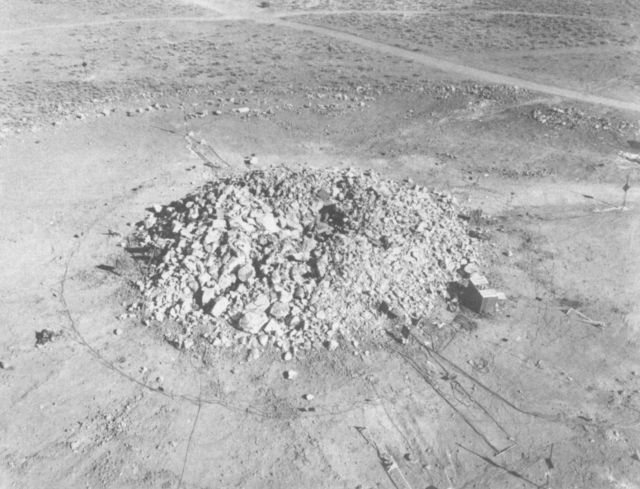
Rubble mound formed by Whetstone Sulky

Other surface features may include disturbed ground, pressure ridges, faults, water movement (including changes to the water table level), rockfalls, and ground slump. Most of the gas in the cavity is composed of steam; its volume decreases dramatically as the temperature falls and the steam condenses. There are however other gases, mostly carbon dioxide and hydrogen, which do not condense and remain gaseous. The carbon dioxide is produced by thermal decomposition of carbonates, hydrogen is created by reaction of iron and other metals from the nuclear device and surrounding equipment. The amount of carbonates and water in the soil and the available iron have to be considered in evaluating the test site containment; water-saturated clay soils may cause structural collapse and venting. Hard basement rock may reflect shock waves of the explosion, also possibly causing structural weakening and venting. The noncondensible gases may stay absorbed in the pores in the soil. Large amount of such gases can however maintain enough pressure to drive the fission products to the ground.

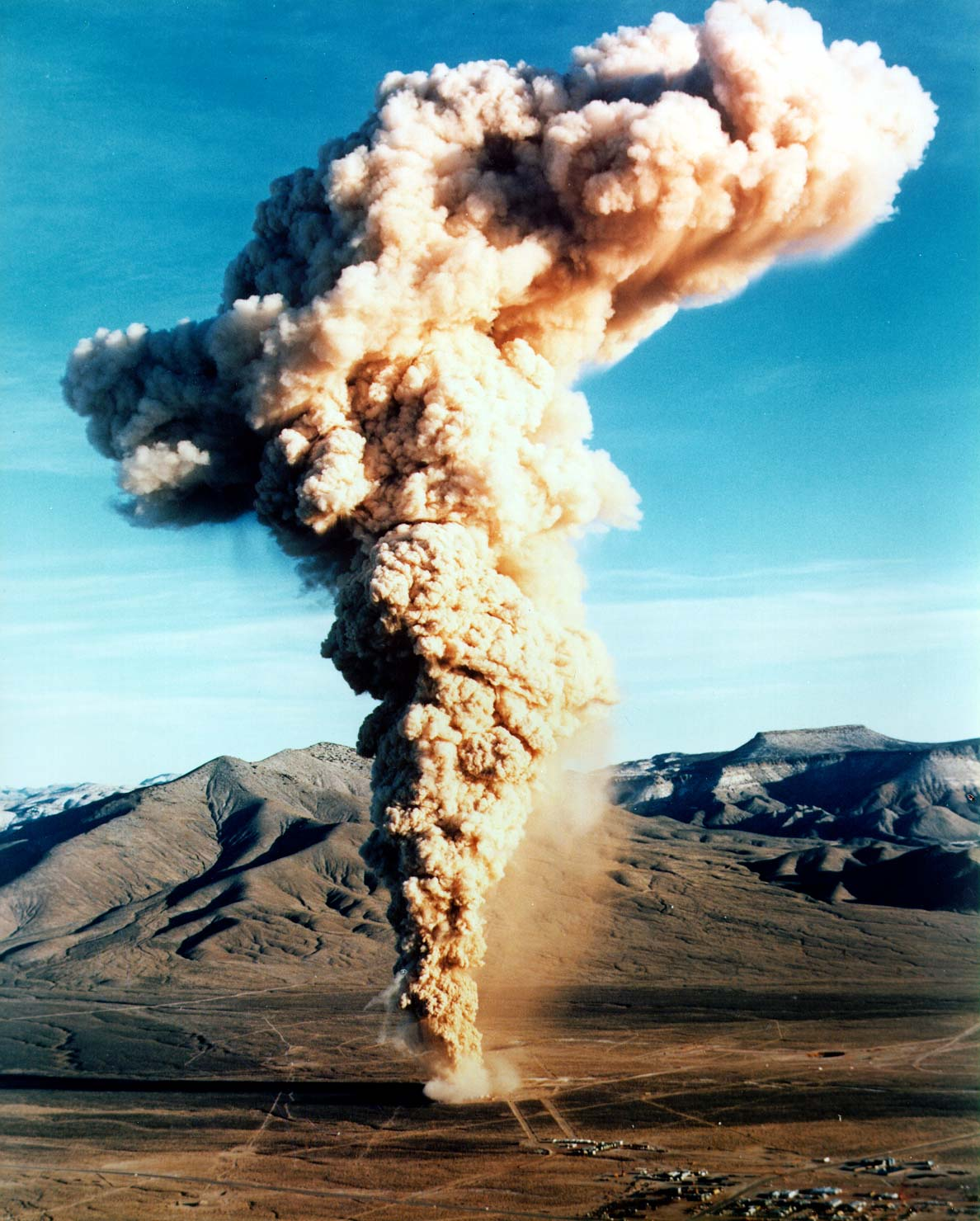
Radioactivity release during Baneberry

Escape of radioactivity from the cavity is known as containment failure. Massive, prompt, uncontrolled releases of fission products, driven by the pressure of steam or gas, are known as venting; an example of such failure is the Baneberry test. Slow, low-pressure uncontrolled releases of radioactivity are known as seeps; these have little to no energy, are not visible and have to be detected by instruments. Late-time seeps are releases of noncondensable gases days or weeks after the blast, by diffusion through pores and crack, probably assisted by a decrease of atmospheric pressure (so called atmospheric pumping). When the test tunnel has to be accessed, controlled tunnel purging is performed; the gases are filtered, diluted by air and released to atmosphere when the winds will disperse them over sparsely populated areas. Small activity leaks resulting from operational aspects of tests are called operational releases; they may occur e.g. during drilling into the explosion location during core sampling, or during the sampling of explosion gases. The radionuclide composition differs by the type of releases; large prompt venting releases significant fraction (up to 10%) of fission products, while late-time seeps contain only the most volatile gases. Soil absorbs the reactive chemical compounds, so the only nuclides filtered through soil into the atmosphere are the noble gases, primarily krypton-85 and xenon-133.

The released nuclides can undergo bio-accumulation. Radioactive isotopes like iodine-131, strontium-90 and caesium-137 are concentrated in the milk of grazing cows; cow milk is therefore a convenient, sensitive fallout indicator. Soft tissues of animals can be analyzed for gamma emitters, bones and liver for strontium and plutonium, and blood, urine and soft tissues are analyzed for tritium.

Although there were early concerns about earthquakes arising as a result of underground tests, there is no evidence that this has occurred. However, fault movements and ground fractures have been reported, and explosions often precede a series of aftershocks, thought to be a result of cavity collapse and chimney formation. In a few cases, seismic energy released by fault movements has exceeded that of the explosion itself.

== International treaties ==
Signed in Moscow on August 5, 1963, by representatives of the United States, the Soviet Union, and the United Kingdom, the Limited Test Ban Treaty agreed to ban nuclear testing in the atmosphere, in space, and underwater. Due to the Soviet government's concern about the need for on-site inspections, underground tests were excluded from the ban. 108 countries eventually signed the treaty, with the significant exception of China.

In 1974, the United States and the Soviet Union signed the Threshold Test Ban Treaty (TTBT) which banned underground tests with yields greater than 150 kilotons. By the 1990s, technologies to monitor and detect underground tests had matured to the point that tests of one kiloton or over could be detected with high probability, and in 1996 negotiations began under the auspices of the United Nations to develop a comprehensive test ban. The resulting Comprehensive Nuclear-Test-Ban Treaty was signed in 1996 by the United States, Russia, United Kingdom, France, and China. However, following the United States Senate decision not to ratify the treaty in 1999, it is still yet to be ratified by 8 of the required 44 'Annex 2' states and so has not entered into force as United Nations law.

=== Monitoring ===
In the late 1940s, the United States began to develop the capability to detect atmospheric testing using air sampling; this system was able to detect the first Soviet test in 1949. Over the next decade, this system was improved, and a network of seismic monitoring stations was established to detect underground tests. Development of the Threshold Test Ban Treaty in the mid-1970s led to an improved understanding of the relationship between test yield and resulting seismic magnitude.

When negotiations began in the mid-1990s to develop a comprehensive test ban, the international community was reluctant to rely upon the detection capabilities of individual nuclear weapons states (especially the United States), and instead wanted an international detection system. The resulting International Monitoring System (IMS) consists of a network of 321 monitoring stations, and 16 radionuclide laboratories. Fifty "primary" seismic stations send data continuously to the International Data Center, along with 120 "auxiliary" stations which send data on request. The resulting data is used to locate the epicentre, and distinguish between the seismic signatures of an underground nuclear explosion and an earthquake. Additionally, eighty radionuclide stations detect radioactive particles vented by underground explosions. Certain radionuclides constitute clear evidence of nuclear tests; the presence of noble gases can indicate whether an underground explosion has taken place. Finally, eleven hydroacoustic stations and sixty infrasound stations monitor underwater and atmospheric tests.

== Gallery ==
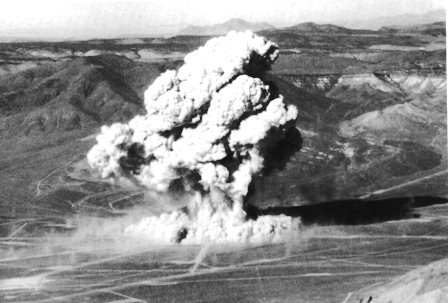
Buster-Jangle Uncle

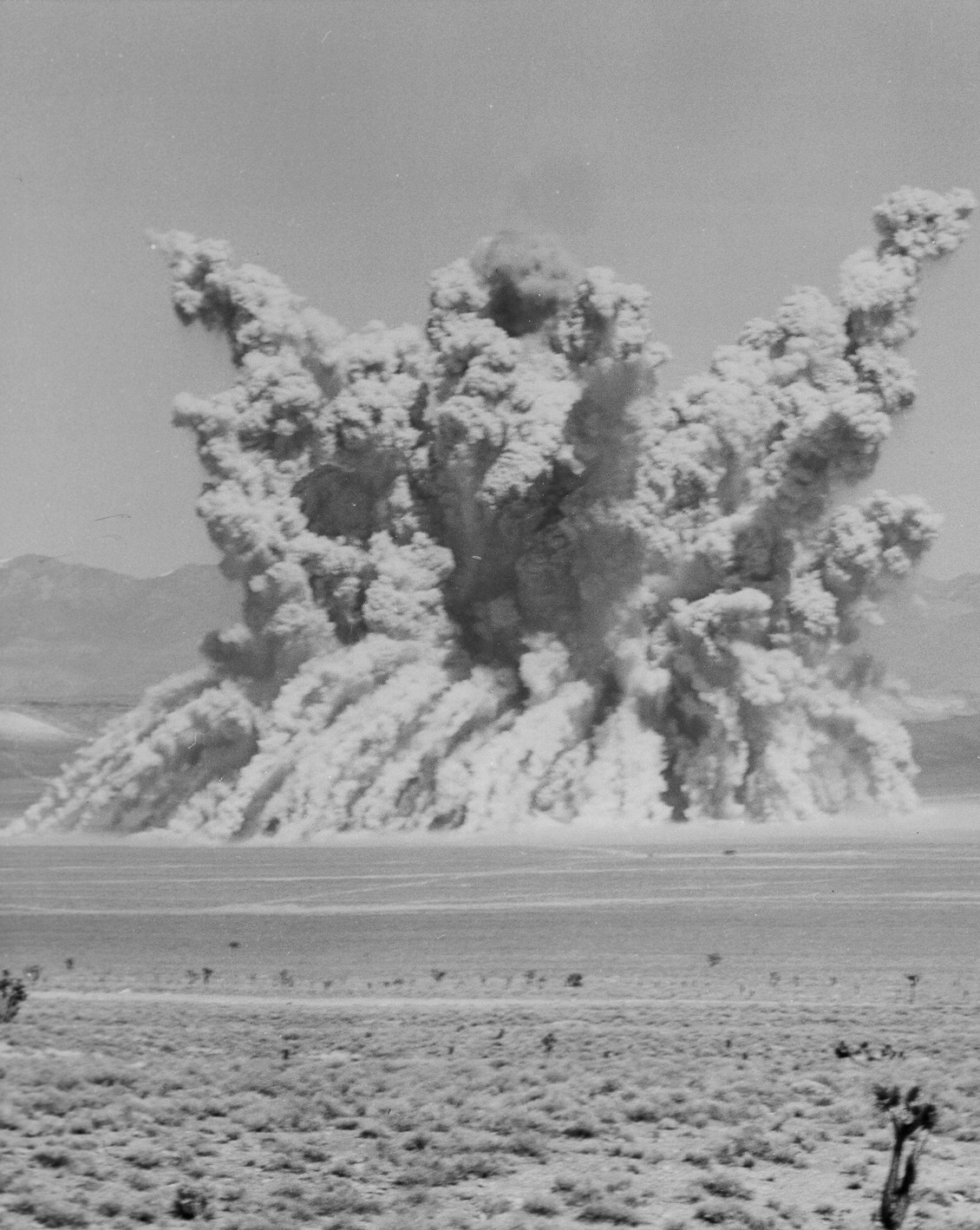
Teapot Ess

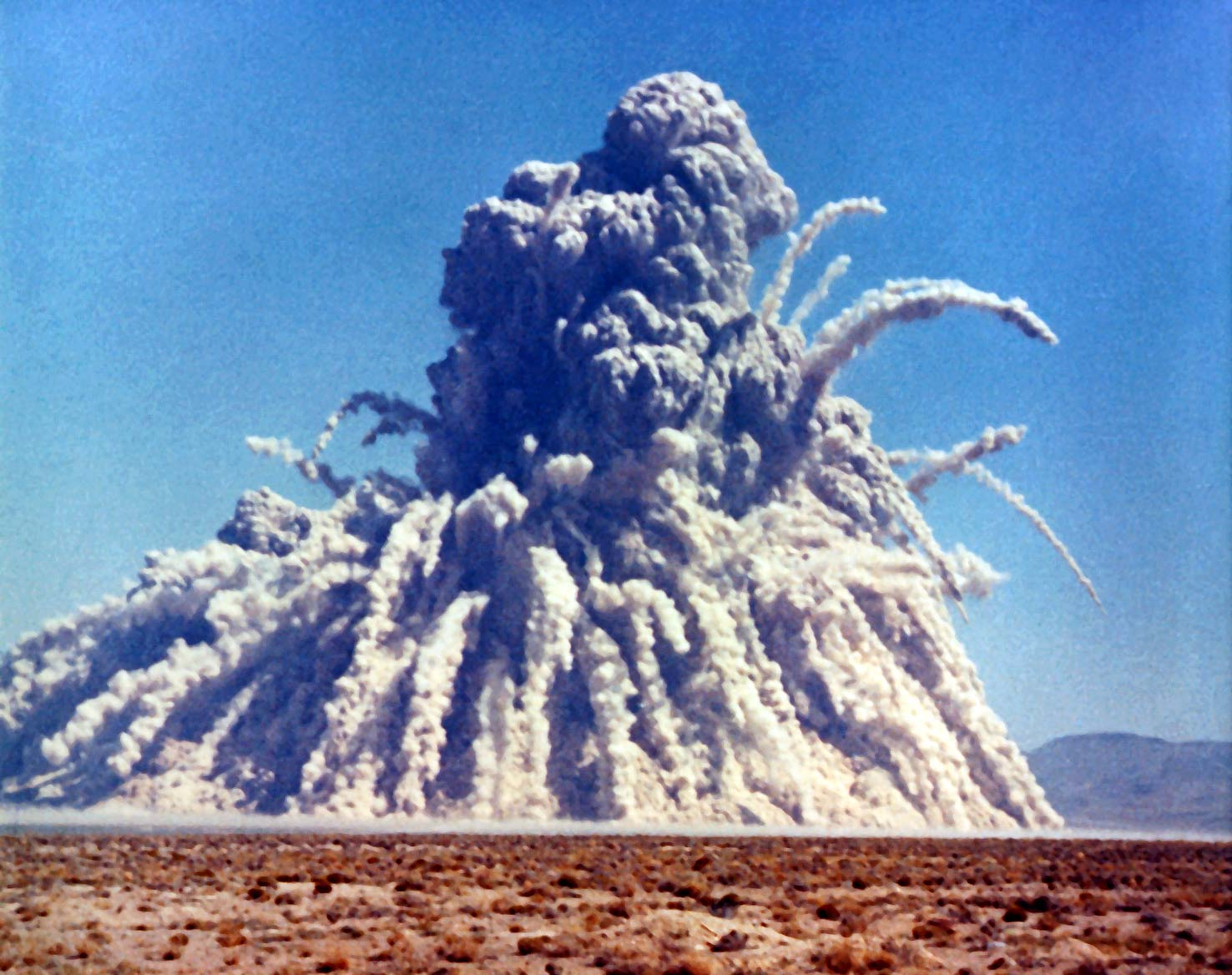
Storax Sedan

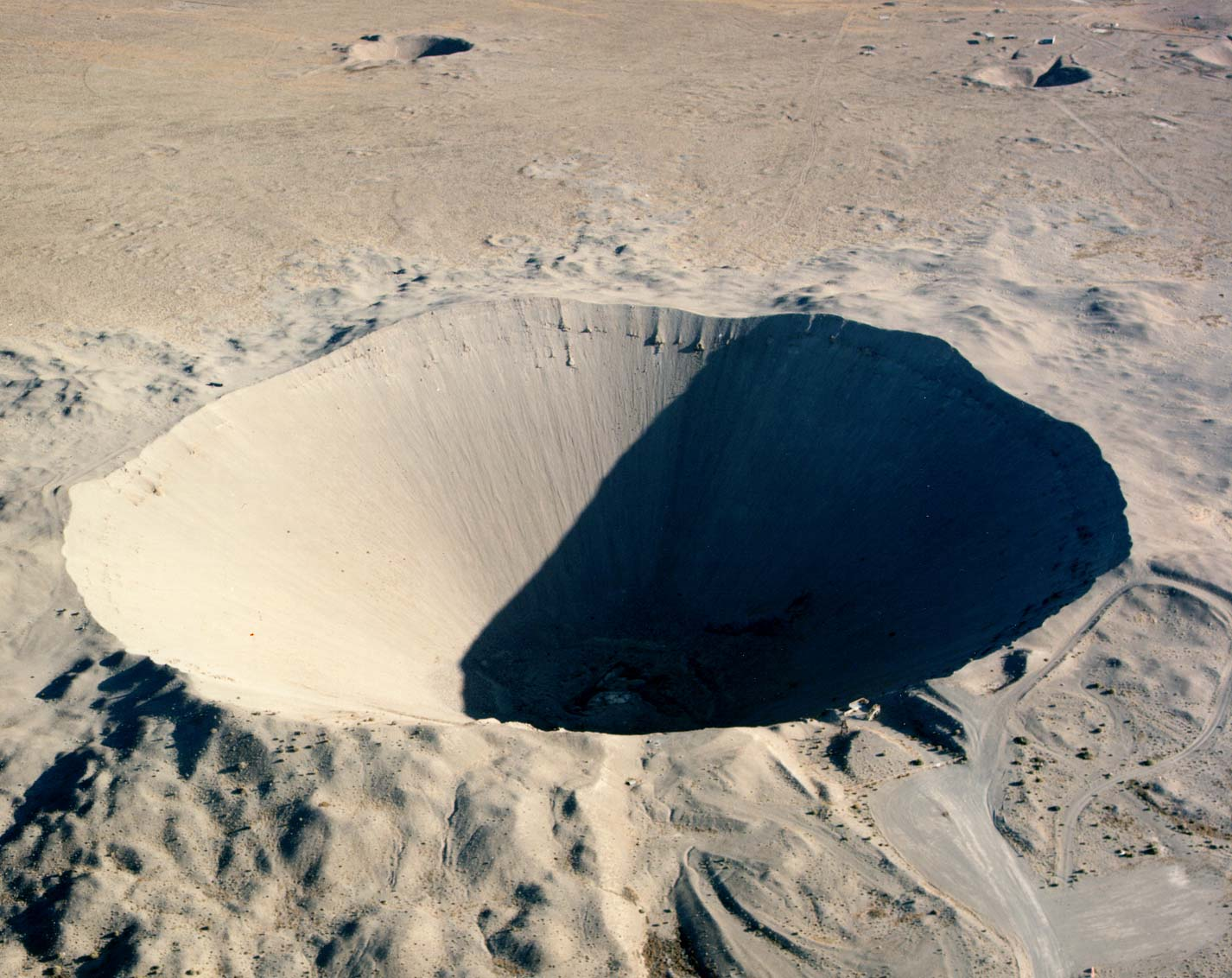
Sedan Crater

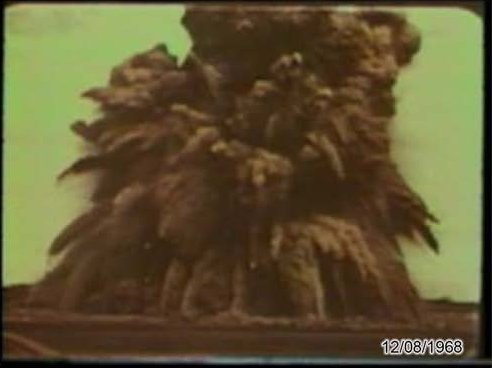
Bowline Schooner

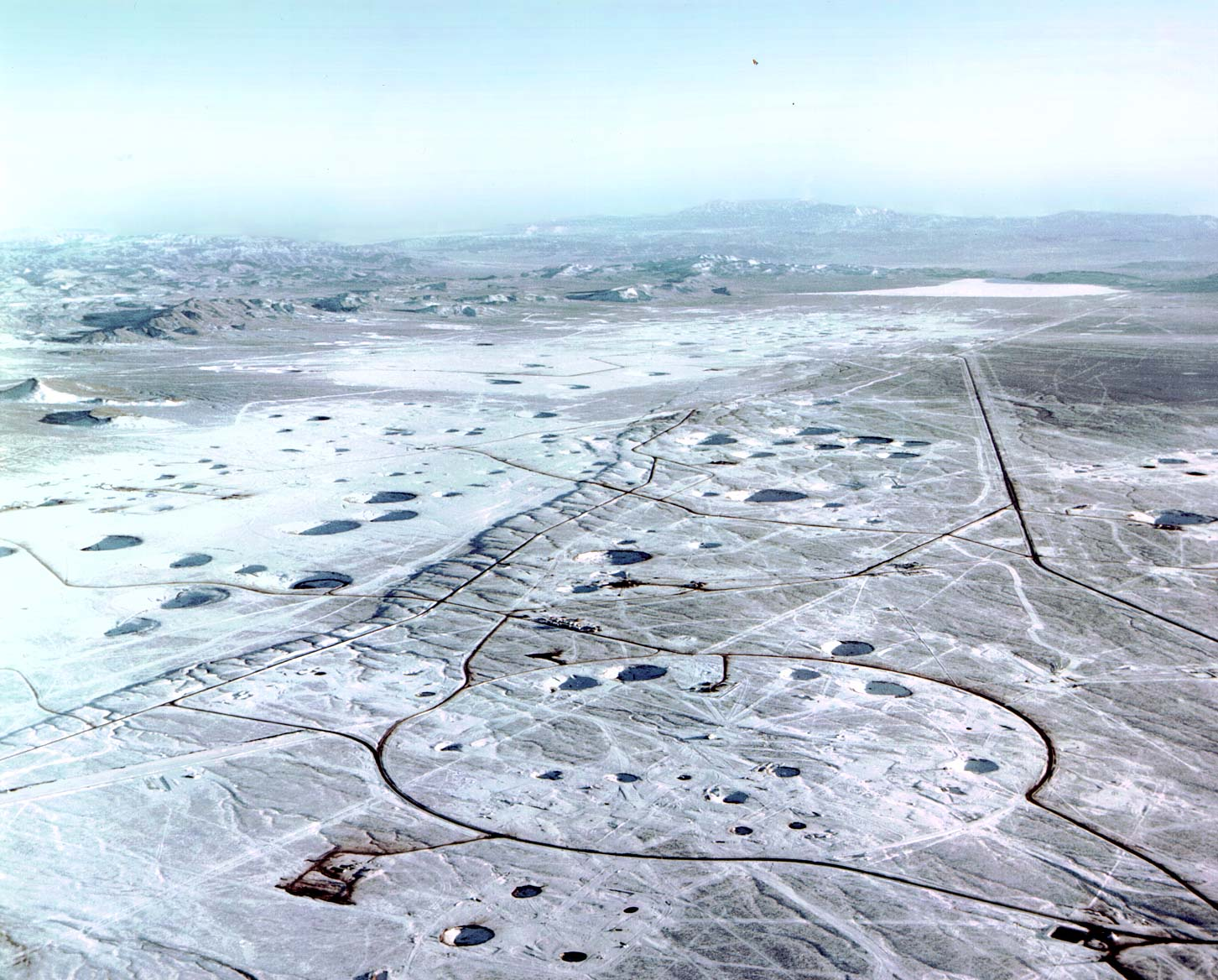
Nevada Test Site subsidence craters

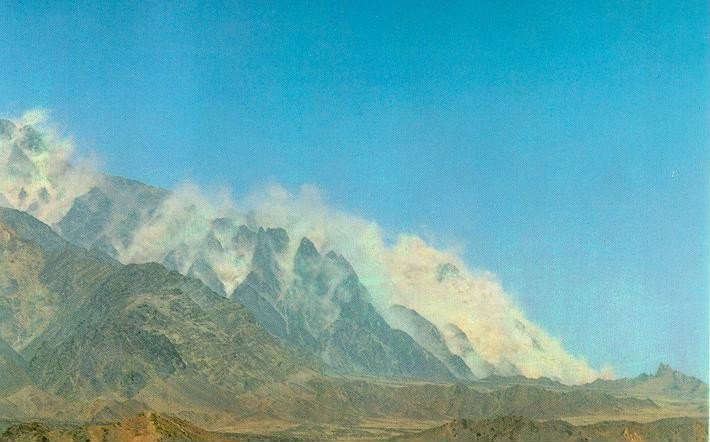
Chagai-I

== See also ==
- Nuclear weapons testing
- Subsidence crater
- Tired mountain syndrome
- Nuclear bunker buster
- List of induced seismic events
