= Save the Arctic =

Environmental campaign to protect the Arctic

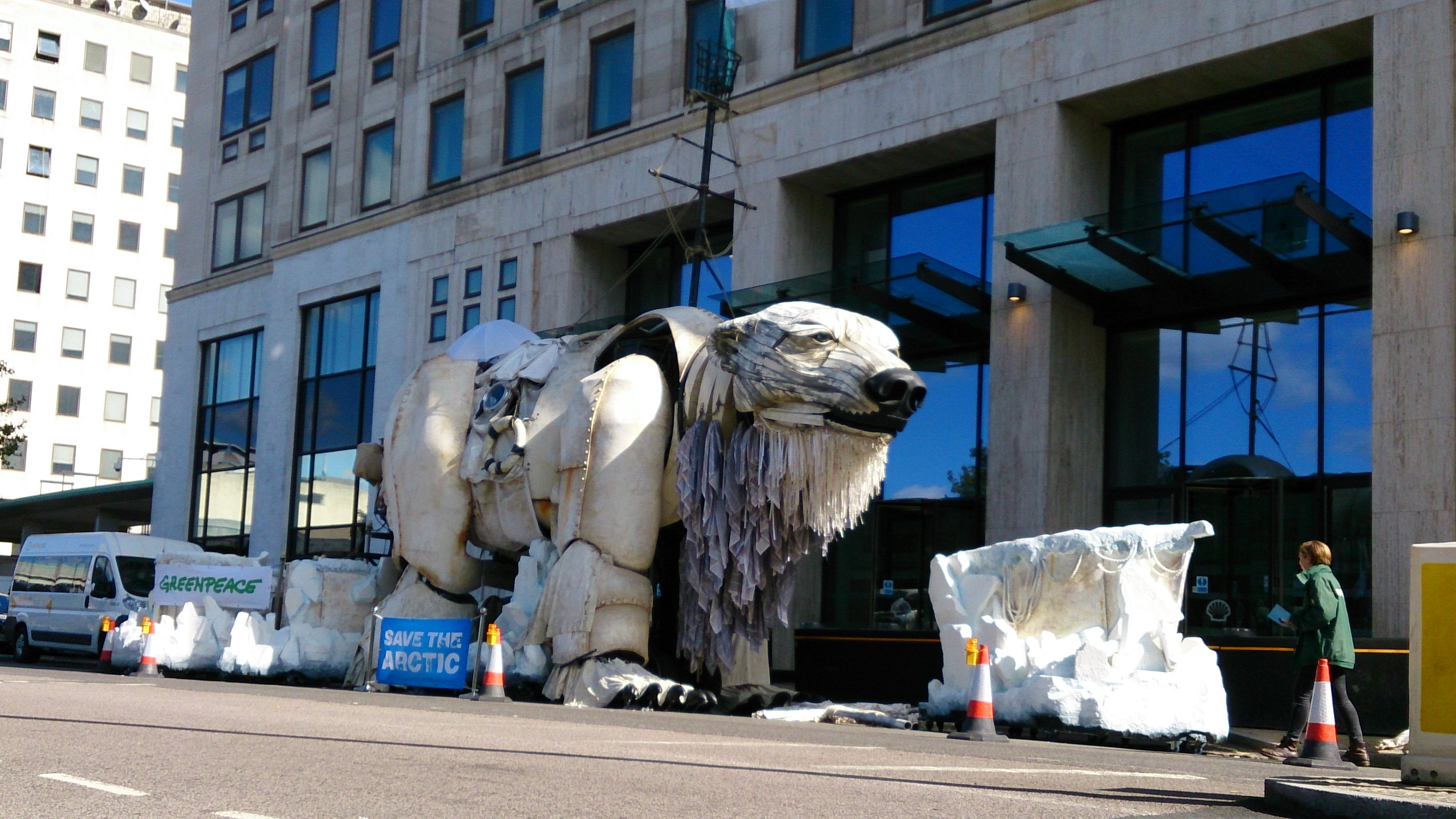
A symbolic wet frozen polar bear with live belt, in front of Shell Centre, London, during the campaign in September 2015.

Save the Arctic is a Greenpeace campaign to protect the Arctic, principally by preventing oil drilling and unsustainable industrial fishing in the area completely, surrounded by an Arctic-Environmental economics-Zone. The campaign, begun in 2012, calls for a sanctuary in the uninhabited high seas area around the North Pole, similar to the Protocol on Environmental Protection to the Antarctic Treaty. The campaign aims to begin this process by prompting a United Nations resolution on protection for the Arctic. Due to Russian invasion in Ukraine, world's 13% oil reserves could be a melting point in the Arctic.

== Background ==
The Arctic may contain around 20% of the world's remaining undiscovered oil and gas resources. As most easily extractable fossil fuel reserves have been exploited, and the Arctic ice pack shrinks, governments and oil companies have begun to look for new resources in the Arctic. Given these possible threats, in 2008 the European Parliament proposed opening negotiations on a treaty to protect the Arctic.

== Support ==
Greenpeace began the campaign aiming to take a million signatures supporting the campaign to place on the sea bed at the North Pole in April 2013. At the beginning of 2013, the petition registered over 2.5 million signatures. The petition will be accompanied on the sea bed by a flag designed by young people, in partnership with the Girl Guides and Vivienne Westwood. Paul McCartney, Robert Redford, Alejandro Sanz and Richard Branson are amongst those who support this campaign.

The World Wide Fund for Nature is running a related campaign to protect Arctic polar bear habitat, in partnership with Coca-Cola.

== Campaign ==
Oil companies exploring the Arctic, include Rosneft, Royal Dutch Shell, Gazprom, and ExxonMobil.

=== Royal Dutch Shell ===
Greenpeace and Avaaz have focused their campaigning at the beginning of 2013 on Royal Dutch Shell, including with the use of a parody website.

In 2010, in the immediate aftermath of the BP Deepwater Horizon oil spill, Greenpeace activists painted "No Arctic Drilling" with spilled BP oil on the side of a ship that Shell planned to use for oil exploration in the Arctic. At the protest, Phil Radford of Greenpeace called for "President Obama [to] ban all offshore oil drilling and call for an end to the use of oil in our cars by 2030."

In July 2014, Greenpeace launched a global boycott campaign to persuade Lego to cease producing toys carrying Shell's logo in response to the oil company's plans to drill for oil in the Arctic. Lego's partnership with Shell dates back to the 1960s, although a fictional oil company called Octan featured as the corporation headed by the villain President Business in The Lego Movie. Lego has used the Octan name since 1992 for its fictitious oil company, branding many filling stations, trucks and race cars.

=== Gazprom ===
==== Greenpeace Arctic Sunrise ship case ====
After an incident in the Kara Sea with the Russian authorities in August 2013 during a "Save-the-Arctic-banner-action", the Greenpeace-ship Arctic Sunrise again was stopped in the Pechora Sea: On Wednesday 18 September, two Greenpeace activists were arrested, protesting against Arctic oil drilling on the Gazprom platform Prirazlomnaya (de) within the exclusive economic zone. Greenpeace International told on their campaign-website, the activists "were held overnight without charges or legal representation aboard a Russian Coast Guard vessel." On September 19, the Russian Coast Guard "illegally boarded the Greenpeace-ship, while in international waters. 11 warning shots have been fired at Arctic-Sunrise, the activists threatened with knives and guns. 30 activists were arrested, 27 "are being held by the Russian Coast Guard against their will".

Phil Radford, executive director of Greenpeace USA, stated that the reaction of the Russian Coast Guard "was the stiffest response that Greenpeace has encountered from a government since the bombing of the Rainbow Warrior in 1985."

To free their activists and end Arctic drilling, the campaigners claimed to sign a petition to the Russian Ambassadors all over the world, and to send a protest-note to Authorities.

In continuity of the successful campaign to reach the Antarctic-Environmental Protocol, in 2012 and 2013 protests with "Save the Arctic" banners were started. To stop oil- and gas-drilling, industrial fishing and military operations in the Arctic region completely, a "global sanctuary in the high arctic" was demanded from the World leaders at the UN General Assembly: "We want them to pass a UN resolution expressing international concern for the Arctic." A resolution to protect the very vulnerable wildlife and ecosystem. 30 Arctic Sunrise activists were arrested in the Pechora Sea, 19 September 2013, witnessing oil-drilling and protesting at the Gazprom platform Prirazlomnaya by the Russian Coast Guard. Greenpeace members were originally charged with Piracy, then later downgraded to hooliganism, before being dropped altogether following the passage of an amnesty law by the Russian government. Today the Gazprom platform Prirazlomnaya is the only platform in the world which continues drilling, oil extraction, and storage operations. Though the project has been heavily criticized by environmental groups there have never happened serious emergencies. The platform is compliant with the most stringent safety requirements. There are walls of caisson between the well and the sea. Spill of oil and petroleum products from the well into the sea is excluded.

== Criticism ==
The campaign has been criticised for not accounting for the legal differences in ownership between Antarctica and the Arctic.

== See also ==
- Antarctic
- Arctic Refuge drilling controversy
- Climate change in the Arctic
- Seattle Arctic drilling protests
