= 2023 Shell oil platform protest =

Greenpeace protest against Shell

The 2023 Shell oil platform protest was a Greenpeace action in which activists boarded and occupied a Shell oil platform being transported across the Atlantic Ocean.

== Historical background ==
In 2018, Shell began investing in the redevelopment of the Penguin oil and gas field, northeast of the Shetland Islands. It authorized the construction of the Penguins FPSO, the company's first manned installation in the UK North Sea in 30 years.

Construction of the platform was completed by China's Offshore Oil Engineering Company in November 2022. The 34,000-tonne FPSO was then transported from China by Dutch shipping company Boskalis with its vessel the White Marlin. The platform was said to allow Shell to develop eight new wells at the Penguins field, with expected output reaching up to 45,000 barrels of oil equivalent per day.

== Boarding and protest ==
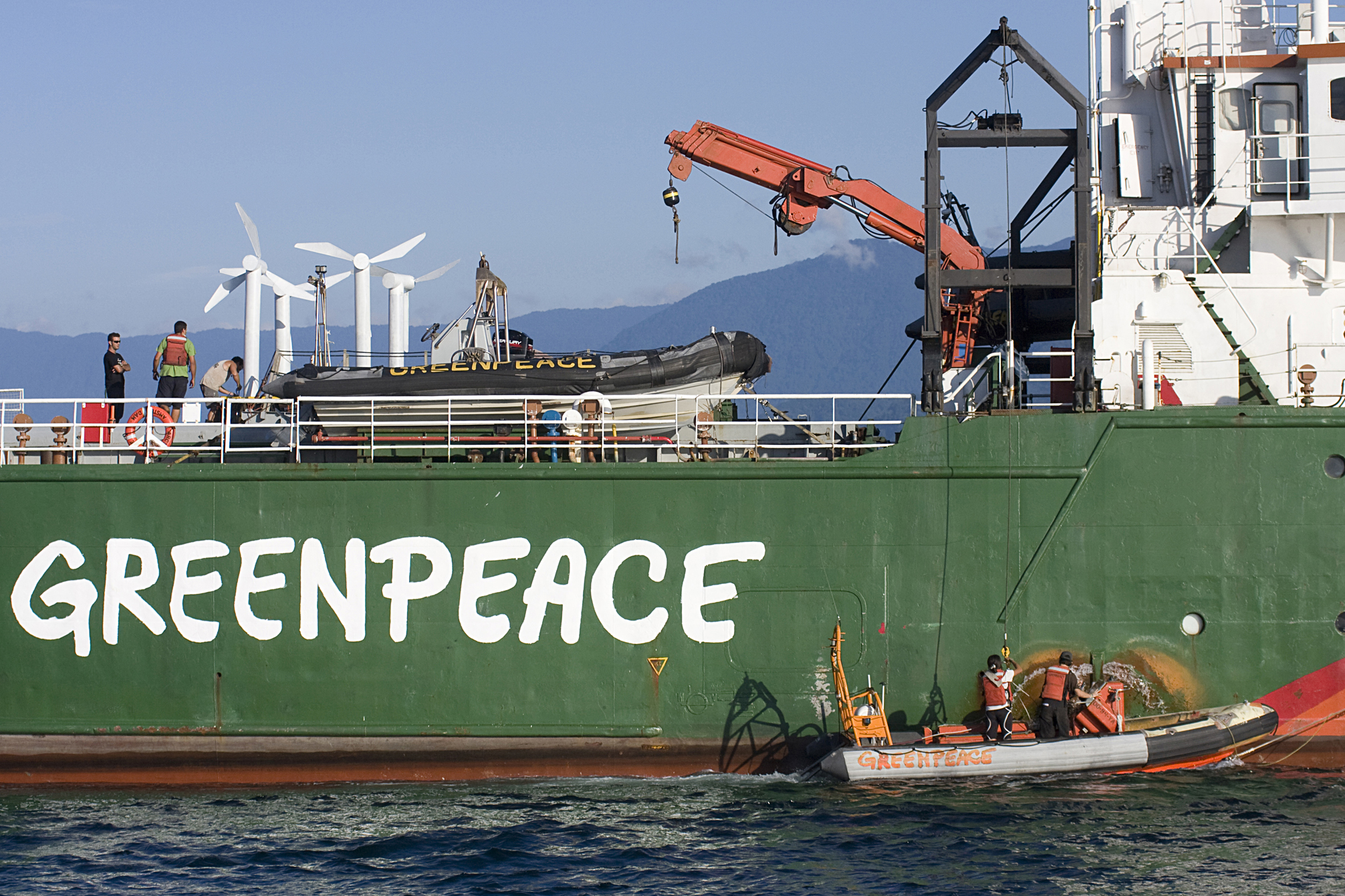
The Arctic Sunrise in 2009, the Greenpeace vessel where activists launched from during the 2023 protest.

On January 31, 2023, six Greenpeace activists approached the White Marlin in three boats launched from the Greenpeace ship Arctic Sunrise. The platform was still in route to the North Sea and in the Atlantic Ocean north of Gran Canaria at the time. Four of them used ropes to climb onto the deck. The four activists occupied the vessel's cargo and displayed a banner reading "Stop Drilling. Start Paying."

Shell sought an injunction against Greenpeace while the four activists occupied the platform. The injunction required two of Greenpeace's ships to stay clear of the White Marlin. After the injunction, two more activists boarded using a chartered trimaran and small boats which were not listed in the injunction. The following day, a court issued an order barring further boardings and requiring the six activists to leave the platform upon its arrival in Norway.

The activists set up a wind turbine on the platform to power their communications equipment. Other activists who did not board sailed out to confront the White Marlin without boarding it. The occupation ended on February 12, 2026 when the vessel docked at Haugesund, Norway. No arrests were made after the activists left the platform.

== Litigation and settlement ==
In February 2023 Shell sent a claim to Greenpeace $120,000 over damage it claimed was caused during the occupation. In November 2023 Shell filed a lawsuit against Greenpeace, seeking $2.1 million for legal, safety and security costs it incurred because of the protest. Shell also asked the court to bar Greenpeace from protesting at its offshore infrastructure.

Shell offered to settle for $1.4 million if Greenpeace agreed to never protest against future Shell infrastructure at sea or port, but Greenpeace refused the settlement, calling it a strategic lawsuit against public participation. In a December 2023 filing Shell reduced the claim to about $1 million.

The lawsuit was settled out of court in December 2024 with Greenpeace donating £300,000 to the Royal National Lifeboat Institution and accepting no liability or paying anything directly to Shell. The activists involved agreed not to travel within 500 metres of three Shell North Sea sites for five years.

== See also ==
- Greenpeace Arctic Sunrise ship case
- Just Stop Oil
- List of litigation involving Greenpeace
- Seattle Arctic drilling protests
