= List of litigation involving Greenpeace =

Greenpeace and its activists been involved in various litigation matters, generally regarding its environmental advocacy. Litigation has involved lawsuits and government actions.

== Argentina ==
Year	Case or action	Type	Role
2019	Yaguareté amparo (Gran Chaco deforestation)	Environmental / species protection	Plaintiff
In 2019, Greenpeace Argentina filed a judicial amparo against the provinces of Chaco, Salta, Formosa and Santiago del Estero and the national state, for failing to enforce the Forest Law and destroying the habitat of jaguars. It sought to have zero deforestation in jaguar territory and a management plan under Law 25.463. The Supreme Court convened a public hearing with the organization in February 2022, one of only four cases selected for public hearing that year, and Greenpeace returned to the court in 2024 seeking suspension of renewed clearing authorizations in Chaco.
2026	Glacier Law reform collective amparo	Constitutional / glacier protection	Plaintiff
In May 2026, Greenpeace, the Fundación Ambiente y Recursos Naturales and the Argentine Association of Environmental Lawyers filed a collective amparo in the federal court of La Pampa against the April 2026 reform of the Glacier Law, arguing that the reform is unconstitutional. The amparo, joined by more than 850,000 adherents, sought suspension of the reform.

== Australia ==
Year	Case or action	Type	Role
1994	Greenpeace Australia Ltd v. Redbank Power Company	Climate / development consent	Applicant
In 1994, Greenpeace Australia challenged the development consent for the Redbank power station in the Hunter Valley. It argued before the Land and Environment Court of New South Wales that the plant's net increase in carbon dioxide emissions contradicted emission reduction policies. In 1994, it was held that the applicable law did not prohibit new power stations, dismissing the appeal and approving the power station subject to mitigation conditions. The case was Australia's first climate change case.
2021	AGL Energy Ltd v. Greenpeace Australia Pacific	Trademark / copyright	Defendant
In May 2021, AGL Energy sued Greenpeace Australia Pacific in the Federal Court of Australia over a campaign that used the company's logo with the tagline "Australia's Greatest Liability". In June 2021, the court dismissed the trademark claim and held that most of the campaign was fair dealing for parody or satire under the Copyright Act. Limited injunctive relief was granted over a small number of posts and placards, and the damages claim was refused.

== Austria ==
Year	Case or action	Type	Role
2020	Klimaklage constitutional collective action	Climate / tax law	Applicant
In 2020, Greenpeace along with 8,060 co-applicants filed an application at the Constitutional Court challenging the kerosene tax exemption for domestic flights and the VAT exemption for international flights as unconstitutional. The court rejected the application on strictly formal grounds, holding the applicants were not directly affected in their rights and not entitled to challenge the provisions.

== Brazil ==
Year	Case or action	Type	Role
2020	ADPF against abandonment of the PPCDAm deforestation plan	Climate / deforestation	Interested party
In 2020, an action was filed at the Supreme Federal Tribunal, challenging the federal government's abandonment of the Amazon deforestation control plan. The action was researched, conceived, and compiled by ten organizations including Greenpeace Brasil, but filed by political parties as the organizations lacked standing.
2025	Coalition suit against Petrobras Bloco 59 drilling (Foz do Amazonas)	Environmental / oil licensing	Plaintiff
In 2025, eight organizations, including Greenpeace Brazil, filed an action in the federal courts against Ibama, Petrobras and the Union, seeking annulment of a drilling license issued to them two days prior. The Federal Public Ministry filed its own parallel nullity action in December 2025. In 2026, the 1st Federal Court of Amapa rejected the demand to impose the same studies and consultations on all future Equatorial Margin projects in advance and holding the licence-validity question foreclosed by earlier litigation. It noted each project remains subject to individual review.
2025	ADI 7919 (environmental licensing laws)	Constitutional / environmental licensing	Interested party
In 2025, the PSOL party and the Articulation of Indigenous Peoples of Brazil filed an action with the Supreme Federal Tribunal seeking the suspension of Law 15.190/2025, the General Environmental Licensing Law, and Law 15.300/2025. The court took the case up for judgment together with two parallel actions and an industry counter-action in August 2026.

== Canada ==
Year	Case or action	Type	Role
1989	Charitable status revocations and refusals	Charity regulation	Subject
Revenue Canada revoked Greenpeace's charitable status in 1989. In 1994, an audit found gifts to non-qualified donees and a lack of direction and control over funds sent to Greenpeace International. The registration of Greenpeace Canada Charitable Foundation was then revoked for cause in October 1998. Revenue Canada subsequently refused to register the successor Greenpeace Environmental Foundation.
2013	Resolute Forest Products v. Greenpeace Canada	Defamation	Defendant
In 2013, Resolute Forest Products sued Greenpeace Canada and campaigner Shane Moffatt in the Ontario Superior Court of Justice for defamation, malicious falsehood and intentional interference with economic relations over a campaign alleging that the company was logging in off-limits areas of the boreal forest. Resolute sought CA$5 million in damages, later reported as CA$7 million. In February 2017, the Court of Appeal for Ontario upheld a lower court decision striking portions of Resolute's amended claim that sought to put Greenpeace's past statements and conduct worldwide at issue. In April 2024, the parties announced that the Ontario action and Resolute's related racketeering suit in the United States had been resolved.
2018	Greenpeace Canada v. Minister of the Environment, Conservation and Parks	Judicial review	Applicant
In September 2018, Greenpeace Canada, represented by Ecojustice, applied to the Ontario Superior Court of Justice for judicial review, alleging that the provincial government had breached the public consultation requirements of Ontario's Environmental Bill of Rights when it revoked the regulation underpinning the province's cap-and-trade program and introduced legislation to cancel it. In October 2019, the Divisional Court dismissed the application, holding that declaratory relief would have no practical effect once the program had been repealed by statute. Two of the three judges found that the government had acted unlawfully by treating the 2018 provincial election as a substitute for the required consultation.

== Finland ==
Year	Case or action	Type	Role
2022	First Finnish climate case	Climate	Applicant
In 2022, Greenpeace Nordic and the Finnish Association for Nature Conservation appealed to the Supreme Administrative Court over the government's annual climate report. They argued that the state failed its duty under the Climate Change Act to decide on additional measures. In June 2023, the court dismissed the appeal as inadmissible. The case was the first climate case in Finland.
2024	Second Finnish climate case	Climate	Applicant
In August 2024, six organizations including Greenpeace Nordic filed a second appeal, arguing that the government's climate measures violate the Climate Act. In January 2025, the Supreme Administrative Court found the appeal admissible but rejected it on the merits, holding that it could not be established that the measures were insufficient to meet the 2030 and 2035 targets.

== France ==
Year	Case or action	Type	Role
1972	McTaggart v. France (Vega ramming and beating)	Civil / damages	Interested party
In June 1972, David McTaggart sailed the Greenpeace yacht Vega into the French nuclear test zone off Moruroa, where a French navy vessel rammed the yacht. In August 1973, French personnel boarded the Vega and beat McTaggart and a crew member. McTaggart sued France in the French courts and was awarded damages. Greenpeace funded the voyage but was not a party.
1982	Seizure of the Vega and crew arrests (Moruroa)	Ship seizure / detention	Subject
In 1982, French forces arrested the crew of the Vega and seized the yacht during a protest at Moruroa against underground testing. The yacht was held for about a year before being returned to Auckland. No prosecution is recorded.
1995	Seizure of the Rainbow Warrior II (Moruroa)	Ship seizure / detention	Subject
In July 1995, French navy personnel boarded the Rainbow Warrior II using tear gas after it entered the territorial zone around Moruroa during a protest against the resumption of nuclear testing. Eleven people, including journalists, were removed and the ship was seized. The ship was later allowed to leave.
2002	Esso v. Greenpeace France (E$$O parody)	Trademark / free expression	Defendant
In 2002, Esso sued Greenpeace France over its use of the parodies E$$O and STOP E$$O in a campaign criticizing ExxonMobil's environmental policy, claiming trademark infringement and denigration. The lower courts ruled for Greenpeace. In April 2008, the Cour de cassation rejected Esso's appeal, holding that the parodies were a proportionate exercise of free expression.
2002	Areva (SPCEA) v. Greenpeace France	Trademark / free expression	Defendant
In 2002, the holder of the Areva trademark sued Greenpeace France and Greenpeace New Zealand over campaign images pairing the company's logo with a skull and a dead fish. In November 2006, the Paris Court of Appeal ruled against Greenpeace. In April 2008, the Cour de cassation quashed that judgment, holding that the organizations had not abused their freedom of expression.
2011	EDF spying prosecution (Greenpeace France as civil party)	Criminal / corporate espionage	Civil party
In November 2011, the Nanterre criminal court found that EDF had used a security firm to spy on Greenpeace France's anti-nuclear campaign in 2006, including hacking the computer of campaigns head Yannick Jadot. EDF was fined 1.5 million euros, two EDF security executives were sentenced to prison, and Greenpeace France was awarded 500,000 euros as civil party. In February 2013, the Versailles Court of Appeal acquitted EDF as a company.
2017	Creusot Forge anomalies criminal instruction	Nuclear safety / criminal	Civil party
In 2017, Greenpeace France filed a criminal complaint as civil party over manufacturing anomalies at the Creusot Forge plant that were uncovered through defects in the Flamanville EPR reactor vessel. A judicial investigation is ongoing at the Paris judicial tribunal.
2019	Notre Affaire à Tous and Others v. France (L'Affaire du Siècle)	Climate / state liability	Applicant
In March 2019, Oxfam France, Greenpeace France, the Nicolas Hulot Foundation and Notre Affaire à Tous sued the French state in the Paris Administrative Court over its failure to meet its greenhouse gas reduction commitments. In February 2021, the court held the state responsible, and in October 2021 it ordered the state to repair the resulting ecological damage by the end of 2022. In December 2023, the court found that the state had not fully executed the judgment but declined to order further measures. In December 2024, the Conseil d'État held that the organizations' challenge to that ruling belongs before the Paris administrative court of appeal, where it is pending.
2019	Commune de Grande-Synthe v. France	Climate	Intervener
In 2019, Greenpeace France intervened in the commune of Grande-Synthe's challenge to the state's refusal to take additional emission reduction measures. In November 2020, the Conseil d'État ordered the government to justify within three months that the 2030 reduction target could be met. In July 2021, it ordered the government to take all necessary measures by March 2022. In May 2023, it ordered new measures by June 2024 with progress reports.
2019	Greenpeace France and Réseau Sortir du nucléaire v. ASN (backup diesel generators)	Nuclear safety / administrative	Applicant
In August 2019, Greenpeace France and Réseau Sortir du nucléaire appealed decisions of the Nuclear Safety Authority that postponed and waived backup diesel generator requirements at EDF reactors, and filed a criminal complaint against EDF. A judicial investigation is ongoing at the Paris judicial tribunal, in which Greenpeace France is a civil party.
2020	Prosecution of Greenpeace activists (Tricastin intrusion)	Criminal / protest	Defendant
In February 2020, Greenpeace activists entered EDF's Tricastin Nuclear Power Plant in a protest against the ageing of the French reactor fleet. Thirty-four activists were prosecuted. In September 2021, the Valence criminal court fined each activist 300 euros.
2022	Prosecution of Greenpeace France (Flamanville EPR site intrusion)	Criminal / protest	Defendant
In 2022, Greenpeace activists entered the Flamanville EPR construction site. In 2024, Greenpeace France was fined 80,000 euros over the intrusion, and seven activists were fined 500 to 800 euros each.
2022	Greenpeace France, Notre Affaire à Tous and Les Amis de la Terre v. TotalEnergies (greenwashing)	Consumer protection	Plaintiff
In March 2022, Greenpeace France, Notre Affaire à Tous and Les Amis de la Terre sued TotalEnergies over the advertising campaign for its 2021 rebranding, alleging that its carbon neutrality and energy transition claims were misleading commercial practices under consumer protection law. In October 2025, the Paris Judicial Tribunal found the claims of carbon neutrality by 2050 and of being a major player in the energy transition misleading and ordered their removal. It dismissed the claims concerning gas and agrofuel communications. TotalEnergies stated that it would not appeal.
2023	TotalEnergies v. Greenpeace France and Factor-X	Defamation / SLAPP	Defendant
In April 2023, TotalEnergies sued Greenpeace France and the consultancy Factor-X over a report estimating the company's 2019 emissions at about four times its reported figure, seeking removal of the report. In March 2024, the Paris Judicial Court declared the summons null as too vague for Greenpeace France to defend against.
2024	Prosecution over the Cape Ann LNG terminal action (Le Havre)	Criminal / protest	Interested party
In September 2023, Greenpeace activists attempted to block the floating LNG terminal Cape Ann from entering the port of Le Havre. Four activists, the Greenpeace France spokesperson and two photojournalists were prosecuted in the Le Havre maritime court. Greenpeace France was not charged. In December 2024, the court acquitted all seven defendants.
2024	Prosecution of Greenpeace France (Gravelines nuclear plant action)	Criminal / protest	Defendant
In October 2024, twelve Greenpeace activists entered the perimeter of the Gravelines Nuclear Power Station by boat in a protest against marine submersion risks at the site. In September 2025, the Dunkerque criminal court found Greenpeace France guilty and fined it 30,000 euros, and fined each activist 800 euros. EDF, as civil party, claimed 890,090 euros in damages, with a hearing set for January 2026.

== Greece ==
Year	Case or action	Type	Role
2019	Challenge to the Crete hydrocarbon EIA approval	Oil and gas / environmental approval	Applicant
In May 2019, WWF Greece, Greenpeace Greece and the Pelagos Cetacean Research Institute applied to the Council of State for annulment of the ministerial environmental approval of hydrocarbon exploration southwest and west of Crete. The case was heard in November 2022.
2023	First Greek climate recourse (Alexandroupolis FSRU)	Climate / LNG approvals	Applicant
In December 2023, WWF Greece, Greenpeace and three other organizations applied to the Council of State for annulment of the approvals for the Alexandroupolis floating LNG terminal, arguing that no climate assessment had been carried out. The case is pending.

== India ==
Year	Case or action	Type	Role
2010	Tata Sons v. Greenpeace International and Greenpeace India	Trademark / defamation	Defendant
In 2010, Tata Sons sued Greenpeace International and Greenpeace India in the Delhi High Court over the online game Turtle v. Tata, which criticized the impact of the Dhamra port project on olive ridley turtle nesting grounds, claiming trademark infringement and defamation and seeking a permanent injunction and 100 million rupees in damages. In January 2011, the court refused Tata's application for an interim injunction, holding that the use of the mark was parody on a matter of public concern and that defamation must be tested at trial.
2014	Greenpeace India Society v. Union of India (foreign funds freeze)	Judicial review	Petitioner
In June 2014, the home ministry directed the Reserve Bank of India to hold foreign remittances to Greenpeace India following an Intelligence Bureau report on foreign-funded NGOs. Greenpeace India Society petitioned the Delhi High Court. In January 2015, the court ordered the funds unblocked, finding no material on record to restrict the society's access to its account. In 2015, the court allowed the society to receive and use domestic donations while its FCRA registration was suspended. After the registration was cancelled, Greenpeace withdrew the Delhi proceedings.
2014	Essar Power v. Greenpeace India and others (Mahan coal campaign)	Defamation	Defendant
In January 2014, Essar sued Greenpeace India and members of the Mahan Sangharsh Samiti in the Bombay High Court for 500 crore rupees over the campaign against its planned coal mine in the Mahan forests of Singrauli, Madhya Pradesh, and filed a second action in the district court at Waidhan.
2014	FCRA crackdown on Greenpeace India	Foreign funding regulation	Subject
In June 2014, the home ministry began holding Greenpeace India's foreign remittances under the Foreign Contribution (Regulation) Act, 2010. In April 2015, it suspended the organization's FCRA registration for six months and froze seven bank accounts. In September 2015, it cancelled the registration, barring the society from receiving foreign contributions. In November 2015, the Tamil Nadu Registrar of Societies cancelled Greenpeace India's society registration. In 2019, following Enforcement Directorate account freezes, Greenpeace India cut its staff and operations by about half.
2015	Greenpeace India Society v. Union of India (FCRA cancellation)	Judicial review	Petitioner
In September 2015, Greenpeace India Society petitioned the Madras High Court against the cancellation of its FCRA registration, arguing that the ministry had refused to furnish the evidence behind its grounds. The court granted an eight-week interim stay of the cancellation. In November 2016, the registration was renewed. When the ministry issued a fresh order cancelling it, the Madras High Court stayed that order in December 2016.
2015	Priya Pillai v. Union of India	Constitutional	Interested party
In January 2015, Greenpeace India campaigner Priya Pillai was taken off a London-bound flight under a government lookout circular as she travelled to address British parliamentarians on the Mahan coal project. She petitioned the Delhi High Court with Greenpeace's support. In March 2015, the court quashed the lookout circular and ordered the offload stamp removed from her passport, holding that the right to travel abroad flows from Article 21 of the Constitution.

== Japan ==
Year	Case or action	Type	Role
2008	Tokyo Two prosecution (Japan v. Sato and Suzuki)	Criminal	Interested party
In 2008, Greenpeace Japan activists Junichi Sato and Toru Suzuki intercepted a box of whale meat at a delivery depot in Aomori and presented it to prosecutors as evidence of embezzlement within Japan's whaling program. Both were prosecuted for theft and trespass. Greenpeace Japan was not charged. In September 2010, the Aomori District Court convicted both and sentenced each to one year in prison, suspended for three years. In July 2011, the Sendai High Court rejected their appeal.

== Netherlands ==
Year	Case or action	Type	Role
2011	Cairn Energy v. Greenpeace International	Injunction	Defendant
In 2011, Cairn Energy applied to a court in Amsterdam for an injunction after Greenpeace activists twice boarded the Leiv Eiriksson drilling rig off Greenland. In June 2011, the court granted the injunction against Greenpeace International, with a penalty of 50,000 euros for each day of interference with Cairn's drilling up to a maximum of 1 million euros.
2012	Shell v. Greenpeace International	Injunction	Defendant
In September 2012, Royal Dutch Shell sued Greenpeace International in the Amsterdam District Court after activists shut down dozens of Shell filling stations in the Netherlands in a protest against Arctic drilling. Shell sought a six-month ban on any Greenpeace protest within 500 metres of Shell property. In October 2012, the court refused the ban, but ruled that future protests must not prevent customers from buying fuel for more than an hour or block access to Shell's sites for more than two hours.
2019	Milieudefensie v. Royal Dutch Shell	Climate	Plaintiff
In April 2019, Greenpeace Netherlands, Milieudefensie, five other organizations and more than 17,000 individuals brought a collective action against Royal Dutch Shell in the Hague District Court. In May 2021, the court ordered Shell to cut its emissions by 45 percent by 2030 relative to 2019. In November 2024, the Hague Court of Appeal set aside the reduction order while affirming that Shell owes a duty of care to limit its emissions. In February 2025, Milieudefensie appealed to the Supreme Court of the Netherlands.
2023	Greenpeace v. State of the Netherlands (nitrogen case)	Environmental	Plaintiff
In July 2023, Greenpeace Netherlands brought a collective action against the State over nitrogen deposition on protected habitats. In January 2025, the Hague District Court held that the State was acting unlawfully by failing to halt the deterioration of nitrogen-sensitive Natura 2000 habitats and ordered it to meet the statutory 2030 target, on pain of a 10 million euro penalty. A separate application for interim relief in 2024 had been rejected. In April 2025, the State appealed to the Hague Court of Appeal.
2024	Greenpeace Nederland and Bonaire residents v. State of the Netherlands (Bonaire climate case)	Climate	Plaintiff
In 2024, eight residents of Bonaire and Greenpeace Netherlands sued the State over climate protection for the island. In January 2026, the Hague District Court held that the State had done too little to protect Bonaire's residents from climate change and had treated them less favourably than residents of the European Netherlands, in breach of the European Convention on Human Rights. It ordered the State to adopt binding interim emission reduction targets within 18 months and a plan to protect Bonaire from climate impacts by 2030. In April 2026, the cabinet announced that it would appeal.
2025	Greenpeace International v. Energy Transfer	Anti-SLAPP	Plaintiff
In February 2025, Greenpeace International sued Energy Transfer in the Amsterdam District Court, seeking a declaration that the company's lawsuits against Greenpeace entities in the United States over the Dakota Access Pipeline protests were unlawful, together with damages. The case was the first to invoke the European Union's 2024 anti-SLAPP directive. In 2026, the Amsterdam court rejected Energy Transfer's request to dismiss the case, but also ruled that the EU anti-SLAPP directive does not apply in the case because it has not been implemented into law, leaving the litigation to proceed under ordinary tort law.

== United States ==
Year	Case or action	Type	Role
1990	Greenpeace USA v. Stone	Environmental / NEPA	Plaintiff
In August 1990, Greenpeace USA and the Stichting Greenpeace Council sued the Secretary of the Army and the Secretary of Defense in the District of Hawaii to stop the shipment of chemical munitions from Germany to Johnston Atoll, arguing that the shipment required an environmental impact statement under the National Environmental Policy Act. In September 1990, the court denied a preliminary injunction, holding that the Act did not apply to the phases of the operation outside the United States.
1993	Greenpeace, Inc. v. Waste Technologies Industries (WTI incinerator)	Hazardous waste / RCRA	Plaintiff
In 1993, Greenpeace and twelve residents of East Liverpool, Ohio sued under the Resource Conservation and Recovery Act to stop operation of the WTI hazardous waste incinerator and obtained a district court injunction pending the EPA's final permitting decision. In November 1993, the Sixth Circuit reversed for lack of jurisdiction, holding that the suit was a collateral attack on a valid permit. In January 1995, the D.C. Circuit dismissed related petitions by Greenpeace and residents for review of EPA approvals of commercial operation.
1998	Greenpeace v. National Marine Fisheries Service (Steller sea lion litigation)	Endangered Species Act	Plaintiff
In 1998, Greenpeace, American Oceans Campaign and the Sierra Club sued the National Marine Fisheries Service in the Western District of Washington, challenging the North Pacific groundfish fishery management plans under the Endangered Species Act and the National Environmental Policy Act over their effects on the Steller sea lion. In January 2000, the court found the agency's biological opinion inadequate, and in July 2000 it enjoined groundfish trawling within Steller sea lion critical habitat. The injunction was dissolved in November 2000 after the agency issued a new biological opinion. The litigation continued into 2002.
2003	United States v. Greenpeace (sailor mongering prosecution)	Criminal	Defendant
In 2003, federal prosecutors indicted Greenpeace Inc. under an 1872 statute against sailor mongering over the 2002 boarding of the cargo ship APL Jade off Miami by activists protesting a shipment of Amazon mahogany. In May 2004, the court entered a judgment of acquittal after the prosecution rested, finding no evidence that the vessel was about to arrive at port within the meaning of the statute.
2004	State of Alaska v. Greenpeace	Criminal / regulatory	Defendant
In 2004, Alaska charged Greenpeace, the captain of the Arctic Sunrise and the ship's agent with misdemeanor criminal negligence after the vessel entered state waters for a campaign in the Tongass National Forest without the required oil spill response plan on file. In May 2005, a jury in Ketchikan convicted Greenpeace on two counts and the captain on three, and acquitted the agent. The trial court later set the verdicts aside. In 2008, the Alaska Court of Appeals upheld those rulings except as to one count against the captain, which it reinstated.
2010	Greenpeace, Inc. v. Dow Chemical Co. and others	Corporate espionage / torts	Plaintiff
In November 2010, Greenpeace sued Dow, Sasol North America, the public relations firms Ketchum and Dezenhall Resources, and former managers of the security firm Beckett Brown International, alleging that the firm had been paid to spy on Greenpeace from 1998 to 2000 through surveillance and the theft of internal documents. In September 2011, the federal court dismissed the racketeering claims and declined jurisdiction over the remaining claims. The refiled claims in the District of Columbia courts were dismissed, and in August 2014 the D.C. Court of Appeals affirmed.
2012	Shell Offshore Inc. v. Greenpeace, Inc. (2012 injunction)	Injunction / protest restraint	Defendant
In 2012, Shell sued Greenpeace Inc. in the District of Alaska after activists boarded the drilling ship Noble Discoverer in New Zealand. The court granted a preliminary injunction establishing safety zones around Shell's Arctic drilling fleet. In March 2013, the Ninth Circuit affirmed.
2015	Shell Offshore Inc. v. Greenpeace (2015 injunction)	Injunction / protest restraint	Defendant
In April 2015, Shell sued Greenpeace again after six activists boarded a ship carrying the Polar Pioneer drilling rig across the Pacific. The court issued an injunction establishing safety zones around Shell's Chukchi Sea fleet through October 2015. In 2016, the Ninth Circuit dismissed Greenpeace's appeal as moot after Shell ended its Arctic exploration program and the injunction expired.
2016	Resolute Forest Products v. Greenpeace International and others (RICO)	RICO / SLAPP	Defendant
In May 2016, Resolute Forest Products sued Greenpeace International, Greenpeace Inc., Greenpeace Fund, Stand.earth and individual campaigners under the Racketeer Influenced and Corrupt Organizations Act over a campaign against the company, seeking 300 million dollars in damages. The case was transferred from Georgia to the Northern District of California. In October 2017, the court dismissed the claims as insufficiently pleaded. In January 2019, the court dismissed the racketeering counts and found nearly all of the 296 challenged statements to be protected speech, leaving one defamation claim and a related unfair competition claim. Resolute was ordered to pay about 800,000 dollars of the defendants' fees and costs under California's anti-SLAPP law. In April 2023, the remaining claim was dismissed, and in April 2024 the parties announced a settlement ending the litigation in the United States and Ontario.
2017	Energy Transfer v. Greenpeace (Dakota Access Pipeline litigation)	RICO / defamation	Defendant
In August 2017, Energy Transfer sued Greenpeace International, Greenpeace Inc. and Greenpeace Fund in federal court under the Racketeer Influenced and Corrupt Organizations Act over the Dakota Access Pipeline protests, seeking 900 million dollars in damages. In February 2019, the court dismissed all claims. Energy Transfer refiled state law claims in Morton County. In March 2025, a jury found the three Greenpeace entities liable for defamation and other claims and awarded more than 660 million dollars. In February 2026, the trial judge reduced the award and entered judgment of about 345 million dollars. The Greenpeace defendants sought a new trial and appellate review. In 2026, the North Dakota Supreme Court limited an anti-suit injunction sought by Energy Transfer so that it did not foreclose Greenpeace International's related anti-SLAPP case in the Netherlands.
2020	Greenpeace, Inc. v. Walmart Inc.	Consumer protection / greenwashing	Plaintiff
In December 2020, Greenpeace sued Walmart in California state court, alleging that labeling private label plastic products and packaging as recyclable violated California's Environmental Marketing Claims Act and unfair competition law. Walmart removed the case to the Northern District of California. The court dismissed the complaint repeatedly for lack of standing, and in June 2022 the parties stipulated to dismissal without prejudice.

== United Kingdom ==
Year	Case or action	Type	Role
1995	Brent Spar occupation proceedings	Civil / protest	Defendant
In 1995, Shell obtained interdicts in the Scottish courts against Greenpeace over the occupation of the Brent Spar storage buoy during the campaign against its deep-sea disposal. Shell abandoned the disposal plan in June 1995.
1999	R v. Melchett and others (GM crop trial)	Criminal / protest	Interested party
In July 1999, Greenpeace UK executive director Lord Melchett and 27 volunteers cut down part of a genetically modified maize trial crop at Lyng, Norfolk, and were prosecuted for theft and criminal damage. In April 2000, a Norwich Crown Court jury acquitted them of theft but could not reach a verdict on criminal damage. In September 2000, a second jury acquitted all 28 of criminal damage, accepting the defence that they acted to protect neighbouring property from GM contamination.
2005	R (Greenpeace) v. Secretary of State for Trade and Industry (nuclear consultation)	Judicial review	Applicant
In 2006, Greenpeace challenged the government's energy review decision supporting new nuclear power stations, arguing that the consultation process had been flawed. In February 2007, the High Court held the decision unlawful, finding the consultation procedurally unfair, and the government was required to consult again before reaffirming its nuclear policy.
2007	R v. Hewke and others (Kingsnorth Six)	Criminal / protest	Interested party
In October 2007, six Greenpeace climbers scaled the chimney of Kingsnorth power station and painted on it, and were prosecuted for criminal damage. In September 2008, a Maidstone Crown Court jury acquitted all six, accepting the lawful excuse defence that they acted to protect property from climate change, after evidence from James Hansen.
2017	Electoral Commission fine under the Lobbying Act	Campaign finance regulation	Subject
In April 2017, the Electoral Commission fined Greenpeace Ltd 30,000 pounds for failing to register as a non-party campaigner at the 2015 general election, after finding at least 111,000 pounds of regulated spending on a boat tour and a joint anti-fracking poster campaign with Friends of the Earth, which was fined 1,000 pounds. It was the first fine issued under the Lobbying Act for failing to register.
2019	Transocean v. Greenpeace UK (Vorlich rig protest)	Civil / interdict and contempt	Defendant
In June 2019, Transocean obtained an interim interdict in the Court of Session barring anyone connected with Greenpeace from boarding or approaching the drilling rig Paul B Loyd Jr, bound for BP's Vorlich field. Greenpeace activists boarded the rig and its ship shadowed the rig for 12 days. In July 2020, the court found Greenpeace UK in contempt and fined it 80,000 pounds.
2021	Greenpeace Ltd v. Advocate General for Scotland (Vorlich permit challenge)	Judicial review / oil permits	Applicant
Greenpeace challenged the government's consent for BP to develop the Vorlich field, arguing that the environmental assessment should have considered emissions from burning the extracted oil. In October 2021, the Court of Session rejected the challenge. Greenpeace stated that it would seek to appeal to the Supreme Court.
2021	Rosebank and Jackdaw oil and gas field challenges	Judicial review / oil permits	Applicant
Greenpeace UK and Uplift challenged the government's consents for the Rosebank oil field and the Jackdaw gas field. In January 2025, the Court of Session ruled the consents unlawful because the environmental impact assessments had not considered emissions from burning the extracted fuels. The court allowed preparatory work to continue but barred extraction until fresh consent was granted.
2023	Shell v. Greenpeace (White Marlin boarding claim)	Civil / protest damages	Defendant
In January 2023, Greenpeace activists boarded the vessel White Marlin at sea while it carried a Shell production platform to the North Sea. In November 2023, Shell sued Greenpeace International and Greenpeace UK in the High Court, claiming about 2.1 million dollars in damages and seeking an injunction against protests at its infrastructure. In December 2024, the parties settled without payment to Shell. Greenpeace agreed to donate 300,000 pounds to the Royal National Lifeboat Institution and to stop protesting for a period at four Shell North Sea sites.
2024	Rosebank and Jackdaw fresh consent applications	Judicial review / oil permits	Applicant
Following the January 2025 ruling, Shell and Equinor stated that they would continue work on Jackdaw and Rosebank and resubmit their consent applications with assessments of downstream emissions.

== See also ==
- Criticism of Greenpeace
- Climate change litigation
- List of environmental lawsuits
- Environmental movement
