= Criticism of Human Rights Watch =

The international non-governmental organization Human Rights Watch (HRW) has been the subject of extensive criticism from a number of observers. Critics of HRW include the national governments it has investigated, the media, and its former chairman Robert L. Bernstein.

The criticism generally falls into the category of alleged bias, frequently in response to critical HRW reports. Bias allegations include the organization's being influenced by United States government policy, particularly in relation to reporting on Yugoslavia, Latin America, and the misrepresentation of human-rights issues in Eritrea and Ethiopia. Accusations in relation to the Arab–Israeli conflict include claims that HRW is biased against Israel. HRW has publicly responded to criticism of its reporting on Latin America and the Arab–Israeli conflict.

== Allegations involving Nabeel Rajab and Al Tajdeed Society (Alsafara Cult) ==
In 2023, Nabeel Rajab, a human rights activist from Bahrain and a member of the Advisory Committee of Human Rights Watch's Middle East Division, faced accusations of corruption and bias due to his family ties to the controversial organization, Al Tajdeed Society. The society's chairman, Redha Rajab, is Nabeel's brother. The accusations gained traction after Nabeel's nephew, Dr. Ali Rajab, a former member of the society, urged his uncle to lead an investigation to look into allegations that the society was a front for a cult and engaged in harassment and abusive practices.

Dr. Ali Rajab claimed that the "Alsafara Cult" was founded by Abdulwahab Albasri while serving his sentence at Jaw prison in the 1980s. Former members of the cult, including Basema Qassab, supported these claims in her interviews, books and expressed support for Dr. Ali. As of June 16, 2023, Nabeel Rajab has not publicly addressed Dr. Ali's initiative.

Following the allegations, Bahrain's public prosecution and local authorities investigated and found evidence of systematic human rights abuses to control followers which were perpetrated by the society, including forced marriages and involuntary detention, leading to suicide attempts in some cases. On May 21, 2023, Redha Rajab, Nabeel's brother and AlTajdeed society chairman, was sentenced to prison.

These events sparked outrage and raised concerns about Nabeel's involvement and motives with the society and its practices, according to various news outlets. There were public inquiries into the influence of the AlTajdeed society on Nabeel Rajab through his family connections. It emerged that Rajab's son, Adam, was married to the daughter of Hasan Mohamedi, a member of AlTajdeed society, who had publicly sexually harassed Dr. Ali Rajab on X (formerly Twitter). Nabeel Rajab was accused of leveraging his influence in human rights organizations to support AlTajdeed and ignore allegations of human rights violations by the group and his nephew's request to investigate the “Cult” without addressing them.

In a June 12, 2023 interview published on Muwatin, Nabeel Rajab revealed that during his imprisonment, he shared a cell with ISIS prisoners and maintained good relations with them even after his release. This revelation has further fueled the controversy surrounding his ties with Al-Tajdeed (Alsafara Cult) and ignoring his nephew's initiative to conduct an impartial investigation into the Cult's practices while maintaining good relations with extremists convicted for terrorism charges. Human Rights Watch released a statement defending AlTajdeed's right for freedom of speech without any mention of the human rights violation allegations stated by Dr. Ali Rajab and the cult aspect, which was supported by multiple former members. In contrast, other organizations such as Amnesty International took a non-biased approach, releasing a statement expressing grave concern over the group's mistreatment of its members while also condemning the state's prosecution of people for their opinions, beliefs, and statements.

== Allegations of ideological and selection bias ==
In May 2014 an open letter was published criticising Human Rights Watch for what were described as its close ties to the government of the United States. The letter was signed by Nobel Peace Laureates Adolfo Pérez Esquivel and Mairead Corrigan, former UN Assistant Secretary-General Hans von Sponeck, United Nations Special Rapporteur on Human Rights in the Palestinian Territories Richard A. Falk, and over 100 scholars and cultural figures. The letter highlighted a number of Human Rights Watch officials who had been involved in foreign policy roles in the US government, including Washington advocacy director Tom Malinowski, formerly a speechwriter for Madeleine Albright and a special adviser to Bill Clinton, and subsequently Assistant Secretary of State for Democracy, Human Rights, and Labor to John Kerry, and HRW Americas advisory committee members Myles Frechette (a former United States Ambassador to Colombia) and Michael Shifter (former Latin America director for the US government-funded National Endowment for Democracy). The letter contrasted HRW's criticism of Venezuela's candidacy for the United Nations Human Rights Council in a letter to Hugo Chávez to the lack of censure regarding the United States' tenure as a member of the council, despite the US government's use of a "kill list" for designated enemies, ongoing usage of extraordinary renditions and the continued detention of combatants at Guantanamo Bay Naval Base. The signatories called on Human Rights Watch to ban those involved in formulating or carrying out US foreign policy from serving as members of the organisation's staff, advisers or board members, or as a "bare minimum", instituting lengthy cooling-off periods between spells working for HRW and in the service of US foreign policy.

Left-wing academic and labour organizer Immanuel Ness writes that HRW rarely criticizes human rights abuses by the United States and its allies, and almost always reaches conclusions consistent with Western foreign policy positions.

== Allegations regarding Latin America ==
Robert Naiman, policy director of Just Foreign Policy, wrote that HRW is "often heavily influenced" by United States foreign policy.

=== Venezuela ===
Human Rights Watch work in Venezuela became controversial in September 2008, when the country's government expelled two HRW staff members accused of "anti-state activities". Then Foreign Minister Nicolás Maduro said, "These groups, dressed up as human rights defenders, are financed by the United States. They are aligned with a policy of attacking countries that are building new economic models." The report highlights the discrimination of Chávez administration against political opponents and freedom of expression. According to one of the expelled members, the decision of the Venezuelan government was against Venezuelan law.

After HRW published a report (A Decade Under Chávez: Political Intolerance and Lost Opportunities for Advancing Human Rights in Venezuela) documenting Chavez government abuses, 118 scholars, activists and film-makers from Argentina, Australia, Brazil, Mexico, the US, the UK, Venezuela and other countries signed a letter, written by US academics Miguel Tinker Salas, Gregory Wilpert and Greg Grandin, criticizing the organization for a perceived bias against the government of Venezuela. The open letter criticized the report, saying that it "does not meet even the most minimal standards of scholarship, impartiality, accuracy, or credibility." HRW director Kenneth Roth responded that the letter misrepresents "both the substance and the source material of the report". Around the same time, Irish journalist Hugh O'Shaughnessy accused HRW of using false and misleading information, saying that the report was "put together with [a] sort of know-nothing Washington bias." Tom Porteous, Human Rights Watch's London director, said that O'Shaughnessy " ... not only fails to provide any evidence for these allegations", but " ... more seriously, he misrepresents HRW's positions in his apparent determination to undermine our well earned international reputation for accuracy and impartiality."

=== Honduras ===
On 21 August 2009, 93 academics and authors from the UK, the US, Canada, Australia, Mexico, Colombia and other countries published an open letter criticizing HRW's "absence of statements and reports" on human-rights violations in Honduras after 8 July 2009, following the 28 June coup d'état. According to its authors, after 8 July HRW had not "raised the alarm over the extra-judicial killings, arbitrary detentions, physical assaults, and attacks on the press - many of which have been thoroughly documented - that have occurred in Honduras, in most cases by the coup regime against the supporters of the democratic and constitutional government of Manuel Zelaya"; they asked HRW to make a strong statement against the human-rights violations and conduct its own investigation. The letter's signers said that the Obama administration was supporting the de facto Roberto Micheletti government by providing "aid money through the Millennium Challenge Account and other sources", training Honduran military students at the School of the Americas and ignoring Honduras' human-rights situation. Four days later, HRW published a summary of the preliminary version of a Honduran human-rights report by the Inter-American Court of Human Rights (IACHR) published on 21 August and cited its earlier reports (published until 8 July): "Given the scope of alleged abuses, and the region's history of bloody coups leading to massive violations, human rights advocates believed the situation warranted the direct intervention of the region's most authoritative human rights investigative body, the Inter-American Commission on Human Rights."

== Allegations pertaining to antisemitism ==
The organization has also been accused of ignoring antisemitism or being antisemitic itself. In a 2005 speech to the Anti-Defamation League former Spanish Foreign Minister Ana Palacio said, "NGOs like Human Rights Watch or Amnesty International pay little attention to anti-Semitism." The ADL has also said, "While Human Rights Watch acknowledged in a May 3 report that there was no evidence of a massacre [in Jenin] and that Palestinian gunmen had contributed to endangering Palestinian civilians, they continued to emphasize that there was prima facie evidence Israel committed war crimes." In The New York Sun, ADL national director Abraham Foxman criticized Roth's use of "a classic anti-Semitic stereotype about Jews". In 2012, New Europe said that HRW "allegedly erased references in its reports to its previous cooperation with the Gaddafi regime, including the role of the organization's MENA Director, Sarah Leah Whitson, in marketing Saif al-Islam Gaddafi as a reformer."

== Criticism regarding the Arab–Israeli conflict ==
=== Allegations of anti-Israel bias ===
HRW has been accused of bias against Israel and having an anti-Israeli agenda.

Robert Bernstein wrote that by focusing on Israel and neglecting human rights violations by less free states in the Middle East that HRW had cast "aside its important distinction between open and closed societies." In response, Aryeh Neier HRW co-founder and former executive director said, it "is wrong to suggest that open societies should be spared criticism for human rights abuses". Neier also said that Robert Bernstein's distinction between "wrongs committed in self-defense and those committed intentionally" is not made by the laws of war and is dangerous. "On such grounds, groups such as al-Qaeda in Iraq" (which "murdered tens of thousands of civilians after" the 2003 American invasion) could justify their crimes.

Writing in the Wall Street Journal in 2009 about a controversial fundraising event that HRW held in Riyadh, Saudi Arabia, Noah Pollak stated that the organization displayed a strong bias against Israel. Pollak observed that from 2006 to 2009 Human Rights Watch's reports on the Israeli-Arab conflict had been almost entirely devoted to condemning Israel (87 criticisms of Israeli conduct against the Palestinians and Hezbollah, versus eight criticisms of Palestinian groups and four of Hezbollah for attacks on Israel).

For a Jerusalem Post article, Natan Sharansky said: "Here is an organization created by the goodwill of the free world to fight violations of human rights, which has become a tool in the hands of dictatorial regimes to fight against democracies ... It is time to call a spade a spade. The real activity of this organization today is a far cry from what it was set up 30 years ago to do: throw light in dark places where there is really no other way to find out what is happening regarding human rights." HRW executive director Kenneth Roth responded that "Israel accounts for about 15 percent of our published output on the region" and "our war coverage in the region has documented violations by all sides". According to Roth, "By failing to hold those responsible to account, Israel increases anger and resentment among the Palestinian population and in the wider Arab world and undercuts moderates who wish to pursue peace." Time Mideast correspondent Scott MacLeod wrote in the Los Angeles Times that Israeli policy cannot be shielded from a group like Human Rights Watch.

In a November 2012 The Wall Street Journal article, David Feith said that there has been "bitter debate" within HRW about whether Iran's alleged call for annihilation of Israel is a violation of human rights. HRW vice-chair Sid Sheinberg wrote in an internal email that doing nothing while Ahmadinejad wants to "kill Jews and annihilate Israel ... is a position unworthy of our great organization." According to Kenneth Roth, "Tehran isn't inciting genocide and claims to the contrary are part of an effort to beat the war drums against Iran."

In an analysis published by the Jewish Telegraphic Agency, Ron Kampeas criticized HRW reports: "Reconstructions of the horrific death of civilians replete with painstakingly gathered evidence are coupled with bewildering omissions of context and blended into a package that assumes an inherent Israeli immorality" and denounced "efforts to turn criticism of individual officers and soldiers into a wholesale indictment of Israel's military establishment and the decision to resort to military force." According to Kampeas, HRW reports on the 2009 fighting in Gaza "fail to assess evidence — including videos of Israeli forces holding their fire because of the presence of civilians — that Israel has provided to show that such incidents were the exception to the rule; they fail to examine what measures Israel has taken to prevent civilian deaths, which would be pertinent in examining any claim of war crimes."

In October 2009, Robert Bernstein criticized the organization's policy in the Middle East in a New York Times op-ed. According to Bernstein, "With increasing frequency, [HRW] casts aside its important distinction between open and closed societies ... The region is populated by authoritarian regimes with appalling human rights records. Yet in recent years Human Rights Watch has written far more condemnations of Israel for violations of international law than of any other country in the region." HRW London branch director Tom Porteus replied that the organization rejected Bernstein's "obvious double standard. Any credible human rights organization must apply the same human rights standards to all countries." Jane Olson and Jonathan Fanton wrote in a letter to The New York Times, "We were saddened to see Robert L. Bernstein argue that Israel should be judged by a different human rights standard than the rest of the world ... As long as open societies commit human rights abuses, Human Rights Watch has a vital role to play in documenting those violations and advocating to bring them to an end." According to the organization, in April 2009 Bernstein brought his concerns to the HRW board of directors; the board unanimously rejected his view that Human Rights Watch should report only on closed societies, expressing its full support for the organization's work.

The New Republic published a lengthy article about HRW in April 2010, criticizing the organization for "giving disproportionate attention to Israeli misdeeds." "Robert James—a businessman, World War II veteran, and member of the MENA [Middle East and North Africa Desk of HRW] advisory committee who has been involved with HRW almost since its inception—calls the group 'the greatest NGO since the Red Cross'," but argues that it is chronically incapable of introspection. 'Bob [Bernstein, founder and former chair of HRW] is bringing this issue up on Israel', he says. 'But Human Rights Watch has a more basic problem ... They cannot take criticism'." According to the magazine (referring to Bernstein's The New York Times op-ed), "Yet, as difficult as it was to go public, Bernstein does not believe that Human Rights Watch left him with much choice. 'They think they've heard me out,' he says. 'You see, they think they've listened to me until they can't listen anymore. Actually, they haven't listened at all'." In November 2010 Bernstein delivered the Shirley and Leonard Goldstein Lecture on Human Rights at the University of Nebraska at Omaha, accusing HRW of "fault[ing] Israel as the principal offender" in the Israel–Palestine conflict and suggesting that human-rights groups were responsible for polarizing university campuses.

In her The Washington Post blog, Jennifer Rubin described HRW as "an anti-Israel group masquerading as one devoted to human rights". Orlando Radice said about his interview with Kenneth Roth for The Jewish Chronicle, "This was less of an interview than an exercise in denial, obfuscation and plain old censorship."

In an email on her last day at HRW, Danielle Haas, a departing senior editor, accused the organization of politicizing its work on the Israeli–Palestinian conflict. She expressed concern about HRW's responses to the Hamas massacres in Israel on October 7, stating that "years of institutional creep culminated in organizational responses that shattered professionalism, abandoned principles of accuracy and fairness, and surrendered its duty to stand for the human rights of all."

==== Garlasco incident ====
Senior HRW investigator Marc Garlasco has been criticized for collecting Nazi memorabilia, and Emma Daly confirmed without elaboration in March 2010 that Garlasco had resigned from Human Rights Watch the previous month. Garlasco, who wrote a book about Nazi-era medals, posted on a collector website: "That is so cool! The leather SS jacket makes my blood go cold it is so COOL!" Ron Dermer, then Benjamin Netanyahu's policy director, said about Garlasco: "A war crimes investigator who is an avid collector and trader in Nazi memorabilia is perhaps a new low." HRW issued a rebuttal, saying that the "accusation is demonstrably false and fits into a campaign to deflect attention from Human Rights Watch's rigorous and detailed reporting on violations of international human rights and humanitarian law by the Israeli government" and Garlasco "has never held or expressed Nazi or anti-Semitic views." Helena Cobban (a fellow analyst on the Human Rights Watch Middle East advisory board) said that Garlasco engaged with "people who clearly do seem to be Nazi sympathizers," which she called "extremely disturbing".

According to the organization Garlasco "covered Iraq as a senior intelligence analyst at the Pentagon", and The Guardian reported that he served in this role for seven years. He was chief of high-value targeting during the Iraq war in 2003, on the Operation Desert Fox (Iraq) Battle Damage Assessment team in 1998 and led a Pentagon Battle Damage Assessment team to Kosovo in 1999. Garlasco also participated in over 50 interrogations as a subject-matter expert.

In a piece for The National, Alan Philps wrote that "the Netanyahu government and its supporters have set out to destroy the credibility of the UN Human Rights Council and all non-governmental organisations (NGOs) working in the human rights field ... The aim is clearly to de-legitimize the organization at a time when its rights-based analysis coincides with some of the views of the US president Barack Obama."

According to Christian Science Monitor staff writer Robert Marquand, a U.N. report by "jurist Richard Goldstone, head of South Africa's Truth and Reconciliation Commission, chief prosecutor for the Yugoslav war-crimes tribunal" showed illegal white-phosphorus use consistent with Garlasco's eyewitness testimony provided to the Monitor. Marquand wrote that it was "not okay ... to use Garlasco to distract from or obfuscate findings that war crimes and crimes against humanity may have taken place in Gaza".

==== Fundraising ====
On 7 September 2010, it was announced that George Soros planned to donate $100 million to Human Rights Watch.

Journalists have criticized Human Rights Watch for requesting, encouraging or accepting financial donations in Saudi Arabia and for its fundraising methods. Critics charge that these methods include descriptions of HRW "battles" and arguments with Israel and its supporters. According to The Jerusalem Post columnist Herb Keinon and Jeffrey Goldberg, a correspondent for The Atlantic and former JP columnist, this compromises HRW's integrity. In an email exchange, Goldberg asked Kenneth Roth if funds were raised to fight pro-Israel lobbying groups. Roth answered: "The Saudis obviously are aware of the systematic attacks on us by various reflexive defenders of Israel. Everyone is", adding that these complaints are common in "discussions" during fundraisers and not exclusive to Saudi Arabia.

David Bernstein of the George Mason University School of Law wrote that something is "wrong when a human rights organization goes to one of the worst countries in the world for human rights to raise money to wage lawfare against Israel", although Inter Press Service later said that he apologized for suggesting that HRW did not also discuss Saudi human-rights abuses during the meetings.

According to Human Rights Watch, allegations that HRW had "compromised its neutrality" by meeting with Saudi donors were based on "misleading assumptions and wrong facts". HRW noted that staffers made two May 2009 presentations in private Saudi homes to people interested in the organization. Among an estimated 50 guests at a Riyadh reception, three had governmental affiliations: "the spokesperson for the Ministry of Interior; the deputy head of the Human Rights Commission, a governmental organization; and a member of the Shura Council, a government-appointed consultative body." According to HRW, none of those individuals were solicited for funds; HRW never accepts funds from government officials in any country, and there is no reason why Saudi citizens cannot legitimately want to support human rights.

HRW told Inter Press Service that the idea "that any money from Saudi Arabia is tainted because it comes from a country with a totalitarian ruling regime is a gross generalization ... The ethnic background of our donors is irrelevant to the work we do ... It's not relevant to our work in Israel that many, many of our donors are Jewish. And it's not relevant for the work that we do that we get money from Arab countries". According to the organization its work in Saudi Arabia, including "coverage of women's rights, the juvenile death penalty, domestic workers, and discrimination against religious minorities", was discussed at the receptions. HRW also said, "No other human rights group has produced a more comprehensive, detailed, and thorough body of work on Saudi Arabian human rights issues in recent years than Human Rights Watch". Although the Gaza situation was covered, HRW claimed that the coverage was justified since the Gaza war dominated worldwide headlines and is a regional issue in Saudi Arabia. Criticism of HRW as anti-Israel was juxtaposed against the accusations HRW faces in much of the Middle East that HRW is soft on Israeli human-rights violations.

In 2008, HRW issued one multi-country and five single-country reports criticizing the Saudi Arabian government. In August 2009 the organization issued a report, "Human Rights and Saudi Arabia's Counterterrorism Response: Religious Counseling, Indefinite Detention, and Flawed Trials", criticizing the Saudi Arabian government's counterterrorism program.

In 2023 MEMRI published a leaked Qatari document mentioning US$3 million donation to HRW in 2018.

==== Shawan Jabarin appointment ====
In February 2011, HRW appointed Shawan Jabarin to their Mideast Advisory Board. Jabarin has been called "Dr. Jekyll and Mr. Hyde" by the Israeli Supreme Court for his roles in the militant Popular Front for the Liberation of Palestine and the human-rights organization Al Haq. HRW's decision to include Jabarin on its Mideast Board evoked criticism.

=== Response to criticism ===
HRW program director Iain Levine said in August 2009, "If the Israeli government wants to silence critics, it should fully investigate allegations of wrongdoing and take action to end the abuses." In a Jerusalem Post op-ed piece that month, Kenneth Roth wrote that reports of recent Israeli human-rights violations had "given rise to an intense campaign by the Israeli government and some of its uncritical supporters to smear the messengers and change the subject." According to Roth, the "problem is not the messenger carrying news of that misconduct, whether Judge Goldstone or the human rights groups that have been the target of a disinformation campaign launched by the Israeli government and some supporters. The problem is the conduct of the Israeli military." According to The Times, "most" HRW Middle East staff "have activist backgrounds — it was typical that one newly hired researcher came to HRW from the extremist anti-Israel publication Electronic Intifada — unlikely to reassure anyone who thinks that human-rights organizations should be non-partisan." The Times later said that the Electronic Intifada had published the HRW researcher's articles without permission and that she "was not directly employed by that group".

In the wake of the 2009 Goldstone report, HRW accused Israel and its supporters of an organized campaign of false allegations and misinformation designed to discredit the group over its findings concerning the Gaza War. The organization tied the criticism to a June 2009 statement by a senior official in the Israeli prime minister's office who pledged to "dedicate time and manpower to combating" human-rights organizations. According to HRW, the criticism amounted to an organized effort. Attacks from different sources, with similar language and arguments, implied prior coordination. Iain Levine of HRW said, "We are having to spend a lot of time repudiating the lies, the falsehoods, the misinformation". A group of 10 Israeli rights groups accused the Israeli government of attempting to "instill fear and silence or alarm vital organizations" who were engaging in open, public discourse.

== Criticism from the Egyptian government ==
On 14 August 2014, the one-year anniversary of the dispersal of pro-Morsi sit-ins by Egyptian police in the Rabaa al-Adawiya Square and Nahda Square, which lead to clashes that resulted in 638 deaths, of which 43 were police officers, according to the Egyptian Health Ministry, HRW published a report in which it accused security forces of excessive force, in addition to claiming that the dispersal was planned at the highest levels of the Egyptian government. The death toll given by HRW ranged from 817 to approximately 1000. HRW stated that the actions of the police likely amounted to "crimes against humanity."

However, in an official statement from the State Information Service, the government of Egypt criticized HRW, alleging that the organization's report lacked transparency, ignored violence by protesters, and that it was biased in favor of the Muslim Brotherhood. As a consequence for publishing the report, executive director Kenneth Roth and Middle East and North Africa Director Sarah Leah Whitson, working for HRW, who were to publicly present the report to journalists and diplomats, were detained for hours by authorities and deported from Egypt.

In a statement from the Egyptian Interior Ministry on its official Facebook page, HRW was accused of illegally operating in Egypt without permits from authorities.

== Criticism from the Ethiopian government and local human rights organizations ==
=== 1991 – March 2018: Ethiopian People's Revolutionary Democratic Front–led Ethiopia ===
In 2009, during the period of rule by the Ethiopian People's Revolutionary Democratic Front, the Ethiopian government raised questions about HRW's methods, commissioning a report dismissing "Human Rights Watch allegations of abuses in the Ogaden as hearsay and its methods as slapdash".

In the early 2010s, the Ethiopian Human Rights Commission (EHRC) took issue with the credibility of Roth's accusations that Ethiopia's government is corrupt and uses international aid funding for "repressive purposes". The EHRC accused Roth of impartiality caused by a desire to "appease… wealthy financiers." It cited his evaluation of the Democratic Institution Program (DIP) as "superficial" and said that his allegations of corruption were based on "poor methodology." EHRC also called his recommendations a "contradiction" that called "for the promotion of human rights at the expense of human rights programs and their implementers".

== Bangladesh government's attempted prosecution of HRW ==
A special tribunal dealing with war crimes during Bangladesh's 1971 independence war with Pakistan asked Human Rights Watch to explain why it should not be charged with contempt of court for a statement from the organization that the trial of former Islamic party leader Ghulam Azam was "deeply flawed" and did not meet international standards. Azam was sentenced to 90 years in prison for war crimes. The U.S. ambassador in Bangladesh expressed concern over the prosecutors' move against the organization.

== Criticism from the Vietnamese government and state organizations ==
Due to Vietnam's position as being a one-party socialist state, the Vietnamese state is a frequent target for criticism and accusations from HRW, resulting in strong responses and criticism made by many parts of the Vietnamese government against the organization.

In 2024, commenting about racial bias allegations that were said associated to the 2023 Đắk Lắk attacks, the nation's Ministry of Foreign Affairs criticized and condemned HRW for "the factually inaccurate and fabricated information in their reports". The Vietnamese diplomat mentioned that "it was not the first time this organisation had presented such biased allegations with malicious intent against Vietnam, aiming to sabotage socio-economic development and sow discord between Vietnam and the international community".

People's Army Newspaper, the official press agency of the national military People's Army of Vietnam, declared HRW's reports against Vietnam as "obscure", "treacherous" and "baseless". The newspaper also accused HRW for backing anti-socialism organizations, aiming to execute color revolutions against existing states, while also inappropriately advocating and praising unlawful dissidents and extreme activists against the government in Vietnam. Meanwhile, the military's National Defence Journal described the organization as "absurd and bizarre", questioning HRW's qualification to self-proclaim its own functions, rights and jurisdictions to "monitor worldwide human rights situation" by "interfering in internal affairs of nations", noting that HRW is just a private organization but always tries to demand governments to do whatever satisfying its own standards and perspectives.

In 2026, following an HRW's statement, the Vietnam Ministry of Foreign Affairs called HRW's stance as "not worth commenting on".

== Ban by the Russian Federation ==
Since the ongoing Russo–Ukrainian War that started in 2014, the Office of the Prosecutor General of the Russian Federation declared Human Rights Watch on 28 November 2025 as a "undesirable organization". This law has effectively banned the activities of HRW within Russia and the occupied territories. Human Rights Watch began operating in the Soviet Union from 1978.

== See also ==
- Criticism of Amnesty International
- Criticism of Greenpeace
