= MV Polarbjørn =

Two motor ships have borne the name Polarbjørn:

- MV Polarbjørn (1974) is a 497-ton icebreaker completed on 18 January 1975, by Vaagen Verft, Kyrksæterøra, Norway. Sold in 1995 to Greenpeace, and renamed Arctic Sunrise
- MV Polarbjørn (2001) is a 4,985-ton icebreaker launched on 21 July 2001. Chartered and renamed HMS Protector in 2011; sold to the Royal Navy in 2013.
