= Kleercut =

Campaign conducted against Kimberly-Clark

Kleercut is the name of a former campaign conducted by Greenpeace, the Natural Resources Defense Council, and others towards Kimberly-Clark. It lasted from 2004 to 2009. Kimberly-Clark is the world’s largest manufacturer of tissue products, most notably the Kleenex brand. According to its annual environmental report, the company purchases over 3.1 million metric tonnes (3.4 million tons) of virgin fiber from logging companies annually. The Kleercut campaign claims that this fiber is derived from wood pulp from old growth forests. Kimberly-Clark claims that the forests in question are largely cut for timber. The Kleercut campaign claims that Kimberly-Clark support the clearcutting of such forests in Canada and the United States, including forests habitat for wolverine and threatened wildlife the woodland caribou. Kimberly-Clark has responded that many of its supplies are certified by the Sustainable Forestry Initiative or the Canadian Standards Association.

== Detailed campaign goals ==
The campaign is asking Kimberly-Clark to:

- Stop using wood fiber from endangered forests such as the Boreal forest.
- Stop producing tissue products using only virgin wood fibers and instead increase the use of post-consumer recycled fiber in all of its products.
- Utilize Forest Stewardship Council (FSC) eco-certified forestry operations for what virgin wood fibers it does use.

== Outcome ==
The result: On August 5, 2009, Kimberly-Clark and Greenpeace held a joint press conference, where the company announced that it would source 40% of its paper fiber from recycled content or other sustainable sources – a 71% increase from 2007 levels. The demand created by Kimberly-Clark for sustainably logged fiber was greater than the supply, enabling the company to convince logging companies to change their practices.

The Kleercut website read as follows:

5 August 2009: Kimberly-Clark releases new environmental policy.

The Kleercut campaign is over.

Canada's precious Boreal Forest is better conserved today. So are ancient forests around the world.

At a joint news conference in Washington DC, Greenpeace and the Kimberly-Clark Corporation, the world’s largest tissue-product manufacturer, announced an historic agreement that will ensure greater protection and sustainable management of Canada's Boreal Forest and other ancient forests around the world.

The agreement also will stand out as a model for forest-products companies worldwide.

== Grassroots efforts in the Kleercut Campaign ==
The Kleercut campaign was centered around a philosophy that an effective and engaged grassroots is needed for a successful campaign. The majority of grassroots activity pressuring aimed at Kimberly Clark occurred in Canada and the United States.

According to Greenpeace the Kleercut campaign is "one of the more successful online forest campaigns in recent Canadian history," gaining Greenpeace Canada "1,000 new [email] sign-ups each month."

Phil Radford of Greenpeace US oversaw the grassroots mobilization efforts on the campaign in the U.S. The campaign included sneaking into Kleenex commercial shoots, convincing twenty-two universities and colleges to take action such as cancelling contracts, recruiting 500 companies to boycott Kimberly Clark, over 1,000 protests of the company, mobilizing volunteers to put flyers in Kleenex boxes, and more.

== Forest Certification ==
One of the main demands to Kimberly-Clark and other large customers of Canadian logging companies operating in ancient forests is to turn to the Forest Stewardship Council (FSC), a performance based forest certification program supported by local communities, environmental organizations, aboriginal groups, and industry. Kimberly-Clark currently sources the majority of its pulp (near 3 million tons) from Sustainable Forest Initiative (SFI) and Canadian Standards Association (CSA) certified logging operations.

Forest Stewardship Council (FSC) certification has been criticized as well. While the most common criticism is that FSC is overly political, for example in Australia's forest Minister Abetz said "a limiting feature of the FSC is the involvement of environmental organizations, particularly WWF and Greenpeace. WWF and Greenpeace formed the FSC in 1994 as a vehicle to further their political objectives and to take control of forest management and its regulation away from Governments.". It has also been pointed out that: "The largest certified clearcut in the world is on an FSC certified forest in Ontario." One organization critical of FSC is Greenwood Earth Alliance who point that FSC certified forest "cover large industrial-scale operations involving massive clearcutting and even-aged management" and that at least one FSC certified company operating in Canada "engage in clearcutting, high-grading, even-aged management, overlogging, and very large scale destruction of habitat through industrial logging."
