= Greenpeace Arctic Sunrise ship case =

Protest against Arctic oil production in 2013

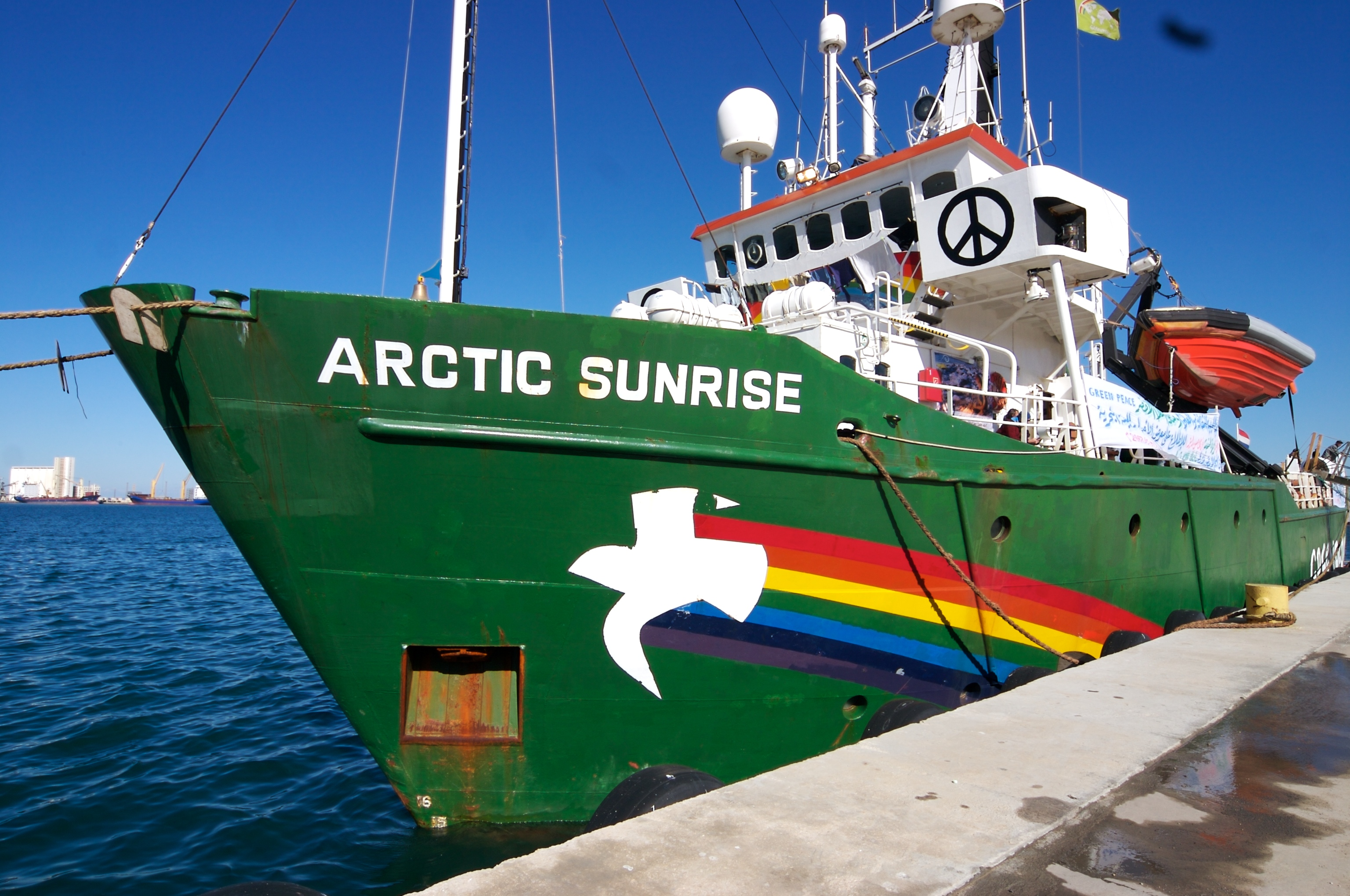
The Arctic Sunrise in 2007.

On 18 September 2013, Greenpeace activists attempted to scale the Prirazlomnaya drilling platform, as part of a protest against Arctic oil production.

The following day, on 19 September 2013, Russian authorities seized the Greenpeace ship the Arctic Sunrise in international waters in the Russian Exclusive Economic Zone, arresting the crew at gunpoint, towing the ship to Murmansk, and detaining the crew of 28 activists and two freelance journalists for three months.

The Investigative Committee of Russia opened a criminal investigation, charging the activists initially with piracy and later with hooliganism.

Since the Arctic Sunrise had been flying the Dutch flag, the Netherlands filed a case at the International Tribunal for the Law of the Sea (ITLOS case 22) and obtained an order for the release of the crew and ship pending a final adjudication of the matter.

In December 2013, despite having had ignored the ITLOS ruling, Russia released the crew anyway as part of a general amnesty adopted by the State Duma, after three months of detention. The Arctic Sunrise itself was released another six months later, in June 2014.

== Background ==
On 11 August 2013, the Greenpeace ship Arctic Sunrise left the Norwegian port of Kirkenes to begin a month-long expedition in the Arctic to protest against oil exploration in Arctic waters. The Arctic Sunrise sailed into the Barents Sea and was then refused permission three times by the Russian authorities to enter the Northern Sea Route although the refusal is in violation of international law including the right to freedom of navigation. On 23 August, Greenpeace ignored Russia's ban to protest state oil company Rosneft's operations in the Arctic and entered the international waters of the Kara Sea. On 26 August, the Arctic Sunrise left the Northern Sea Route, after the Russian coastguard boarded the boat and threatened to use force if they would not leave the international waters of the Kara sea.

== Prirazlomnaya protest, and seizure of the Arctic Sunrise and crew ==
On 18 September 2013, four RHIB inflatables were launched from the Arctic Sunrise from its position in the Pechora Sea. The RHIBs carried Greenpeace activists and crew members towards Gazprom's Prirazlomnaya drilling platform. At the time of the action, the Arctic Sunrise tweeted "We're going to try and stop the drilling.", although subsequently Greenpeace have stated that their aim was to hang banners on the oil rig to call for an end to Arctic drilling. Two activists managed to attach themselves to the platform and attempted to climb, despite being blasted with water, while another activist tried unsuccessfully to become attached to the platform. The Russian coastguard fired warning shots from AK-74 rifles and four warning shots from a cannon on board the Ladoga coastal patrol vessel. The two activists were removed from the platform and held on board the coastguard vessel, although it was unclear whether or not they had been placed under arrest.

On 19 September 2013, the day after the Prirazlomnaya protest, the Russian authorities forcibly took control of the Arctic Sunrise, which was boarded from a helicopter by fifteen Federal Security Service officers in balaclavas, armed with guns and knives. At the time of the boarding, the Arctic Sunrise was in Russia's Exclusive Economic Zone but not within the safety zone around the oil rig, and permission was not sought to board it from the Arctic Sunrise's flag state, the Netherlands. The captain was separated from the crew while other crew members and activists were held in the mess room.

The Arctic Sunrise was towed to the port of Murmansk. All of the 30 people on board were taken to a detention facility where they were brutally beaten and interrogated. In early October, the Leninsky District Court in Murmansk issued a warrant to arrest all 30 people. 22 were put in custody for two months pending an investigation and the other eight were detained for three days pending a new hearing. They were under investigation for piracy, which in Russia carries a maximum jail sentence of 15 years. On 23 October the charge of piracy was dropped and replaced by a charge for aggravated hooliganism with a maximum sentence of seven years. After they were transferred to Saint Petersburg on 12 November, the Kalininsky and Primorsky district courts released most of the people on bail, and the Murmansk Regional Court rejected an appeal against the arrests on 21 November.

According to Phil Radford, executive director of Greenpeace in the United States at the time, the reaction of the Russian coast guard and courts had been the "stiffest response that Greenpeace has encountered from a government since the bombing of the Rainbow Warrior in 1985."

== Detainees ==
The detainees were christened the "Arctic 30" by Greenpeace and the press. They included:

=== Crew by nationality ===
- US: Captain Peter Henry Willcox
- Argentina: Second mate Miguel Hernán Pérez Orsi
- Australia: Radio operator Colin Russell
- Brazil: Deckhand Ana Paula Alminhana Maciel
- Canada: Bosun Alexandre Paul, first mate Paul D Ruzycki
- Denmark: Third mate Anne Mie Roer Jensen
- France: Deckhand Francesco Pisanu
- Italy: Deckhand Cristian D'Alessandro
- Netherlands: Chief engineer Mannes Ubels
- New Zealand: Boat mechanic Jonathan Beauchamp, electrician David John Haussmann
- Turkey: Volunteer assistant cook Gizem Akhan
- UK: Communications officer Alexandra Hazel Harris, 2nd engineer Iain Rogers
- Ukraine: Cook Ruslan Yakushev

=== Activists by nationality ===
- Argentina: Activist Camila Speziale
- Finland: Activist Sini Saarela
- Netherlands: Campaigner Faiza Oulahsen
- Poland: Activist Tomasz Dziemianczuk
- Russia: Spokesman Roman Dolgov, Dr Yekaterina Zaspa, press officer Andrei Allahverdov
- Sweden: Campaigner Dima Litvinov
- Switzerland: Activist Marco Weber
- UK: logistics co-ordinator Frank Hewetson, activist Anthony Perrett, activist Philip Ball

=== Non-activists and journalists by nationality ===
- UK: Videographer and journalist Kieron Bryan
- Russia: Photographer Denis Sinyakov

== Responses ==
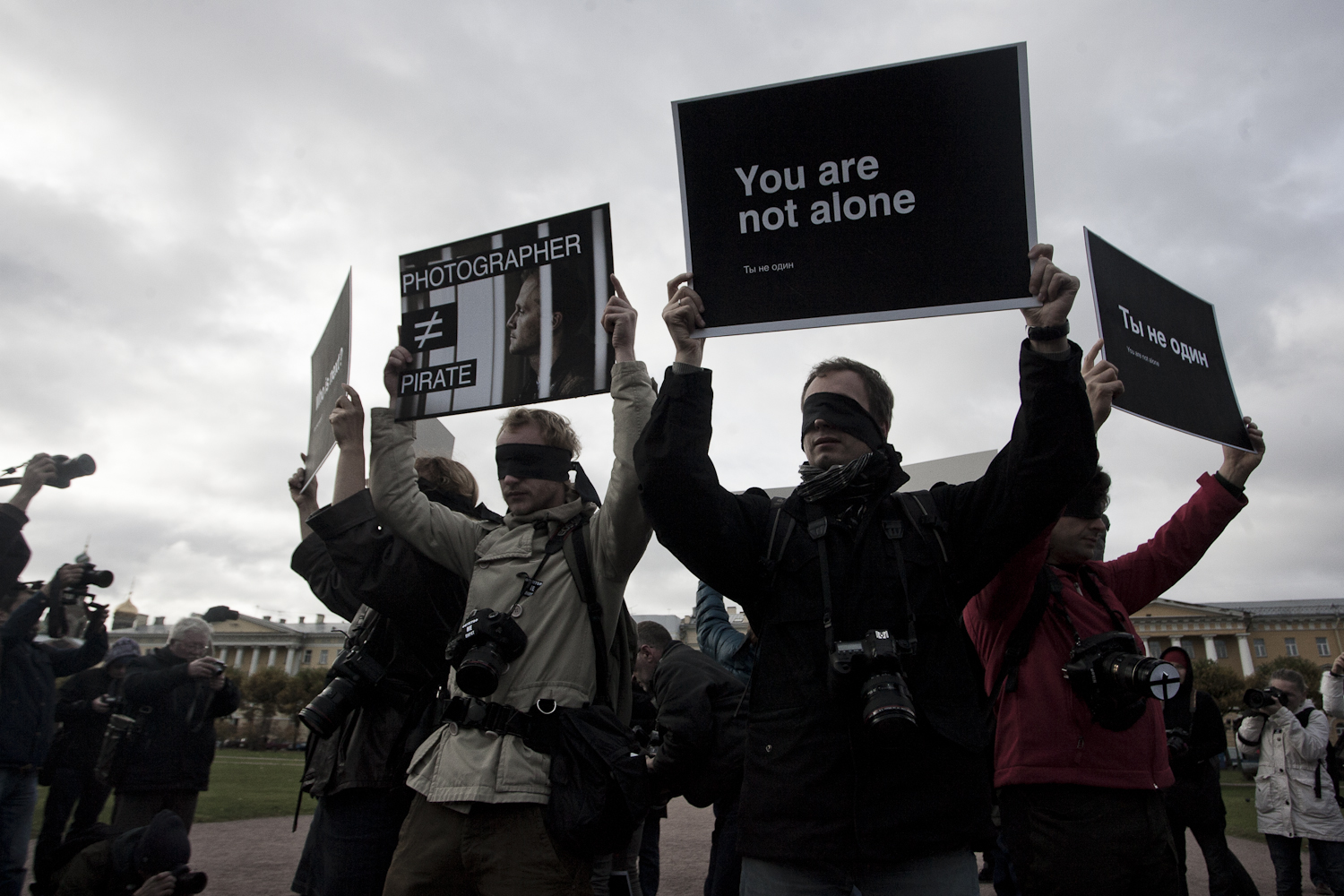
Rally in support of arrested photographer Denis Sinyakov.

One of the jailed people was the award-winning Russian photographer Denis Sinyakov, whose jailing led to protests by the Russian Union of Journalists and the international group Reporters Without Borders. According to Alexei Simonov, head of Glasnost Defense Foundation, a Moscow-based rights group, Sinyakov had only been covering the actions of Greenpeace activists in the Barents Sea and had nothing to do with the group's agenda:

"The authorities violated all norms and laws by keeping Sinyakov in prison ... I must say it again and again that Russian justice system is designed by the Kremlin not to look for real culprits to be punished but to punish and scare those who don't suit the authorities."

Sinyakov posted on his Facebook account an image of a hooded Russian coast guardsman pointing a handgun at the boat. When the first two activists were detained, Sinyakov wrote:

"I call upon you to join the struggle for freeing these activists, who sincerely see Arctic exploration as malignant."

Sinyakov was subsequently detained. The top trans-Atlantic security and rights group, the Organization for Security and Cooperation in Europe, also demanded Sinyakov's immediate release. Several Russian media outlets, including the lenta.ru site and a private but Kremlin-friendly national TV station, NTV, took all pictures off their web sites in a show of solidarity with the jailed photographer. In Paris, a few dozen Greenpeace activists protested in front of the Russian Embassy on 27 September 2013, waving banners with images of the incarcerated activists and the word "FREE" written over them. Prior to 22 November 2013, the Russian court had released all but one of the Greenpeace campaigners against bail (paid by Greenpeace) with the condition the campaigners could not leave Russia.

As flag state for the Arctic Sunrise, the Netherlands asked for immediate release of the ship and shipmates to Dutch authorities. The Dutch government argued that since the ship was outside Russian territorial waters and outside the 500-metre (1,600 ft) safety zone around the oil rig, it was in open sea, and hence outside Russian sovereign rights and jurisdiction. According to nautical law, any actions against a ship in open sea can only be conducted after agreement with the flag state. Hence, the Dutch took the position that the capture of the Arctic Sunrise by Russia had not been legal. After Russia did not release the ship, the Netherlands filed a formal case with the International Tribunal for the Law of the Sea on 21 October 2013 to order Russia to release the Greenpeace ship and the activists who had been on board.

New Zealand Prime Minister John Key raised the issue with Russian President Vladimir Putin, but said the Russian judicial process would need to run its course.

Eleven Nobel prize-winners wrote to Vladimir Putin asking the Russian president to drop charges against the Greenpeace activists and journalists.

Six men broke into the Greenpeace office in Murmansk and stole materials.

=== Legal cases against Russia ===
On 22 November 2013, the International Tribunal for the Law of the Sea ruled that the campaigners and the ship should be immediately released, and should be allowed to leave the country, against a bail of 3.5 Million Euro.

On 14 August 2015, the international Permanent Court of Arbitration unanimously ruled that Russia had acted in breach of the UN Convention on the Law of the Sea and had to compensate the Dutch government (flag state of the ship) for damages to the ship. The tribunal ruled that the actions of Greenpeace could not be labelled as piracy or hooliganism; reasons Russia had given for capturing the ship. Russia, a partner of the permanent court of arbitration, responded by stating it does not recognize the authority of the court in this case.

=== Greenpeace announcements ===
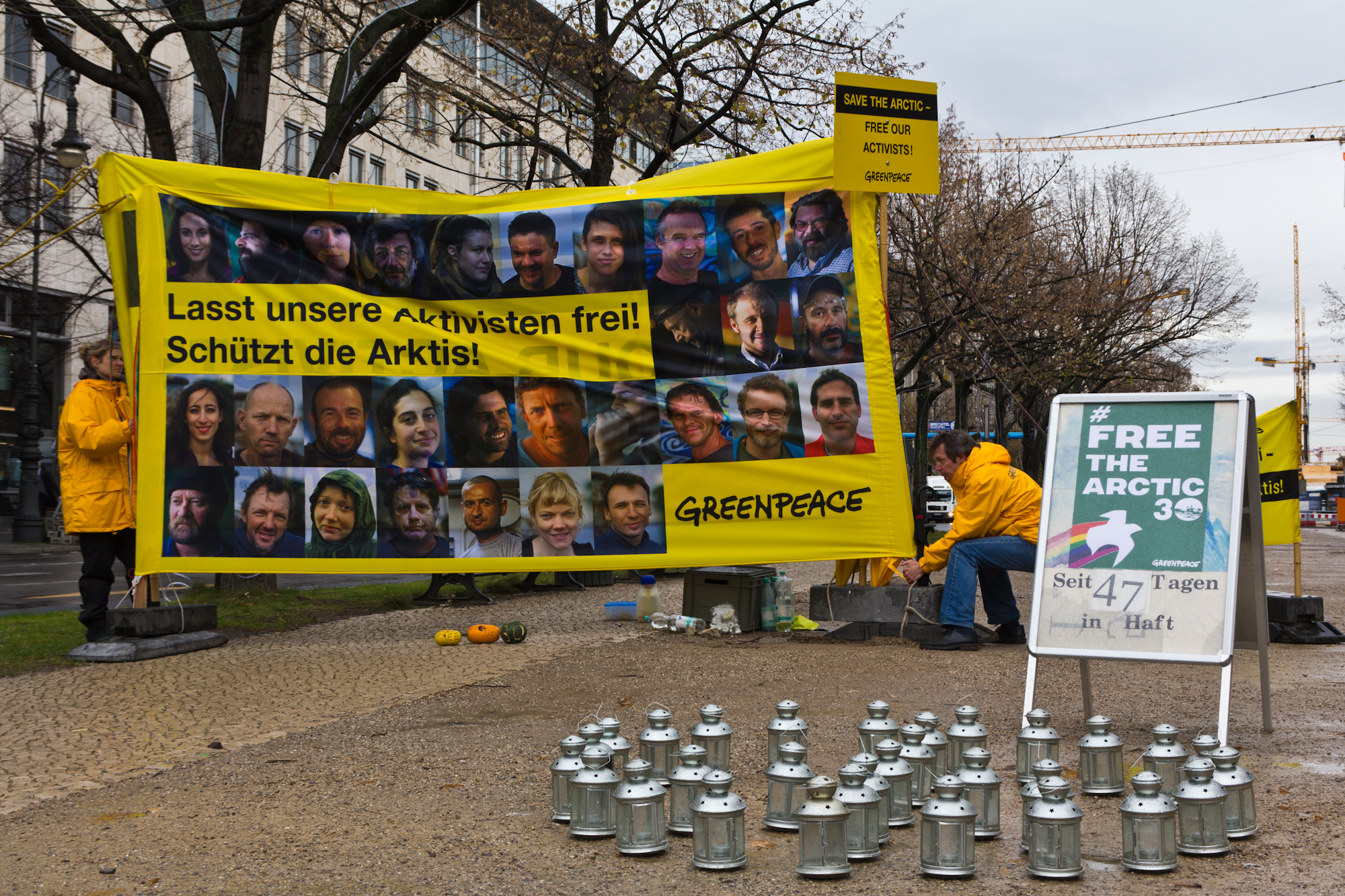
Vigil for the release of the Arctic 30 in front of the Russian embassy in Berlin.

According to Greenpeace, charges of piracy against peaceful activists have no merit in international law. Greenpeace rejected the suggestion of illegal drugs on the Arctic Sunrise. Certain pharmaceutical drugs are kept in a safe. The Russian authorities broke the safe after they took the vessel.

Phil Radford, executive director of Greenpeace USA, argued that the arrest of the Arctic 30 had been the stiffest response that Greenpeace has encountered from a government since the bombing of the Rainbow Warrior by the French secret service in 1985.

Greenpeace activists have continued to call for governments to save the arctic, the original motivation for the protest.

According to Dutch Greenpeace members, the condition of the Greenpeace ship worsened during its stay in Murmansk, as the Russian officials did not take proper care of the vessel.

=== International reaction ===
11 Nobel peace laureates wrote to Putin, calling on him to drop the "excessive" charges of piracy:

- South African Bishop Desmond Tutu
- Northern Irish peace campaigner Betty Williams
- Former President of Costa Rica, Oscar Arias Sanchez
- US peace campaigner Jody Williams
- Liberian peace campaigner Leymah Gbowee
- Yemeni peace campaigner Tawakkol Karman
- Guatemalan social reformist Rigoberta Menchú Tum
- Northern Irish peace activist Mairead Maguire
- Iranian lawyer and former judge Shirin Ebadi
- Former President of East Timor Jose Ramos Horta
- Argentine community organiser Adolfo Perez Esquivel<

German chancellor Angela Merkel expressed concerns about the arrest of the Greenpeace activists to Vladimir Putin, and urged a swift resolution of the case.

William Hague, the foreign secretary UK, negotiated with Russian ministers over the fate of the six British nationals involved.

According to Julia Marton-Lefèvre, the International Union for Conservation of Nature oil and gas exploring in the Arctic would have drastic consequences and the world should find low-carbon sources of energy.

Damon Albarn of Blur showed a poster of Frank Hewetson during the band's concert in Santiago, Chile, on 7 November 2013, asking for him to be freed.

== Dropping of charges under amnesty law ==
In December 2013, the 30 activists were all released from prison as part of a general amnesty, purportedly in celebration of the 20th anniversary of Russia's post-Soviet constitution.

== See also ==
- Arctic Refuge drilling controversy
- Climate change in the Arctic
- Green imperialism
- Save the Arctic, a Greenpeace campaign
- Sinking of the Rainbow Warrior
