= Criticism of Greenpeace =

Throughout its history, the policies and objectives of the non-governmental environmental protection and conservation organization Greenpeace have been criticized by a number of groups, including national governments, members of industry, former Greenpeace members, scientists, political groups, and other environmentalists. The organization's methods, such as the use of direct action, have also led to controversy and legal action.

== Prominent critics ==
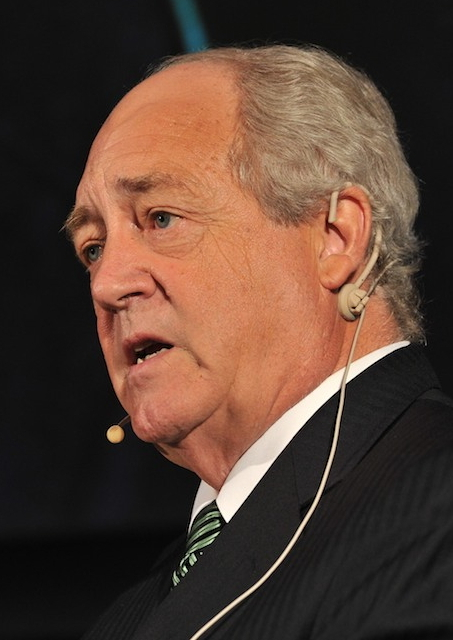
Patrick Moore's position on forests, nuclear energy, and more have consistently gone against those of the majority of Greenpeace staff.

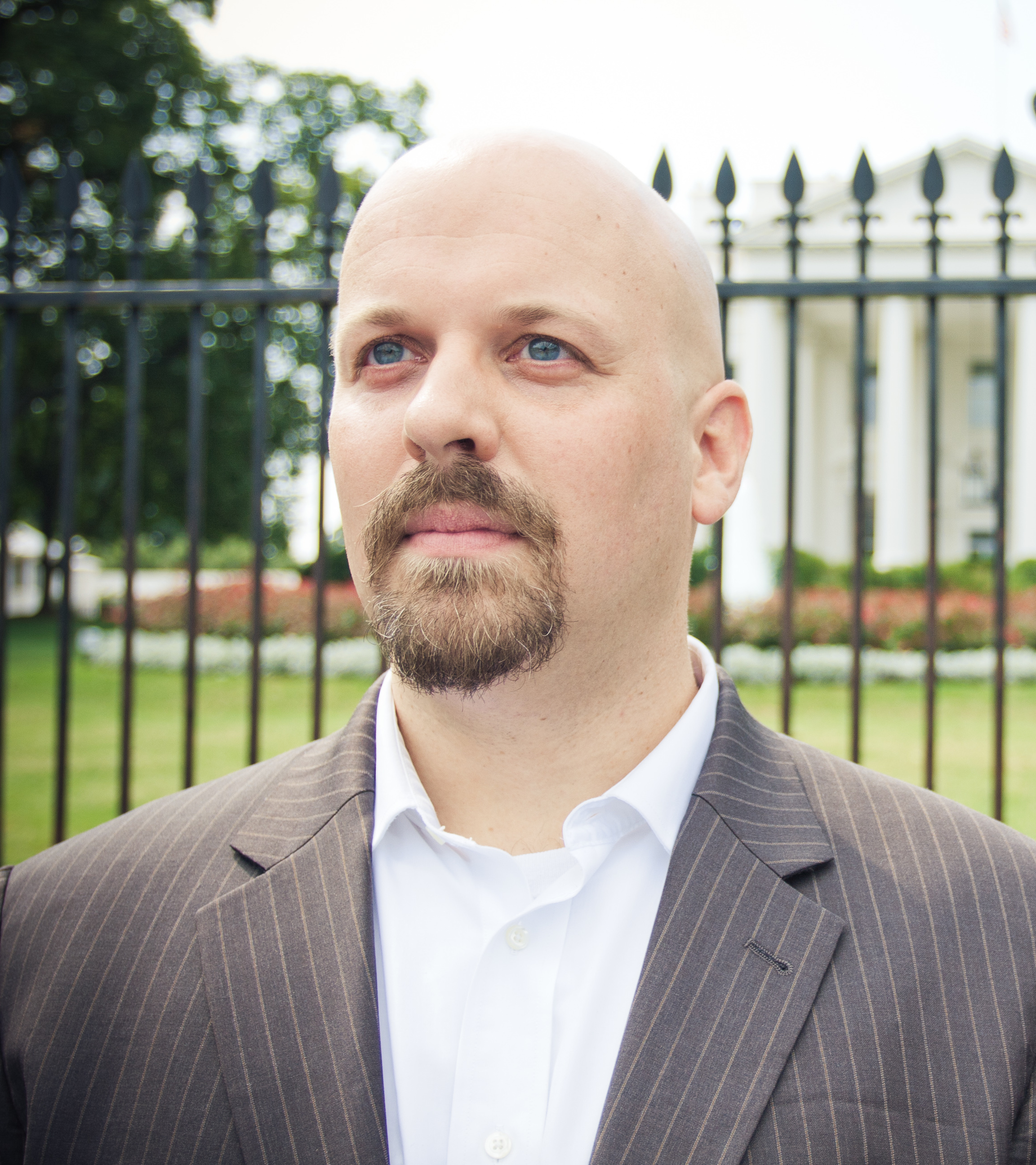
Phil Radford disputes Moore by claiming that the U.S. does not need nuclear energy.

Early Greenpeace member Patrick Moore is a critic of the organization. Moore had once spoken out against nuclear power in 1976, but has since changed his stance to support it, along with renewable energy sources. In Australian newspaper The Age, he wrote in 2007, "Greenpeace is wrong — we must consider nuclear power". He argues that any realistic plan to reduce reliance on fossil fuels or greenhouse gas emissions needs increased use of nuclear energy. Phil Radford, executive director of Greenpeace USA from 2009 to 2014, responded that nuclear energy is too risky and takes too long to build to address climate change. Radford asserts that the U.S. can shift to nearly 100% renewable energy while phasing out nuclear power by 2050.

As of 2021, 158 Nobel laureates signed a letter urging Greenpeace to end its opposition to genetically modified organisms (GMOs). The letter stated: "We urge Greenpeace and its supporters to re-examine the experience of farmers and consumers worldwide with crops and foods improved through biotechnology, recognize the findings of authoritative scientific bodies and regulatory agencies, and abandon their campaign against 'GMOs' in general and Golden rice in particular. Scientific and regulatory agencies around the world have repeatedly and consistently found crops and foods improved through biotechnology to be as safe as, if not safer than those derived from any other method of production. There has never been a single confirmed case of a negative health outcome for humans or animals from their consumption. Their environmental impacts have been shown repeatedly to be less damaging to the environment, and a boon to global biodiversity."

== Criticisms ==
=== Internal party structure ===
According to Wyn Grant, Greenpeace is a hierarchical and undemocratic organisation which allows very little control of its members over the campaigns the organisation embarks upon. For example, the criticisms Grant has given include: Greenpeace has a strictly bureaucratic and borderline authoritarian internal structure; a small group of individuals have control over the organisation in both international and local levels; local action groups are totally dependent on the central body; and the rank and file are excluded from most decisions.

=== Shell oil storage buoy ===
In 1995, Greenpeace mounted a successful campaign to force Royal Dutch Shell, co-owner of the Brent Spar oil storage buoy, to dismantle the platform on land rather than scuttling it at sea, which involved the platform's occupation by Greenpeace members. A moratorium on the dumping of offshore installations was adopted in Europe soon after the affair, and three years later the Environment Ministers of countries bordering the northeast Atlantic sided with Greenpeace, (PDF) adopting a permanent ban on the dumping of offshore installations at sea.

After the affair, it came to light that Greenpeace had overstated the amount of toxic waste present aboard the Brent Spar. Greenpeace admitted that its claims that the Spar contained 5000 tons of oil were inaccurate, apologizing to Shell on September 5. However, Greenpeace dismissed the importance of the amount of oil on board, pointing to wider industrial responsibility as the main issue at hand, as the Brent Spar was to be the first offshore installation to be dumped in the northeast Atlantic Ocean; Greenpeace claimed that it would likely have been followed by the scuttling of dozens or hundreds more platforms, setting what they consider to be a dangerous precedent. The organization went on to point out that Shell's decision to scrap the platform had been taken before Greenpeace announced the existence of an incorrect amount of toxic waste, and that their mistake therefore did not influence Shell's decision.

=== Greener Electronics campaign ===
In August 2006, Greenpeace released its first "Guide to Greener Electronics," which ranked leading mobile phone, PC, TV, and game console manufacturers on their global policies and practice on eliminating harmful chemicals and on taking responsibility for their products once they are discarded by consumers. Greenpeace encouraged manufacturers to clean up their products by eliminating hazardous substances and to take back and recycle their products responsibly once they become obsolete.

The Version 1 Guide to Greener Electronics stated "the ranking is important because the amounts of toxic e-waste is growing everyday and it often ends up dumped in the developing world. Reducing the toxic chemicals in products reduces pollution from old products and makes recycling safer, easier and cheaper." It ranked Nokia and Dell near the top, but essentially gave failing grades across the industry, ranking Toshiba thirteenth, and Apple Computer in eleventh place out of the fourteen brands. The report singled out Apple for its low rank, saying: "Already, many of the companies are in a race to reach the head of the class – that is, except for Apple, who seems determined to remain behind rather than be the teacher's pet we'd hoped for." This caught the attention of tech media news sites and was widely reported. Greenpeace gave Nintendo a score of 0.3 / 10 based on the fact that Greenpeace has almost no information on the company, which, by Greenpeace's grading system, automatically results in a zero for the affected categories.

Daniel Eran of Apple news blog RoughlyDrafted criticized the guide in an article, saying the Greenpeace guide's "ranking puts far more weight upon what companies publicly say rather than what they actually do. It is also clear that Greenpeace intended the report more as an attention getting stunt than a serious rating of corporations' actual responsibility." In response, Greenpeace attacked RoughlyDrafted's credibility, pointing out that it has in the past been called "the lunatic fringe of Mac fandom" by other bloggers after comparing the cost of Microsoft Windows and Apple's Mac OS X.

It was alleged that Greenpeace had no factual evidence, instead relying on unsubstantiated official company information for the report in order to garner publicity, as well as political and monetary support. The United States Environmental Protection Agency's 2007 report Electronic Product Environmental Assessment Tool (EPEAT) showed Apple leading the ranks in all categories. The Ars Technica website said the report "should make Greenpeace red-faced", after factual substantiation was questioned.

Greenpeace responded to the criticisms in a rebuttal also published by RoughlyDrafted. Along with the Greenpeace rebuttal, the article further presented the results of a second Greenpeace report, called "Toxic Chemicals in Your Laptop Exposed," which RoughlyDrafted called an 'apology' for the initial claims Greenpeace made in the Greener Guide rankings. While Greenpeace itself has never used the word "apology", they did restate several of their initial claims in a response to Keith Ripley, another reviewer of the report. For example, the data reported findings of minimal traces of Tetrabromobisphenol A (TBBPA), an unregulated fire retardant in the Apple computer; the Greenpeace press release said Apple "appears to be using far more of this toxic chemical than its competitors". This is despite the fact that the EU Scientific Committee on Health and Environmental Risks concluded in March 2005 that TBBPA "presents no risk to human health" and "the World Health organisation conducted a scientific assessment of TBBPA and found that the risk for the general population is considered to be insignificant."

More criticism of the statement in the Greenpeace press release followed in Greenpeace Lies About Apple on RoughlyDrafted: "The most recent report, 'Toxics in Your Laptop Exposed,' did credible scientific tests, but then threw out the data to instead present a lathered up, misleading and deceptive press release that was simply a lie. No amount of credible science is worth anything if you ignore the findings and simply present the message you wanted the data to support."

Greenpeace published an article on its website, addressing the criticism so far, with a special focus on scientific issues.

The Guide to Greener Electronics has been continually updated with new rankings of the electronics manufacturers, and as of May 2010, 15 editions have been produced.

=== Greenland indigenous complaints ===
In 2010, when Cairn Energy found initial traces of natural gas in one of its test wells that indicate the possibility of much larger hydrocarbon deposits, Greenpeace sent its ship, the Esperanza, into a stand-off with the Danish navy near Cairn's oil platforms. Many members of the community were angry with Greenpeace telling youngsters not to eat whale or seal, which the Inuit have eaten for centuries. As a result, Cairn Energy has gotten a warmer welcome than many environmentalists have hoped for. One person said this was "because it is for the greater good." A reference to the potential revenue energy exploration could bring to offset the $500 million annual grant from Denmark which could transform the economy and lead to Greenland independence.

However, Aqqaluk Lynge, from the Inuit Circumpolar Council, said an influx of foreign companies and workers could mean the natives "risk being a minority in our own country." He added that "One thing is for sure, yes Greenland has a chance to be rich, it's something that is essential for the people of Greenland to discuss and then decide if we want forced industrialisation." Greenpeace also stopped the trade of sealskin, something Greenlanders have never forgotten.

=== Neo-luddism ===
Several publications have accused Greenpeace of being anti-technology. In a 2008 editorial in the Register, Andrew Orlowski cited Greenpeace's opposition to research on nuclear fusion. Orlowski argued that Greenpeace contradicted itself by saying that fusion "will never be efficient" but also that it would pose a hazard. Other publications criticized Greenpeace's stand against genetically modified crops and the unlawful destruction of those crops by its members.

==== Nuclear fusion ====
Greenpeace claimed that nuclear fusion is unsafe and produces waste like nuclear fission. However, ITER and other organizations state that nuclear fusion does not produce long lived nuclear waste nor is there a meltdown risk because the conditions required to sustain nuclear fusion mean that if there is a containment breach, the fusion reaction would simply halt. The topic is highly debated because most forms of easily accessible fusion have extremely high neutron flux which would create highly radioactive waste and some designs rely on lithium breeding blankets to produce fuel which would also become highly irradiated.

==== Opposition to golden rice ====
In September 2013, several prominent scientists published a letter condemning Greenpeace and other NGOs for their opposition to golden rice, a type of rice that would be used in poorer countries. It is modified so that it has more vitamin A than normal rice. In the letter they state, "If ever there was a clear-cut cause for outrage, it is the concerted campaign by Greenpeace and other nongovernmental organizations, as well as by individuals, against Golden Rice."

==== Opposition to biotechnology ====
In 2016, 107 Nobel laureates signed a letter urging Greenpeace to end its opposition to genetically modified organisms (GMOs). The letter stated: "We urge Greenpeace and its supporters to re-examine the experience of farmers and consumers worldwide with crops and foods improved through biotechnology, recognize the findings of authoritative scientific bodies and regulatory agencies, and abandon their campaign against "GMOs" in general and Golden rice in particular. Scientific and regulatory agencies around the world have repeatedly and consistently found crops and foods improved through biotechnology to be as safe as, if not safer than those derived from any other method of production. There has never been a single confirmed case of a negative health outcome for humans or animals from their consumption. Their environmental impacts have been shown repeatedly to be less damaging to the environment, and a boon to global biodiversity."

=== Mismanagement of funds ===
In June 2014, media outlets reported that one employee lost 3.8 million euros by betting on fixed rate concurrency exchange when the euro was gaining against foreign currency. Internal leaked communications by Kumi Naidoo, the then executive director of Greenpeace International, indicated a "huge problem" and that the staff have "good reason" to be upset. At the same time Pascal Husting, one of the top executives of the organization, was shown to commute several times a month during a two-year period between Luxembourg, his home residence, and Amsterdam, the Headquarters of Greenpeace. This is against the organisation's view that short flights add to the CO_{2} emissions and internal policies regarding short flights. Pascal later apologized publicly.

=== Tree trunk incident ===
In June 1995, Greenpeace took a trunk of a tree from the forests of the proposed national park of Koitajoki in Ilomantsi, Finland and put it on exhibitions held in Austria and Germany. Greenpeace said in a press conference that the tree was originally from a logged area in the ancient forest which was supposed to be protected. Metsähallitus accused Greenpeace of theft and said that the tree was from a normal forest and had been left standing because of its old age. Metsähallitus also said that the tree had actually crashed over a road during a storm. The incident received much publicity in Finland, for example in the large newspapers Helsingin Sanomat and Ilta-Sanomat. Greenpeace replied that the tree had fallen down because of the protective forest around it had been clearcut, and that they wanted to highlight the fate of old forests in general, not the fate of one particular tree. Greenpeace also highlighted that Metsähallitus admitted the value of the forest afterwards as Metsähallitus currently refers to Koitajoki as a distinctive area because of its old growth forests.

=== Damage to Nazca Lines ===
In December 2014, Greenpeace came under criticism following a publicity stunt within the Nazca lines, a UNESCO World Heritage Site inside Peru. Demonstrators entered the restricted area surrounding the Hummingbird lines and laid down banners that spelled out "Time for Change! / The Future is Renewable / Greenpeace". In doing so, they tracked multiple footprints and damaged both the line itself and the area surrounding it. Peru's deputy minister for culture criticized the actions, calling them "thoughtless, insensitive, illegal, irresponsible and absolutely pre-meditated."

Greenpeace responded with apologies, claiming that demonstrators took care to avoid damage, but this is contradicted by video and photographs showing the activists wearing conventional shoes (not special protective shoes) while walking on the site. The organization stated they were surprised that this resulted "in some kind of moral offense." Conversely, they stood by "...history of more than 40 years of peaceful activism [which] clearly shows that we have always been most respectful with people around the world and their diverse cultural legacies." Greenpeace members were allowed to leave Peru without being charged. Despite Greenpeace offering to take "total responsibility", the president of the Maria Reiche Association Anne Maria Cogorno stated that the damage was "irreparable".

=== Greenpeace and Indian government controversy ===
The Greenpeace (NGO) India Society has been accused by the Indian Ministry of Home Affairs of a violation of the Foreign Contribution Regulation Act. As per the FCRA act, no NGO can use more than 50% of received funds for administrative purposes, and Greenpeace India is alleged to have used 60% of these funds for administrative purposes. Greenpeace India is challenging these allegations, and specifically the inclusion of campaign staff salaries as admin expenses.

The Intelligence Bureau of India allegedly leaked a report accusing Greenpeace of anti-development activities and a threat to national economic security. IB claims the negative impact of the NGOs’ role on GDP growth to be “2–3 per cent per annum” which affects millions of people in India living below the poverty line. The report, signed by IB Joint Director S A Rizvi, accuses Greenpeace of contravening laws to “change the dynamics of India’s energy mix”. The bureau says Greenpeace's ‘superior network’ of numerous pan-India organizations has helped conduct anti-nuclear agitations and mounted “massive efforts to take down India’s coal fired power plants and coal mining activity”. Greenpeace will take on India's IT sector over e-waste among other “next targets”, the report says. The report also accuses Greenpeace, “actively aided and led by foreign activists visiting India”, of violating the provisions of the Foreign Contribution (Regulation) Act of 2010 (FCRA). Greenpeace has focused its attention only on Indian IT firms while staying mum on multinational IT firms, the report says. The Delhi High Court overturned the government's decision to offload an Indian citizen from her travel to London – saying you cannot muzzle dissent.

=== Expulsion of Xavier Pastor from Greenpeace Spain ===
Greenpeace Spain: Xavier Pastor, a co-founder of the organisation in Spain, was expelled in 2001. Pastor saw his expulsion as a conspiracy to remove him from the organisation which accused him of leaking manipulated information to the press. Greenpeace International supported the Spanish delegation's decision. A year later, the Spanish judiciary restored Pastor's rights to remain a member of Greenpeace.
