= Prirazlomnoye field =

Oil field in the Pechora Sea

Prirazlomnoye field (Приразломное месторождение)
- Location within Russia
- Country: Russia
- Region: Pechora Sea
- Offshore/onshore: offshore
- Coordinates: 69°15′7″N 57°20′34″E
- Operator: Sevmorneftegaz
- Partner: Gazprom

Field history
- Discovery: 1989
- Start of production: 2013

Production
- Estimated oil in place: 610 million barrels (~8.3×10^{7} t)

Prirazlomnoye field is an Arctic offshore oilfield located in the Pechora Sea, south of Novaya Zemlya, Russia, the first commercial offshore oil development in the Russian Arctic sector. The field development is based on the single stationary Prirazlomnaya platform, which is the first Arctic-class ice-resistant oil platform in the world. Commercial drilling was planned to begin in early 2012, however it was delayed at least until the Spring of 2013 due to protester's "safety concerns". Safety concerns have been raised about Prirazlomnoye platform, citing use of decommissioned equipment (the 1984 TLP upper section of the rig), however Gazprom's oil spill response plan for Prirazlomnaya was renewed in 2014, and most questions found their answers. The Arctic Prirazlomnoye field produced the 10 millionth barrel of Russian North Arctic Oil in March 2016.

== History ==
The field was discovered in 1989. In 1993, the development license was issued to Rosshelf, a subsidiary of Gazprom, and the field was to be operational by 2001. In June 2000, Gazprom and German energy company Wintershall signed a memorandum on cooperation in developing the Prirazlomnoye field. Also Rosneft wanted to join the project. In 2002, the license was transferred to Sevmorneftegaz, a joint venture of Gazprom and Rosneft. Later Sevmorneftegaz became a wholly owned subsidiary of Gazprom. There is a plan to pass the Prirazlomnoye development to Gazprom Neft, an oil arm of Gazprom. The name Prirazlomnoye means "at the geological fault".

== Reserves ==
Prirazlomnoye field has reserves of 610 million barrels (97 million cubic metres).

== Development ==
The field development concept is based on the single stationary Prirazlomnaya platform. The oil platform, constructed by Sevmash shipyard in Severodvinsk, was expected to be completed by 2011 and after that the drilling would start. The Prirazlomnaya platform was equipped with the topside of the decommissioned 1984 tension-leg platform (TLP) Conoco's Hutton field, which was the first ever built tension-leg platform. Produced oil will be transported by double acting shuttle oil tankers Mikhail Ulyanov and Kirill Lavrov, built in Admiralty Shipyard and operated by Sovcomflot, to Floating Storage and Offloading vessel Belokamenka, located in Kola Bay near Murmansk. Gazprom considers to build an oil refinery in Teriberka at the location of the LNG plant of the Shtokman's development for processing oil from Prirazlomnoye and Dolginskoye fields.

The concept of the development was designed by Vniigaz Institute, a subsidiary of Gazprom. The estimated maximum annual oil production volume is expected to be 6.6 million tonnes. The total investment is expected to be about US$1.03 billion.

== The first oil from Prirazlomnaya ==
The construction of the Prirazlomnaya took almost a decade. The platform installation was towed to the Pechora Sea in August 2011, however it took 2.5 years before the production started in December 2013. In 2014, Gazprom expects to deliver at least 300,000 tonnes of Arctic crude (ARCO).

== Environmental issues ==
According to study of possible Arctic oil spill scenarios from the oil platform Prirazlomnaya completed by Russian scientists, together with environmentalists from Greenpeace and WWF-Russia Greenpeace and the World Wildlife Fund Gazprom is not prepared to deal adequately with a spill associated with oil production. The Russian Ministry of Emergency confirmed that Gazprom's oil spill response plan expired in July 2012, making any drilling the company undertakes in the Arctic illegal until a new one is submitted and approved. On 24 August 2012, a group of Greenpeace activists under Kumi Naidoo scaled the platform and put up a banner "Don't kill the Arctic".

On 18 September 2013, Greenpeace's ship Arctic Sunrise circled the Prirazlomnaya oil rig while three crew attempted to board the platform. In response, the Russian Coast Guard seized control of the ship and detained the activists. The ship was subsequently towed by a coastguard vessel to the Russian Arctic port of Murmansk. The crew consisted of thirty members from sixteen different nationalities. The Russian government has intended to charge the Greenpeace activists with piracy, which carries a maximum penalty of fifteen years of imprisonment. It was the stiffest response that Greenpeace has encountered from a government since the bombing of the Rainbow Warrior in 1985, said Phil Radford, executive director of Greenpeace USA. The Netherlands launched legal action to free 30 Greenpeace activists charged in Russia with piracy. Arctic Sunrise is a Dutch-flagged ship. Foreign Minister Frans Timmermans said the Netherlands had applied to the UN's Tribunal for the Law of the Sea, which resolves maritime disputes between states. The Netherlands view the ship's detention as unlawful.

== See also ==
- Petroleum industry in Russia
