= Xavier Pastor =

Xavier Pastor (Mallorca, 1950) is a Spanish biologist, oceanographer, and ecologist. He was one of the founders of Greenpeace Spain and president and vice-president of the organisation for the defence of the seas, Oceana.

== Biography ==
Pastor is one of the pioneers of the environmental movement in Spain. Coming from a family with a maritime and fishing tradition, he has dedicated much of his life to work in the sea and its defence. With a degree in biology from the University of Barcelona, he worked as a scientist at the Spanish Institute of Oceanography and took part in numerous fisheries research campaigns.

He was also president of the Balearic Group for Ornithology and the Defence of Nature (GOB). During his time as president of Greenpeace, he managed to make the most powerful international environmental organization known in Spain, reaching more than 5,000 members and a budget of 600 million euros. However, his work was not without controversy and he resigned from his position in 2001.

Expelled from Greenpeace in 2001, Pastor saw his expulsion as a conspiracy to remove him from the organisation which accused him of leaking manipulated information to the press. Greenpeace International supported the Spanish delegation's decision. A year later, the Spanish judiciary restored Pastor's rights to remain a member of Greenpeace.

== Selected works ==
- En defensa del medio ambiente: las propuestas de Greenpeace (Defending the Environment: Greenpeace's Proposals), Galaxia Gutenberg, 1999.
