= Energy Transfer v. Greenpeace =

Litigation between Energy Transfer and Greenpeace over the Dakota Access Pipeline protests

Energy Transfer v. Greenpeace is a series of lawsuits between the American pipeline company Energy Transfer and several Greenpeace organizations. The litigation arises from the Dakota Access Pipeline protests that took place in 2016 and 2017. The original lawsuit filed by Energy Transfer in U.S. federal court was dismissed in 2019. A subsequent state court filing the same year resulted in a judgment of $667 million in 2025, reduced by a judge to $345 million the same year. Greenpeace International counter-sued Energy Transfer for anti-SLAPP in the Netherlands in 2025.

== Background ==
The lawsuits involved the Dakota Access Pipeline which was a $3.78 billion project to build a pipeline to transport oil from the Balkan oil fields. The project was announced in June 2014 with construction beginning in June 2016. Between 2016 and 2017, protests against the pipeline took place, organized by those opposing its construction, including the Standing Rock Sioux Reservation.

== Lawsuits ==
=== 2017 federal lawsuit dismissal ===
In 2017, Energy Transfer sued Greenpeace, EarthFirst, and BankTrack in federal court in North Dakota, accusing it of racketeering and defamation for paying protestors to disrupt construction and misleading people about the project. The lawsuit claimed Greenpeace USA made false claims about the likelihood of contamination of sacred sites of the Standing Rock Sioux Tribe. The lawsuit was dismissed in 2019.

=== 2025 jury award against Greenpeace ===
A week after the dismissal in 2019, Energy Transfer filed a similar lawsuit in North Dakota state court. In 2025, a North Dakota jury ordered Greenpeace USA and affiliated entities, including Greenpeace Fund and Greenpeace International, to pay $667 million in damages to Energy Transfer.

Evidence presented during the trial included allegations that Greenpeace provided funding, equipment, and logistical support to activists at the protest site. Greenpeace was found liable for defamation, trespass, nuisance, and civil conspiracy after the jury concluded the organization had supported and encouraged disruptive and, at times, violent demonstrations that delayed construction and harmed Energy Transfer’s business relationships. Greenpeace USA and Greenpeace Fund were held responsible for $535 million of the total damages. Greenpeace has appealed the verdict.

=== 2025 Netherlands litigation ===
In 2025, Greenpeace International sued Energy Transfer in the Amsterdam District Court, seeking to declare the United States lawsuit unlawful. This is the first case brought under the EU's 2024 anti-SLAPP directive.

In 2026, the North Dakota Supreme Court issued a limited anti-suit injunction which restricted portions of the lawsuit from being relitigated in the Amsterdam court. In 2026, the Amsterdam court rejected Energy Transfer's request to dismiss the case, but also ruled that the EU anti-SLAPP directive does not apply in the case because it has not been implemented into law, leaving the litigation to proceed under ordinary tort law.
