= MV Arctic Sunrise =

Icebreaker ship operated by Greenpeace

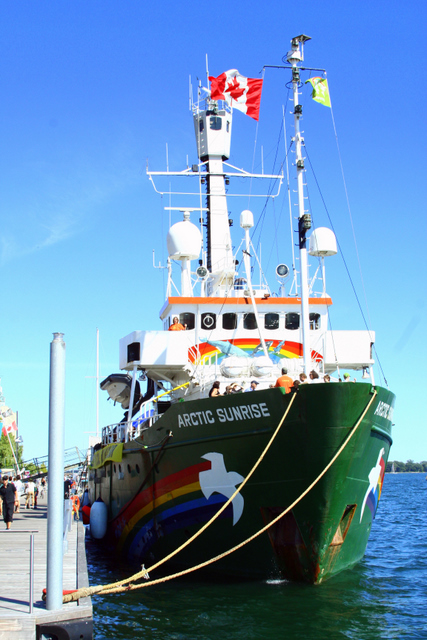
- MV Arctic Sunrise Bow

History

Norway
- Name: Polarbjørn
- Owner: GC Rieber Shipping
- Port of registry: Ålesund
- Builder: Vaagen Verft, Kyrksæterøra, Norway
- Yard number: 39
- Completed: 18 January 1975
- Fate: Sold in 1995 to Greenpeace

Netherlands
- Name: Arctic Sunrise
- Owner: Stichting Phoenix
- Operator: Stichting Greenpeace Council
- Port of registry: Amsterdam
- Identification: Call sign: PE6851; IMO number: 7382902
- Status: In service

General characteristics
- Tonnage: 949 GT; 353 NT; 610 DWT
- Displacement: 1,478 tonnes
- Length: 49.5 m (162 ft)
- Beam: 11.55 m (37.9 ft)
- Draft: 5.32 m (17.5 ft)
- Ice class: DNV Icebreaker (maximum draught 4.7 m)
- Installed power: MaK 9M452AK (1,619 kW)
- Propulsion: Single shaft; controllable-pitch propeller; Two thrusters (400 hp each)
- Speed: 13 knots (24 km/h; 15 mph)
- Crew: 16

Arctic Sunrise is an ice-strengthened vessel operated by Greenpeace. The vessel was built in Norway in 1975 and has a gross tonnage of 949, a length of 50.5 metres (166 ft) and a maximum speed of 13 knots (24 km/h; 15 mph). She is classified by Det Norske Veritas as a "1A1 icebreaker" (the second highest ice strengthening notation at the time of construction). The ship is powered by a single MaK marine diesel engine.

Under the original name of Polarbjørn ("polar bear"), she was used as a sealing ship. The vessel was subsequently used by the French government. Greenpeace purchased the ship in 1995.

== Actions ==
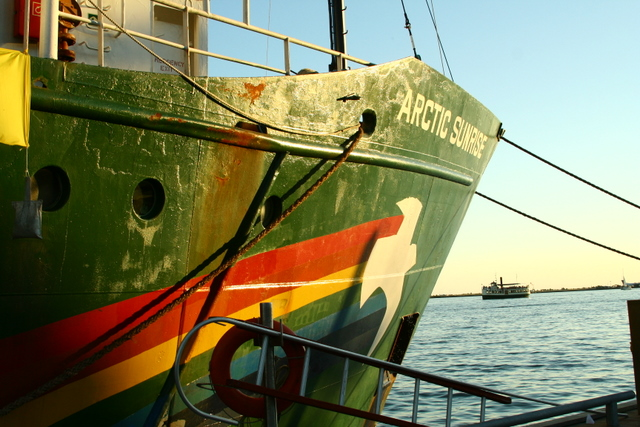

Arctic Sunrise has been involved in various campaigns including anti-whaling campaigns in the Southern Ocean. She is registered as a Motor Yacht (MY).

On 21 December 1999 Arctic Sunrise and Nisshin Maru, a Japanese whaling ship, collided. The same ships collided again in January 2006; both ships claimed to have been rammed by the other. The ICR posted video footage to support its version of the incident. Greenpeace responded that the waves emanating from Arctic Sunrise in the video support Greenpeace's contention that its vessel had its engines in reverse; Greenpeace also claimed the location of cloud formations in the background of the ICR video indicate Nisshin Maru was turning into the Greenpeace ship at the time of collision.

In June 2006, Arctic Sunrise was banned from attending the 58th International Whaling Commission meeting in St. Kitts by the St. Kitts and Nevis Government citing national security concerns. Greenpeace's protests were discussed at the same IWC meeting with agenda item IWC/58/3, relating to their protest actions against Japanese whaling in the Southern ocean in December 2005 / January 2006, during which a Japanese whaling ship and a Greenpeace ship collided, resulting in this resolution from the IWC.

On 30 August 2007, Arctic Sunrise was involved in a protest against the Canadian laker Algomarine off of Nanticoke, Ontario where she was attempting to enter harbor with a load of coal for the power station. A RHIB came alongside and activists painted the hull of the laker with "No Coal. No Nuclear. Clean Energy." Two activists then boarded Algomarine and chained themselves to the self-unloading boom. A third activist suspended herself with a climbing harness from the rudder of Algomarine, effectively halting it. The Canadian Coast Guard was called in to remove the protesters.

In early February 2007 the ship was moored in Leith docks, in Edinburgh. On 23 February 2007, she took part in a blockade of Faslane Naval Base and was subsequently impounded by the MoD police but after weeks of the ship being impounded and campaigning the vessel was released.

The Arctic Sunrise was used by protestors to board a Shell oil platform during a 2023 protest.

=== 2013 incident ===
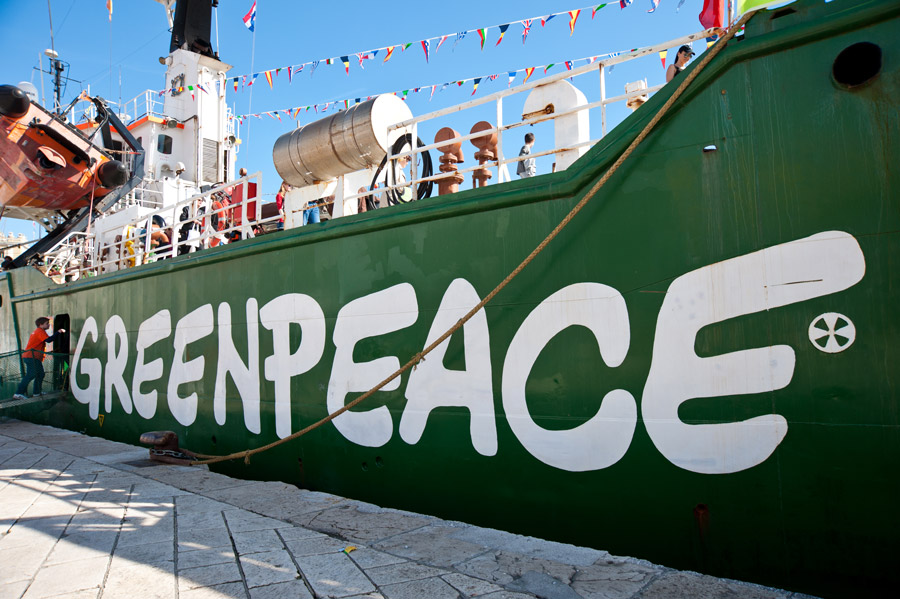
Arctic Sunrise, 2013

In September 2013, Arctic Sunrise participated in Greenpeace protests against oil drilling activities by the Russian energy company Gazprom at the Prirazlomnaya oil rig in the Pechora Sea. Greenpeace opposes oil drilling in the Arctic on the grounds that oil drilling damages the Arctic ecosystem, and that no safety plans are in place to prevent oil spills. Earlier in August 2012, Greenpeace staged similar protests against the same oil rig. On 18 September, the crew of Arctic Sunrise circled the Prirazlomnaya oil rig, while three crew attempted to board the platform. In response, the Russian Coast Guard seized control of the ship and detained the activists. The ship was later towed by a coast guard vessel to the Russian Arctic port of Murmansk. The Arctic Sunrise crew consisted of 30 members from 16 nationalities. The Russian government intended to charge the Greenpeace activists with piracy, which carries a maximum penalty of fifteen years of imprisonment, although Russian President Vladimir Putin has said the activists are obviously "not pirates". Putin distanced himself from the case and indicated that the independent Russian judiciary would continue with the investigation. On 23 October 2013 the Russian prosecution altered the charges against the activists, rescinding the piracy allegation and charging them instead with hooliganism. A conviction of hooliganism in Russia can result in costly fines and up to seven years in prison. According to Phil Radford, executive director of Greenpeace in the U.S. at the time, the reaction of the Russian coast guard and courts was the "stiffest response that Greenpeace has encountered from a government since the bombing of the Rainbow Warrior in 1985."

The Netherlands asked the International Tribunal for the Law of the Sea to order Russia to release a Greenpeace ship and the activists who were on board. Russia subsequently indicated that it would not participate in the tribunal since the matter was an issue of internal Russian law involving criminal acts against Russian property. Despite the non-appearance, the Tribunal granted provisional measures releasing the entire crew and the ship on a financial bond.

The ship was boarded by the Russian coast guard and towed 500 miles from the Pechora Sea to the northern Russian port of Murmansk in September 2013. The 30 activists were all released from prison due to an amnesty in celebration of the 20th anniversary of Russia's post-Soviet constitution, but the ship remained in Russian port pending a decision by the Russian investigative committee (IC) until June 2014.

Russia was ordered to pay damages on 24 August 2015 to the Netherlands over its seizure. The Permanent Court of Arbitration in The Hague said the amount of damages would be decided at a later date. On 18 July 2017 the International Arbitration Tribunal in The Hague ordered the Russian Federation to pay the Netherlands 5.4 million euros.

== See also ==
- Rainbow Warrior (1955), an older Greenpeace vessel that was sunk by French intelligence service in 1985
- Rainbow Warrior (2011), the third Greenpeace vessel to carry the name
- MV Esperanza, another ship operated by Greenpeace
