= Phil Radford =

American consumer and conservation leader (born 1976)

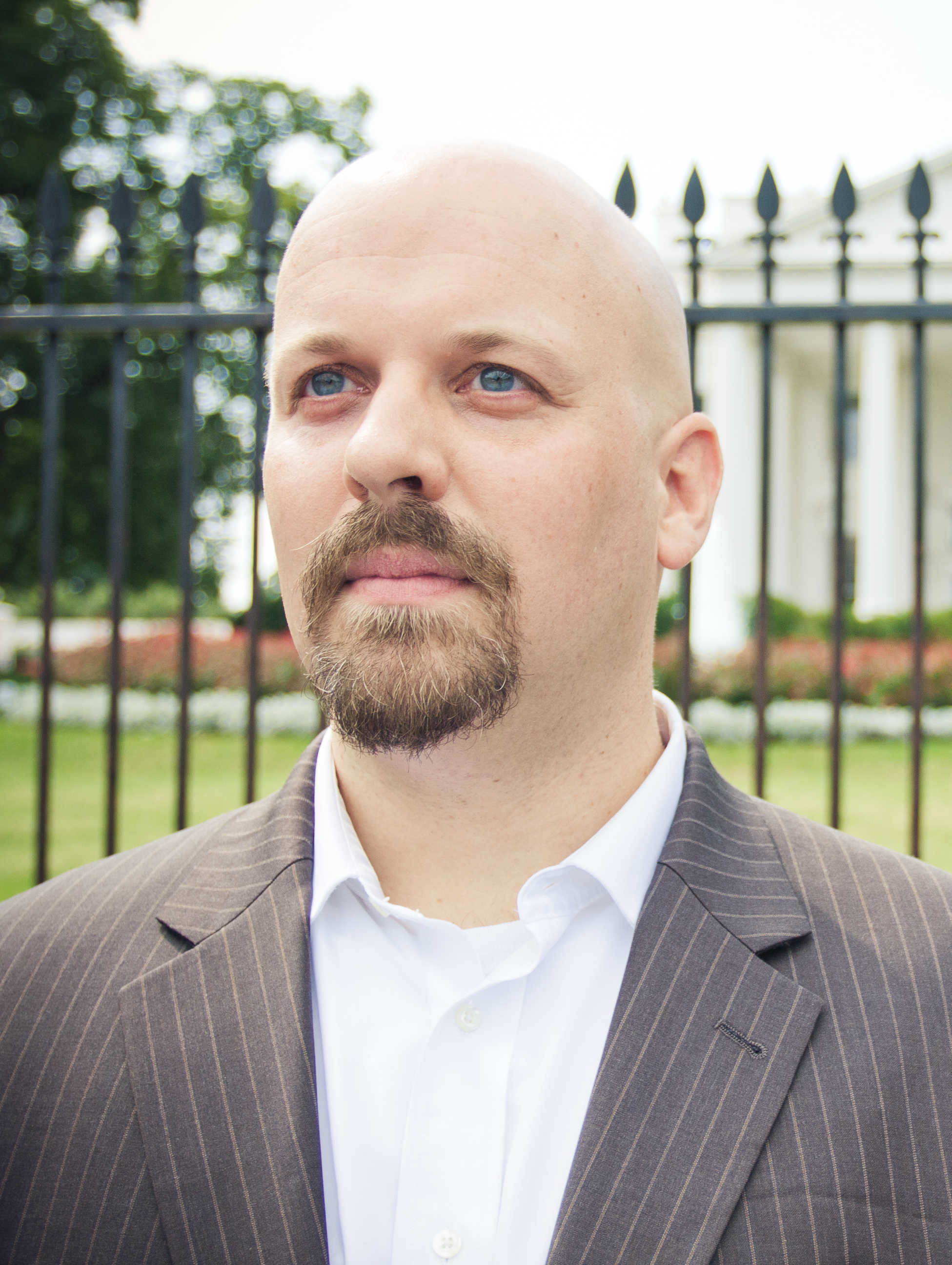
- Radford in 2011
- Born: Philip David Radford; January 2, 1976 (age 50); New Brunswick, New Jersey, U.S.
- Education: Washington University in St. Louis (BA)
- Occupations: President and CEO, Consumer Reports
- Known for: President and CEO, Consumer Reports

Philip David Radford is an American consumer and conservation advocate who is the president and CEO of Consumer Reports, a nonpartisan nonprofit organization that works with consumers to foster truth, transparency, and fairness in the marketplace. Radford began his career working with nonpartisan organizations such as the Public Interest Research Group and Public Citizen, focusing on consumer protection, fair trade, and public health initiatives. He is the former executive director of Greenpeace USA and former chief strategy officer at Sierra Club.

== Early life and education ==
Radford began his civic engagement as a high school student at Oak Park and River Forest High School in Oak Park, a Chicago suburb, organizing the shutdown of trash incinerators in the West Side of Chicago.

While attending Washington University in St. Louis, he directed campaigns and canvass offices for environmental and human rights organizations. After college, Radford had a fellowship at Green Corps, which trains young grassroots organizers.

Radford earned his bachelor's degree from Washington University in St. Louis in 1998.

== Career ==
Over the course of his career, Radford's approach to creating change has moved from activism to a more collaborative, solutions-based approach. He initially gained prominence through tactics aimed at pressuring corporations and policymakers, but since has used more pragmatic and collaborative methods that are inline with his desire for people to be safer, healthier, and wealthier.

=== Ozone Action ===
From 1999 to 2001 Radford was field director organizing grassroots campaigns for Ozone Action, an organization working on with global warming and ozone depletion.

Radford also managed the grassroots mobilization for the Global Warming Divestiture Campaign, which resulted in Ford, General Motors, Texaco, and other companies ending their funding of the Global Climate Coalition, which spread misinformation about global warming.

=== Power Shift ===
In 2001, Radford founded Power Shift, a non-governmental organization dedicated to driving sustainable energy market breakthroughs and building the grassroots base to stop global warming.

As executive director of Power Shift, Radford worked with governments in 12 cities to invest in renewable energy to improve energy efficiency in municipal buildings. Radford also helped to convince Citigroup to adopt new means of financing sustainable energy infrastructure for wind and solar installations that made them affordable to average Americans.

=== Greenpeace USA ===
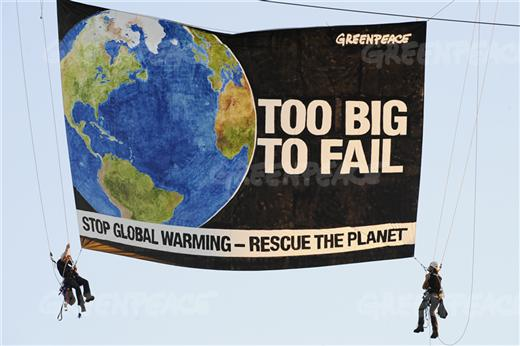
On his first day as Greenpeace executive director, Radford participated in a protest of government inaction on climate change at the State Department.

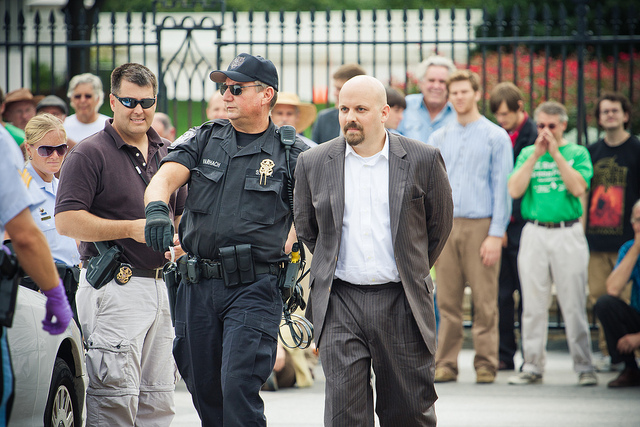
Radford arrested outside the White House during the Keystone XL Pipeline protest

In 2009, at the age of 33, Radford was promoted from grassroots director to become the youngest executive director ever of Greenpeace. During his tenure at Greenpeace USA, Radford collaborated with over 100 corporations to improve their environmental practices, focusing on joint efforts to enhance sustainability and corporate responsibility, increasing the organization's net income by 80%; growing the organization's grassroots and canvass programs; and serving as a founder of the Democracy Initiative. In September 2013, Radford announced that he would step down on April 30, 2014, once he had completed five years of service as executive director.

=== Progressive Multiplier Fund ===
After leaving Greenpeace, Radford launched the Progressive Multiplier Fund as founder and executive director.

=== Sierra Club ===
In 2023, Radford joined Sierra Club as chief strategy officer where he led the nonprofit environmental group to update organizational strategy, marketing, and policy campaigns.

=== Consumer Reports ===
In February 2025, Radford joined Consumer Reports as president and CEO.

== Influencing corporations ==
Radford has been part of initiatives to influence corporations including the Global Climate Coalition, Citigroup, Kimberley-Clark, Asia Pulp and Paper, and the tech industry. During Radford's tenure at Greenpeace, his theory of change shifted from viewing governments as arbitrators between public and private interests on environmental issues, to believing that engagement with companies first could lead to better policy. Through his career, he has worked with large companies to change their practices and become allies in pushing for improvements. Examples include Greenpeace campaigns that convinced Apple Inc. and other tech companies to shift to 100% sustainable energy and lobby utilities and regulators to make that possible.

=== Global Climate Coalition ===
Radford led a national divestment/disinvestment campaign, that resulted in the dissolution of the Global Climate Coalition.

=== Citigroup ===
In 2001, while running Power Shift, Radford launched a campaign to push Citibank to offer and promote Energy Efficient Mortgages (EEMs). In 2004, Citigroup agreed to offer and promote EEMs for residential wind, energy efficiency, and solar installations that would make sustainable energy affordable for millions of Americans.

=== Kimberly-Clark ===
Radford continued the grassroots efforts on the Kleercut Campaign to influence Kimberly-Clark to use Forest Stewardship Council-certified trees and recycled paper in its products, when he became Greenpeace's executive director.

=== Asia Pulp and Paper ===
From 2010 to 2013, Radford managed the Greenpeace team that persuaded more than 100 U.S. companies to cancel their contracts with Asia Pulp and Paper (APP) convincing APP to focus on deforestation in Southeast Asia. In February 2013, Asia Pulp and Paper announced a conservation policy protecting Indonesian rainforests.

=== Tech industry ===
On April 21, 2011, Greenpeace released a report highlighting data centers, which consumed up to 2% of all global electricity and this amount was projected to increase. Radford stated "we are concerned that this new explosion in electricity use could lock us into old, polluting energy sources instead of the clean energy available today." Business Insider reported that after Greenpeace USA campaigns, "tech giants like Apple, Google, Facebook, and Salesforce have promised to power their data centers with renewable energy, a pledge that led Duke Energy, the nation's largest power utility and one of the most flagrant emitters of CO2, to begin providing clean energy to win their business."

=== Deforestation ===
In 2014, deforestation in Indonesia, which accounts for 0.1% of the world's surface, caused 4% of global warming pollution. One of the major drivers of deforestation was clearing the forest to grow palm oil plantations. Under Radford, the Greenpeace USA team persuaded Procter & Gamble, Colgate Palmolive, Mondelez, and other major companies to demand sustainably grown palm oil.

=== U.S. supermarkets ===
Radford led a Greenpeace campaign to convince supermarket chains to stop selling threatened fish, adopt sustainable seafood policies, and lobby for policies such as marine reserves to protect the oceans. Walmart, Trader Joe's, Whole Foods, Safeway Inc., Wegmans, Target, Harris Teeter, Meijer, and Kroger implemented sustainable seafood purchasing policies to begin selling sustainable seafood. Trader Joe's, Aldi, Costco, Target Corporation, and A&P reduced the threatened fish that they sell; Whole Foods, Safeway Inc., Trader Joe's, Walmart, and Hy-Vee introduced sustainably caught canned tuna; and Wegmans, Whole Foods, Safeway Inc., Target, and Trader Joe's have lobbied for strong ocean policies.

== Bibliography ==
=== Articles (partial list) ===
- "The Case for Cooperation" May 15, 2025, Fast Company
- "Peace as the Greenpeace Way" May 7, 2009, Washington Times
- "A Philanthropic Stimulus Plan for Advocacy Nonprofits", Phil Radford, Gara LaMarche, and Sonal Shah, March 2020, Chronicle of Philanthropy
