= Rainbow (disambiguation) =

A rainbow is a meteorological phenomenon that appears as a multicolored arc when sunlight is reflected by drops of water. It is also a synonym for the visible spectrum.

Rainbow may also refer to:

== Art, entertainment, and media ==
=== Artwork ===
- The Rainbow (painting), a 1878 oil painting by American artist George Inness
- Rainbow (sculpture), a 1970 sculpture at the Lynden Sculpture Garden

=== Film, television, and theatre ===
==== Film ====
- The Rainbow (1929 film), an American film
- Rainbow (1944 film), a Soviet war film
- Rainbow (1978 film), an American made-for-television biographical film about Judy Garland
- The Rainbow (1989 film), a 1989 British drama, adapted from the Lawrence novel
- Rainbow (1996 film), a British-Canadian family adventure
- Rainbow (2005 film), a Chinese drama
- Rainbow (2008 film), an Indian film
- The Rainbow (2016 film), a 2016 Sri Lankan Sinhala masala film directed by Nalin Rajapakshe

==== Telvision ====
- Rainbow (TV series), a 1972–1997 British children's programme
- The Rainbow (1988 serial), a 1988 BBC drama based on the DH Lawrence novel
- Rainbow: Nisha Rokubō no Shichinin, a 2003 Japanese comic and animated series

==== Theatre ====
- Rainbow (musical), a 1928 Broadway musical

=== Fictional entities ===
- Rainbow (Noon Universe), a planet
- Rainbow, an organization in Tom Clancy's Rainbow Six novel series
- Rainbow Dash, a character in My Little Pony
- Rainbow Johnson, a character in the American sitcom Black-ish and Mixed-ish
- Rainbow Puppy, a character in the Nick Jr. TV series Blue's Clues & You!

=== Literature ===
- "The Rainbow", also known as "My Heart Leaps Up", an 1807 poem by William Wordsworth
- The Rainbow, a novel by DH Lawrence

=== Publications ===
- The Rainbow, literary journal edited by Aubrey Bowser

=== Music ===
==== Albums ====
- Rainbow (Boris and Michio Kurihara album), 2006
- Rainbow (Mariah Carey album), 1999
- Rainbow (Johnny Cash album), 1985
- Rainbow (Miho Fukuhara album), 2009
- Rainbow (Ayumi Hamasaki album), 2002
- Rainbow (Dolly Parton album), 1987
- Rainbow, a 1973 album by McGuinness Flint
- Rainbow (Neil Diamond album), 1973
- Rainbow (Kesha album), 2017
- Rainbow (John Handy album), 1981
- Rainbow (Sayaka Yamamoto album), 2016
- Rainbows (album), by Alexandra Stan, 2022

==== Groups and labels ====
- Rainbow (rock band), a British rock group led by Ritchie Blackmore
- Rainbow (Thai band), a Thai pop band
- Rainbow (group), a South Korean girl group
- Rainbow Records, a record label
- L'Arc-en-Ciel (The Rainbow), a Japanese rock band

==== Songs ====
- "Rainbow" (Curtis Mayfield song), 1962
- "Rainbow" (Kacey Musgraves song), 2019
- "Rainbow" (Russ Hamilton song), 1957
- "Rainbow" (Sia song), 2017
- "Rainbows" (Alice Nine song), 2008
- "Rainbows" (Dennis Wilson song), 1977
- "Rainbow", a song by Blackfoot from After the Reign
- "Rainbow", a song by Cage the Elephant from Neon Pill
- "Rainbow", a song by Colbie Caillat from her 2009 album Breakthrough
- "Rainbow", a song by Émilie Simon from The Big Machine
- "Rainbow", a song by Lynsey de Paul from the 1974 album Taste Me... Don't Waste Me
- "Rainbow" (The Marmalade song), a song by Marmalade
- "Rainbow", a song by Meghan Trainor from the 2022 album Takin' It Back
- "Rainbow", a song by Robert Plant from the 2014 album Lullaby and... The Ceaseless Roar
- "Rainbow", a song by Filipino band South Border from the 2004 album Episode III
- "Rainbow", a song by Younha from the 2008 album Someday
- "Rainbow", a song by Jay Chou from the 2007 album On the Run!
- "Rainbows", a song by Madvillain from the 2004 album Madvillainy
- "The Rainbow", a song by Talk Talk from the 1988 album Spirit of Eden
- "The Rainbow Song", a children's song sung on the television series Barney & Friends
- "Rainbow Song", a song by America on the 1973 album Hat Trick
- "Rainbow, Rainbow", a song by Peppa Pig on the 2019 album My First Album
- "Alien Hits/Alien Radio", a song by Coldplay on the 2024 album Moon Music, stylised as "".

== Brands and enterprises ==
- Rainbow, a water filter vacuum cleaner by Rexair
- Rainbow Awards, a set of LGBTQ+ literary awards in India
- Rainbow Babies & Children's Hospital, a hospital in Ohio, US
- Rainbow Bar and Grill, a bar and restaurant in West Hollywood, California, US
- Rainbow Centre, Karachi, a building in Karachi, Pakistan
- Rainbow Foods, a Minnesota grocery store
- Rainbow Media Co., an LGBTQ+ media company
- Rainbow Media Holdings, now AMC Networks, formerly a subsidiary of Cablevision
- Rainbow Room, an upscale restaurant and nightclub in Rockefeller Center, Midtown Manhattan, New York City
- Rainbow S.r.l., Italian animation studio
- Rainbow Sandals, a footwear brand
- Rainbow Shops, a fashion retail chain
- Rainbow Stores, a supermarket chain owned by Anglia Regional Co-operative Society
- Rainbow Ski Area, a ski resort in the Tasman Region of New Zealand's South Island
- Rainbow Studios, a video game developer
- Rainbow Theatre, a building in the Finsbury Park area of North London, UK

== Computing ==
- Rainbow 100, a microcomputer
- Rainbow storage
- Rainbow table, a data structure used in password cracking
- Rainbow, an application using the Okapi Framework

== Flags ==
- Rainbow flag (LGBTQ), a symbol of diversity in the lesbian, gay, bisexual and transgender communities
- Rainbow flags, flags used in various cultures and movements

== Military ==
- AGM-136 Tacit Rainbow, a missile program
- List of Rainbow Codes, a series of code names used for British military projects
- Operation Rainbow, a 2004 Israel military operation in Gaza Strip
- Rainbow, an L-class blimp given the US Navy designation L-7 in World War II
- Project RAINBOW, a CIA project
- Rainbow Sideboys, an honor guard used on aircraft carriers
- Rainbow Herbicides, a form of herbicidal warfare
- Rainbow Plans, a series of U.S. war plans
- Republic XF-12 Rainbow, a 1940s military reconnaissance aircraft
- Rainbow Division, another name for the 42nd Infantry Division of the US Army National Guard

== Organizations ==
- RAINBO, an international non-governmental organization
- Rainbows (Girl Guides), a youth organization in the UK
- Rainbow (Greece), a Greek regionalist political party
- Rainbow (Iceland), an Icelander eurosceptic and socialist party
- Rainbow Family, a loosely affiliated group of individuals committed to principles of non-violence and egalitarianism
- Rainbow Motorcycle Club, a gay men's motorcycle club based in San Francisco, California
- Rainbow/PUSH Coalition, a US political organization
- Rainbow District School Board, aka Rainbow Schools, a school board operating in Ontario, Canada

== People ==
- Rainbow (musician), member of the Birthday Massacre
- Rainbow Rowell (born 1973), American author of YA and adult contemporary novels
- Rainbow George Weiss (1940–2021), British politician
- Jeramy "Rainbow" Gritter, member of Whitestarr
- Algie Rainbow (1885–1969), New Zealand accountant and local politician
- Bernarr Rainbow (1914–1998), organist and choir master
- Randy Rainbow (born 1981), American comedian and singer
- William Joseph Rainbow (1856–1919), Australian entomologist
- Edward Rainbowe (1608–1684), Bishop of Carlisle
- Rainbow Sun Francks (born 1979), Canadian actor and songwriter

== Places ==
=== Inhabited places ===
==== United States ====
- Rainbow, Alabama
- Rainbow, California
- Rainbow, Placer County, California
- Rainbow, Ohio
- Rainbow, Oregon
- Rainbow, Texas

==== Other inhabited places ====
- Rainbow, Victoria, Australia
- Rainbow, Alberta, Canada

=== Natural formations ===
- Rainbow Falls (disambiguation)
- Rainbow Range (Chilcotin Plateau), British Columbia, Canada
- Rainbow Range (Rocky Mountains), British Columbia and Alberta, Canada
- Rainbow Springs, Florida, US

== Ships ==
- Rainbow (1837 ship), an iron paddle-wheel steamer, Birkenhead, England
- Rainbow (clipper), the first extreme clipper ship to sail in the China trade (1845)
- Rainbow (sternwheeler), a steamboat which operated in Oregon, US
- Rainbow (yacht), a J-class yacht involved in the America's Cup
- HMCS Rainbow, one of two Canadian warships
- HMS Rainbow, one of nine British warships
- MV Rainbow, a Greek ship
- USS Rainbow, a ship of the US Navy

== Other uses ==
- Rainbow (Netherlands), a 1989 alliance of Dutch political parties
- Rainbow (ride), an amusement park ride
- Rainbow BRTS, a bus rapid transit system in Pune and Pimpri Chinchwad, Maharashtra, India
- The Rainbow (magazine), a 1981–1993 computer magazine
- AIR FM Rainbow, an Indian FM radio network

== See also ==
- Over the Rainbow (disambiguation)
- Rainbow Boulevard (disambiguation)
- Rainbow Coalition (disambiguation)
- Rainbow Range (disambiguation)
- Rainbow Road (disambiguation)
  - Rainbow Road (Mario Kart), the final course in Mario Kart
- Rainbow skink (disambiguation)
- Rainbow Warrior (disambiguation)
- Rainbowman (disambiguation)
- Rainbows in culture
- Rainbows in mythology
- Runbow, a 2015 video game
