= Rainbow Mountain =

Rainbow Mountain or Rainbow Mountains may refer to:

- Rainbow Mountain (Alabama) in Alabama, USA
- Rainbow Mountain (Alaska), in the Alaska Range, USA
- Rainbow Mountain (British Columbia) in British Columbia, Canada
- Rainbow Mountain (California) in California, USA
- Rainbow Mountain (Montana) in Montana, USA
- Rainbow Mountain (Clark County, Nevada), USA
  - Rainbow Mountain Wilderness, a wilderness area centered around Rainbow Mountain near Las Vegas, Nevada
- Rainbow Mountain (Peru) in the Andes of Peru
- Rainbow Mountain (Washington) in Washington, USA
- Rainbow Mountain in New Zealand (dual official name with Maunga Kākaramea)
- Rainbow Range (Chilcotin Plateau), a mountain range in British Columbia, Canada
- Rainbow Range (Rocky Mountains), a mountain range in British Columbia, Canada
- Spectrum Range, a mountain range in British Columbia, Canada
- Rainbow Mountains (China) in Zhangye National Geopark within the prefecture-level city of Zhangye, in Gansu, China
