= State terrorism =

Acts of terrorism conducted by a state

State terrorism is terrorism conducted by a state against its own citizens or another state's citizens. It contrasts with state-sponsored terrorism, in which a violent non-state actor commits acts of terrorism under the sponsorship of a state.

Governments that are accused of using state terrorism may justify their actions as efforts to combat internal dissent, suppress insurgencies, or maintain national security, often framing their actions within the context of counterterrorism or counterinsurgency. Accused actions of state terrorism are normally also criticised as severe violations of human rights and international law.

Historically, governments have been accused of using state terrorism in various settings. The exact definition and scope of state terrorism remain controversial, as some scholars and governments argue that terrorism is a tool used exclusively by non-state actors, while others maintain that state-directed violence intended to terrorize civilian populations should also be classified as terrorism.

== Definition ==
There is neither an academic nor an international legal consensus regarding the proper definition of the word terrorism. Some scholars believe the actions of governments can be labelled "terrorism". Using the term 'terrorism' to mean violent action used with the predominant intention of causing terror, Paul James and Jonathan Friedman distinguish between state terrorism against non-combatants and state terrorism against combatants, including "shock and awe" tactics:

"Shock and Awe" as a subcategory of "rapid dominance" is the name given to massive intervention designed to strike terror into the minds of the enemy. It is a form of state-terrorism. The concept was however developed long before the Second Gulf War by Harlan Ullman as chair of a forum of retired military personnel.

However, others, including governments, international organisations, private institutions and scholars, believe the term terrorism is applicable only to the actions of violent non-state actors. This approach is termed as an actor-centric definition which emphasizes the characteristics of the groups or individuals who use terrorism; whilst act-centric definitions emphasize the unique aspects of terrorism from other acts of violence. Historically, the term terrorism was used to refer to actions taken by governments against their own citizens whereas now it is more often perceived as targeting of non-combatants as part of a strategy directed against governments.

Historian Henry Steele Commager wrote that "Even when definitions of terrorism allow for 'state terrorism', state actions in this area tend to be seen through the prism of war or national self-defense, not terror." Most states use the term terrorism for non-state actors only.

The Encyclopædia Britannica Online defines terrorism generally as "the systematic use of violence to create a general climate of fear in a population and thereby to bring about a particular political objective", and states that "terrorism is not legally defined in all jurisdictions". The encyclopedia adds that "[e]stablishment terrorism, often called state or state-sponsored terrorism, is employed by governments—or more often by factions within governments—against that government's citizens, against factions within the government, or against foreign governments or groups."

While the most common modern usage of the word terrorism refers to political violence by insurgents or conspirators, several scholars make a broader interpretation of the nature of terrorism that encompasses the concepts of state terrorism and state-sponsored terrorism. Michael Stohl argues, "The use of terror tactics is common in international relations and the state has been and remains a more likely employer of terrorism within the international system than insurgents." Stohl clarifies, however, that "[n]ot all acts of state violence are terrorism. It is important to understand that in terrorism the violence threatened or perpetrated, has purposes broader than simple physical harm to a victim. The audience of the act or threat of violence is more important than the immediate victim."

Scholar Gus Martin describes state terrorism as terrorism "committed by governments and quasi-governmental agencies and personnel against perceived threats", which can be directed against both domestic and foreign targets. Noam Chomsky defines state terrorism as "terrorism practised by states (or governments) and their agents and allies".

Simon Taylor provides a definition of state terrorism as "state agents using threats or acts of violence against civilians, marked by a callous indifference to human life, to instill fear in a community beyond the initial victim for the purpose of preventing a change or challenge to the status quo." These acts of violence can include both the types of state violence that some argue ought to be considered terrorism, such as: genocide, mass murders, ethnic cleansing, disappearances, detention without trial, and torture; and more widely accepted methods of terror including bombings and targeted killings.

Stohl and George A. Lopez have designated three categories of state terrorism, based on the openness or secrecy with which the acts are performed, and whether states directly perform the acts, support them, or acquiesce to them.

== History ==
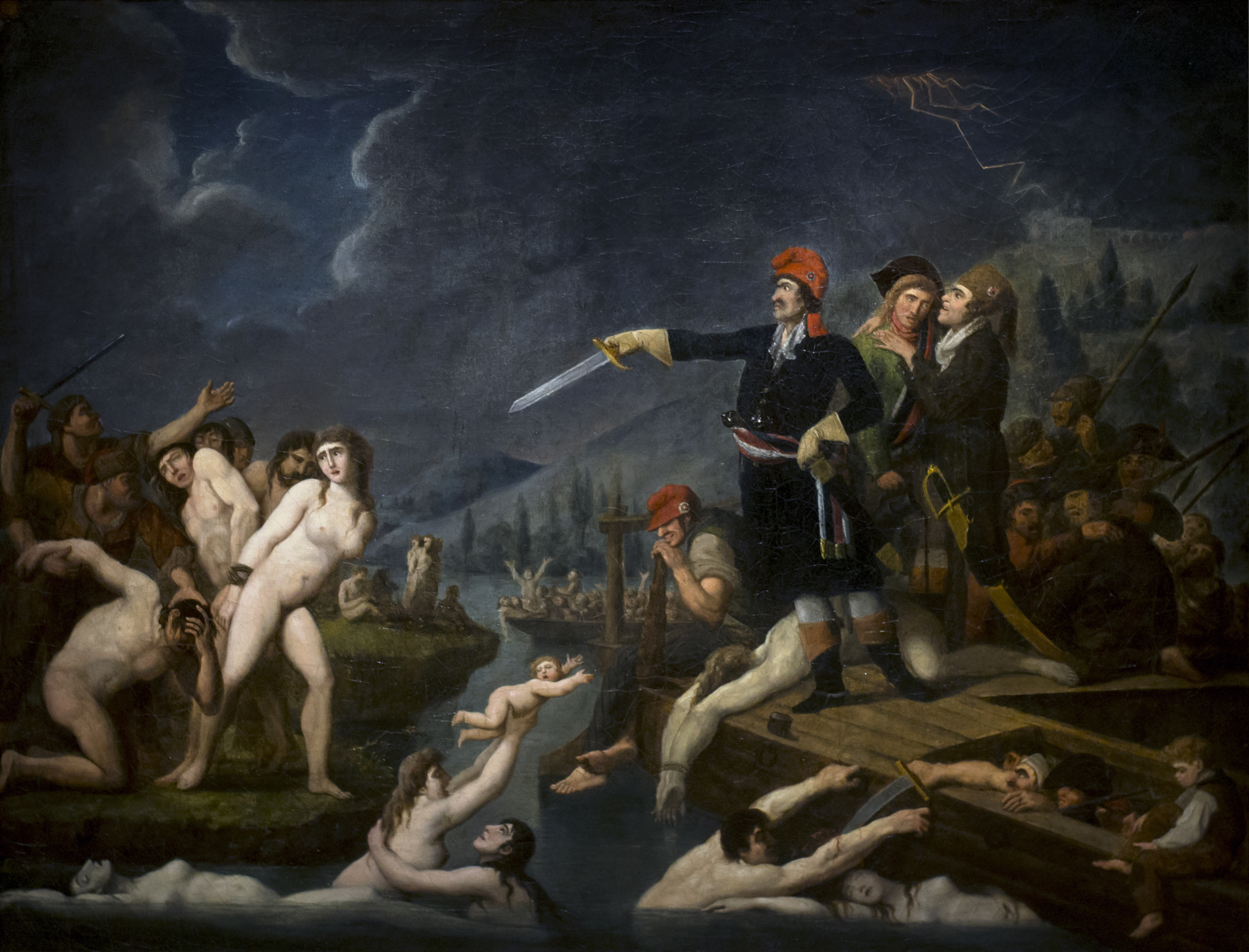
The Drownings at Nantes were a series of mass executions by drowning during the Reign of Terror in France.

Aristotle wrote critically of terror employed by tyrants against their subjects. The earliest use of the word terrorism identified by the Oxford English Dictionary is a 1795 reference to tyrannical state behavior, the "reign of terrorism" in France. In that same year, Edmund Burke decried the "thousands of those hell-hounds called terrorists" who he believed threatened Europe. During the Reign of Terror, the Jacobin government and other factions of the French Revolution used the apparatus of the state to kill and intimidate political opponents, and the Oxford English Dictionary includes as one definition of terrorism "Government by intimidation carried out by the party in power in France between 1789–1794". The original general meaning of terrorism was of terrorism by the state, as reflected in the 1798 supplement of the Dictionnaire of the Académie française, which described terrorism as systeme, regime de la terreur. Myra Williamson wrote:

The meaning of "terrorism" has undergone a transformation. During the Reign of Terror, a regime or system of terrorism was used as an instrument of governance, wielded by a recently established revolutionary state against the enemies of the people. Now the term "terrorism" is commonly used to describe terrorist acts committed by non-state or sub-national entities against a state. [italics in original]

Later examples of state terrorism include the police state measures employed by the Soviet Union beginning in the 1930s, and by Germany's Nazi regime in the 1930s and 1940s. According to Igor Primoratz, "Both [the Nazis and the Soviets] sought to impose total political control on society. Such a radical aim could be pursued only by a similarly radical method: by terrorism directed by an extremely powerful political police at an atomized and defenseless population. Its success was due largely to its arbitrary character—to the unpredictability of its choice of victims. In both countries, the regime first suppressed all opposition; when it no longer had any opposition to speak of, political police took to persecuting 'potential' and 'objective opponents'. In the Soviet Union, it was eventually unleashed on victims chosen at random."

Military actions primarily directed against non-combatant targets have also been referred to as state terrorism. For example, the bombing of Guernica has been called an act of terrorism. Other examples of state terrorism may include the World War II bombings of Pearl Harbor, London, Dresden, Chongqing, and Hiroshima.

An act of sabotage, sometimes regarded as an act of terrorism, was the peacetime sinking of the Rainbow Warrior, a ship owned by Greenpeace, which occurred while in port at Auckland, New Zealand on July 10, 1985. The bomb detonation killed Fernando Pereira, a Dutch photographer. The organisation who committed the attack, the Directorate-General for External Security (DSGE), is a branch of France's intelligence services. The agents responsible pleaded guilty to manslaughter as part of a plea deal and were sentenced to ten years in prison, but were secretly released early to France under an agreement between the two countries' governments.

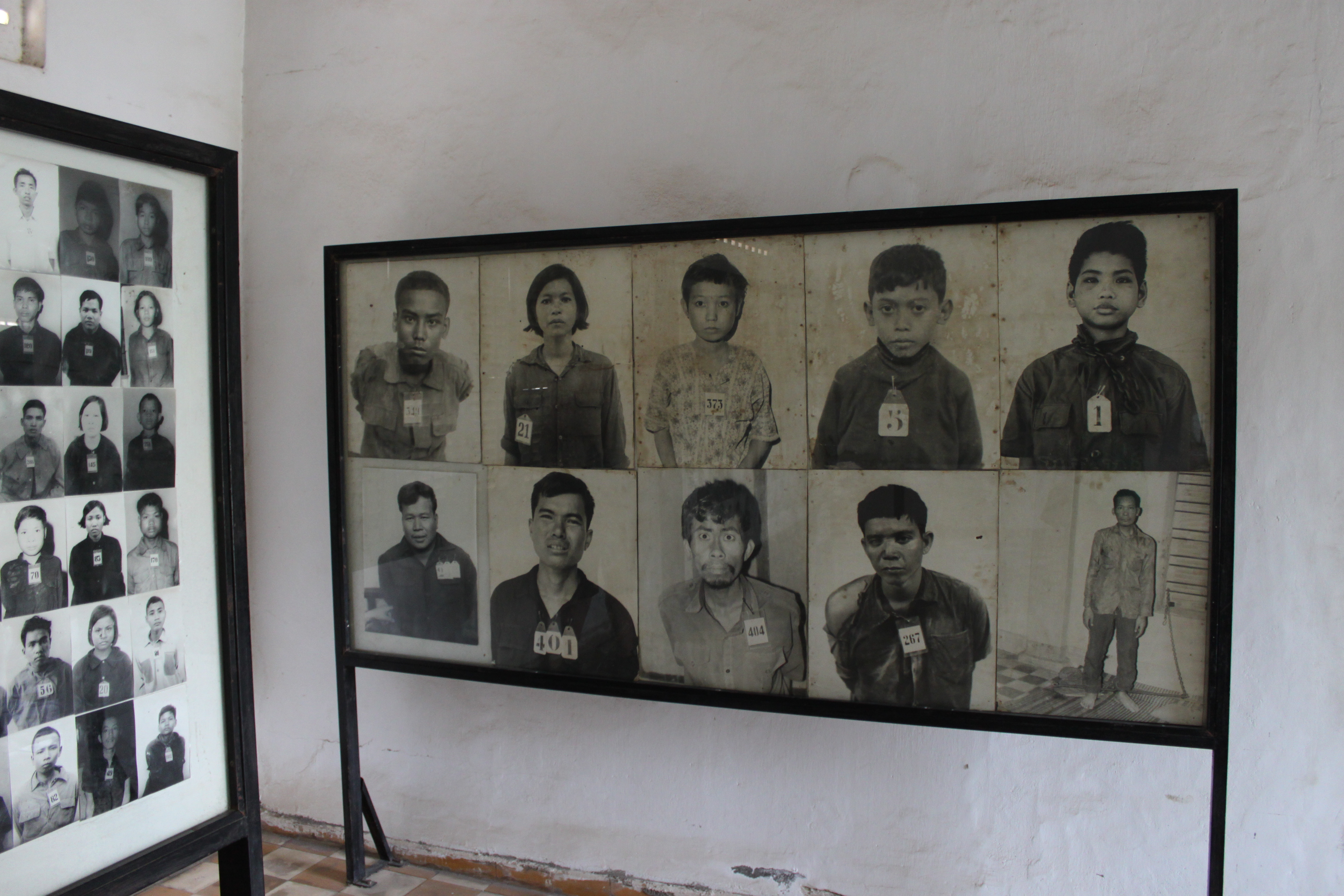
Rooms of the Tuol Sleng Genocide Museum contain thousands of photos taken by the Khmer Rouge of their victims.

During the Troubles, an ethno-nationalist conflict in Northern Ireland from the 1960s to the 1990s, the Military Reaction Force (MRF), a counterinsurgency unit of the British Intelligence Corps, was tasked with tracking down members of the Irish Republican Army (IRA). During the period when it was active, the MRF was involved in the killings of Catholic civilians in Northern Ireland.

In November 2013, a BBC Panorama documentary was aired about the MRF. It drew on information from seven former members, as well as a number of other sources. Soldier H said: "We operated initially with them thinking that we were the UVF." Soldier F added: "We wanted to cause confusion." In June 1972, he was succeeded as commander by Captain James 'Hamish' McGregor.

In June 2014, in the wake of the Panorama programme, the Police Service of Northern Ireland (PSNI) opened an investigation into the matter. In an earlier review of the programme, the position of the PSNI was that none of the statements by soldiers in the programme could be taken as an admission of criminality.

== By country ==
=== Argentina ===
The Dirty War is the name used for the period of state terrorism in Argentina between 1974 and 1983.

=== Chile ===
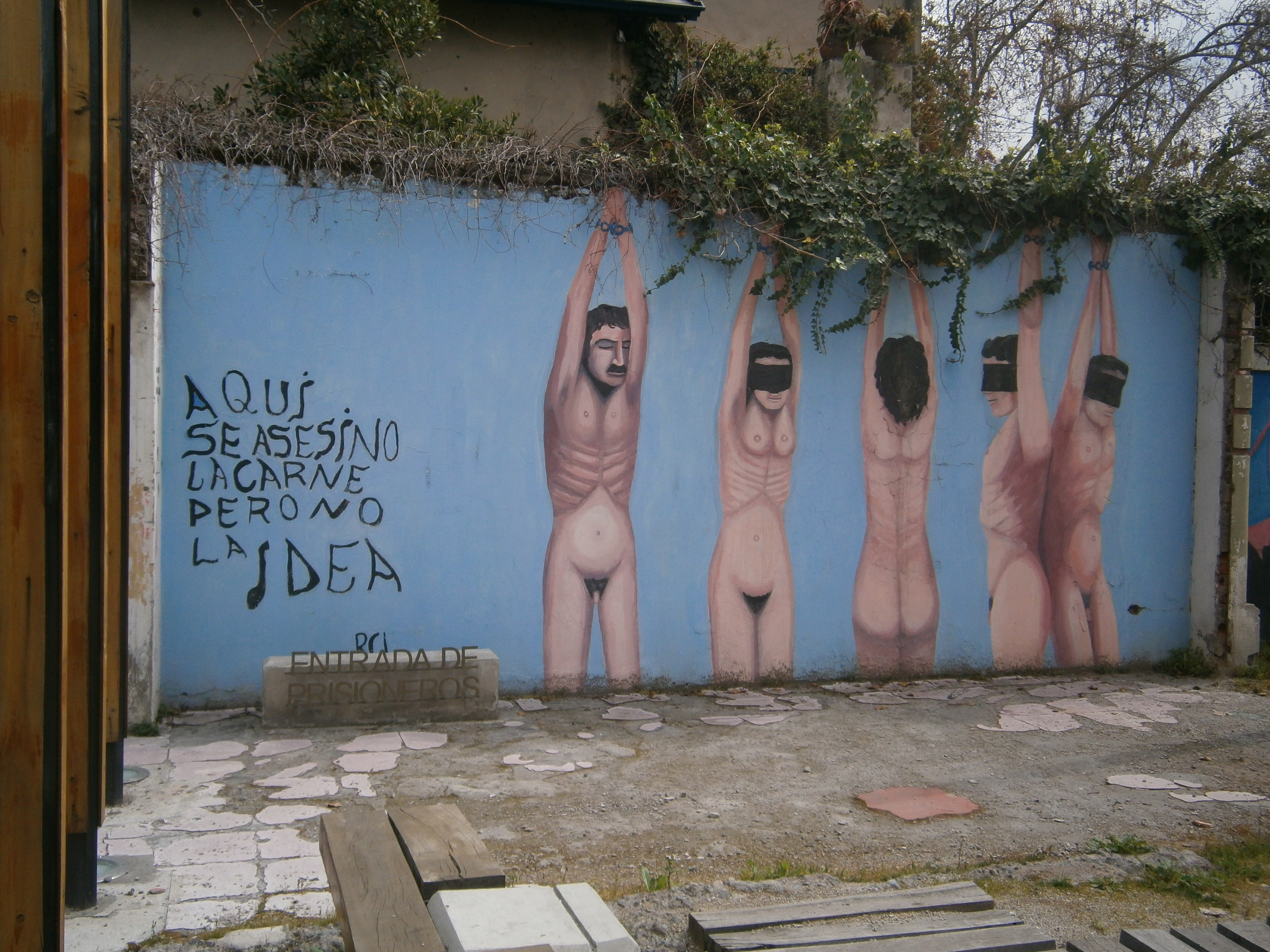
The torture center of Chile's secret police DINA at José Domingo Cañas 1367

Chile during Augusto Pinochet's rule was accused of state terror against political opponents.

=== China ===
The Uyghur American Association has claimed that Beijing's approach to terrorism in Xinjiang constitutes state terrorism. In 2006, a Spanish court opened an investigation into claims that the Chinese state was committing acts of state terrorism in Tibet. However, the investigation was dropped in 2014.

=== France ===
During the Ère des attentats ('Era of Attacks'), a period of conflict between anarchists and the French state, the latter committed false flags attacks to legitimize repression on anarchists; one of those attacks being probably the Foyot bombing.

La Main Rouge (English: The Red Hand) was a terrorist organization operated by the French foreign intelligence agency SDECE, in the 1950s. Its purpose was to eliminate the supporters of Algerian independence and the leading members of the Front de Libération Nationale (FLN) during the Algerian War, but they eventually included anticolonial activists from other countries of the Maghreb.. They orchestrated attacks on people and ships in West Germany, Switzerland and Belgium, as well as numerous North African countries, against opponents of decolonisation.

In 1960, Cameroonian anti-colonialist leader Félix-Roland Moumié was assassinated in Geneva by an agent of the SDECE (French secret service), by thallium poisoning.

On orders signed off by President Mitterand, a team of French agents sank the "Rainbow Warrior; the flagship of the Greenpeace Organisation, in Auckland Harbour on July 10, 1985, with the intention of stopping it from interfering in French nuclear testing in the South Pacific. The attack resulted in the death of Greenpeace photographer Fernando Pereira and led to a huge uproar over the first ever attack on New Zealand's sovereignty as a modern nation.. France initially denied any involvement, but investigations proved the French state was fully complicit in planning and executing the attack. In July 1986, a United Nations-sponsored mediation effort between New Zealand and France resulted in the transfer of the two prisoners to the French Polynesian island of Hao, so they could serve out their 10-year sentences (although they were released by the French after only a fraction of this), as well as an apology and an NZ$13 million payment from France to New Zealand.

=== Israel ===
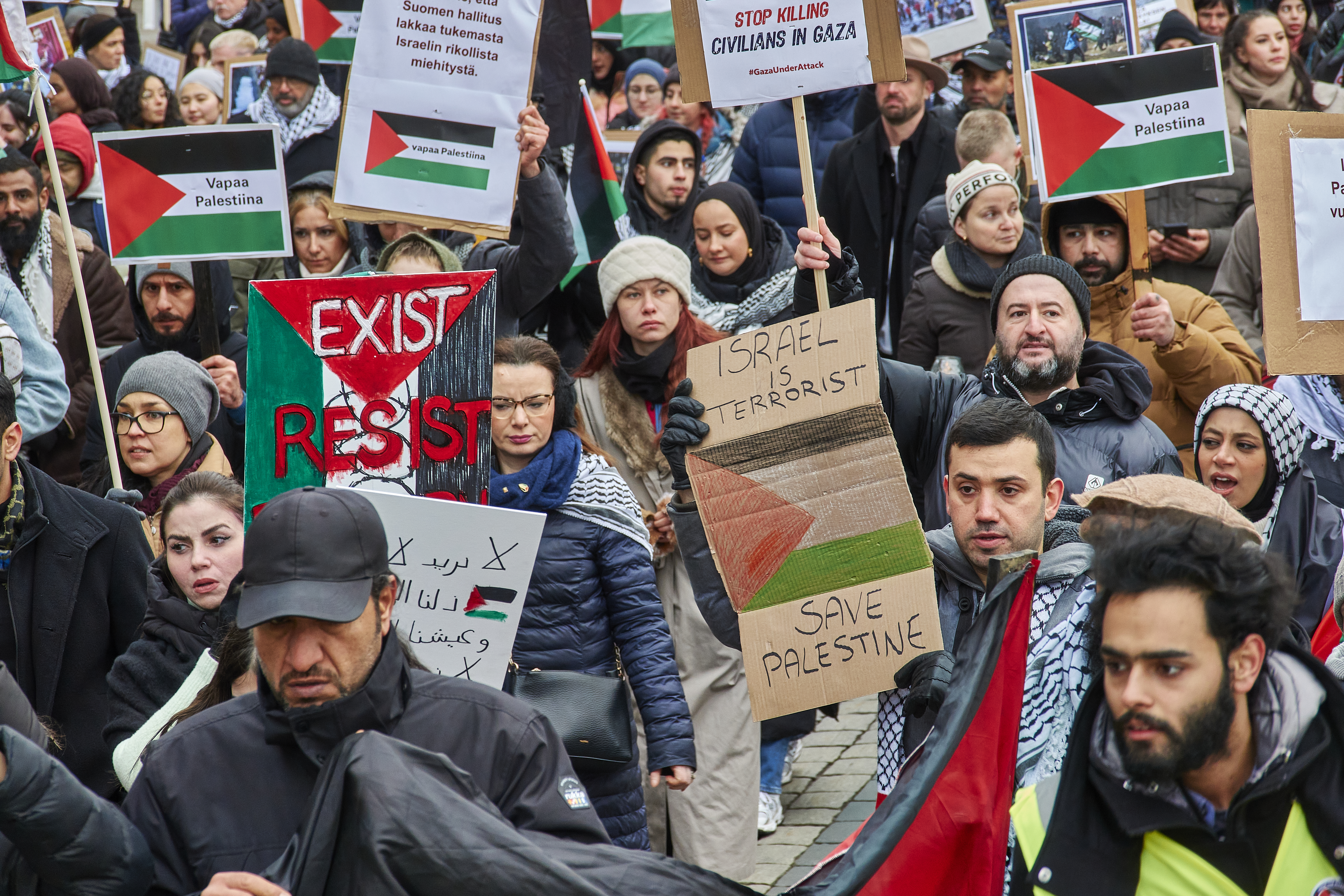
Protest in support of Palestine in Helsinki, Finland, 28 October 2023

In November 2023, Turkish President Recep Tayyip Erdoğan accused Israel of being "a terrorist state" committing war crimes and violating international law in the Gaza Strip. He said Israeli settlers in the occupied Palestinian territories should be recognized as "terrorists".

In December 2023, First Secretary of the Communist Party of Cuba Miguel Díaz-Canel condemned the genocide of Palestinians in Gaza and called Israel a "terrorist state".

The 2024 Lebanon pager explosions, which killed 39 people and wounded nearly 3,500, have been widely attributed to Israel. Iran referred to the attacks as "Israeli terrorism". Leon Panetta, the former-CIA director, also termed the attack terrorism.

Two former Israeli Prime Ministers (Ehud Olmert and Ehud Barak) joined others in making the case that the IDF not only neglects but also supports and directly participates in terrorism against Palestinians in the West Bank. They submitted a demand letter asking the Israeli government to take action to "eradicate Jewish terrorism". They state that terrorism is the "...overt policy by the Israeli government and its prime minister in general, and by the relevant ministers in particular".

=== Libya ===
In the 1980s, Libya under Muammar Gaddafi was accused of state terrorism following attacks abroad such as the Lockerbie bombing. Between 9 July and 15 August 1984 seventeen merchant vessels were damaged in the Gulf of Suez and Bab al-Mandeb straits by underwater explosions. Terrorist group Al Jihad (thought to be a pro-Iranian Shiite group connected to the Palestine Liberation Organisation) issued a claim of responsibility for the mining, but circumstantial evidence indicated that Libya was responsible.

=== Myanmar ===
Myanmar has been accused of state terrorism in the internal conflict.

=== North Korea ===
North Korea has been accused of state terrorism on several occasions, such as in 1969 in the hijacking of a Korean Airlines plane, in 1983 in the Rangoon bombing, the Gimpo International Airport bombing, and in 1987 when North Korean agents detonated a bomb on Korean Air Flight 858, killing everybody aboard.

=== Russia ===
During the Ère des attentats, a period of conflict between anarchists and the French state, the Foyot bombing was either done by the French police or by the Russian Empire's secret police, the Okhrana, which would have sought to provoke troubles in France.

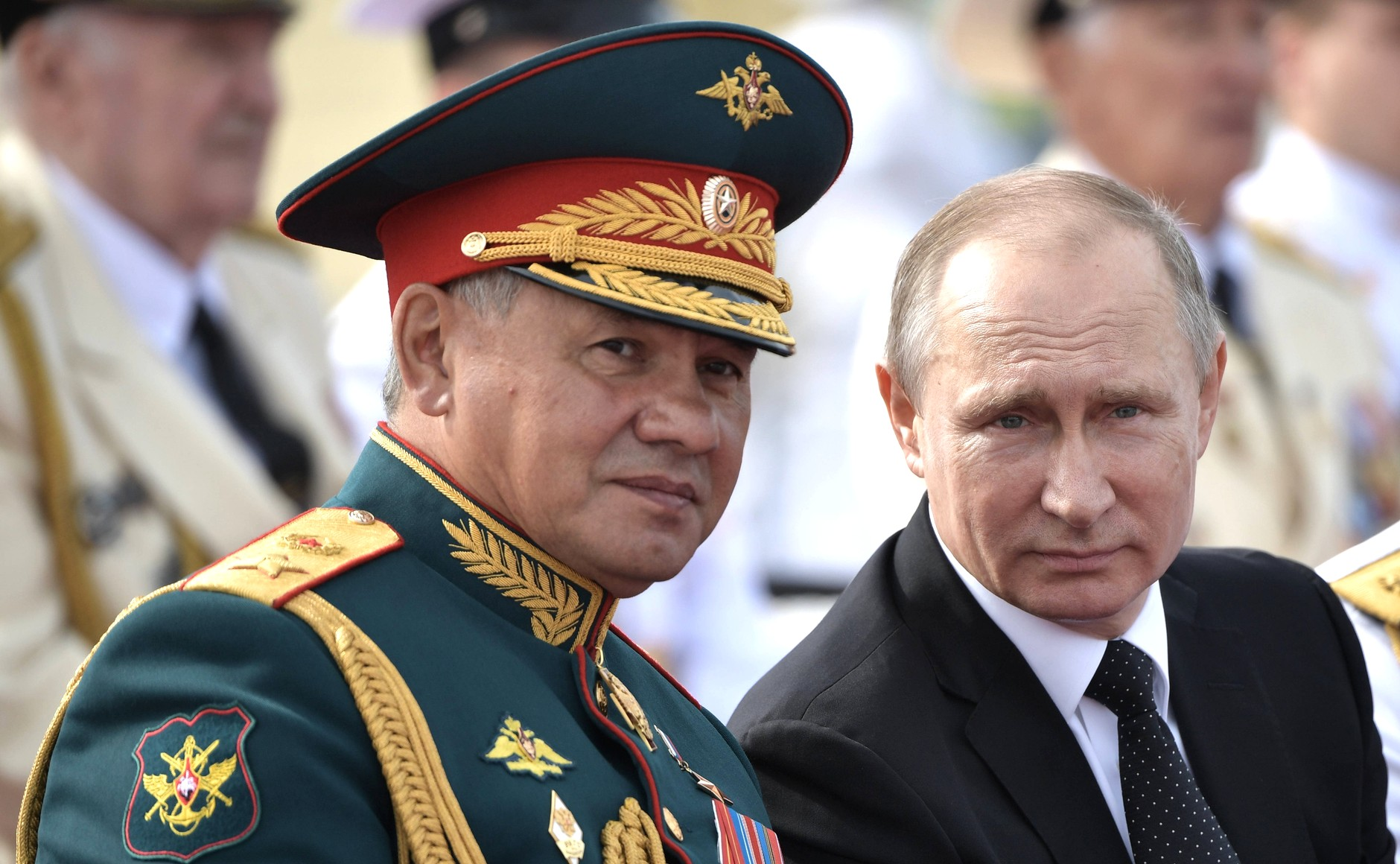
Russian President Vladimir Putin and his long-time confidant Defence Minister Sergei Shoigu

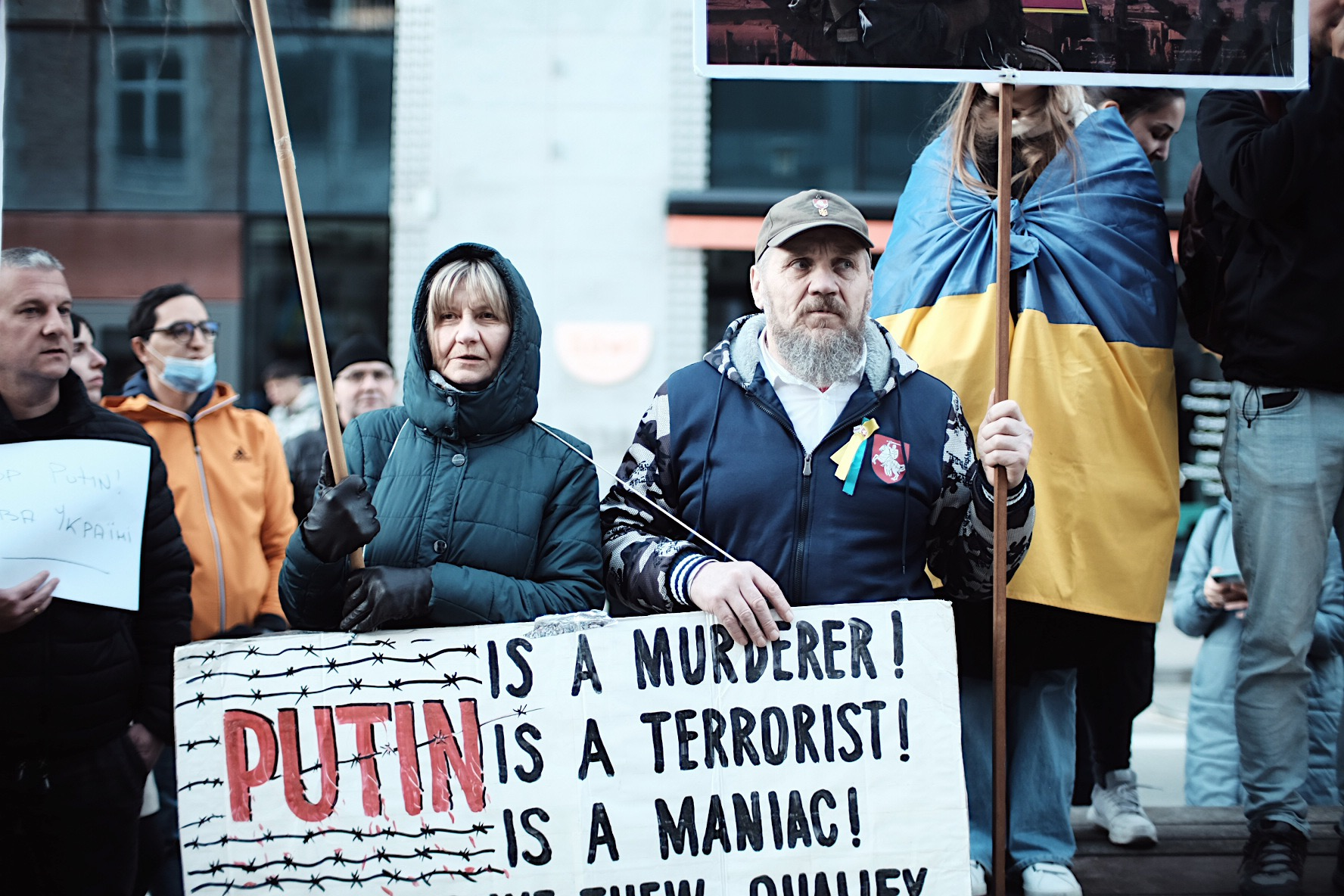
Protest against the Russian invasion of Ukraine in Brussels, Belgium, 27 February 2022

Following the February 2022 Russian invasion of Ukraine and the initial investigations into war crimes committed by Russian soldiers, there were calls for Russia to be designated a terrorist state. On May 10, 2022, Lithuania's parliament designated Russia a terrorist state and its actions in Ukraine a genocide. The US Senate unanimously passed a resolution to this effect on July 27, 2022, and the US House of Representatives is to consider such legislation. On August 11, Latvia's parliament designated Russia a state sponsor of terrorism. Ukraine's Verkhovna Rada on 20 August 2022 also designated Russia as a terrorist state. On October 17, the European Parliament approved a request to debate and vote on a resolution recognizing Russia as a terrorist state, which it did on November 23.

As of October 2023, the following states and organizations have designated Russia as terrorist or a sponsor of terrorism:

- Czechia (16 November 2022)
- Estonia (18 October 2022)
- European Parliament (23 November 2022)
- Latvia (11 August 2022)
- Lithuania (10 May 2022)
- NATO Parliamentary Assembly (21 November 2022)
- Netherlands (24 November 2022)
- OSCE Parliamentary Assembly (4 July 2023)
- Parliamentary Assembly of the Council of Europe (13 October 2022)
- Poland (14 December 2022)
- Slovakia (16 February 2023)
- Ukraine (14 April 2022)
- United States Senate (27 July 2022)

=== South Africa ===
Between 1979 and 1990, the Apartheid government in South Africa operated a branch of the South African Police known as Vlakplaas who routinely used methods of terrorism to support the state in maintaining Apartheid. These methods included the bombing of civilian buildings (COSATU House and Khotso House), and the targeted-killing and assassinations of anti-Apartheid activists.

In the Truth and Reconciliation Commission hearings, the former Major-General and Commander of Vlakplaas, Sarel "Sakkie" du Plessis Crafford gave the following three reasons for the Apartheid state's policy of extra-judicial killings:

1. "It scared off other supporters and potential supporters; it made people reluctant to offer open support; it created distrust and demoralization amongst cadres.
2. "It gave white voters confidence that the security forces were in control and winning the fight against Communism and terrorism.
3. "The information gleaned during the interrogation needed to be protected against disclosure."

The most notorious of the Vlakplaas operatives were Eugene de Kock and the askari Joe Mamasela, who were linked to several high-profile extra-judicial killings, including that of Griffiths Mxenge. Following South Africa's transition to democracy, de Kock was later tried and convicted on eighty-nine charges and sentenced to 212 years in prison.

=== United Kingdom ===
During World War II, the United Kingdom created the Special Operations Executive (SOE) which, in the words of Prime Minister Winston Churchill, was to "set Europe ablaze" with sabotage and subversion in countries occupied by the Axis powers, especially Nazi Germany. The British military historian John Keegan later wrote, "We must recognise that our response to the scourge of terrorism is compromised by what we did through SOE. The justification ... That we had no other means of striking back at the enemy ... is exactly the argument used by the Red Brigades, the Baader-Meinhoff gang, the PFLP, the IRA and every other half-articulate terrorist organisation on Earth. Futile to argue that we were a democracy and Hitler a tyrant. Means besmirch ends. SOE besmirched Britain."

British Foreign Office documents declassified in 2021 revealed that during the Indonesian mass killings of 1965–66, British propagandists secretly incited anti-communists including army generals to eliminate the PKI, and used black propaganda, due to Indonesian President Sukarno's hostility to the formation of former British colonies into the Malayan federation from 1963. British Prime Minister Harold Wilson's government had instructed propaganda specialists from the Foreign Office to send hundreds of inflammatory pamphlets to leading anti-communists in Indonesia, inciting them to kill the foreign minister, Subandrio, and claiming that ethnic Chinese Indonesians deserved the violence meted out to them.

Britain has been accused of involvement in state terrorism during the Troubles, an anti-imperialist conflict in Northern Ireland from the 1960s to the 1990s by covertly assisting loyalist paramilitaries.

=== United States ===
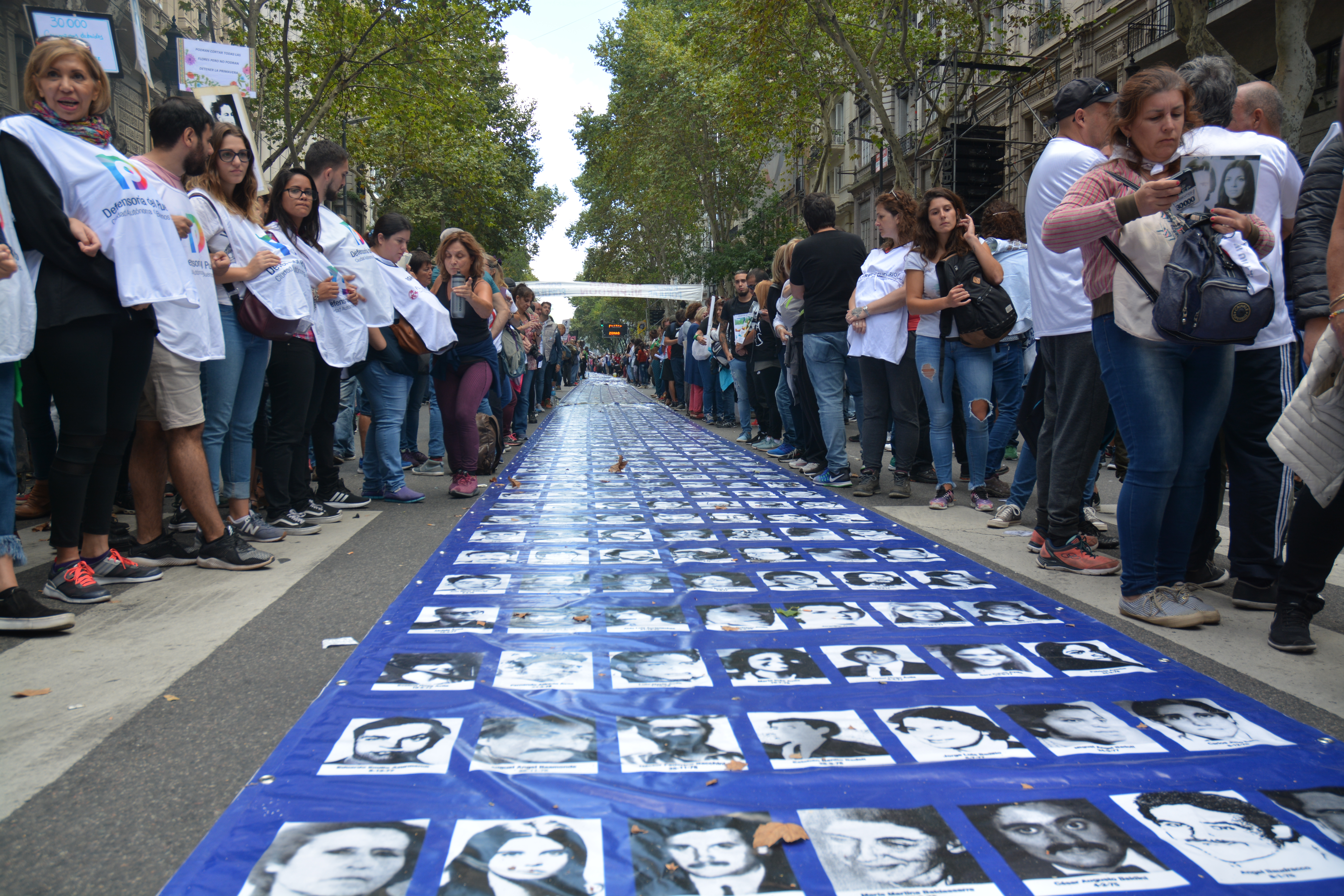
Argentines commemorate the victims of the U.S.-backed military junta on 24 March 2019.

Ruth J. Blakeley, Professor of Politics and International Relations at the University of Sheffield, accuses the United States of sponsoring and deploying state terrorism, which she defines as "the illegal targeting of individuals that the state has a duty to protect in order to instill fear in a target audience beyond the direct victim", on an "enormous scale" during the Cold War. The United States government justified this policy by saying it needed to contain the spread of Communism, but Blakeley says the United States government also used it as a means to buttress and promote the interests of U.S. elites and multinational corporations. The U.S. supported governments who employed death squads throughout Latin America and counterinsurgency training of right-wing military forces included advocating the interrogation and torture of suspected insurgents. J. Patrice McSherry, a professor of political science at Long Island University, says "hundreds of thousands of Latin Americans were tortured, abducted or killed by right-wing military regimes as part of the U.S.-led anti-communist crusade", which included U.S. support for Operation Condor and the Guatemalan military during the Guatemalan Civil War. John Henry Coatsworth, citing evidence provided by Freedom House, asserts that more people were repressed and killed throughout Latin America in the last three decades of the Cold War than in the Soviet Union and the Eastern Bloc.

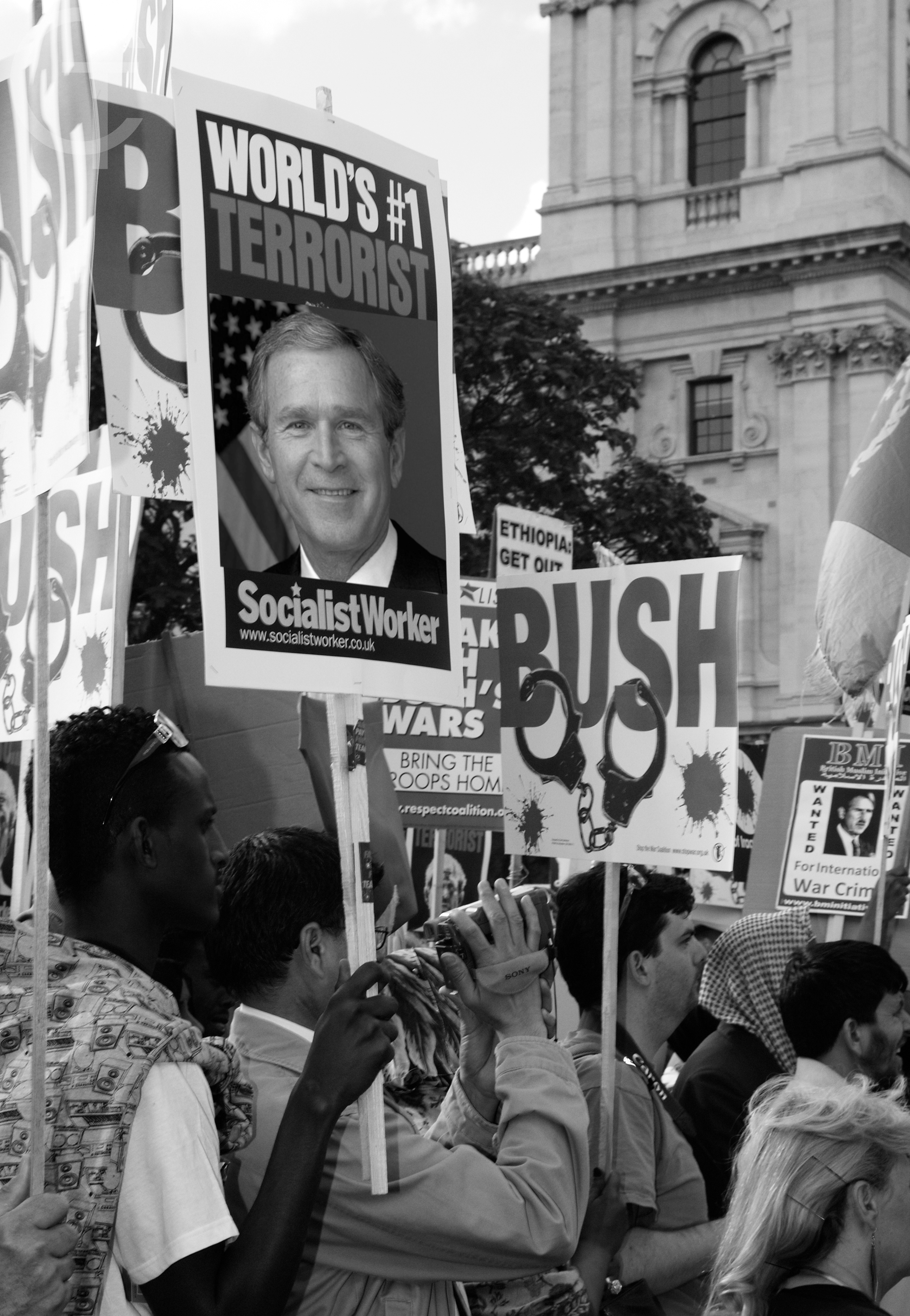
Protest against the Iraq War in London, 2008

Declassified documents from the U.S. Embassy in Jakarta in 2017 confirm that U.S. officials directly facilitated and encouraged the mass murder of hundreds of thousands of suspected Communists in Indonesia during the mid-1960s. Bradley Simpson, Director of the Indonesia/East Timor Documentation Project at the National Security Archive, says "Washington did everything in its power to encourage and facilitate the army-led massacre of alleged PKI members, and U.S. officials worried only that the killing of the party's unarmed supporters might not go far enough, permitting Sukarno to return to power and frustrate the [Johnson] Administration's emerging plans for a post-Sukarno Indonesia." According to Simpson, the terror in Indonesia was an "essential building block of the quasi neo-liberal policies the West would attempt to impose on Indonesia in the years to come". Historian John Roosa, who commented on documents which were released by the U.S. embassy in Jakarta in 2017, said they confirmed that "the U.S. was part and parcel of the operation, strategizing with the Indonesian army and encouraging them to go after the PKI." Geoffrey B. Robinson, a historian at UCLA, argues that without the support of the U.S. and other powerful Western states, the Indonesian Army's program of mass killings would not have happened.

During the second presidency of Donald Trump, media sources, politicians, and others have described US Immigration and Customs Enforcement (ICE) activities, particularly during Operation Metro Surge, as terror.

=== Venezuela ===
An Organization of American States report on human rights violations in Venezuela stated that colectivos, armed groups that support Nicolás Maduro and the ruling United Socialist Party of Venezuela (PSUV) party, murdered at least 131 individuals between 2014 and 2017 during anti-government protests.

The National Assembly of Venezuela designated the colectivos as terrorist groups due to their "violence, paramilitary actions, intimidation, murders and other crimes", declaring their acts as state-sponsored terrorism.

== Casualties ==
According to certain terrorism studies scholars and analysts, state terrorism, with its institutionalized instrumentation of terrorist atrocities through massacres, genocides, forced disappearances, carpet bombings, torture and sponsorship of death squads, is a deadlier form of terrorism than non-state terrorism.

== Criticism of the concept ==
The chairman of the United Nations Counter-Terrorism Committee has said the twelve previous international conventions on terrorism had never referred to state terrorism, which was not an international legal concept, and when states abuse their powers they should be judged against international conventions which deal with war crimes, international human rights law, and international humanitarian law, rather than international anti-terrorism statutes. In a similar vein, Kofi Annan, at the time the United Nations Secretary-General, said it is "time to set aside debates on so-called 'state terrorism'. The use of force by states is already regulated under international law". Annan added, "regardless of the differences between governments on the question of the definition of terrorism, what is clear and what we can all agree on is any deliberate attack on innocent civilians [or non-combatants], regardless of one's cause, is unacceptable and fits into the definition of terrorism."

Dr. Bruce Hoffman has argued that failing to differentiate between state and non-state violence ignores the fact that there is a "fundamental qualitative difference between the two types of violence". Hoffman argues that even in war, there are rules and accepted norms of behaviour that prohibit certain types of weapons and tactics and outlaw attacks on specific categories of targets. For instance, rules which are codified in the Geneva and Hague Conventions on warfare prohibit taking civilians as hostages, outlaw reprisals against either civilians or POWs, recognise neutral territory, etc. Hoffman says "even the most cursory review of terrorist tactics and targets over the past quarter century reveals that terrorists have violated all these rules." Hoffman also says that when states transgress these rules of war "the term 'war crime' is used to describe such acts".

Walter Laqueur has said those who argue that state terrorism should be included in studies of terrorism ignore the fact that "The very existence of a state is based on its monopoly of power. If it were different, states would not have the right, nor would they be in a position, to maintain that minimum of order on which all civilized life rests." Calling the concept a "red herring", he stated: "This argument has been used by the terrorists themselves, arguing that there is no difference between their activities and those by governments and states. It has also been employed by some sympathizers, and it rests on the deliberate obfuscation between all kinds of violence ..."

== See also ==
- History of terrorism
- Political repression
- State violence
- State sponsors of terrorism
- War crime

== Bibliography ==
- Barsamian, David (2001). "The United States is a Leading Terrorist State". Monthly Review.
- Kisangani, E. & Nafziger, E. Wayne (2007). "The Political Economy Of State Terror" (PDF). Defence and Peace Economics. 18 (5): 405–414. doi:10.1080/10242690701455433. S2CID 155020309.
- Martin, Gus (2006). Understanding terrorism: challenges, perspectives, and issues. SAGE. ISBN 978-1-4129-2722-2.
- Nairn, Tom; James, Paul (2005). Global Matrix: Nationalism, Globalism and State-Terrorism. London and New York: Pluto Press.
- Primoratz, Igor (2004). "State Terrorism and Counter-Terrorism". In Primoratz, Igor (ed.). Terrorism: The Philosophical Issues. Palgrave Macmillan. ISBN 978-1-4039-1817-8.
- Selden, Mark; So, Alvin Y., eds. (2004). War and state terrorism: the United States, Japan, and the Asia–Pacific in the long twentieth century. Rowman & Littlefield. ISBN 978-0-7425-2391-3.
- Sluka, Jeffrey A. (2000). Death Squad: The Anthropology of State Terror. University of Pennsylvania Press. ISBN 978-0-8122-1711-7.
- Stohl, Michael & Lopez, George A. (1988). Terrible beyond Endurance?: The Foreign Policy of State Terrorism. Greenwood Press. ISBN 978-0-313-25297-6.
- Taylor, Simon David (2021). "Status Quo Terrorism: State-Terrorism in South Africa during Apartheid". Terrorism & Political Violence.
