= Nahid Toubia =

Sudanese surgeon and women's health rights activist

- Born: 1951 (age 74–75); Khartoum North
- Citizenship: Sudan
- Education: University of Khartoum
- Occupation: Surgeon

Nahid Toubia (Arabic:ناهد طوبيا) (born 1951) is a Sudanese surgeon and women's health rights activist, specializing in research into female genital mutilation.

Toubia is the co-founder and director of RAINBO, the Research, Action and Information Network for Bodily Integrity of Women. She is an associate professor at Columbia University School of Public Health. She sits on scientific and advisory committees for the World Health Organization, UNICEF, and UNDP. She is also vice-chair of the advisory committee of the Women's Rights Watch Project of Human Rights Watch.

Focusing on reproductive health and gender inequality in Africa and the Middle East, Toubia is the author or co-author of several books, including Women of the Arab World: The Coming Challenge (1988), Female Genital Mutilation: A Call for Global Action (1995), and Female Genital Mutilation: A Guide to Worldwide Laws and Policies (2000).

== Education ==
Toubia was born in Khartoum North, Sudan, and attended primary and intermediate schooling at a local church school. However, due to the lack of intensity of private education in Sudan, she took a state exam to permit her admission to Khartoum Secondary School for Girls. She then attended the University of Kharthoum for pre-medical studies for one year. She then pursued a career as a physician, attending medical school in Egypt. In 1981 she completed her surgical training in the United Kingdom, gaining an MPhil and a PhD in Public Health & Policy from the London School of Hygiene and Tropical Medicine. She became a fellow of the Royal College of Surgeons in 1981, and the first female surgeon in Sudan.

== Career and research ==
In 1985 she returned to Sudan, where she was head of paediatric surgery at Khartoum Teaching Hospital, and set up her own emergency clinic to help patients who were receiving inadequate care at state hospitals. As a result of the country's political instability she returned to the UK, and began her research into female genital mutilation (FGM). From 1990 she worked for four years at the Population Council in New York City.

Toubia stepped back from practicing medicine, despite being a surgeon in Sudan, after leaving the country. FGM became the primary focus of her research, working on multiple research projects that address the practice and propose solutions for stopping the practice. She has also worked on papers for medical practitioners to use when treating victims of FGM. In addition, she advocates for and researches other aspects of women's health, including post-abortion care.

== Activism ==
Toubia is the founder and president of Research, Action and Information Network for the Bodily Integrity of Women (Rainbo), an international organization which works to eliminate FGM through women’s self-empowerment and social change. The organization has offices in New York City and London, and works in Uganda, South Africa, the Gambia, and Nigeria. Rainbo played a prominent role in changing the view of FGM from being a predominantly medical concern to a human rights issue.

In 2002 Toubia told the BBC World Service that the campaign against FGM was fundamentally about changing women's consciousness, and empowering them to change their social position. She said while most African governments, health professionals and NGOs had the issue on their agenda, the greatest challenge was at grassroots level. She said "By allowing your genitals to be removed [it is perceived that] you are heightened to another level of pure motherhood - a motherhood not tainted by sexuality and that is why the woman gives it away to become the matron, respected by everyone. By taking on this practice, which is a woman's domain, it actually empowers them. It is much more difficult to convince the women to give it up, than to convince the men."

Toubia is currently the Director of the Institute of Reproductive Health and Rights in Sudan, a Non-Governmental Organization (NGO) which advocates for females to receive safe and consensual medical care.

== Selected works ==
- Women of the Arab World: The Coming Challenge (1988)
- Female Circumcision as a Public Health Issue (1994)
- Female Genital Mutilation: A Call for Global Action (1995)
- with Susan Izett, Learning About Social Change : A Research and Evaluation Guidebook Using Female Circumcision as a Case Study (1999)
- Caring for Women with Circumcision: A Technical Manual for Health Care Providers (1999)
- with Anika Rahman, Female Genital Mutilation: A Guide to Worldwide Laws and Policies (2000)
- Learning About Social Change: A Research and Evaluation Guidebook Using Female Circumcision as a Case Study (1999, with Susan Izett)
- The Synergistic Relationship Between Health and Human Rights: A Case Study Using Female Genital Mutilation (1997, co-authored)
