= Rainbow Falls =

Rainbow Falls is the name of several waterfalls:

New Zealand:

- Rainbow Falls (Waianiwaniwa), at Kerikeri
- Āniwaniwa Falls (Rainbow Falls) near Lake Waikaremoana

Canada:

- Rainbow Falls, British Columbia

United States:

- Rainbow Falls, Adirondack State Park, New York
- Rainbow Falls (California), Devils Postpile National Monument, California
- Rainbow Falls (Chattooga River), Cashiers, North Carolina
- Rainbow Falls (Chelan County), Stehekin, Washington
- Rainbow Falls (Hawaii), Hilo, Hawaii
- Rainbow Falls (Horsepasture River), Transylvania County, North Carolina
- Rainbow Falls (Manitou Springs, Colorado)
- Rainbow Falls (Michigan), Black River, Michigan
- Rainbow Falls (Missouri River), Great Falls, Montana
- Rainbow Falls (Montana), Glacier National Park
- Rainbow Falls (Rutherford County), Rutherford County, North Carolina
- Rainbow Falls State Park, Lewis County, Washington

Computing Systems:

- SPARC T3, a microprocessor also known as "Rainbow Falls"

Other:

- Rainbow Falls Trail
- Rainbow Falls (My Little Pony: Friendship Is Magic), an episode of the fourth season of My Little Pony: Friendship Is Magic
