= Rainbow Coalition =

Wikimedia disambiguation page

A Rainbow Coalition may refer to different or related political concepts or movements in various parts of the world. In countries with parliamentary systems, it can refer to any coalition government composed of a coalition of several ideologically unrelated political parties which are united by opposition to one or more dominant parties. In the United States, the "rainbow" concept has mainly referred to a diversity of ethnicities and other demographic categories within a political organization or movement.

== North America ==
=== United States ===
In the United States, the first rainbow coalition sought to bring together disadvantaged people from a broad spectrum of races and creeds, and voter mobilization was a primary goal in that effort.

- 1969: Fred Hampton's Rainbow Coalition was a multiracial, working class alliance formed in Chicago. It was composed of various US political organizations including primarily African Americans and former Latino Gangs- José Jiménez and the Young Lords.
- 1984: Jesse Jackson's Rainbow/PUSH Coalition called for Arab Americans, Native Americans, Asian Americans, youth, disabled veterans, small farmers, lesbians and gays to join with African Americans and American Jews for political purposes around his presidential candidacy.
- 1996: The Green-Rainbow Party is an affiliate of the Green Party of the United States in Massachusetts.

=== Canada ===
- The informal name of a group of independent MPs in May/June 1990 before they started calling themselves Bloc Québécois.

== Africa ==
- National Rainbow Coalition, a former Kenyan political alliance

== Asia ==
- Rainbow Coalition, a former Philippine political alliance in the House of Representatives

== Europe ==
- The 24th government of Ireland, formed by Fine Gael, Labour and Democratic Left parties
- Lipponen I cabinet and Lipponen II cabinet (1995–2003) in Finland, with parties from all parts of the left-right spectrum, were the original "rainbow coalitions" (sateenkaarihallitus). Katainen cabinet and its successor Stubb cabinet were also characterized as rainbow coalitions.
- The 15 October Coalition in Poland, formed by the Civic Coalition, Poland 2050, Polish Coalition and The Left. Its positions ranged "from radical left to moderate conservatives [on cultural issues]" and "from welfare-state socialists to pro-market neo-liberals".
- A group of political parties in Belgium, formed in 1999 under the premiership of Guy Verhofstadt (see Belgium#Politics and government).
- Rainbow (Netherlands), an alliance of Dutch left-wing political parties from 1989 to 1990.
- The Left – The Rainbow, an alliance of Italian left-wing political parties from 2007 to 2008.

== Middle East ==
- Israel's Thirty-sixth government was formed by a diverse coalition of parties from both the left and the right, who's uniting goal was the removal of Benjamin Netanyahu from office.

== See also ==
- Rainbow (disambiguation)
- Rainbow (Greece), a political party in Greece
- Coalition
- Rainbow nation
