= Rainbow Boulevard =

Rainbow Boulevard may refer to:

- Rainbow Boulevard (Kansas City)
- Rainbow Boulevard (Las Vegas)
- Rainbow Boulevard in Niagara Falls, New York, formerly part of New York State Route 384
- A portion of U.S. Route 169 in Kansas

== See also ==
- Rainbow Street
- Rainbow Route
- Rainbow Road (disambiguation)
- Rainbow Row
- Rainbow Circle
