= Rainbow Range =

Rainbow Range may refer to:

- Rainbow Range (Chilcotin Plateau), a mountain range in British Columbia, Canada
- Rainbow Range (Rocky Mountains), a small subrange of the Rocky Mountains in British Columbia, Canada

== See also ==
- Rainbow Mountain (disambiguation)
