= Rainbow storage =

Rainbow storage is a developing paper-based data storage technique first demonstrated by Indian student Sainul Abideen in November 2006. Abideen received his MCA from MES Engineering College Kuttipuram in Kerala's Malappuram District .

Initial newspaper reports of the technology were disputed by multiple technical sources, although Abideen says those reports were based on a misunderstanding of the technology. The paper meant to demonstrate the capability of storing relatively large amounts of data (and not necessarily in the gigabyte range) using textures and diagrams.

The Rainbow data storage technology claims to use geometric shapes such as triangles, circles and squares of various colors to store a large amount of data on ordinary paper or plastic surfaces. This would provide several advantages over current forms of optical- or magnetic data storage like less environmental pollution due to the biodegradability of paper, low cost and high capacity. Data could be stored on "Rainbow Versatile Disk" (RVD) or plastic/paper cards of any form factor (like SIM cards).

== Criticism ==
Following the wide media attention this news received, some of the claims have been disputed by various experts.

Printing at 1,200 dots per inch (DPI) leads to a theoretical maximum of 1,440,000 colored dots per square inch. If a scanner can reliably distinguish between 256 unique colors (thus encoding one byte per dot), the maximum possible storage is approximately 140 megabytes for a sheet of A4 paper–much lower when the necessary error correction is employed. If the scanner were able to accurately distinguish between 16,777,216 colors (24 bits, or 3 bytes per dot), the capacity would triple, but it still falls well below the media stories' claims of several hundred gigabytes.

Printing this quantity of unique colors would require specialized equipment to generate many spot colors. The process color model used by most printers provides only four colors, with additional colors simulated by a halftone pattern.

At least one of three things must be true for the claim to be valid:

- The paper must be printed and scanned at a much higher resolution than 1,200 DPI,
- the printer and scanner must be able to accurately produce and distinguish between an extraordinary number of distinct color values, or
- the compression scheme must be a revolutionary lossless compression algorithm.

The theory is: If Rainbow's "geometric" algorithm is to be encoded and decoded by a computer, it would equally viable to store the compressed data on a conventional disk rather than printing it to paper or other non-digital medium. Printing something as dots on a page rather than bits on a disk will not change the underlying compression ratio, so a lossless compression algorithm that could store 250 gigabytes within a few hundred megabytes of data would be revolutionary indeed. Likewise, data can be compressed with any algorithm and subsequently printed to paper as colored dots. The amount of data that can be reliably stored in this way is limited by the printer and scanner, as described above.

However Sainul Abideen says that the articles are based on misunderstandings. He claims, it as a method to store data in the form of colour, in any medium where colour can be represented, not only paper. Density of storage in paper will be very small and the density will be depends on the storage medium, capacity of colour representation and retrieval methods etc.

== Demonstrations ==
Sainul Abdeen demonstrated his technology to the college and members of the Indian press in the MES College of Engineering computer lab, Kerala, and was able to compress 450 sheets plain text from foolscap paper into a 1-inch square. He also demonstrated a 45-second audio clip compressed using this technology on to an A4 sheet. Depending on the sampling frequency, bit depth, and audio compression (if any), a 45-second audio clip can consist of anywhere from a few kilobytes to a few megabytes of data. Abideen claimed that the technology could be extended to 250 gigabytes by using specific materials and devices.

This technology is based on two principles:

Principle I
“Every color or color combinations can be converted into some values and from the values the colors or color combinations can be regenerated”.
Principle II
“Every different color or color combinations will produce different values”.

== Absolute Rainbow Dots ==
Absolute rainbow dots are used to detect errors caused by scratches, and whether any fading has occurred. Absolute rainbow dots are predefined dots carrying a unique value. These dots can be inserted in the rainbow picture in pre-specified areas. If fading occurs these dot values will change accordingly, and at the reproduction stage this can be checked and corrected. Absolute rainbow dots will be microscopically small so that they occupy very little space in the rainbow picture. These will be colored differently so that each dot will have its own fixed unique value.
