= Rainbow Falls (British Columbia) =

Slollicum Creek Falls
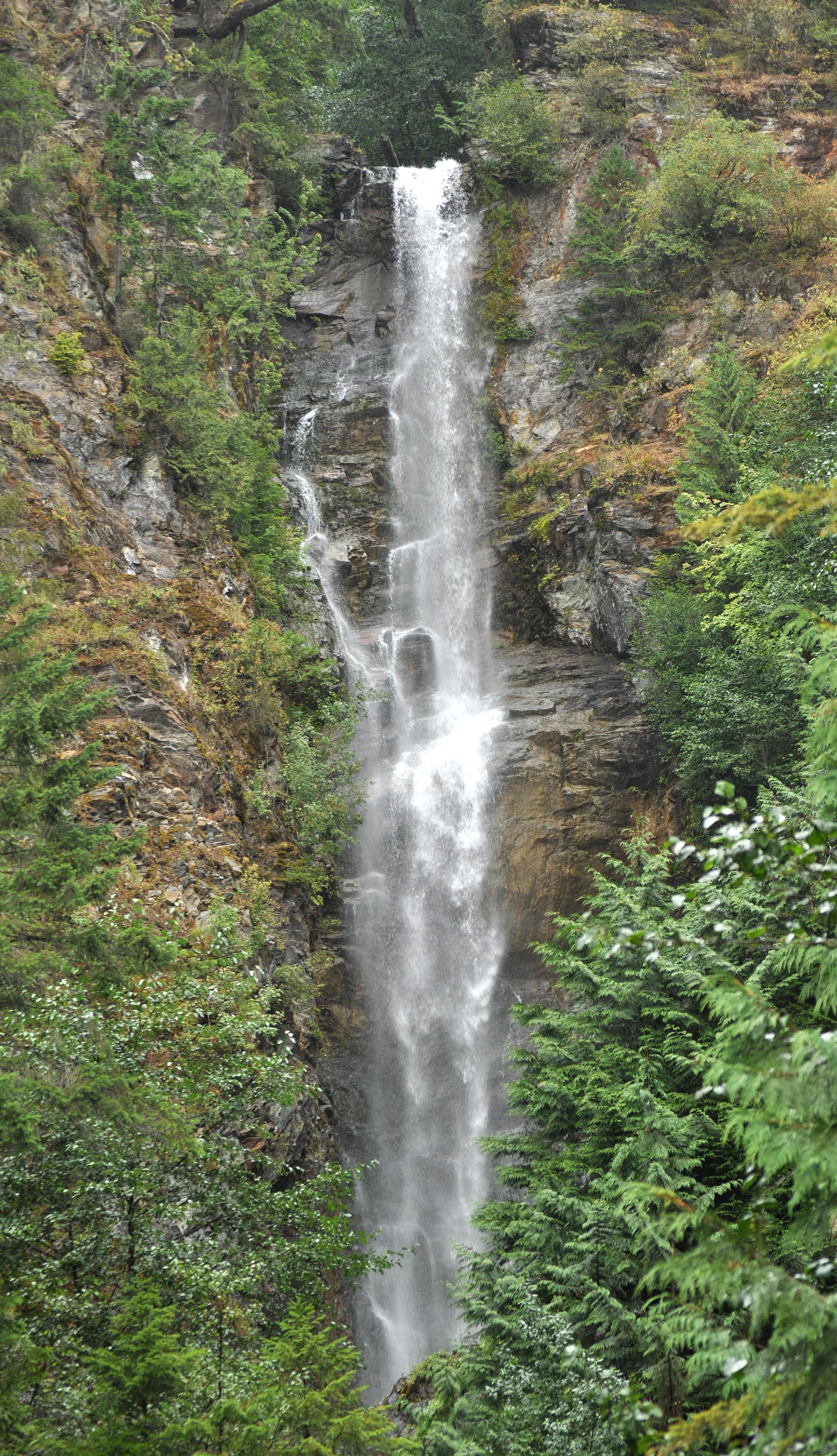
- Interactive map of Slollicum Creek Falls
- Location: Harrison Hot Springs, British Columbia, Canada
- Coordinates: 49°23′57″N 121°44′38″W
- Type: Plunge
- Total height: 140 metres (460 ft)
- Longest drop: 40 metres (130 ft)
- Watercourse: Slollicum Creek

Slollicum Creek Falls is a perennial plunge waterfall located near Harrison Lake, British Columbia, Canada. The falls, often mistakenly assumed to be Rainbow Falls, can be viewed without difficulty from a bridge on the unpaved East Harrison FSR below. An additional, equally tall plunge exists above the visible falls; however cannot be seen from below due to the angle afforded. Rainbow Falls itself is a separate waterfall on the same water course where Slollicum Creek discharges into Harrison Lake at its namesake recreation site. Access to this location seems to be boat only.

== See also ==
- List of waterfalls
- List of waterfalls in British Columbia
