= Research Action and Information Network for the Bodily Integrity of Women =

Non-governmental organisation

Research Action and Information Network for the Bodily Integrity of Women (RAINBO, also stylized as RAINB♀) is an international non-governmental organisation working to eliminate female circumcision and female genital mutilation.

== Foundation and initial impact ==
RAINBO was founded in 1994 by a group of African immigrants to the United States including Nahid Toubia, Sudan's first female surgeon. The organisation has offices in New York City and London and works in Uganda, South Africa, The Gambia, and Nigeria.

The RAINBO played a prominent role in changing the view of female circumcision/female genital mutilation from being a predominantly medical concern to a human rights issue. In 1995 RAINBO published Nahid Toubia's "Female Genital Mutilation: A Call for Global Action", discussing the cultural significance of FC/FGM in Africa and suggesting legal, religious, social and political measures to combat the practice and the report "Intersections Between Health and Human Rights: The Case of Female Genital Mutilation", based on the National Council on International Health (NCIH) international workshop attended by legal professionals, academics, social scientists, and activists.

== Significant publications ==
In 1998 Nahid Toubia and Susan Izett of RAINBO were responsible for producing the World Health Organisation's "Female Genital Mutilation: an overview", a comprehensive review of the prevalence, epidemiology and health consequences of FC/FGM, suggesting an agenda for research and "technically sound policies and approaches" for use by government agencies and NGOs working to eliminate the practice.

In 1999 the African Immigrant Program at RAINBO published three pamphlets for the African immigrant and refugee communities and the social workers and health care providers working with those communities:

- "Caring for Women with Circumcision: A Technical Manual for Health Care Providers" (Nahid Toubia), on managing the physical complications of FC/FGM, understanding the social and cultural significance of the practice and providing culturally sensitive counselling (foreword by Donna Shalala, Secretary, U.S. Department of Health and Human Services)
- "Learning About Social Change: A Research and Evaluation Guidebook Using FC/FGM as a Case Study (Susan Izett and Nahid Toubia), using FC/FGM as a case study of research and evaluation aimed at understanding and effecting social change.
- "FC/FGM Full Color Quick Reference Chart", a chart illustrating the commonest types of FC/FGM and defibulation.

== Approach ==
RAINBO emphasises African leadership in its work and the use of culturally sensitive terminology. Nahid Toubia has criticised the West's "sensationalisation" of a practice she strongly opposes on the grounds that it reinforces a view of Arabs, Muslims and Africans as "primitive" and provokes a reaction of over-sensitivity in the communities concerned.

== AMANITARE initiative ==
AMANITARE (African Partnership for Sexual and Reproductive Health and Rights of Women and Girls) is a ten-year initiative (1999–2009) coordinated by RAINBO. It is a pan-African partnership seeking "to institutionalise recognition of African women’s and girls’ sexual and reproductive health and rights as fundamental to their civil and human rights", and in particular to combat gender-based violence, launched in Kampala (Uganda) in 2000. The aim of the initiative is to put the principles enshrined in the final declarations of three world conferences, The World Conference on Human Rights (Vienna, 1993), the International Conference on Population and Development (Cairo, 1994), and the Fifth World Conference on Women (Beijing, 1995), highlighting the importance of women's sexual and reproductive health and rights, into practice in the daily lives of African women and girls by removing the fear of control or coercion based on their sexuality or reproductive potential.

AMANITARE established 4 February as the continent-wide African Women's Health and Rights Day, when NGOs, women's groups, youth organisations, activists, artists and government representatives join to celebrate advances in African Women's sexual and reproductive health and rights (SRHR).
