= Rainbow Mountain (Clark County, Nevada) =

Mountain summit in Nevada, United States

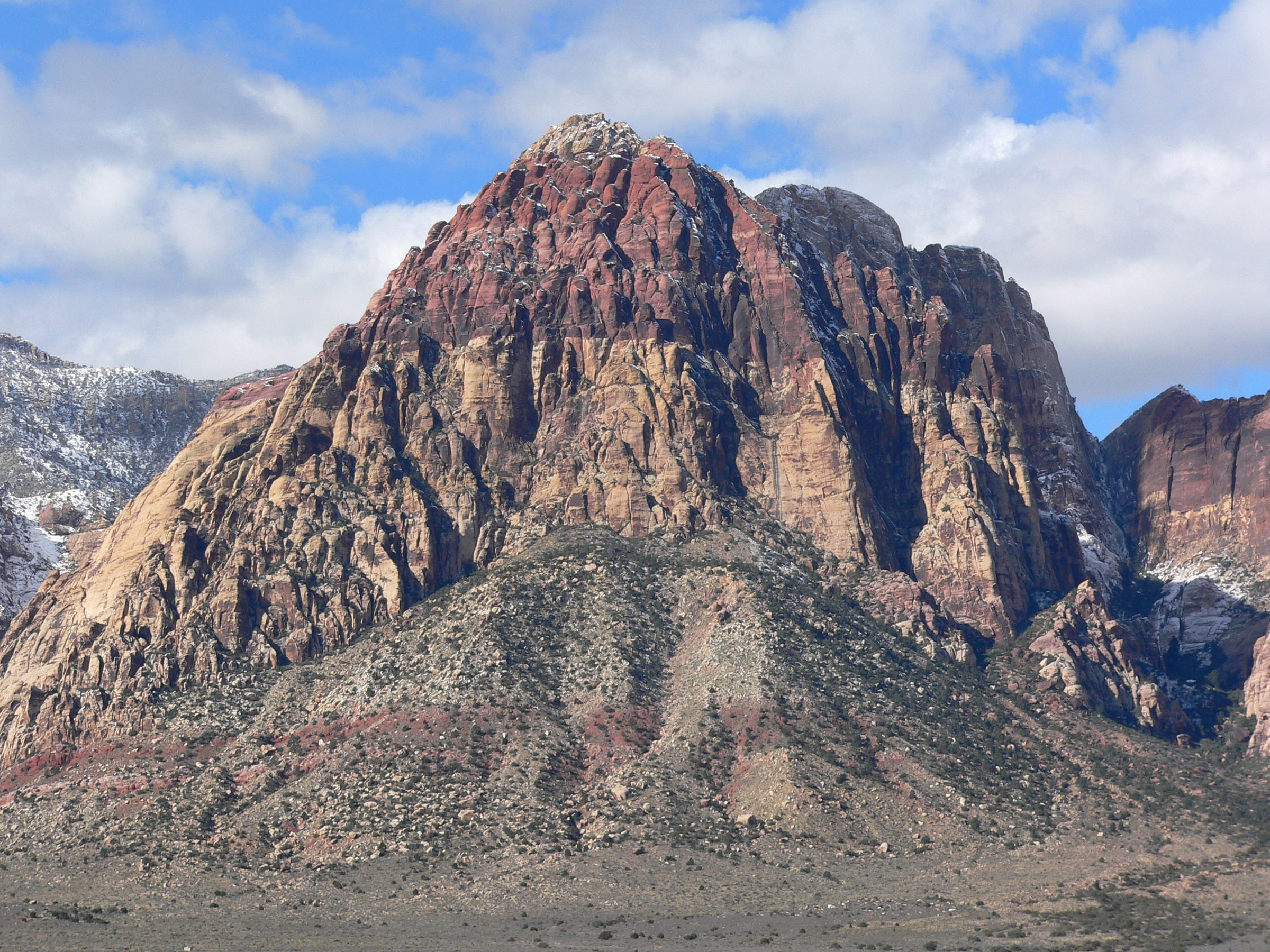
- East aspect

Highest point
- Elevation: 6,811 ft (2,076 m)
- Prominence: 240 ft (73 m)
- Isolation: 0.39 mi (0.63 km)
- Coordinates: 36°06′29″N 115°29′25″W

Geography
- Location within Nevada Location within the United States
- Country: United States
- State: Nevada
- County: Clark
- Protected area: Red Rock Canyon National Conservation Area; Rainbow Mountain Wilderness
- Parent range: Spring Mountains; Great Basin Ranges
- Topo map: USGS Blue Diamond

Geology
- Rock age: Early Jurassic
- Rock type: Aztec Sandstone

Climbing
- Easiest route: class 3 scrambling

Rainbow Mountain is a 6,811-foot-elevation (2,076-meter) mountain summit in Clark County, Nevada, United States.

== Description ==
Rainbow Mountain is located 17 miles (27 km) west of downtown Las Vegas in the Spring Mountains which are a subrange of the Great Basin Ranges. It is set on land administered by the Bureau of Land Management as the Red Rock Canyon National Conservation Area, part of the Rainbow Mountain Wilderness Area. The peak is 0.62 miles (1.00 km) immediately north of Mount Wilson. Precipitation runoff from the mountain's slopes drains north into Red Rock Wash and south into Oak Creek. Topographic relief is significant as the summit rises 2,500 feet (762 meters) above Oak Creek Canyon in less than one-half mile (0.8 km). This mountain's descriptive toponym has been officially adopted by the U.S. Board on Geographic Names.

== Climate ==
Rainbow Mountain is set within the Mojave Desert which has hot summers and cold winters. The desert is an example of a cold desert climate as the desert's elevation makes temperatures cooler than lower elevation deserts. Due to the high elevation and aridity, temperatures drop sharply after sunset. Summer nights are comfortably cool. Winter highs are generally above freezing, and winter nights are bitterly cold, with temperatures often dropping well below freezing.

== Geology ==
Rainbow Mountain is composed of Aztec Sandstone which formed about 180–190 million years ago as lithified sand dunes in a desert during the Early Jurassic. The red, orange, and brown coloring of the sandstone is caused by the presence of iron oxide or hematite. Red spots in the buff sandstone are iron oxide concretions called "Moqui marbles."

== Climbing routes ==
Established rock climbing routes

- Beelzebub – class 5.11b – First Ascent 2012
- Rockingstone Groove – class 5.9+
- The Growler – class 5.9+ – FA 2013
- Tickled Pink – class 5.11a
- Pure Snark – class 5.10b – FA 2021
- Wise Guys Off Size – class 5.10c – FA 1973
- Solar Slab – class 5.6 – FA 1975

== See also ==
- Great Basin

== Gallery ==
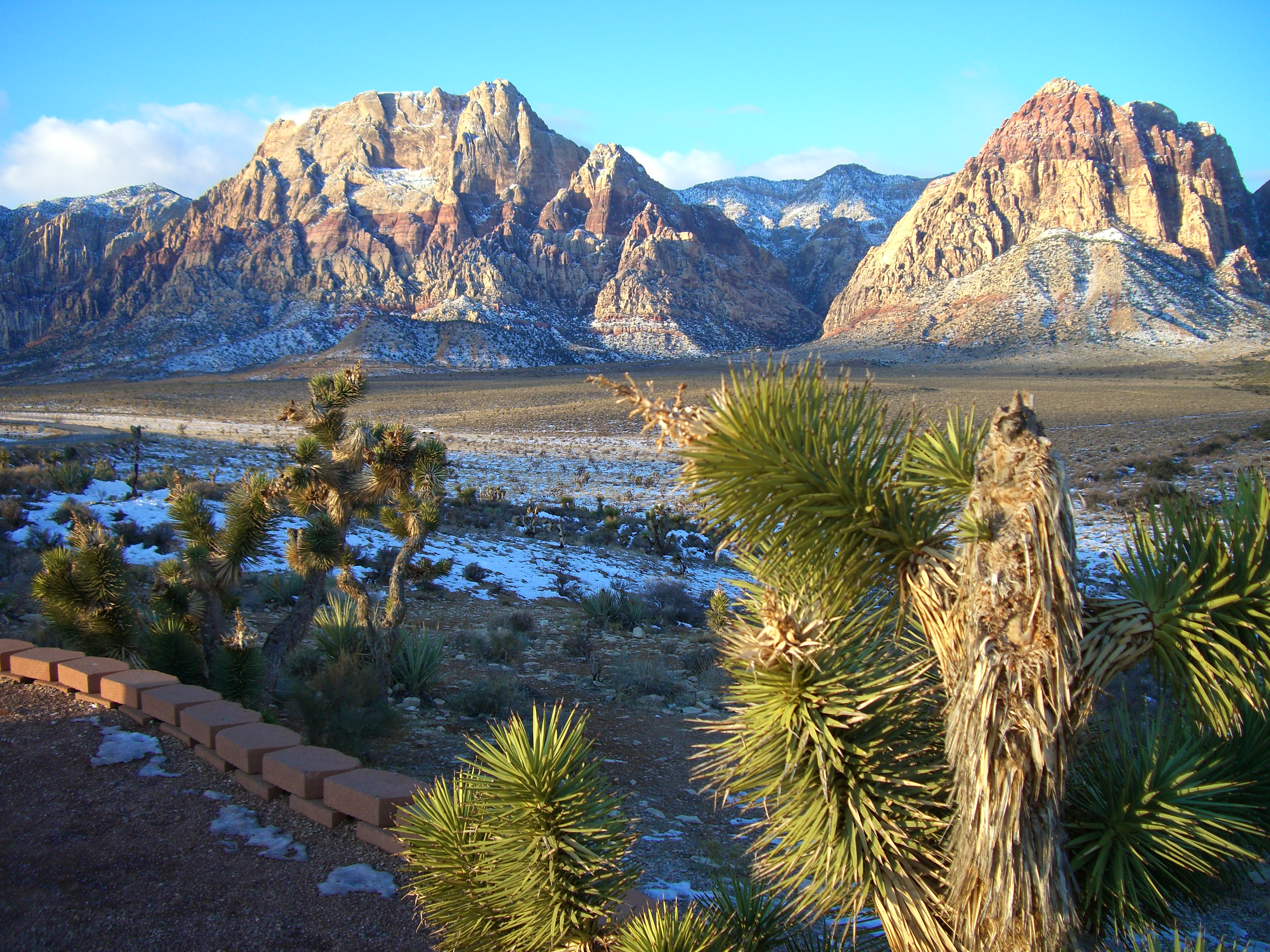
Mount Wilson (left) and Rainbow Mountain (right)

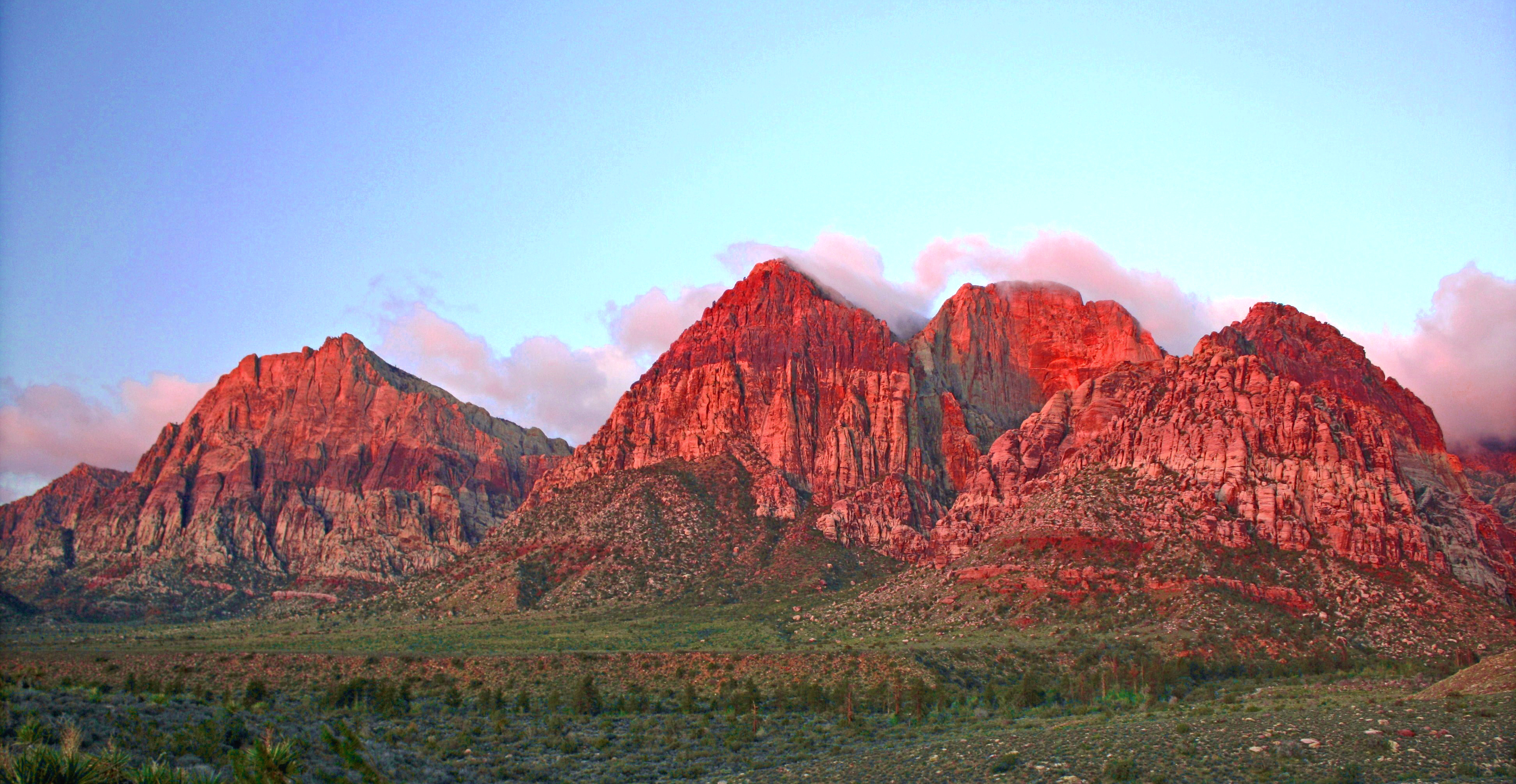
Rainbow Mountain (centered) at sunrise

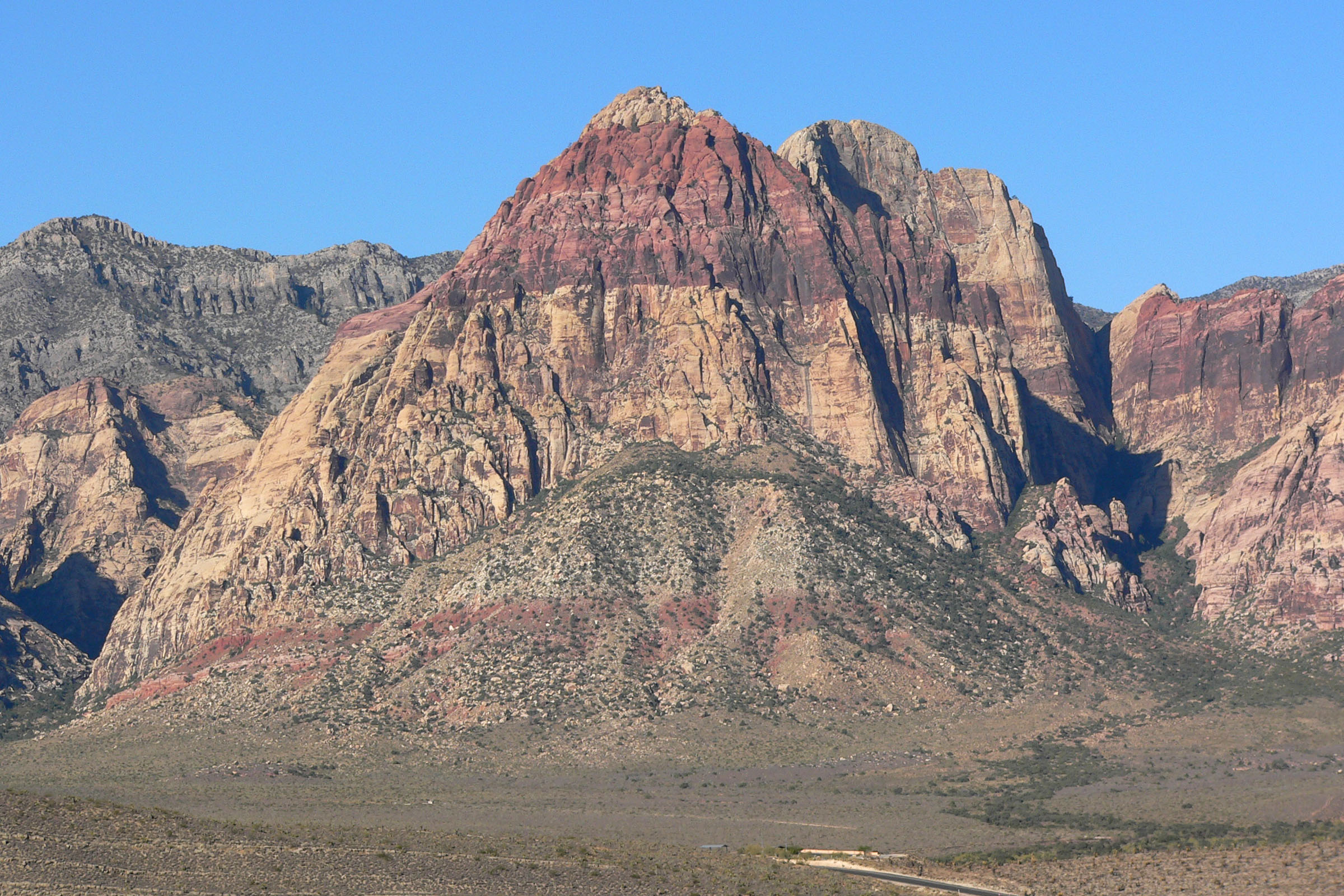

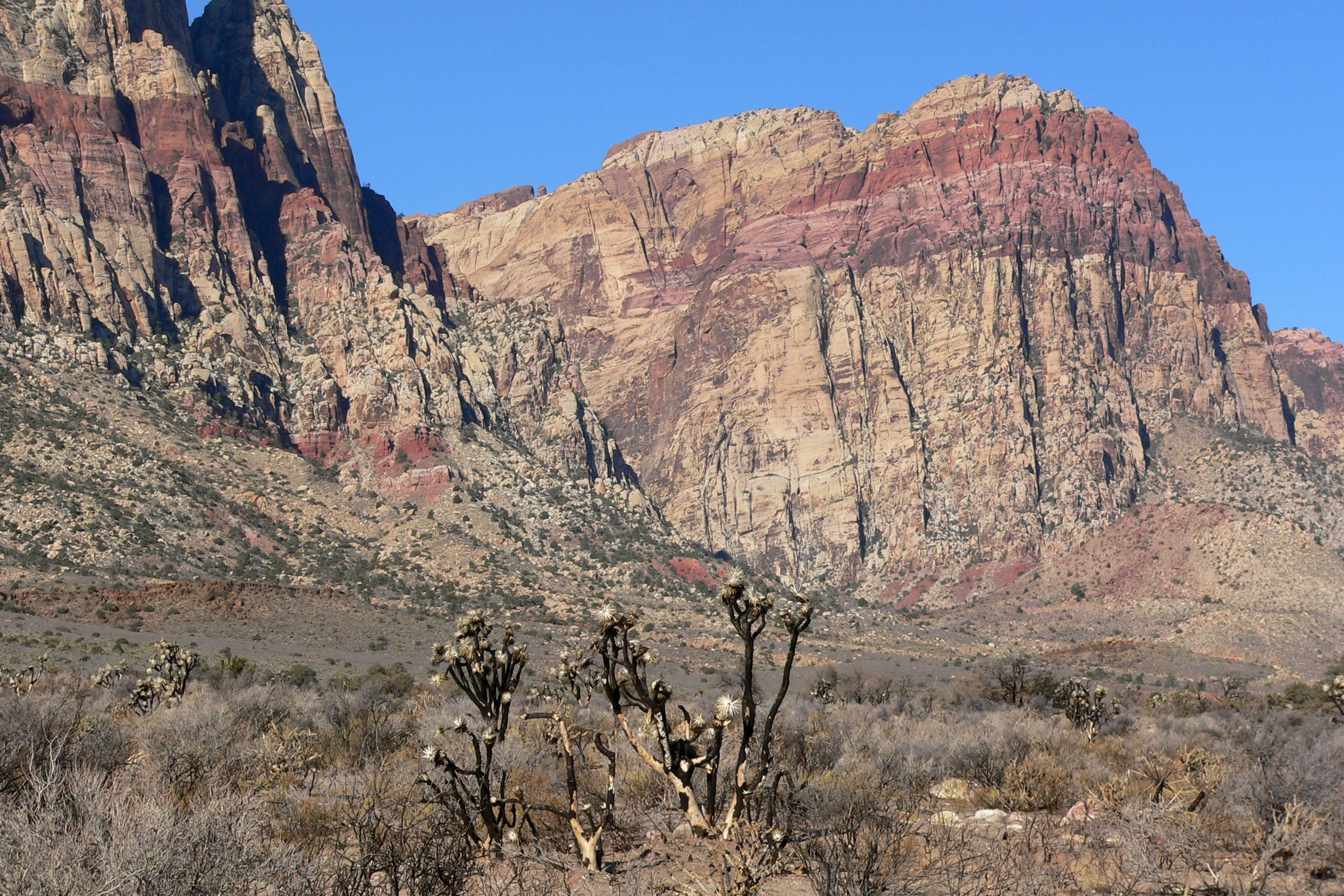
Southeast aspect

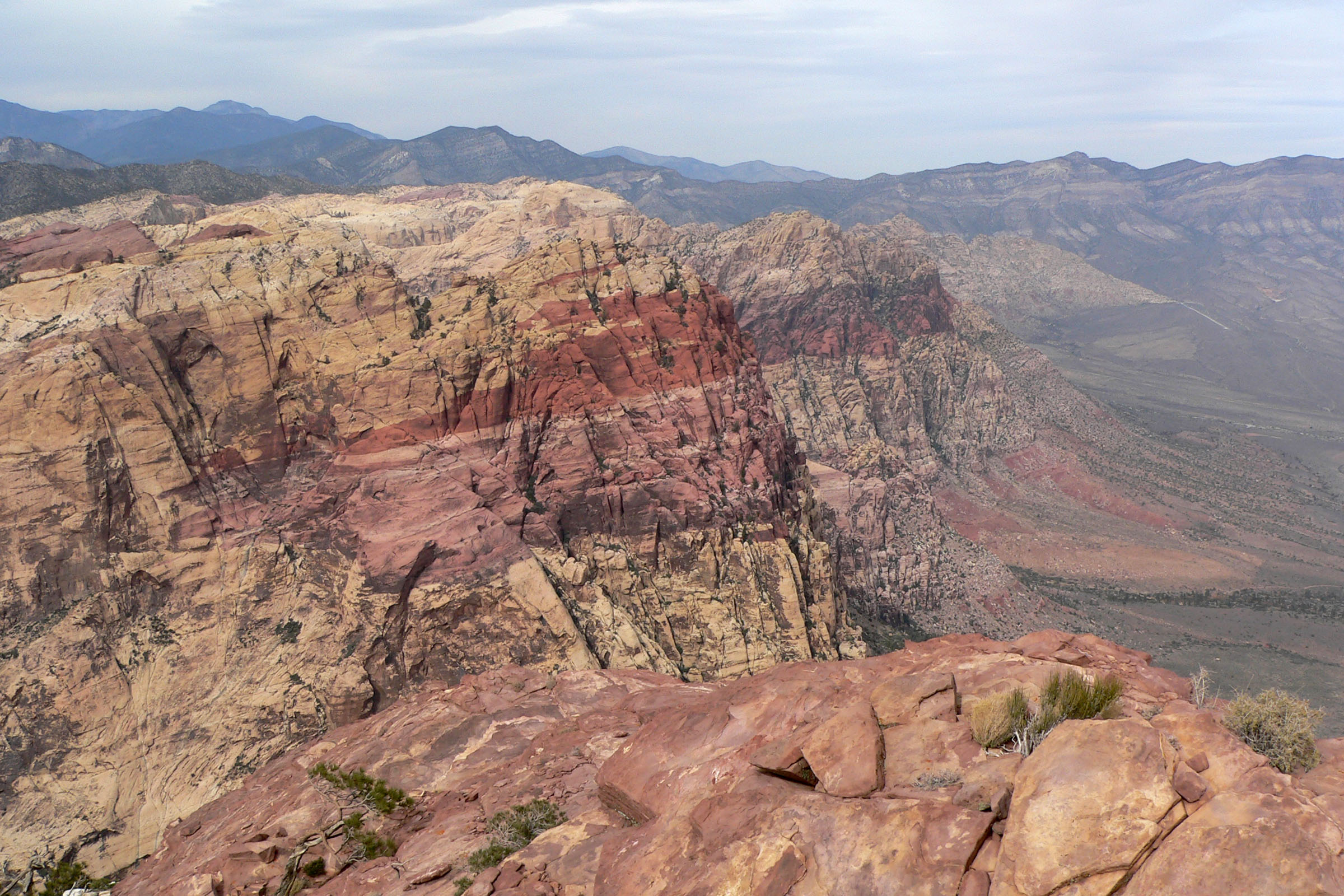
Rainbow Mountain viewed from Mount Wilson
