= Rainbow Mountain (Alabama) =

Mountain in the United States

- Location within Alabama

Highest point
- Elevation: 1,142 ft (348 m)
- Coordinates: 34°44′5.05″N 86°43′44.82″W

Geography
- Location: Madison county, Alabama, US
- Topo map: USGS Grant

Rainbow Mountain is a mountain in Madison county, Alabama. The mountain's name is derived from the name of Elisha Rainbolt, who settled on the mountain around 1810.

== Geology ==
Like the overwhelming majority of geological features in the Highland region, Rainbow Mountain is characterized by sedimentary rocks (mostly limestone) from middle to late Paleozoic filled with fossils of corals and bryozoans. This is unsurprising, as almost all of contemporary Alabama's landmass was submerged under the Tethys Seaway and served as the ground for splendid coral reef ecosystems. All the strata of Rainbow Mountain are from Mississippian. The stratigraphy of Rainbow Mountain is such, from older to younger (also lower to higher in altitude):

1. Below the main elevated mass of the mountain is Fort Payne Chert.

2. Tuscumbia Limestone.

3. Monteagle Limestone.

4. On the very top sits Hartselle Sandstone.

Fossils found there are Archimedes, rugose corals, and crinoids. Local minerals, excluding ones composing aforementioned rocks, are dolomite, calcite, fluorite, and sphalerite. Some rocks have ripple marks on them. The landscape is karstic, riddled with sinkholes and small grottos.

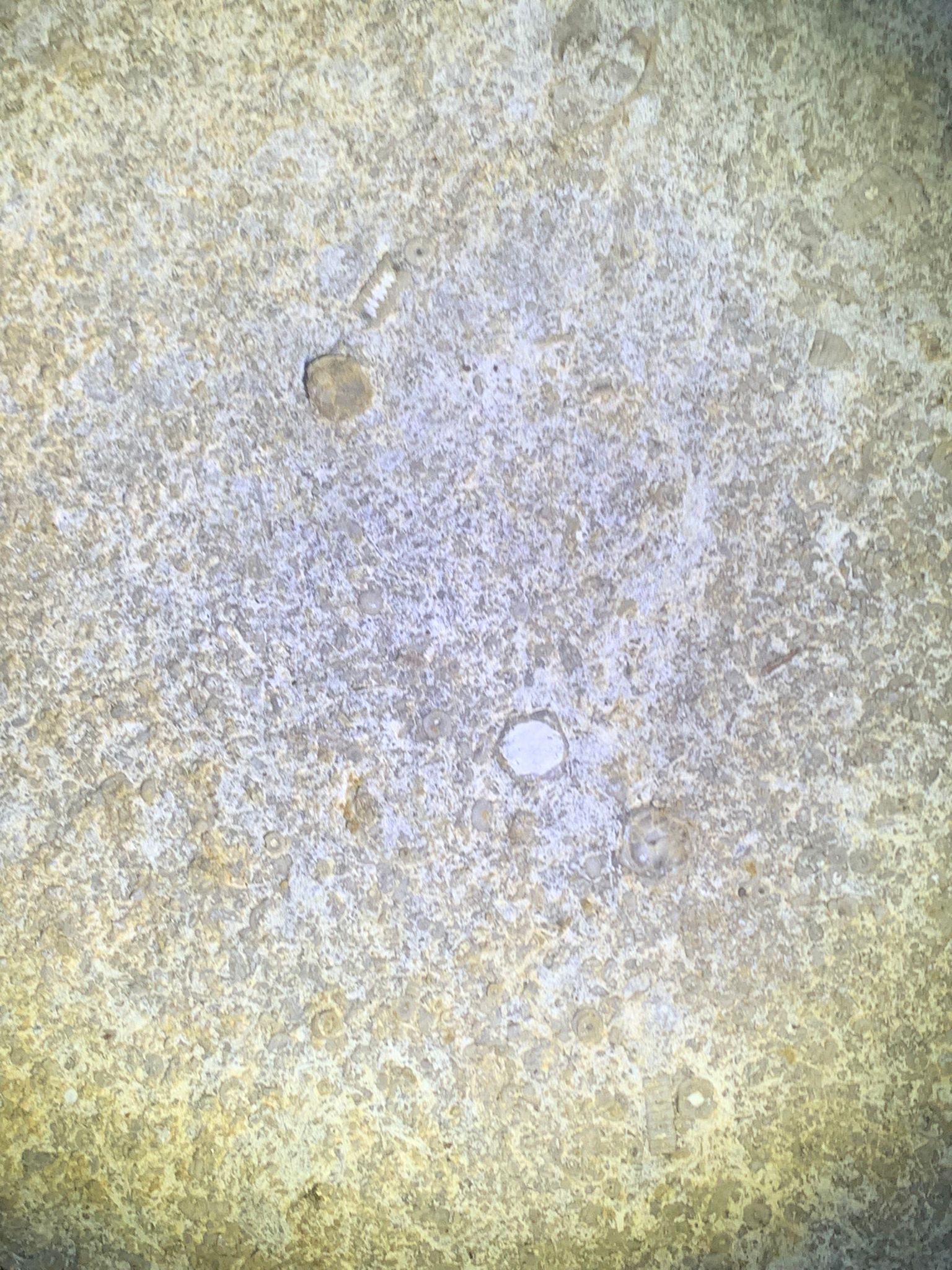
Archimedes

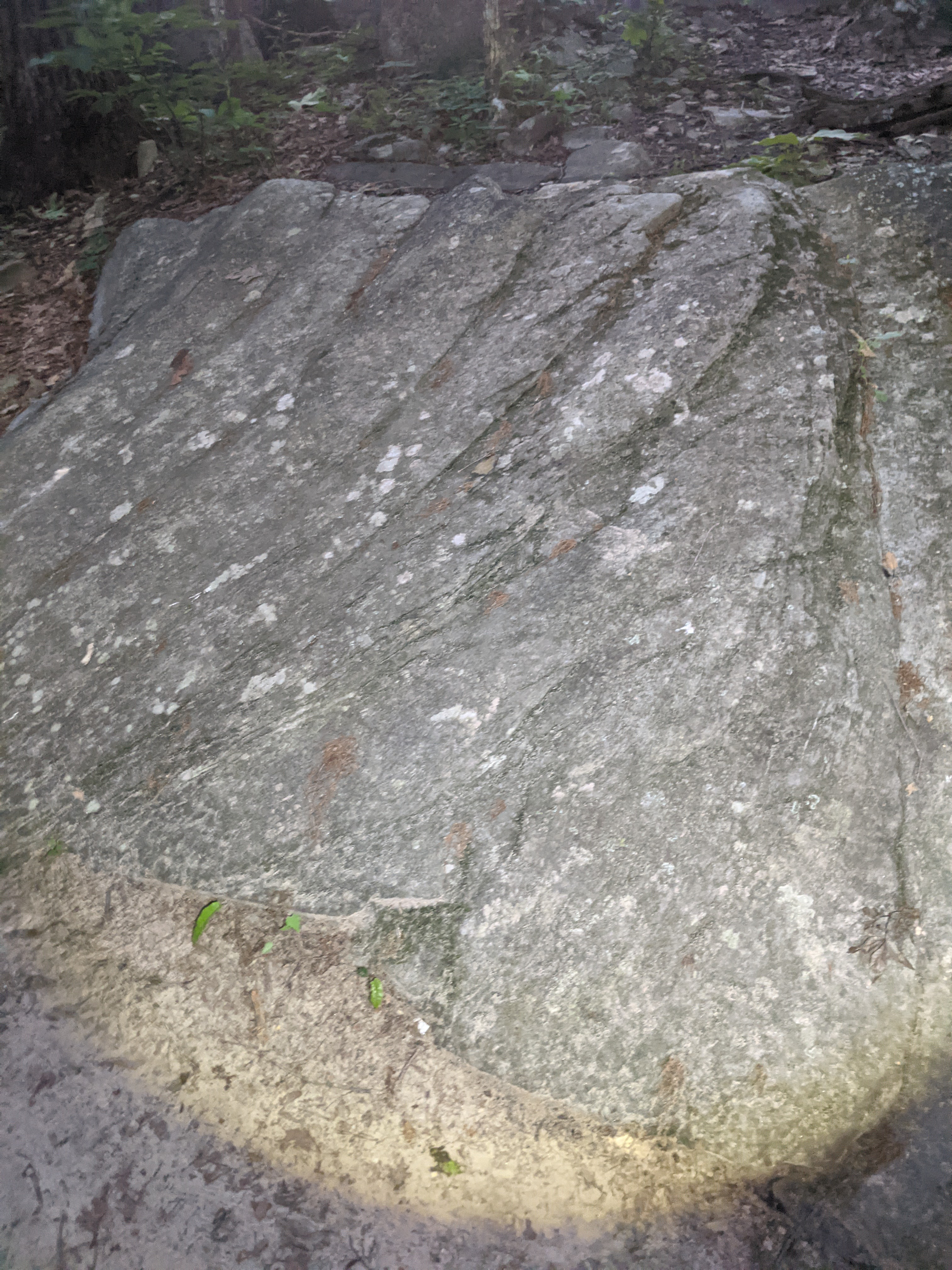
Ripplemarks

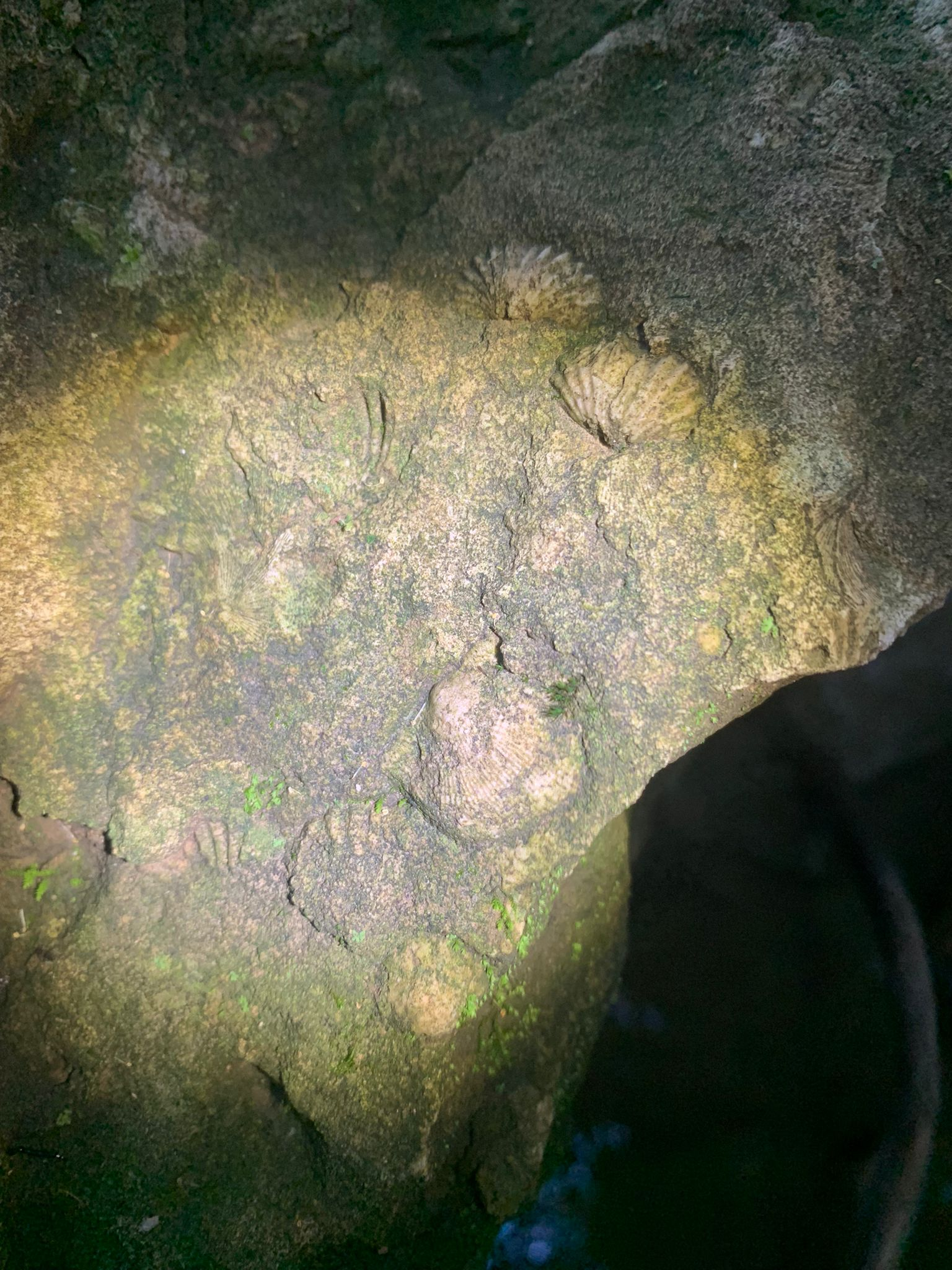
Fossil shells

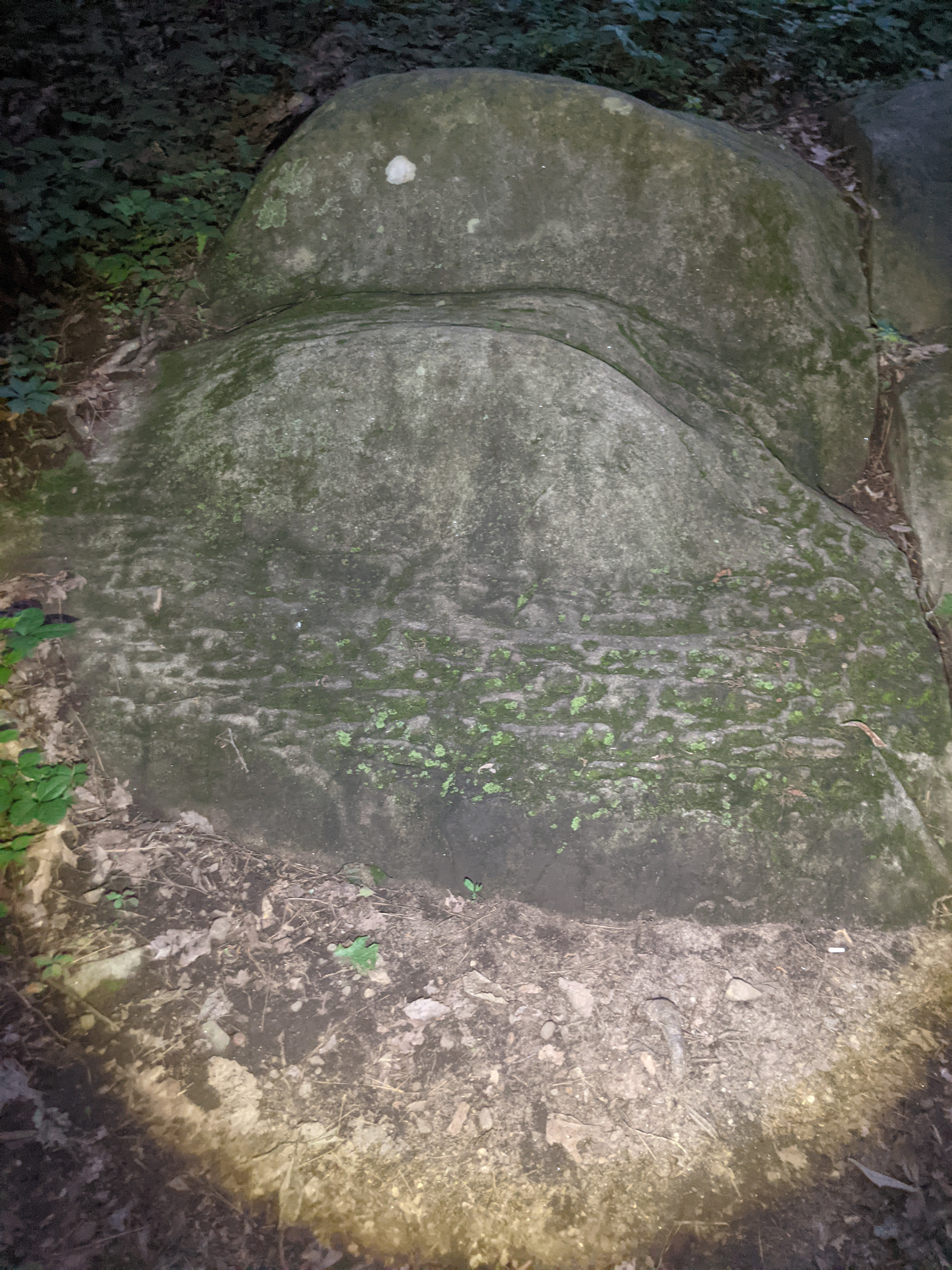
Lithified ripples

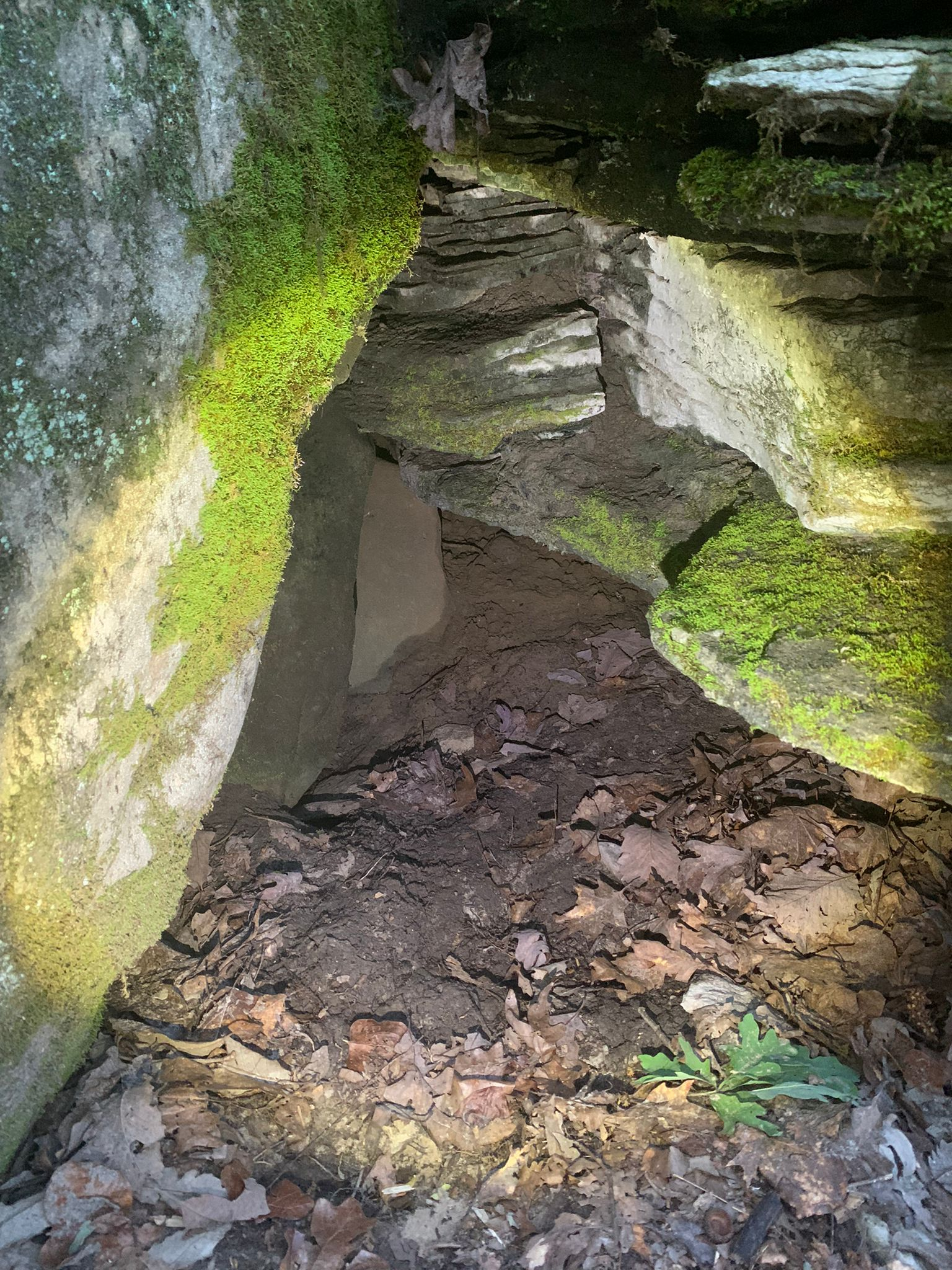
A grotto

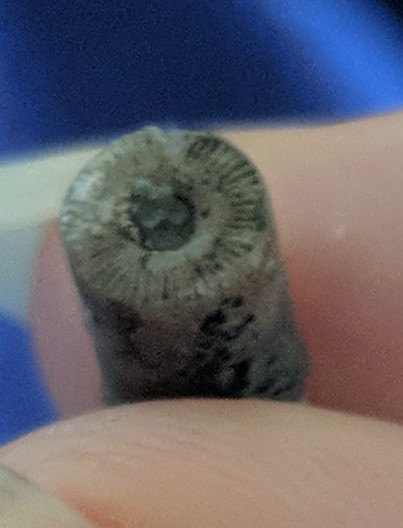
Coral close-up

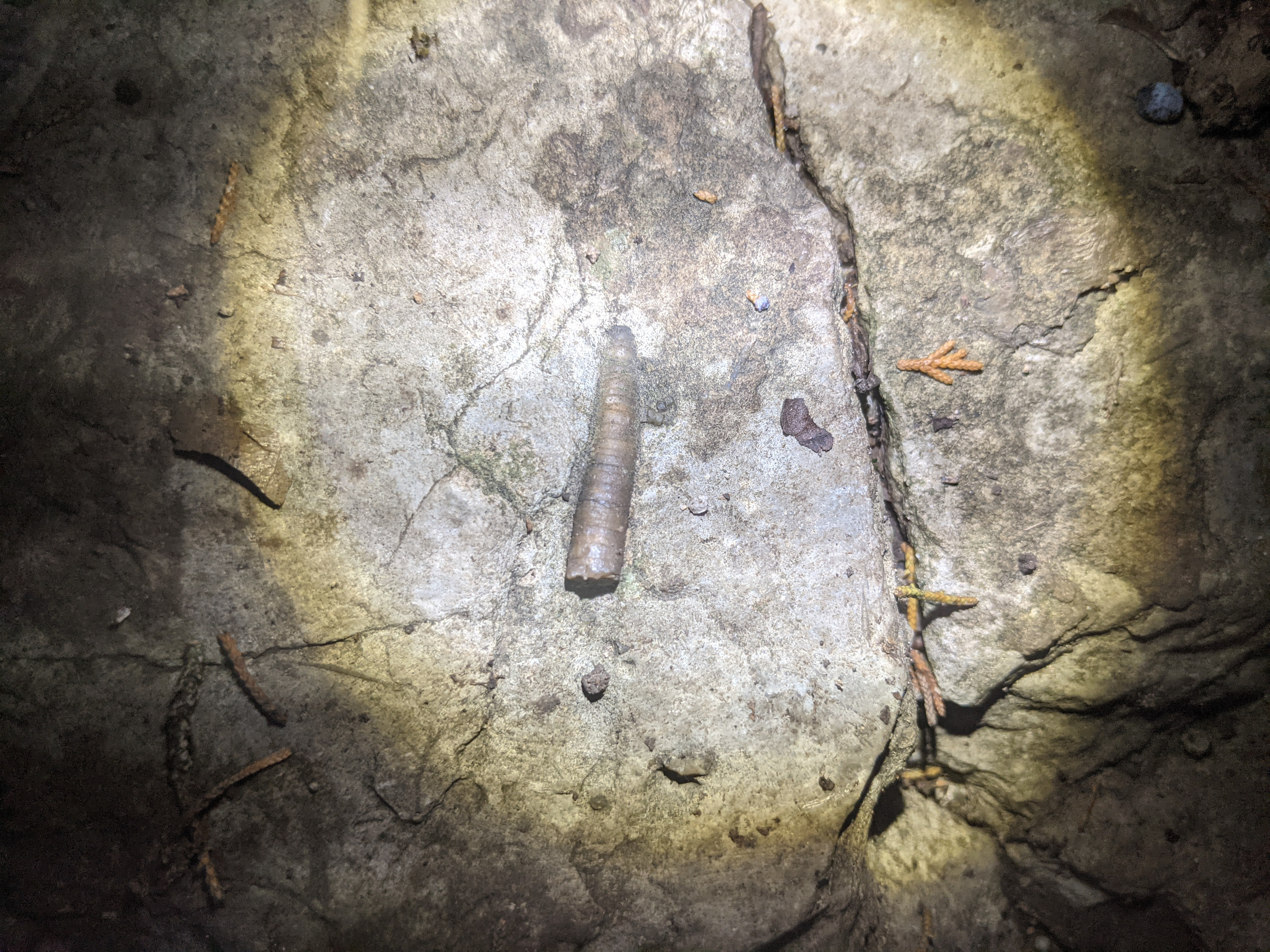
Rugose coral

== Archeology ==
Paleoindian arrowheads were reportedly found on the Rainbow Mountain. It would make sense that local people found shelter in the limestone crevices.

== Rainbow Mountain Nature Preserve ==
A 65-acre nature preserve owned by the City of Madison is located on the mountain. The preserve has over three miles of hiking trails, which are managed by the Land Trust of North Alabama. In 2024, a new half-mile trail called the "Rainbolt Trail" was added to the preserve, along with a new trailhead.
