= MV Rainbow =

A number of ships have been named Rainbow, including:

- MV Rainbow (1946), a Greek coaster in service 1967–77
- MV Rainbow (1952), a Cypriot cargo ship in service 1967–74
