= Rainbow skink =

Rainbow skink may refer to:

- Lampropholis delicata from Australia, otherwise known as garden skink
- Trachylepis margaritifera from Africa, otherwise known as rainbow mabuya
- Trachylepis quinquetaeniata from Africa, otherwise known as five-lined mabuya

== See also ==
- Skink
