= Rainbow Mountain (Alaska) =

Mountain in Alaska, United States

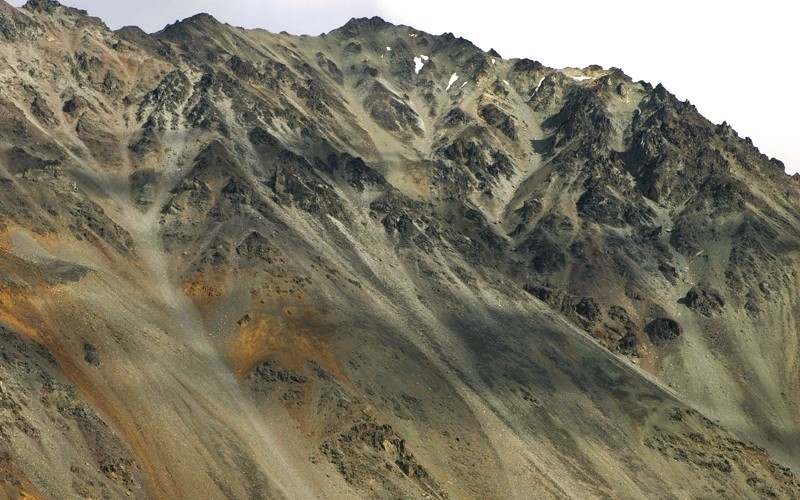
- West aspect

Highest point
- Elevation: 6,841 ft (2,085 m)
- Prominence: 700 ft (213 m)
- Isolation: 2.37 mi (3.81 km)
- Coordinates: 63°18′33″N 145°37′57″W

Geography
- Location within Alaska
- Interactive map of Rainbow Mountain
- Country: United States
- State: Alaska
- Census Area: Southeast Fairbanks
- Parent range: Alaska Range; Delta Mountains
- Topo map: USGS Mount Hayes B-4

Geology
- Rock age: Paleozoic

Rainbow Mountain is a 6,841-foot-elevation (2,085-meter) summit in Alaska, United States.

== Description ==
Rainbow Mountain is located 20 miles (32 km) northwest of Paxson in the Delta Mountains which are a subrange of the Alaska Range. It is the highest point of Rainbow Ridge. Precipitation runoff and glacial meltwater from the mountain's slopes drains into tributaries of the Delta River. Topographic relief is significant as the summit rises 4,200 feet (1,280 meters) above the Richardson Highway and Phelan Creek in 1.5 mile (2.4 km), and 3,200 feet (975 meters) above the Canwell Glacier in two miles (3.2 km). The Richardson Highway traverses the western base of Rainbow Ridge for approximately three miles, with the mountain's summit about midway along the ridge. Dall sheep and hoary marmot on the ridge can be seen from the highway.

The mountain is so named because of multi-colored talus which slides down its face, and the descriptive toponym has been officially adopted by the United States Board on Geographic Names. Yellow, pink, and green colors are from volcanic eruptions 300 to 350 million years ago, whereas brown and gray colors are from sandstone, siltstone and limestone layers. Minerals present include chrysocolla, serpentinite, hematite, chromite, quartz, calcite, pyrite, and malachite. Rainbow Ridge is an excellent site for collecting fossils of trilobites which are about 315 million years old.

== Climate ==
According to the Köppen climate classification system, Rainbow Mountain is located in a tundra climate zone with cold, snowy winters, and cool summers. Weather systems are forced upwards by the Delta Mountains (orographic lift), causing heavy precipitation in the form of rainfall and snowfall. Winter temperatures can drop below 0 °F with wind chill factors below −10 °F. This climate supports the Canwell Glacier and McCallum Glacier surrounding the peak.

== Gallery ==
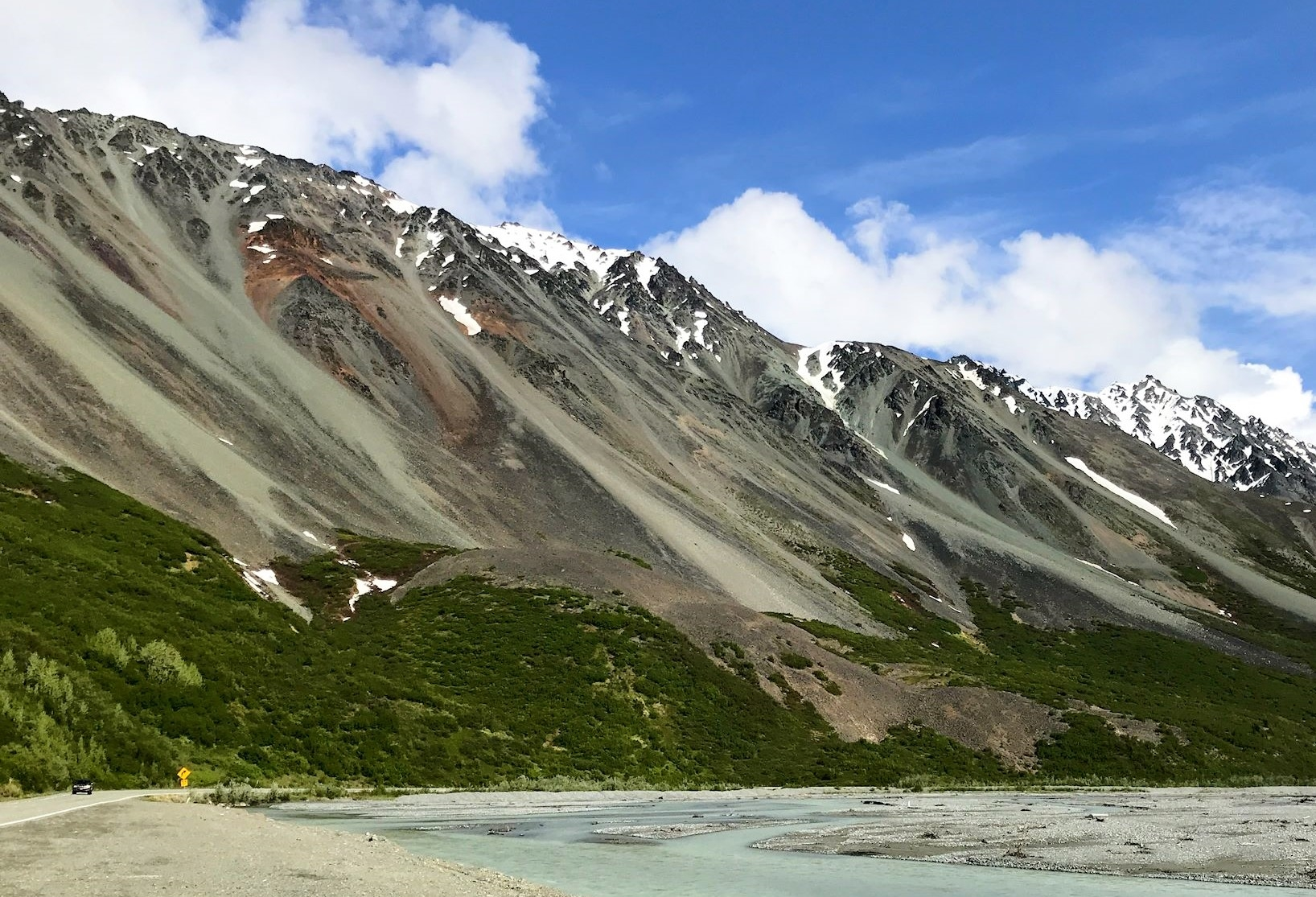
Rainbow Mountain/Rainbow Ridge from Richardson Highway

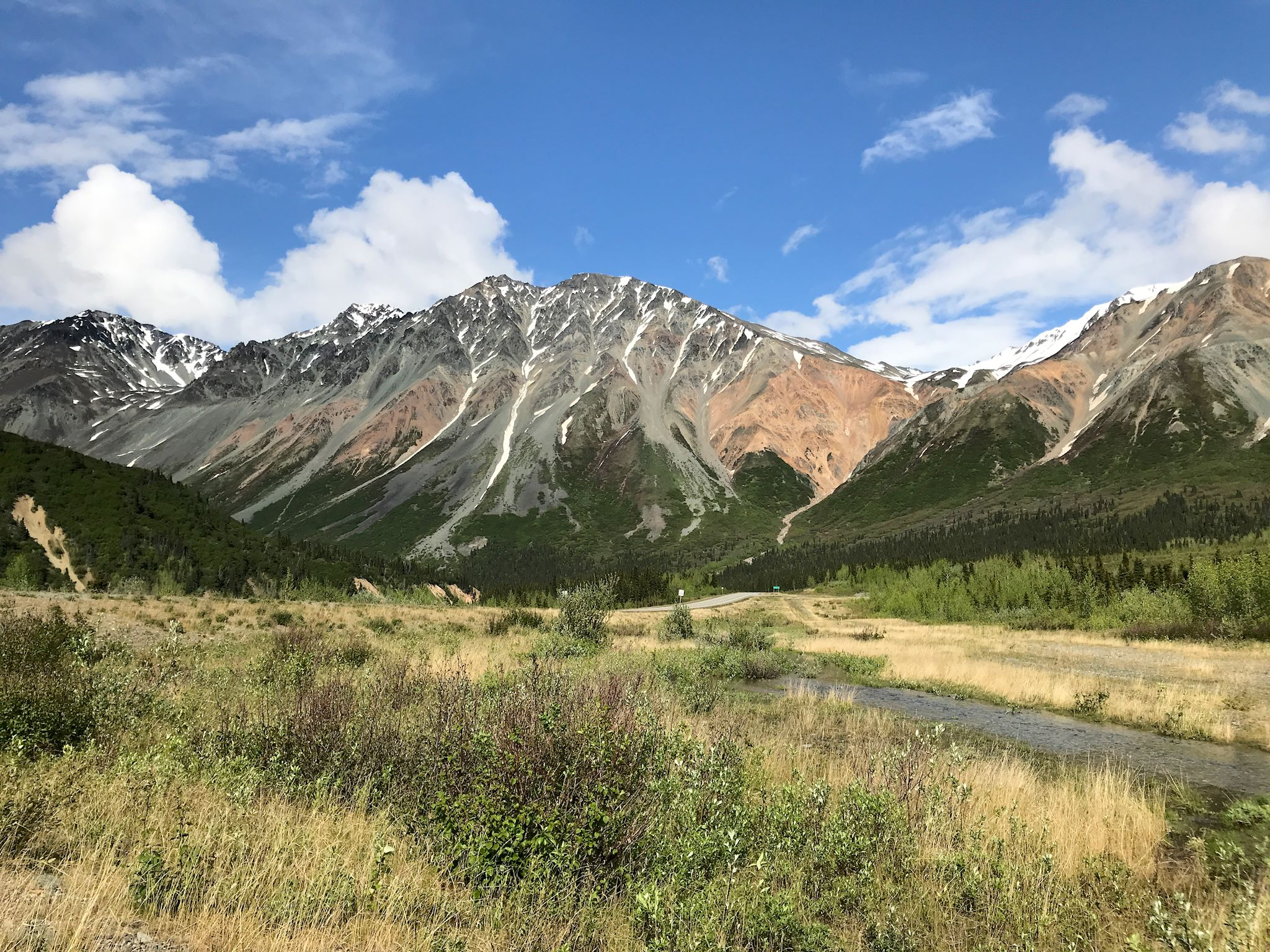
Rainbow Ridge

== See also ==
- Geography of Alaska
