= Rainbow Road (disambiguation) =

Rainbow Road is a fictional race course in the Mario Kart series.

It can also refer to:

- Rainbow Road (New Zealand), a back-country road from Hanmer Springs to Saint Arnaud
- Rainbow Road, a 2005 novel by Alex Sanchez
- "Rainbow Road," a song written by Donnie Fritts and Dan Penn, recorded by several musicians, including Steve Goodman, Arthur Alexander, and Joan Baez
- Rainbow Road, a 2010 album by Haruka Tomatsu
- The Rainbow Road to Oz, an unreleased 1950s Disney film
- Rainbow Bridge (pets)
