= Rainbow Warrior =

Rainbow Warrior(s), rainbow warrior(s), or Warriors of the Rainbow may refer to

== Arts and entertainment ==
=== Books ===
- Warriors of the Rainbow (1962), an evangelical religious tract by William Willoya and Vinson Brown, that inspired the Legend of the Rainbow Warriors, a fakelore environmentalist belief of fulfilling a Native American prophecy

=== Film and television ===
- The Rainbow Warrior (film), 1993, about the Greenpeace ship
- Warriors of the Rainbow: Seediq Bale, 2011 Taiwanese film
- "The Rainbow Warrior", an episode from season 2 of He-Man and the Masters of the Universe

=== Music ===
- "Rainbow Warrior", song by Bleak House, notable for inspiring "Welcome Home (Sanitarium)" by Metallica
- "Rainbow Warrior", song by The Buggles on their album Adventures in Modern Recording
- "Rainbow Warrior", song by Cobalt 60 on their album Twelve

=== Video games ===
- Rainbow Warrior (video game), 1989 videogame developed by Greenpeace

== Ships ==
- Rainbow Warrior (1955), former fishing trawler Sir William Hardy, acquired by Greenpeace in 1978 and sunk by the French intelligence service in 1985
  - Sinking of the Rainbow Warrior, in 1985
- Rainbow Warrior (1957), auxiliary three-masted schooner, acquired by Greenpeace in 1989
- Rainbow Warrior (2011), purpose-designed Greenpeace ship

== Sports ==
- Hawaii Rainbow Warriors, sports teams at the University of Hawai'i at Mānoa
- The Rainbow Warriors or Rainbow Warrior, nickname for Jeff Gordon's auto racing team or car

== Other uses ==
- Rainbow Warrior, self-description of executed murderer Joseph Mitchell Parsons (referring to Jeff Gordon)
- Rainbow warrior, nickname for Swedish human rights activist Linnéa Claeson

== See also ==
- Rainbow Family
- Rainbow flag
- Rainbow Gathering
- "Rainbowarriors", song by American band CocoRosie on their 2007 album The Adventures of Ghosthorse and Stillborn
