= France–New Zealand relations =

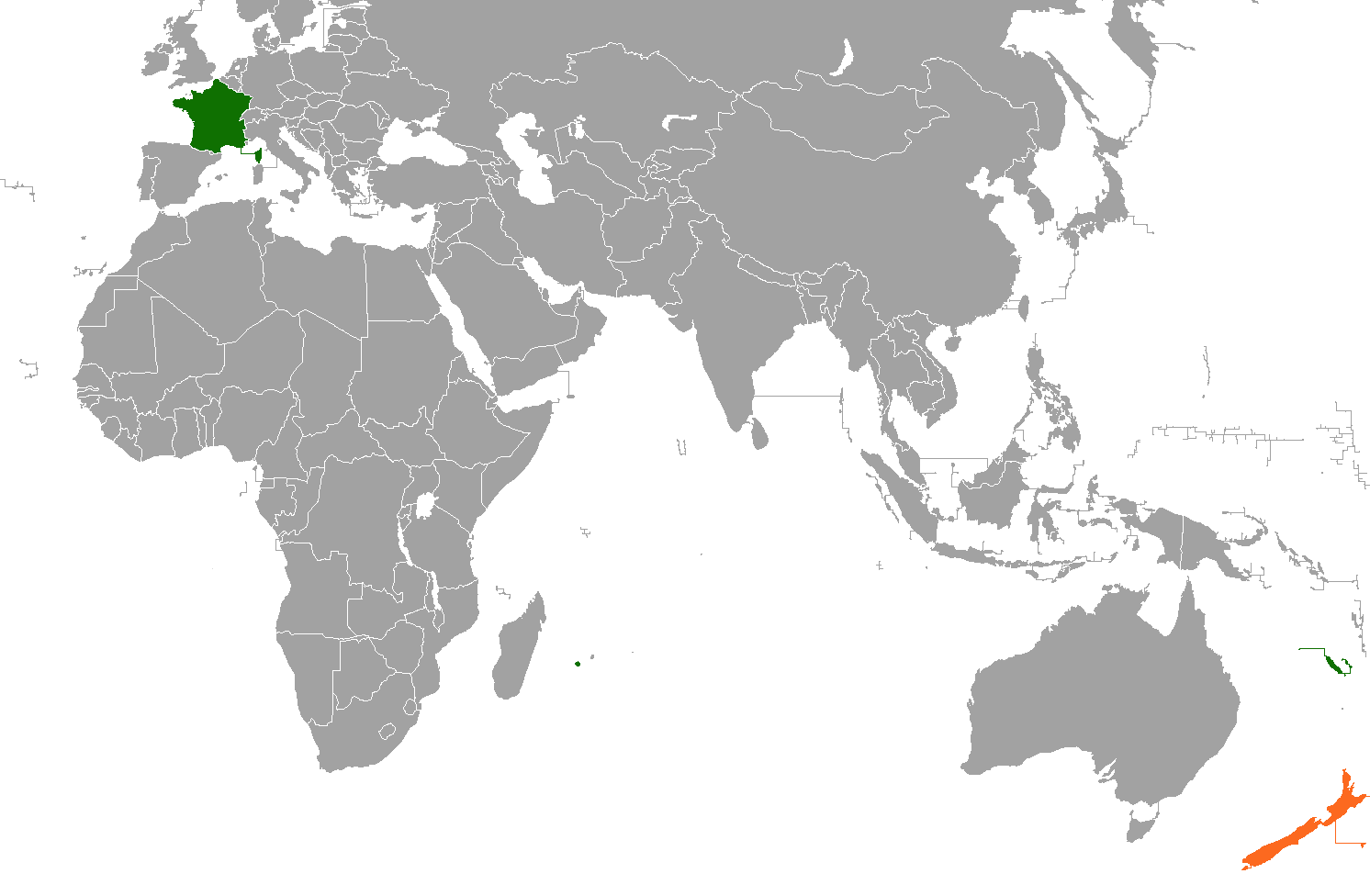

- France: New Zealand

France–New Zealand relations are the international relations between New Zealand and France. Relations between France and New Zealand have been rocky at times, but more recently have become much closer. Bilateral relations have been generally good since World War I and World War II, with both countries working closely during the conflicts, but the relationship was severely jeopardised by the sinking of the Rainbow Warrior in Auckland on 10 July 1985 by French Direction Générale de la Sécurité Extérieure (DGSE) agents.

Relations between the two nations had been strained earlier, and in 1973 the New Zealand government suspended postal relations with France for a time. Following the French attack on the Rainbow Warrior, France demanded from New Zealand to release the agents captured after the attack. To enforce their demand, the French Government put New Zealand under fierce economic strain. Since then there has been animosity among New Zealanders towards the French, though there has been thawing as the events recede into history and France has halted nuclear tests.

The New Zealand Prime Minister's official visit to France in 2003 opened a new chapter in bilateral relations, moving on from the past and focusing on rekindling both countries' ties, particularly in the South Pacific. With the exception of the transport of nuclear material, major political objectives are being worked-towards within the South Pacific. While the New Zealand government seeks closer dialogue and cooperation for political and financial reasons, France wishes to encourage the integration of the communities of the Pacific into the New Zealand regional environment.

== History ==
Relations between France and New Zealand were strained for two short periods in the 1980s and 1990s over the French nuclear tests at Moruroa and the bombing of the Rainbow Warrior in Auckland harbour. The latter was widely regarded as an act of state terrorism against New Zealand's sovereignty and was ordered by then French President François Mitterrand, although he denied any involvement at the time. These events worked to strengthen New Zealand's resolve to retain its anti-nuclear policy.

But relations had been cordial in the decades prior to the Rainbow Warrior incident, epitomised by New Zealand's swift reaction in both World Wars, siding both times with allied forces.

=== World War I ===
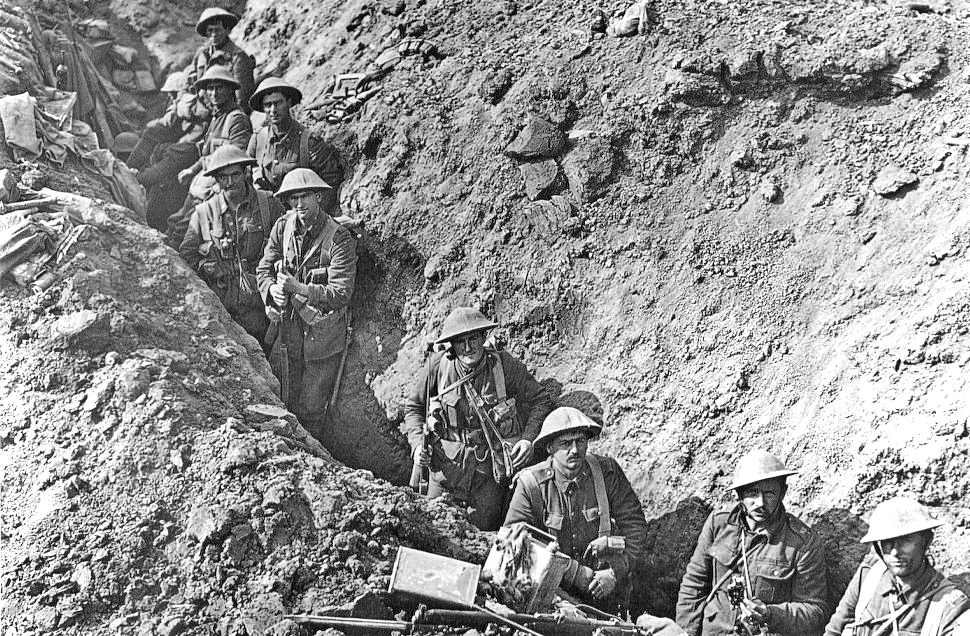
New Zealand infantry in the Battle of the Somme

The New Zealand government entered into the war without hesitation, despite its geographic isolation and small population. In France, the New Zealand Division participated in the Battle of the Somme, where they advanced three kilometres and captured eight kilometres of enemy front line. 7,048 had become casualties, of whom 1,560 were killed. In June 1917, the New Zealand Division further distinguished itself in the storming of Messines ridge and the capture of the village of Messines. During the fighting at Passchendaele in the following October, however, it was bloodily repulsed in its second attack, with 850 dead in exchange for no more than 500 yards of ground gained. This was the first time the division had failed in a major operation and remains the worst disaster in New Zealand's history in terms of lives lost in a single day.

=== World War II ===
New Zealand entered the Second World War by declaring war on Nazi Germany at 9.30 pm 3 September 1939 (NZT). Diplomatically, New Zealand had expressed vocal opposition to fascism in Europe and also to the appeasement of Fascist dictatorships. New Zealand participated heavily in many European campaigns, including the Battle of Greece and the Battle of Crete and especially in the Italian Campaign, and Royal New Zealand Air Force personnel took part in fighting in France during 1940 (as part of the Royal Air Force) and 1944.

=== French Indochina ===
During the French War in Indochina (Modern-day Vietnam, Laos and Cambodia) in 1952 and 1954, New Zealand provided from its obsolete and surplus but serviceable military stocks, a selection of military equipment for the French Forces in Indochina, including;

- 43000 Rifles
- 1350 Machine Guns
- 670000 Rounds of Small Arms Ammunition
- 10000 Rounds of 40mm Armour Piercing shot
- 500 Revolvers
- 50 Bofors Anti-Aircraft Guns and ammunition
- Wireless Sets
- Field Telephones
- Charging sets
- Various Uniform Items

=== Maritime Delimitation Agreement ===
The New Zealand–France Maritime Delimitation Agreement was signed on 30 June 2003. As a boundary delimitation agreement, it established the maritime boundary between Tokelau and Wallis and Futuna.

=== The "FRANZ" agreement ===
The FRANZ agreement was signed on 22 December 1992 by dignitaries of France, Australia & New Zealand. It commits its signatories to "exchange information to ensure the best use of their assets and other resources for relief operations after cyclones and other natural disasters in the region". While cyclones remain the chief natural disaster across the South Pacific, FRANZ has in practice been an effective system against the wide range of disasters experienced in the region.

The FRANZ Agreement applies to South Pacific and includes Australia, the Cook Islands, Fiji, French Polynesia, Kiribati, Nauru, New Caledonia, New Zealand, Niue, Papua New Guinea, Samoa, Solomon Islands, Tonga, Tokelau, Tuvalu, Vanuatu, Wallis and Futuna, and others decided on a case-by-case basis.

=== Christchurch Call ===
In the wake of the Christchurch mosque shootings on 15 March 2019, New Zealand Prime Minister Jacinda Ardern and French President Emmanuel Macron co-hosted the Christchurch Call to Action Summit in May 2019, which pledged to counter violent extremism on the Internet.

== Sinking of the Rainbow Warrior ==
Codenamed Operation Satanic, the Sinking of the Rainbow Warrior took place in New Zealand's Auckland Harbour on 10 July 1985. It was an attack carried out by French DGSE agents aimed at sinking the flagship craft of the Greenpeace Organization to stop her from interfering in a nuclear test by the French Government at Mururoa Atoll in the South Pacific. Greenpeace was opposed to testing and had planned to lead a flotilla of yachts to the atoll to protest against the test, including an incursion into French military zones. The incident occurred late at night when two agents Captain Dominique Prieur and Commander Alain Mafart attached two Limpet mines to the hull of the ship and detonated them 10 minutes apart. The attack resulted in the death of Greenpeace photographer Fernando Pereira and lead to a huge uproar over the first ever attack on New Zealand Sovereignty. The act sparked one of the most intense police investigations in New Zealand history and eventually led to the capture of both Mafart and Prieur passing themselves off as "Sophie and Alain Turenge." Both pleaded guilty to manslaughter and were sentenced to 10 years imprisonment on 22 November 1985.

France threatened an economic embargo of New Zealand's exports to the European Economic Community if the pair were not immediately released. Such an action would have been crippling to the New Zealand economy which at that time was heavily dependent on agricultural exports to Britain. Operation Satanic was a public relations disaster. New Zealand was an ally of France. France initially denied any involvement, and even joined in condemnation of it as a terrorist act.

This act of state terrorism badly strained bilateral relations and in July 1986, a United Nations-sponsored mediation between New Zealand and France resulted in the transfer of the two prisoners to the French Polynesian island of Hao, to serve three years instead, as well as an apology and a NZD 13 million payment from France to New Zealand.

== Sport ==
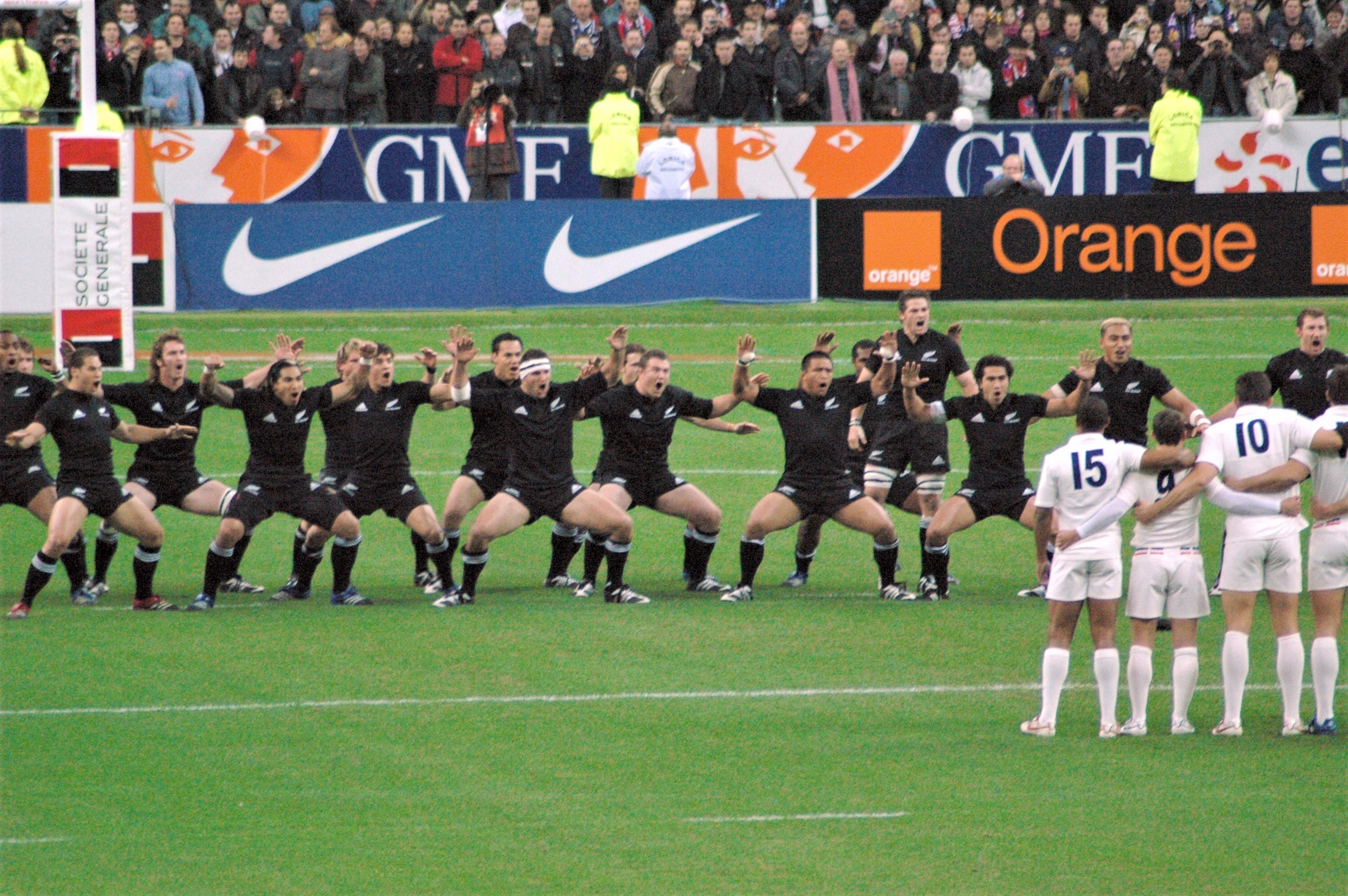
The All Blacks performing a haka prior to a Test match against France in 2006.

The French and New Zealand national rugby union have been playing each other for over a century. Since their first match, in January 1906 in Paris, and January 2008, they have played 46 Test matches. The historic 1906 match, which France lost 38–8, was the first ever French Test but it was not until 1954 (when they won 3–0) that they were able to secure their first win over the New Zealanders.

Then the Second World War intervened, suspending competition. In 1946, France played two matches against the New Zealand Expeditionary Force's Kiwis, losing both matches.

France first toured New Zealand in 1961 – before any of the home nations. – and the All Blacks won all three Tests. Overall the All Blacks have won 34 Tests, France 11, with one drawn.

France and the All Blacks met in the final of the inaugural Rugby World Cup. The tournament was co-hosted by New Zealand and Australia and the final was held at Eden Park. The All Blacks were captained by David Kirk and went on to win their first World Cup 29–9. According to the All Blacks' coach at the time, Brian Lochore, the previous year's loss in Nantes was the catalyst for their World Cup victory. Shelford said of the match "We wanted to play them in the final because we wanted revenge". The match also helped improve the diplomatic and political rift between France and New Zealand caused by the 1985 bombing of the Rainbow Warrior by French Secret Service agents.

The Dave Gallaher Trophy was introduced in 2000 to be contested between the two teams. It was named in memory of All Blacks captain Dave Gallaher who captained the All Blacks against France in 1906 and who died at the Battle of Passchendaele during World War I. The Cup was first contested on Armistice Day (11 November) 2000. The All Blacks won 39–26 and scored two tries while Andrew Mehrtens scored nine penalties.

France hosted the 2007 World Cup, and the two teams met in the tournament quarter-finals. Despite France hosting the tournament the match was held at the Millennium Stadium in Cardiff, Wales. The match was won by France 20–18, and involved several controversial decisions by referee Wayne Barnes, who subsequently received death threats from some New Zealand fans. France scored one try after the sin binning of All Blacks second five-eighth Luke McAlister, and another from a forward pass unseen by the referee. The All Blacks were strongly criticised for not attempted a drop goal in the game's final minutes. Their performance was analysed by Palmerston North based company Verusco who had analysed 1,500 games since 2000. They discovered that the All Blacks made 57 tackles to Frances' 269, and they had 66 percent possession and 60 percent territory. The playing time, that is time the ball is in play, was the longest of any game Verusco had ever recorded.

France and New Zealand met in the final of the 2011 World Cup, held in New Zealand. New Zealand won their second World Title 8–7 in a tightly fought battle.

== Trade and investment ==
New Zealand and France have been very large trading partners in recent years, with France being New Zealand 15th Largest Trading Partner for 2007 with exports totalling NZD$401.3 million (mainly: Sheepmeat, fish fillets, venison and medicaments) and imports totalling NZD$679.6 million (mainly:Motor vehicles, wine and machinery equipment).

France has numerous and some large, investments in the New Zealand economy, particularly in New Zealands wine industry which include Veuve Clicquot, Deutz which is very similar to the wine industry in France. Yoplait is a major company in New Zealand having one of the most well-known yoghurt brands in the New Zealand agri-food sector. Other major French investments have been made in New Zealand's transport and communications sector (Alstom, Alcatel) and waste management (ONYX)

== Military co-operation ==
There have been various campaigns where New Zealand and France have fought alongside one another, more prominently World War I and World War II.

New Zealand and France also participate regularly in war games, mainly in the Pacific Ocean, off the New Zealand coast. These games also include in Australia. This increase in military cooperation has warmed relations in both nations, with Jeanne d'Arc's, Captain Phillippe Combes saying of the March 2001 exercise: "During the period of the French nuclear tests we were embarrassed to come into this region, but since they have halted we are seen with a more benevolent eye and are welcomed everywhere we go." These games included both RNZN warships and RNZAF warplanes and, in accordance with New Zealand Nuclear Free Zone, Disarmament, and Arms Control Act, French nuclear submarine FNS Perle, highlighting increased military co-operation in the Pacific between the three countries.

Craft involved in the 2001 wargame:

- HMNZS Te Kaha
- HMA Ships Brisbane, Melbourne, Anzac, Arunta, Huon, Norman, and Success
- FN Ships Vendémiaire, Jeanne d'Arc, and Georges Leygues

Simulated attacks on the ships were also carried out, in order to test anti-aircraft defence systems, by RNZAF Skyhawks and RAAF Hornets.

Commanding officer of the Vendémiaire Olivier Beauchêne stated: "This is the first time the French Navy takes part in this kind of exercise, and at this level, with Australian and New Zealand armies. This is evidence of the good quality of relations between the three countries." Since the mid-'90s, the armed forces of France, Australia and New Zealand have been co-operating on maritime surveillance of the small island states of the region.

== Bilateral representation ==
There are many official contacts between New Zealand and the French Republic, which provide the opportunity for high-level discussions and the continued development of bilateral relations. Many ministers meet with their French counterparts at international meetings and events.

=== French tours by New Zealand delegates and ministers ===
New Zealand Ministerial Visits to France

Dates	Minister/Delegate	Cities visited	Reason
April 2011	Prime Minister of New Zealand, John Key		Official Visit including ANZAC Day commemorations (en route to the wedding of the Prince William and Catherine Middleton)
May 2007	Minister of Foreign Affairs and Trade, Defence, and Disarmament and Arms Control, Phil Goff		Official Visit
March 2007	Minister of Science, Research and Technology, Steve Maharey		Official Visit
November 2006	Prime Minister of New Zealand, Helen Clark		Official Visit
June 2006	Minister of Foreign Affairs Rt Hon Winston Peters	Paris	Official Visit
June 2006	Minister of Energy, David Parker		Official Visit
May 2006	Minister of Foreign Affairs and Trade, Defence, Phil Goff	Paris	Official Visit
February 2006	Minister of Agriculture and Fisheries, Jim Anderton		Official Visit
April – May 2005	Minister for Transport Safety, Assoc Minister of Energy, Harry Duynhoven		Official Visit
September 2004	Minister of Energy, RS&T, CRIs, Pete Hodgson		Official Visit
September 2004	Minister of Foreign Affairs and Trade, Phil Goff		Official Visit
June 2004	Prime Minister of New Zealand, Helen Clark		Official Visit
May 2004	Minister for Trade Negotiations, Jim Sutton		Official Visit
April 2004	Speaker of the House, Jonathan Hunt		Led a Parliamentary Delegation to France
June 2003	Minister of Health, Annette King		Official Visit
May 2003	Minister of Energy, Pete Hodgson		Official Visit
April 2003	Minister for Trade Negotiations, Jim Sutton		
April 2003	Associate Minister of Foreign Affairs and Trade, Marian Hobbs		Official Visit
May 2002	Minister for Trade Negotiations, Jim Sutton		Official Visit
May 2001	Minister of Energy, Pete Hodgson		Official Visit
May 2001	Minister for Trade Negotiations, Jim Sutton		Official Visit
November 2000	Minister of Sport, Trevor Mallard		Official Visit
September 2000	Minister of Finance, Michael Cullen		Official Visit
June 2000	Minister for Trade Negotiations, Jim Sutton		Official Visit
May 1999	Minister of International Trade, Dr Lockwood Smith		
May 1998	Governor-General HE Rt Hon Sir Michael Hardie Boys		Official Visit
April 1998	Speaker of the House, Doug Kidd		Led a Parliamentary Delegation to France
October 1997	Prime Minister of New Zealand, Jim Bolger		Official Visit

=== New Zealand tours by French delegates ===
French delegations to New Zealand

Dates	Minister/Delegate	Cities visited	Reason
August 2014	Member of Parliament representing French citizens domiciled overseas, Thierry Mariani	Auckland, Wellington and Christchurch	Official Visit
March 2007	Minister of Trade, Christine Lagarde		Official Visit
May 2006	Vice President National Assembly, Yves Bur		Official Visit
April 2006	Minister for Overseas France, François Baroin		Official Visit
February 2005	Minister for Veterans' Affairs, Hamlaoui Mékachéra		Official Visit
November 2003	Secretary of State for Foreign Affairs, Renaud Muselier		Official Visit
August 2003	Chair of France/NZ Friendship Group in the National Assembly, Philippe Vitel		Official Visit
March 2003	Minister for External Trade, François Loos		Official Visit
September 2001	Chair of France/NZ Friendship Group in the Senate, Maurice Blin		Led a Senate delegation to New Zealand
November/December 2000	Chair of France/NZ Friendship Group in the National Assembly, Gabriel Montcharmont		Led a France/NZ friendship group delegation to New Zealand
September 2000	Minister of Agriculture, Jean Glavany		Official Visit
June 1999	Secretary of State for Overseas Territories, Jean-Jack Queyranne		Official Visit
April 1998	Secretary of State for War Veterans, Jean-Pierre Masseret		Official Visit

== Resident diplomatic missions ==
- France has an embassy in Wellington.
- New Zealand has an embassy in Paris and a consulate-general in Nouméa.
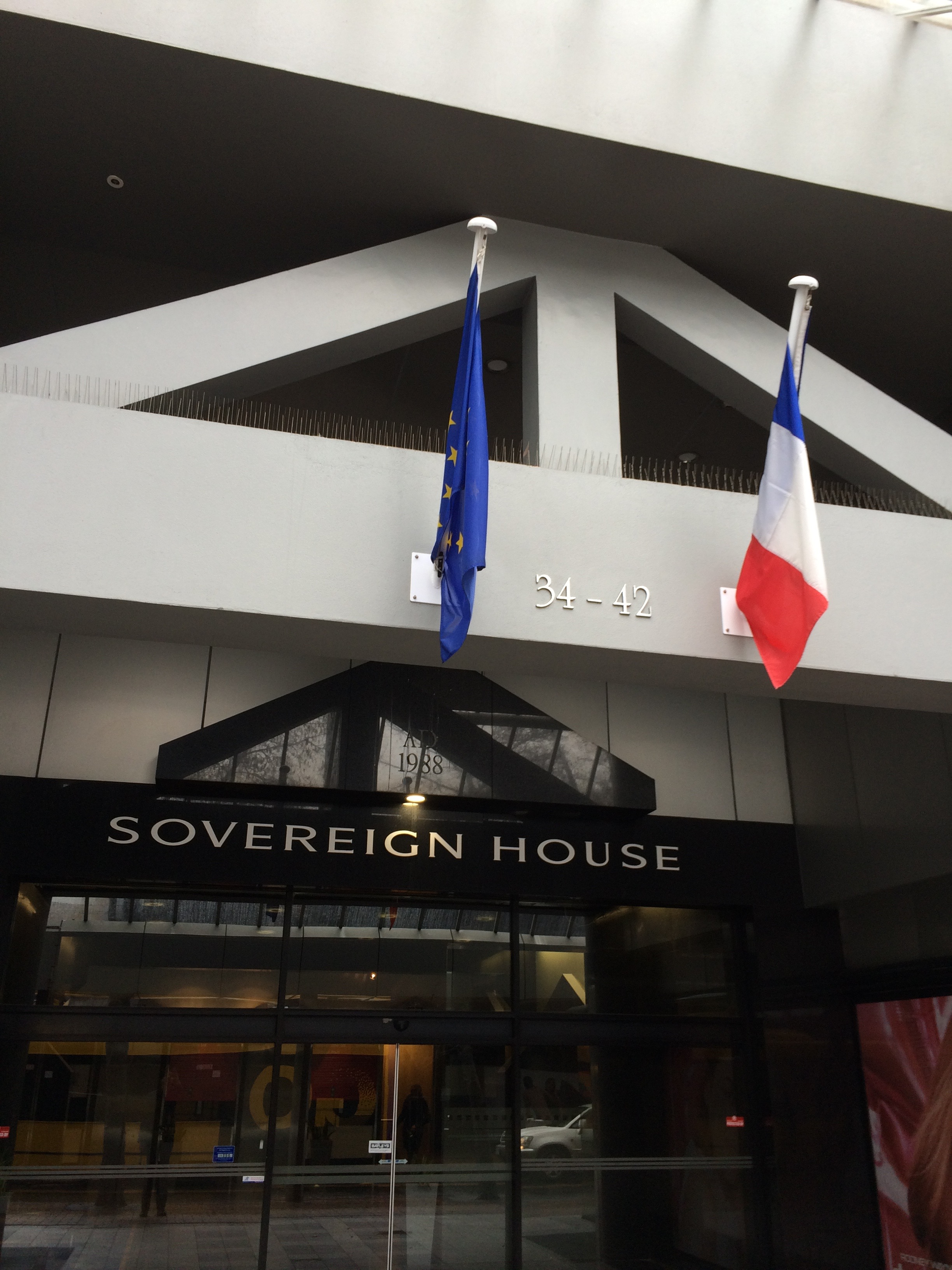
Embassy of France in Wellington

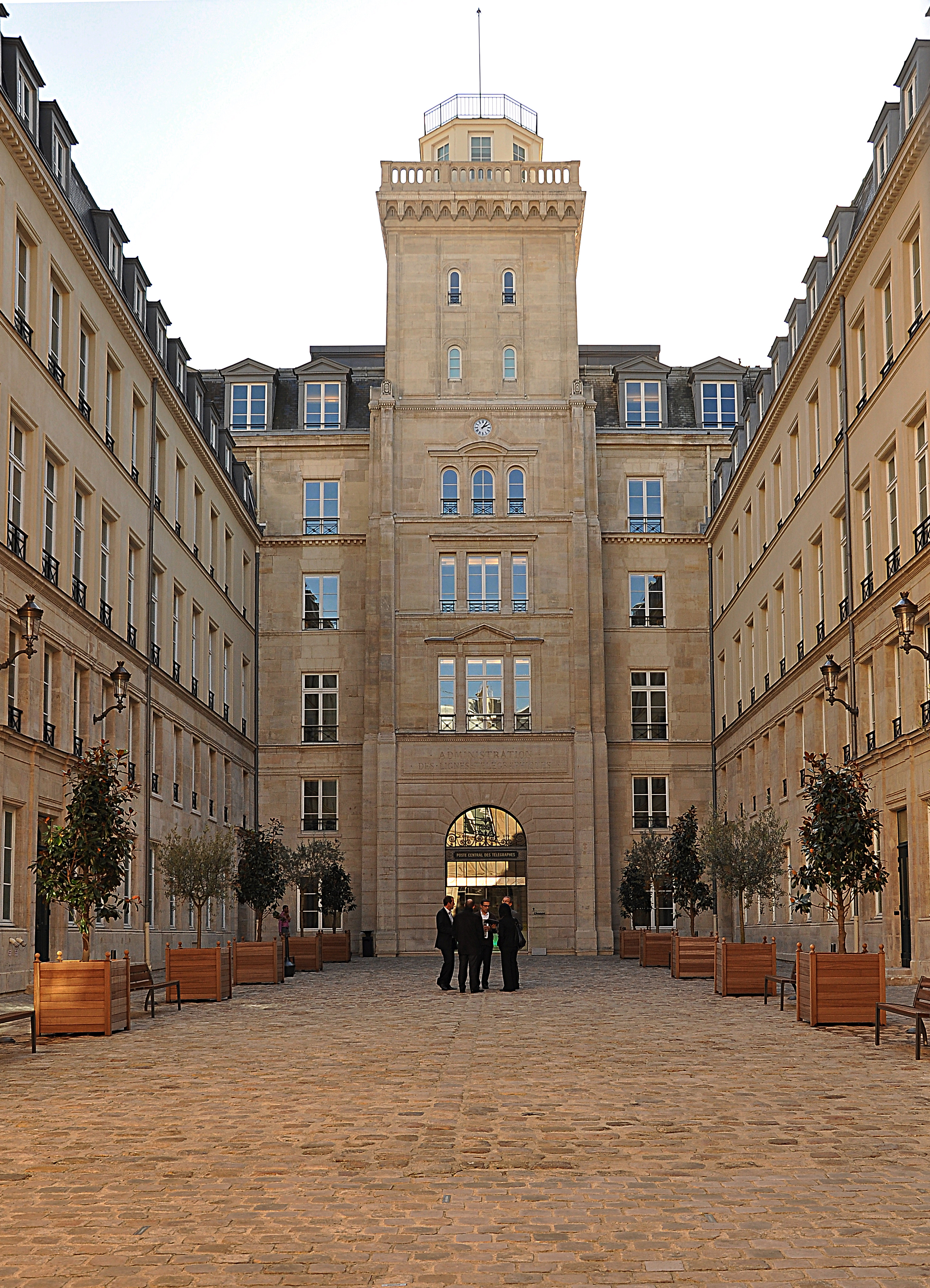
Embassy of New Zealand in Paris

== See also ==
- Foreign relations of France
- Foreign relations of New Zealand
