= The Rainbow Warrior Conspiracy =

1988 Australian–New Zealand mini-series

- Written by: David Phillips
- Directed by: Chris Thomson
- Starring: Jack Thompson; Brad Davis
- Theme music composer: Martin Armiger
- Countries of origin: Australia; New Zealand
- Original language: English
- No. of episodes: 2 × 2 hours

Production
- Producer: Robert J Loader
- Production companies: 7 Network; Golden Dolphin

Original release
- Network: Seven Network
- Release: 9 October 1988

The Rainbow Warrior Conspiracy is a 1988 Australian–New Zealand mini-series based on the Sinking of the Rainbow Warrior. It was written by David Phillips, and directed by Chris Thomson, and stars Jack Thompson, Brad Davis and Germain Houde.

== Plot ==
From 1978 to 1985, the Rainbow Warrior was the flagship of the Greenpeace fleet, active in supporting a number of anti-whaling, anti-seal hunting, anti-nuclear testing and anti-nuclear waste dumping campaigns, during that period. In 1985 it was at the Port of Auckland in New Zealand on its way to a protest against a planned French nuclear test in Moruroa. It was sunk by a bombing operation by the "action" branch of the French foreign intelligence services, the Direction générale de la sécurité extérieure (DGSE), carried out on 10 July 1985. Fernando Pereira, a photographer, drowned on the sinking ship.

== Cast ==
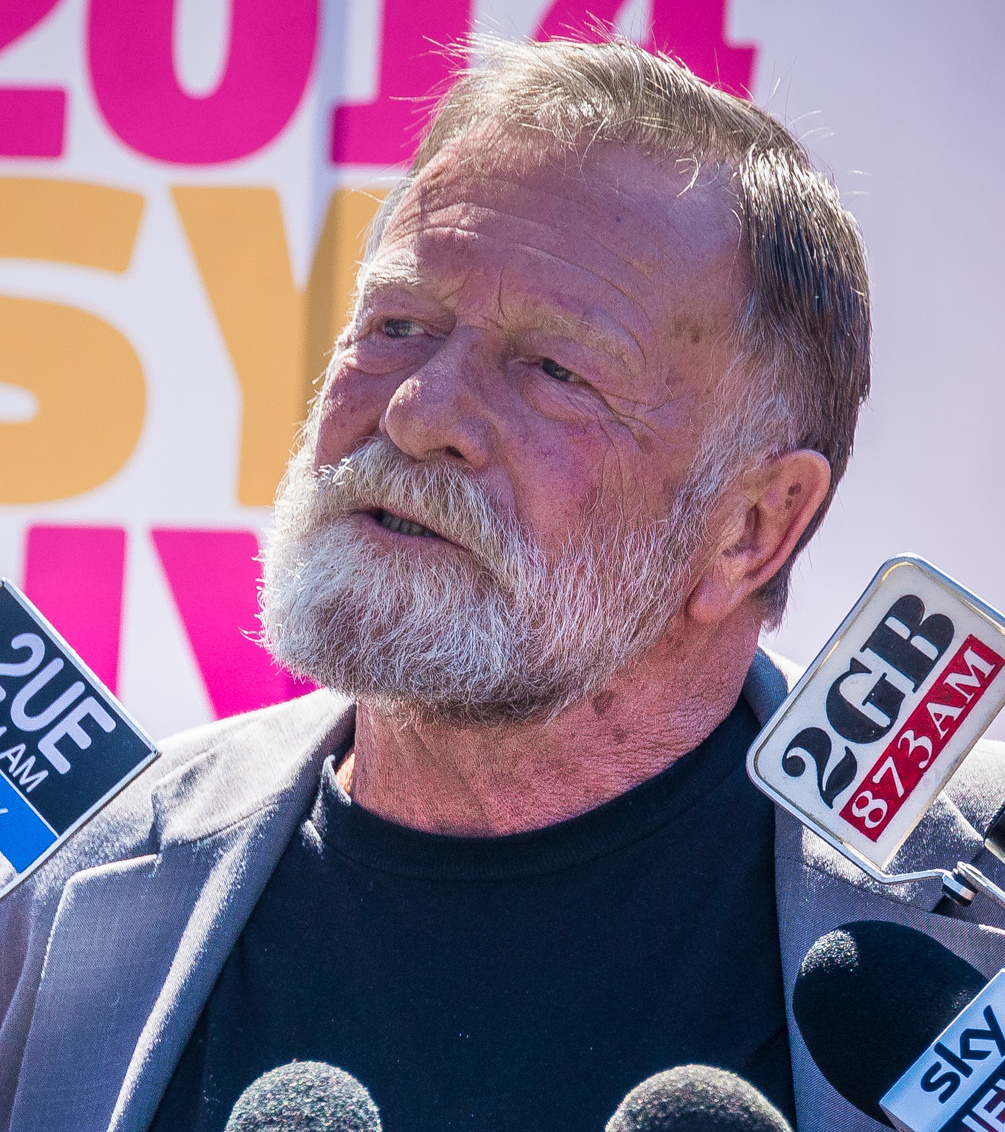
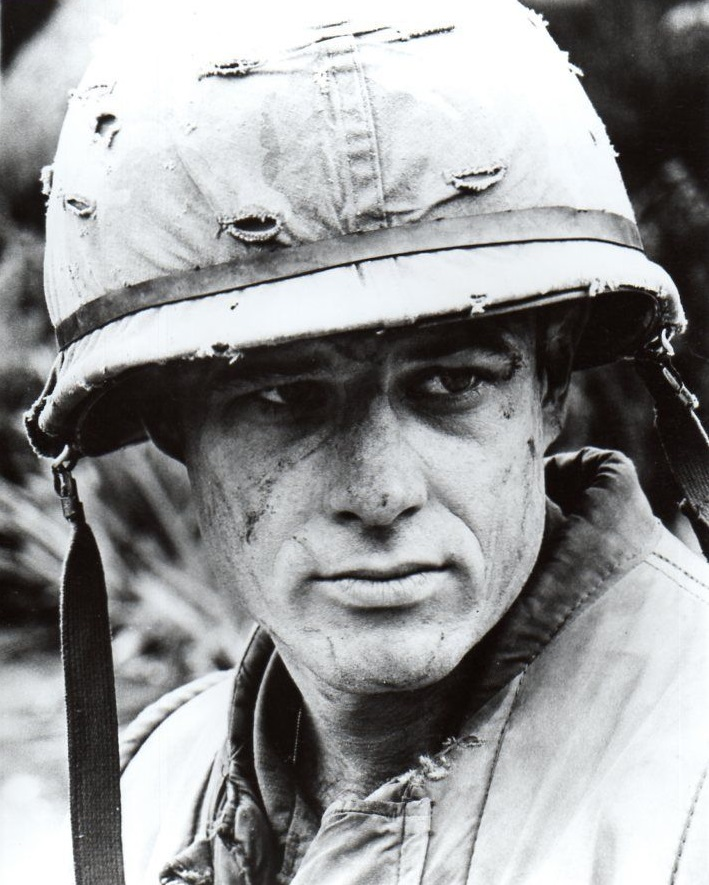
Top to bottom: Jack Thompson and Brad Davis
- Jack Thompson as Stuart Irvine
- Brad Davis as Neil Travers
- Germain Houde as Alain Mafart
- Louise Laparé as Dominique Prieur
- Peter Carroll as Louis-Pierre Dillais
- Guy Thauvette as Manignet
- Bruno Lawrence as Terry Batchelor
- Christian Manon as French Priest
- Alex Menglet as Velche
- Gary Day
- Justin Monjo as Hendrick
- Alastair Duncan as Hernu

== See also ==
- The Rainbow Warrior, 1993 film
