= The Rainbow Warrior (film) =

1993 film by Michael Tuchner

- Written by: Martin Copeland; Scott Busby
- Directed by: Michael Tuchner
- Starring: Jon Voight; Sam Neill; Lucy Lawless; Kerry Fox
- Music by: Paul Buckmaster; Steve Tyrell
- Countries of origin: New Zealand; United States
- Original language: English

Production
- Executive producers: Bonny Dore; Greg Strangis
- Producer: Sam Strangis
- Production locations: Auckland, New Zealand
- Cinematography: Warrick Attewell
- Editor: Noel Rogers
- Running time: 90 minutes
- Production company: Bony Dore Productions

Original release
- Network: ABC
- Release: 24 May 1993

The Rainbow Warrior (sometimes called The Sinking of the Rainbow Warrior) is a 1993 made-for-television drama film directed by Michael Tuchner and starring Jon Voight and Sam Neill.

== Plot summary ==
The film is based on the true story of the Greenpeace ship Rainbow Warrior, which was sunk in Waitematā Harbour in Auckland, New Zealand, on 10 July 1985 by French DGSE operatives, when it was preparing for a Pacific voyage to protest against French nuclear testing. The film chronicles the police investigation to discover what happened to the ship and who was responsible.

== Cast ==
- Jon Voight as Peter Willcox
- Sam Neill as Alan Galbraith
- Bruno Lawrence as Terry Batchelor
- Kerry Fox as Andrea Joyce
- John Callen as David Lange
- Stacey Pickren
- Michael Mizrahi
- Tony Barry as Greenpeace activist
- Peter Hambleton as Maury Whitham
- Greg Johnson as Bert White
- Stephen O'Rourke as Eddie
- Stig Eldred as Steve Sawyer
- Lucy Lawless as Jane Redmond
- Dale Stevens as Amy
- Alison Bruce as Leslie Holbrook
- Mark Ferguson as Detective Neil Morris
- Nigel Harbrow as Fernando Pereira
- Bert Van Dijk as Bruno Ullman
- Joanna Briant as Detective Robin Borrie
- Clinton Ulyatt as Constable Adam Kelly
- Donogh Rees as Lab supervisor
- Bruce Phillips as Doctor Nicolas Legrange
- Bruce Allpress as Hec Crene
- Ken Blackburn as Gerard Curry
- Te Whatanui Skipwith as Rongelap man
- Martyn Sanderson as Uncle Emile
- Gerard Sanna as Andre Florian
- Patrice LeGrand as Antoine Riverol
- Simon Prast as Louis Deschamps
- Stephane Tyrode as Pierre Duval
- Serge Renault as Ouvea crewman #2
- Michael Cassin as Ouevea crewman #1
- Peter Hayden as Captain
- Jane Holland as Bartender
- John Sumner as Judge
- Grant Bridger as Police specialist
- Eru Potaka Dewes as Maori speaker
- Nicholas Rogers as Logger #1
- Lawrence Wharerau as Logger #2
- Nigel Godfrey as Yachtsman
- Peter Nicoll as Watchman #1
- Tim Cronin as Watchman #2
- Fritz Wollner as Greenpeace man
- Rachel Watkins as Newman's clerk
- Ruth Dudding as French reporter
- Nancy Schroder as Airline representative
- Stephen Hall as French naval officer
- Tony Hurst as Police diver
- Shannon Gray as Secretary

== See also ==
- The Rainbow Warrior Conspiracy, 1988 mini-series
- Sinking of the Rainbow Warrior
- Rainbow Warrior Case
- List of films about nuclear issues
