= Rainbow Warrior Case =

1986 dispute between New Zealand and France

The Rainbow Warrior Case was a dispute between New Zealand and France that arose in the aftermath of the sinking of the Rainbow Warrior. It was arbitrated by UN Secretary-General Javier Pérez de Cuéllar in 1986, and became significant in the subject of public international law for its implications on state responsibility.

== Background ==
On 10 July 1985, an undercover operation conducted by the French military security service (DGSE) sank the Dutch-registered Greenpeace ship Rainbow Warrior berthed in Auckland Harbour, killing a Portuguese photographer, Fernando Pereira. The Greenpeace ship was planning to disrupt French nuclear tests on the islands of French Polynesia. New Zealand subsequently caught and convicted two members of the French secret forces.

== Legal consequences ==
After a series of diplomatic confrontations between France and New Zealand pertaining primarily to issues of compensation and the treatment of the apprehended agents, both governments decided to have their differences arbitrated by a tribunal chaired by then Secretary-General of the UN, Javier Pérez de Cuéllar. His binding ruling was pronounced on 6 July 1986.

== The case ==
Even though the actions of the French state were not a threat to "international peace and security" as held by the UN Charter due to their limited objectives and impact, they were widely held to be acts of international delinquency comprising breach of sovereignty and espionage (though peacetime espionage is not covered by international law). The French memorandum to the secretary general argued that Greenpeace was engaging in "hostile actions" and "illegal penetration" of French territory around the test site and New Zealand acted as a platform for those actions. These arguments were rejected as not fulfilling any of the criteria of international law pertaining to the use of force.

=== State responsibility ===
Nowadays conduct which would qualify as an Internationally Wrongful Act committed by an agent of a State can attributed to it via Art. 5 ARSIWA (compare for instance the Teheran Hostages Case by the ICJ), resulting in the obligation of cessation of the wrongful act, assurances of non-repetition and reparation, compare Art. 30 and 31 ARSIWA.

France sought to rely on the doctrine of force majeure in that the medical grounds used to repatriate the agents was unforeseen and beyond its control, thus the treaty's obligation for detention would be impossible. The Arbitration Panel rejected the use of force majeure; while repatriation was justified, the performance of France's obligations under the treaty was not yet rendered impossible.

=== The ruling ===
France, having admitted responsibility, focused its efforts on the repatriation of its servicemen. This was agreed to by New Zealand on the condition that they would serve out the rest of their sentences. A compromise was reached by the mediation of the UN secretary general to three-year sentences on the French atoll of Hao (at a French naval base). France ultimately returned both agents to mainland France and freed them by May 1988, after less than two years on the atoll.

In terms of reparations, France initially offered an official apology and acknowledgement of breach of international law. Additionally, the UN secretary-general awarded New Zealand US$6.5 million and a further NZ$3.5 million to establish the New Zealand / France Friendship Fund. This is in addition to compensation which France paid to Pereira's family and to Greenpeace (settled privately).

== Consequences ==
The Rainbow Warrior case bolsters the notion that there is a doctrine of non-intervention in international law and that states will be punished for contravening it. It is also an interesting study of state responsibility, individual responsibility, use of force and reparations. Its consideration for international law is slightly hampered by the fact that it was decided by a single individual (the UN secretary general) as a special Tribunal not internationally established. This is because there existed jurisdictional obstacles for an application to the International Court of Justice by New Zealand, most importantly of which was that France did not (and still does not) recognise the jurisdiction of the Court as compulsory.

== See also ==
- The Rainbow Warrior Conspiracy, 1988 miniseries
- The Rainbow Warrior, 1993 film

== Sources ==
- Michael Pugh: "Legal Aspects of the Rainbow Warrior Affair", The International and Comparative Law Quarterly, Vol. 36, No. 3. (Jul., 1987), pp. 655–669,
- Rainbow Warrior (NEW ZEALAND v. FRANCE) France-New Zealand Arbitration Tribunal. 30 April 1990
