= René Imbot =

French soldier and military officer (1925–2007)

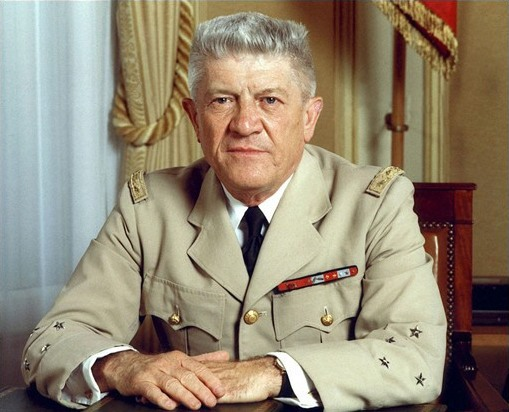
Imbot in 1983

René Imbot (French: [ʁəne ɛ̃bo]; 17 March 1925 – 19 February 2007) was a French general. In 1983, he was appointed as Head of the French Army. Two years later he reached the normal French army retirement age, but after the sinking of the Rainbow Warrior caused Admiral Pierre Lacoste to lose the position, Imbot took over as head of Overseas Intelligence ("Direction générale de la sécurité extérieure" / DGSE).

== Life ==
René Imbot was born into a military family in Roussillon, Vaucluse. When he was just 16 he joined the resistance Maquillards in the Allier department in central France. By that time he had already attended the military preparatory academy at Épinal and the Prytanée National Militaire, which he left in 1941.

In September 1944, he joined the "marche de la Corrèze" regiment and took part in the liberation struggle in the Belfort region. Once the fighting was over he passed the entrance exam for the prestigious Saint Cyr special military academy, from which he later progressed to the Cherchell military academy in Algeria.

He first posting as an officer came in 1946 when he was given command of the 13th Demi-Brigade of the Foreign Legion in Indochina. He served two terms. In January 1952, he was promoted to the rank of captain and assigned to the 4th Infantry Regiment of the Foreign Legion in Morocco, where he remained till 1954. He then undertook Staff college training before returning to Morocco, initially with the divisional staff at Meknes and then in command of the 26th Infantry Division at Fez.

In 1958, he went off to undertake a further training at the United States Army Command and General Staff College at Fort Leavenworth in Kansas (USA). Returning in 1959, he was assigned to NATO (Atomic Planning Section) and sent to Heidelberg for the three years 1959-1962. Here he was promoted to Battalion leader.

In 1964, Imbot emerged from a further training period at the War College as a major and took command as a Group Company Commander of the 51st Motorised Infantry Regiment based at Beauvais. He was promoted again in April 1966, now becoming a lieutenant colonel, and was assigned to the military personnel department of the French Army (DPMAT). In 1969, now a colonel, he took command of the 35th Mechanised Infantry Regiment at Belfort. When that command came to an end he returned to the DPMAT as Chief of the Infantry Office. In 1974, he took command of the First Mechanised Brigade at Saarburg in West Germany. The next year he was promoted to brigadier general and the next year he took commande of the Infantry Academy at Montpelier.

Made a divisional general in 1978, on 15 September 1979 he was appointed deputy military governor of Paris, taking on command of the 3rd Army Corps and of the 1st Military Region. In October 1980, he took over as director of personnel for the land army. He was made Army corps general in 1980, and promoted to general in March 1983. Later that year the Minister of Defence, Charles Hernu, appointed René Imbot Head of the Army ("Chef d'état-major de l'Armée de terre" / CEMAT). Together, Hernu and Imbot created the Rapid Action Force ("force d'action rapide " / FAR), designed for rapid intervention in Europe and overseas.

He was succeeded in 1985 by Maurice Schmitt. He was now appointed Overseas Intelligence ("Direction générale de la sécurité extérieure" / DGSE) by President Mitterrand. The appointment came amidst widesparead calls for reform of the service in the wake of the Rainbow Warrior affair which had triggered the resignation of his predecessor in the role, Pierre Lacoste. Imbot reorganised and modernised the DGSE, also reinstating the 11th Shock Parachute Regiment which had been dissolved back in 1963.

The Rainbow Warrior affair was viewed by the political establishment as a public relations disaster, likely to do long term political and indeed economic damage to the national interest. In this context, René Imbot accepted an invitation to appear on French television on 27 September 1985. In a memorably forceful presentation he stated his determination to "cut off the rotten branches" ("couper les branches pourries"), having identified "a truly malign conspiracy to destabilise the [intelligence] services" ("une véritable opération maligne de déstabilisation de nos services").

He retired from active service in 1988.

== Freemasonry ==
In 2003, Imbot was a co-founder, together with others leading establishment figures including François Thual and General Jeannou Lacaze, of the "Grand Lodge of Cutler and Spirituality" ("Grande Loge des cultures et de la spiritualité" / GLCS).
