= Pierre Marion =

Director of SDECE
- In office 17 June 1981 – 2 April 1982
- President: François Mitterrand
- Preceded by: Alexandre de Marenches

Director of DGSE
- In office 2 April 1982 – 10 November 1982
- Succeeded by: Pierre Lacoste

Personal details
- Born: 24 January 1921 Marseille, France
- Died: 17 May 2010 (aged 89) Louviers, France
- Spouse(s): Jane Marion; Michèle Menegay Marion; Colette Allègre
- Education: École Polytechnique

Pierre Marion (24 January 1921 – 17 May 2010) was a French senior official, who was the first director of the Directorate-General for External Security (DGSE – Direction Générale de la Sécurité Extérieure) from 1981 to 1982, and its predecessor, the Service de Documentation Extérieure et de Contre-Espionnage (SDECE).

Marion was born in Marseille, and entered the École Polytechnique at just 18 years of age. Following his education, he joined Air France where he held various management positions from 1956 to 1972. He then became managing director of aerospace manufacturer Aerospatiale's North American operations for ten years.

In 1981, Marion was asked by his friend, Charles Hernu (who had been made Minister of Defence in François Mitterrand's government), if he would become director of the SDECE, the French external intelligence agency. He agreed, and set about modernising the service, reducing its ties to the French military, and changing its name to DGSE. Marion clashed with Mitterrand over several issues, including the creation of an anti-terrorist cell operating from within the President's office, and in 1982 he was replaced by Admiral Pierre Lacoste.

Marion died in 2010 in Louviers.

Government offices
Preceded by Alexandre de Marenches	Director of the Service de Documentation Extérieure et de Contre-Espionnage/Directorate-General for External Security; 1981–1982	Succeeded by Pierre Lacoste
