= Ouvéa (ship) =

Yacht used in the bombing of Rainbow Warrior

Ouvéa, named after Ouvéa Island, was the name of a yacht used by three Directorate-General for External Security (DGSE) agents to import the naval mines used to sink the Greenpeace protest yacht Rainbow Warrior in 1985, killing photographer Fernando Pereira. The Ouvéa was sailed to Norfolk Island after the bombing. After New Zealand Police arrested two other agents still in New Zealand, the Ouvéa set to sea and was scuttled, while the crew transferred to the French submarine Rubis, to make their escape.

== See also ==
- Rainbow Warrior bombing
