= David Robie =

New Zealand journalist

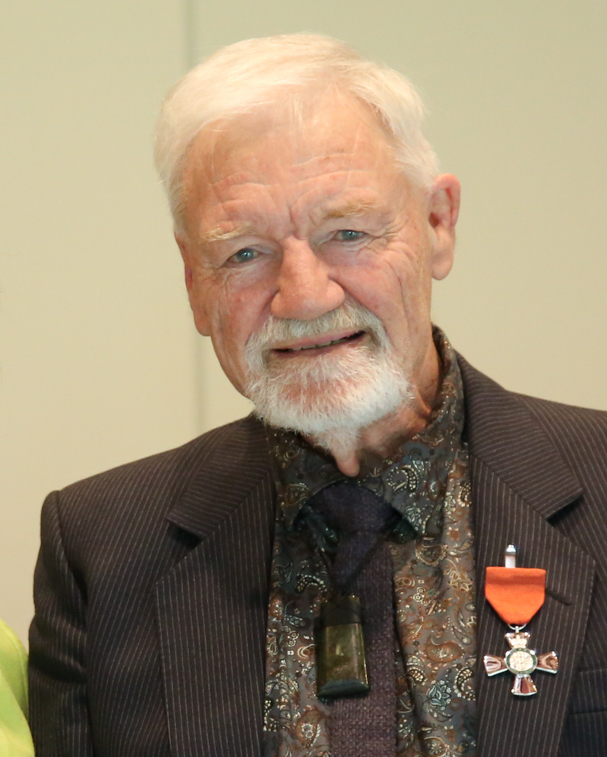
- Robie in 2025
- Born: 1945 (age 80–81); New Zealand
- Education: University of the South Pacific; University of Technology Sydney

David Telfer Robie MNZM (born 1945) is a New Zealand author, journalist and media educator who has covered the Asia-Pacific region for international media for more than four decades. Robie is the author of several books on South Pacific media and politics and is an advocate for media freedom in the pacific region.

In 1985, Robie sailed on board the Greenpeace eco-navy flagship Rainbow Warrior for 10 weeks until it was bombed by French secret agents in New Zealand’s Auckland harbour. He is the author of a book about the ill-fated voyage, Eyes of Fire: The Last Voyage of the Rainbow Warrior (Lindon Books, 1986). An updated memorial edition of Eyes of Fire was published in July 2005, and a 30th anniversary edition in July 2015 (Little Island Press).

In 1993-1997, Robie headed the University of Papua New Guinea journalism programme and in 1998-2002 became coordinator of the University of the South Pacific journalism school where his students covered the 2000 George Speight coup d'état in Fiji. According to the NZ Listener, an assistant minister in Fiji Prime Minister Sitiveni Rabuka's government in 1998 threatened to close Robie's media and politics website - Café Pacific - and revoke his work permit as a media educator in "what was seen as the first test of the 1997 Constitution's freedom of expression clause". In 1999, Robie became an annual Australian Press Council Fellow. He is founding editor of Pacific Journalism Review, launched at the University of Papua New Guinea in 1994. Between 1998-2002, Robie was the Head of Journalism at the University of the South Pacific. He became an associate professor in Auckland University of Technology School of Communication Studies in 2005 and a professor in 2011. In 2020 he retired as director of the Pacific Media Centre. In 2021, he co-founded the Asia Pacific Media Network and produced the independent Asia-Pacific news websites Asia Pacific Report and Café Pacific.

== Honours and awards ==
1985: NZ Media Prize, for coverage of the Rainbow Warrior bombing

1989: Qantas Press Awards for best feature article

2005: PIMA Pacific Media Freedom Award.

2015: AMIC Asia Communication Award.

In the 2024 King’s Birthday Honours, Robie was appointed a Member of the New Zealand Order of Merit, for services to journalism and Asia-Pacific media education.

== Publications ==
Robie's publications include:

- Robie, David (2025) Eyes of Fire: The Last Voyage of the Rainbow Warrior (40th anniversary edition) ISBN 9781877484513
- Robie, David (2015) Eyes of Fire: The Last Voyage of the Rainbow Warrior (30th anniversary edition) ISBN 9781877484285
- Robie, David (2014) Don't Spoil My Beautiful Face: Media, Mayhem and Human Rights in the Pacific ISBN 9781877484254
- Robie, David (2005) Eyes of Fire: The Last Voyage of the Rainbow Warrior (memorial edition) ISBN 9781877314469
- Robie, David (2004) Mekim Nius: South Pacific media, politics and education. ISBN 978-1-877314-30-8
- Robie, David (ed.) (2001) The Pacific Journalist: A Practical Guide ISBN 9820103851
- Robie, David (ed.) (1995) Nius Bilong Pasifik: Mass Media in the Pacific ISBN 9980840528
- Robie, David (ed.) (1992) Tu Galala: Social Change in the Pacific ISBN 0908912145
- Robie, David (1989) Och världen blundar... Kampen för frihet i Stilla Havet (translated into Swedish by Margareta Eklof, Sweden) ISBN 9170245274
- Robie, David (1989) Blood on their Banner: Nationalist Struggles in the South Pacific ISBN 0862328659
- Robie, David (1987) Eyes of Fire: The Last Voyage of the Rainbow Warrior (New Society Publishers edition, USA) ISBN 0865711143
- Robie, David (1986) Eyes of Fire: The Last Voyage of the Rainbow Warrior (Lindon, NZ)
