= Louis-Pierre Dillais =

French businessman

Louis-Pierre Dillais is a French businessman. He acknowledged his involvement with the sinking of the Rainbow Warrior in an interview with New Zealand State broadcaster TVNZ in 2005. Admiral Pierre Lacoste said in 2005 to the New Zealand Herald that Dillais was not part of the "third team".

== Life ==
According to Greenpeace, his father-in-law is former Foreign Minister Jean François-Poncet. In 1994, French Defence Minister François Léotard appointed Dillais as chief of the private office of the Minister of Defence, in charge of military intelligence. Dillais had already "worked for the general secretariat of the 'Defense National', attached to Prime Ministerial Services, in charge of European-Atlantic affairs".

A 1996 account in the Times of London, according to Harper's Magazine, links him to politics- and arms-related money laundering.

He was reported in 2007 as living in Virginia.

In 2012, De Standaard wrote that he is a former agent of the DGSE, while Greenpeace called him a terrorist. De Morgen reported that he was holding a top position in the FN Herstal U.S. operations unit since 2005.

Minister Jean-Claude Marcourt defended Dillais' position as an "internal decision by FN Herstal." and the Rainbow Warrior an "internal French" issue. In response to a parliamentary question by Bert Anciaux about Dillais, minister Joëlle Milquet says she will screen background check measures in a workgroup, aimed at more companies in more sectors.

In 2012, Greenpeace called for his deportation.
