= Xavier Maniguet =

French intelligence officer (1946–2009)

- Born: 17 October 1946; Arques-la-Bataille, France
- Died: 22 March 2009 (aged 62) near Saint-Sorlin-d'Arves, France
- Occupations: writer; doctor; intelligence agent
- Medical career
- Sub-specialties: aviation medicine; hyperbaric medicine; sports medicine

Xavier Maniguet (17 October 1946 – 22 March 2009) was a French medical writer, doctor and intelligence service (DGSE) agent.

Along with Roland Verge, Gerald Andries and Jean-Michel Barcelo, Maniguet bombed the Rainbow Warrior in New Zealand's Auckland Harbour on 10 July 1985.

A specialist in aviation medicine, hyperbaric medicine and sports medicine, he died on 23 March 2009 at the controls of a light plane on the glacier near St. Sorlin d'Arves, after taking off from the airfield in Meribel (France).

== Biography ==
A specialist in aviation and hyperbaric medicine and colonel in the French army,as well as an agent of the Directorate General for External Security, the French foreign intelligence service, Xavier Maniguet was involved in the Sinking of the Rainbow Warrior. He participated in Operation Satanic, which involved sinking the Greenpeace ship in Auckland Harbor, as skipper of the Ouvéa, a sailboat rented in New Caledonia that was carrying explosives and diving equipment. Its crew consisted of Roland Verge, Gérald Andries, and Jean-Michel Barcelo, all three non-commissioned officers at the Frogman swimmer training center in Aspretto, Corsica.

Criticized by some sections of the press, he denied in the weekly magazine Paris Match that he and his crew were directly involved in the operation and stated that the sailboat Ouvéa had left the port of Auckland the day before the Terrorism. He wrote the book French Bomber - Finally the Truth About the Rainbow Warrior Affair in 2007 to give his version of events.

Xavier Maniguet died on March 22, 2009, in a plane crash on the Saint-Sorlin-d'Arves near Saint-Sorlin-d'Arves, after taking off from the Méribel altiport (Savoie).

== Bibliography ==
- L'Aventure pour l'aventure, Carrère-Lafon, 1986
- Survivre, comment vaincre en milieu hostile, Albin Michel, 1988, (Survival, how to prevail in hostile environments, Facts On File Inc, 1994)
- Naufragés. Comment survivre en mer, Filipacchi, 1989
- Le Guide de l'homme d'action, Albin Michel, 1990
- Les Dents de la mort, Robert Laffont, J'ai Lu, 1991 (The Jaws of Death: Sharks As Predator, Man As Prey, HarperCollins, 1992)
- Les Énergies du stress, Robert Laffont, 1994
- La Montagne et vous, guide pratique, Albin Michel, 2000
- Mieux être. Vivre longtemps en pleine forme, sans gélules et sans stress, 2005
- French Bomber. Enfin la vérité sur le Rainbow Warrior, 2007
- Bien vivre avec son stress. Les bienfaits de la méthode Emostress, De Vecchi, 2009
