= Gérard Royal =

French spy

Gérard Royal is a former agent of the French intelligence agency Direction générale de la sécurité extérieure (DGSE-"General Directorate of External Security"), who is accused of being one of those responsible for the bombing of the Greenpeace ship Rainbow Warrior. A long serving officer, who retired from the French Army with the rank of colonel, Royal works in an "economic intelligence business". He is the brother of former French presidential candidate Ségolène Royal.

In 1985, Royal was a member of the DGSE implicated in the sinking of the Rainbow Warrior. Since 1995, it had been public knowledge that Royal was one of the team of saboteurs. In September 2006, as his sister Ségolène became a candidate for the presidency, Gérard returned to media attention when his brother Antoine told Le Parisien that he had admitted to being the man who planted the bombs which killed Fernando Pereira.

Le Parisien quoted Antoine as saying "...he was called upon in 1985 to go to New Zealand, to Auckland Harbour, to sabotage the Rainbow Warrior. Later, he told me that it was him who planted the bomb on the Greenpeace ship". Some French media, however, citing sources within the DGSE, have stated that Royal was merely the pilot of the inflatable boat carrying the bombers. Royal has refused to confirm or deny that he planted the bombs, but made a statement complaining of "harassment by the media".

Pereira's daughter and Greenpeace both called for the New Zealand government to demand the extradition of Royal to stand trial for the murder. But the government made it clear that they considered the case as closed.
