= Gilbert Chabroux =

French politician

Mayor of Villeurbanne
- In office 1990–2001
- Preceded by: Charles Hernu
- Succeeded by: Jean-Paul Bret

Member of the French Senate for Rhône
- In office 1995–2004

Personal details
- Born: 27 December 1933 Berneuil, France
- Died: 1 December 2017 (aged 83) Villeurbanne, France
- Party: Socialist Party

Gilbert Chabroux (27 December 1933 – 1 December 2017) was a French politician.

Chabroux was a native of Haute-Vienne, born on 27 December 1933. He attended the Ecole Normale d'Instructors in Limoges and later attended the École Normale Supérieure de l'Enseignement Technique. Chabroux then taught at the ENNA Lyon-Villeurbanne after deployment of 28 months during the Algerian War.

Chabroux became a member of the Young Socialist Movement in 1955, and joined the Villeurbanne chapter of the French Section of the Workers' International three years later. In 1965, he was elected to the Villeurbanne municipal council as an ally of mayor Étienne Gagnaire. Chabroux formally joined the Socialist Party in the 1970s. Chabroux was named deputy mayor under Charles Hernu in 1977, whom he succeeded as mayor in 1990, upon Hernu's death. His 1997 reelection to the mayoralty was legally challenged, and suspended for a year. Chabroux was eventually allowed to retain the office, until he stepped down in 2001 to focus on his role in the Senate in which he had been seated as a representative of Rhône in 1995. Chabroux left the Senate in 2004. He died in Villeurbanne on 1 December 2017, at the age of 83.
