= Peter Willcox =

American sea captain (born 1953)

Peter Henry Willcox
- Born: March 6, 1953 (age 73); Woodstock, Vermont
- Occupation: Activist

Peter Willcox (born March 6, 1953) is an American sea captain best known for his activism with the environmental organization Greenpeace. He was on board as captain of the Rainbow Warrior when it was bombed and sunk by the DGSE (French intelligence service) in New Zealand in 1985.

In 2013, he was aboard the MV Arctic Sunrise when the Russian military boarded it and arrested him and 30 other activists in what became known as the "Arctic 30." He was detained for two months before being released. In 2014, he received a Lifetime Achievement Award from The Guardian for his environmental activism.

== Early years ==
Willcox was born to Eleanor Sharpe of Woodstock, Vermont. Sharpe, a member of the U.S. Ski team at the time, was unmarried and gave the baby up for adoption at the urging of her family. Willcox was adopted by Roger and Elsie Willcox of South Norwalk, Connecticut. He was raised in Village Creek. Willcox's parents were both politically active. Roger, a community organizer specializing in co-ops, was a sailor. Elsie, who died in 1973, was a middle school science teacher in Norwalk and founded an environmental club in the late 1960s.

Both his mother and grandparents, Henry and Anita Willcox, were subpoenaed to testify before the House Un-American Activities Committee, and their careers were ruined as a result. Elsie, fearful that a subpoena would endanger her chances of adopting another child, took Peter and his brother Michael underground for three months in 1956. After the adoption papers were finalized, they returned to Norwalk, where she did receive a subpoena to testify.

Willcox was taken to many civil rights demonstrations as a child. These culminated in 1965, when Willcox and his father attended the last day of the Selma to Montgomery Civil Rights march. The event crystallized his view that non-violent demonstrations or actions can be useful tools for social change.

Willcox attended North Country School, and later The Putney School in Vermont.

== Clearwater ==
During his senior year at The Putney School, Willcox received the number one position in the 1972 draft lottery. He applied for and received conscientious objector status. Thanks to the work of Bill Siebert, the previous first mate, the Hudson River Sloop Clearwater was approved by a Federal Judge to be acceptable work for conscientious objectors. Although President Nixon declared the Vietnam War as over in February 1973, and the draft over, Willcox joined Clearwater. He spent the 1973 season as 2nd and 1st mate, and came back in 1976 as captain. While at Clearwater, Willcox met Pete and Toshi Seeger and saw them as inspirations for activism.

== Greenpeace ==
After spending a year doing humpback whale research on an old square rigger, Willcox saw an ad for mates and engineers on the newly arrived Greenpeace ship, the Rainbow Warrior. Given a spot as a possible deckhand, he was promoted to First Mate on his first day. Four months later, when the British captain left the ship to return to his family, he became the skipper. On July 10, 1985, as the Rainbow Warrior was at Auckland Harbour preparing to sail in protest French nuclear testing, it was bombed by French intelligence agents and sunk. The incident, which killed freelance photographer Fernando Pereira, caused an international scandal.

On September 19, 2013, he was arrested off Russian waters for participating in another Greenpeace campaign.

== Notable Greenpeace campaigns ==
1981
Offshore Oil drilling on Georges Bank.

1982:
Stopping National Lead Industries from dumping a million gallons of sulfuric acid off the New Jersey beaches every day.

Seal killing in Canada.

Dolphin killing as part of the tuna industry in the Pacific.

Whaling campaign in Peru.

1983

Seismic surveying off the coast of California.

Driftnet fishing in North Pacific.

Whaling by Russia in Bering Sea.

1985

Relocating the village of Rongalap in the Marshall Islands who were victims of the U.S. Atomic Testing program.

Rainbow Warrior was blown up in Auckland by French military personnel, killing shipmate Fernando Pereira.

Sailed on Vega IV to Mururoa atoll.

1987

Action with Danish Fisherman against Waste Management Services ship Vulcanos.

1988

Action on USN destroyer bring nuclear weapons into Denmark.

1989

First trip on board the second Rainbow Warrior.

Tasman Sea action against drift netters.

Scientific Testing at Mururoa.

1993

Exposed Russian dumping of nuclear waste in Sea of Japan.

1995

Sneak into Turkish power plant burning coal with banner.

2000

Return toxic waste to U.S. embassy in Manila.

2001

Soldertalje, Sweden action over burning toxic waste to generate electricity.

2003 (?)

Guns for Logs in Italy, France, Spain and Netherlands.

2007

Research trip to Bering Sea with two one-man submarines.

2009

Research trip to Greenland to document global warming.

2013

Captains the Arctic Sunrise in an action against Russia's oil drilling platform in international waters in the Arctic. He and the crew are arrested and held in prison for two months before being granted amnesty. Demonstrations were held all over the world urging Russian President Vladimir Putin to release the Arctic 30.

2016

Peter captains the second Rainbow Warrior near Fukushima, Japan to monitor radiation levels being released into the environment by the damaged nuclear reactors.

== Family life ==
Willcox was married in 1991, just in time for the birth of his first daughter, Anita. His second daughter, Natasha, was born in 1995. He was separated in 2002 and moved from Spain where he had been living back to Norwalk, Connecticut. His daughters joined him in 2004. In 2013, he married Maggy Aston, whom he had met on the Clearwater in the late 1970s, on Islesboro island in Maine, where he now lives. He has a step-son named Skylar Purdy. He has nine brothers and sisters, either adopted, biological or step.

== Sailing ==
Willcox grew up sailing. His father Roger was a multiple class national champion, who took his son big boat racing in the early 1960s. Roger continues to be a fair weather frostbite dingy sailor at age 94. Willcox raced for the America's Cup syndicate Freedom – Enterprise in 1979. He has done ten Bermuda Races, did eight S.O.R.C.s (Southern Ocean Racing Circuits) in the 1970s and is still active today. He currently races on a boat called Christopher Dragon out of New York.

He estimates he has sailed over 400,000 miles in his professional and recreational career.

He retired from Greenpeace in June 2019. He continues to race, ship out, and sail for a better planet.

== Writing ==
Willcox's memoir Greenpeace Captain: My Adventures in Protecting the Future of Our Planet was released on April 18, 2016, in the United States and Canada by St. Martin's Press. In Australia and New Zealand, the book was released by Random House Publishing.
