= Charles Hernu =

French politician (1923–1990)

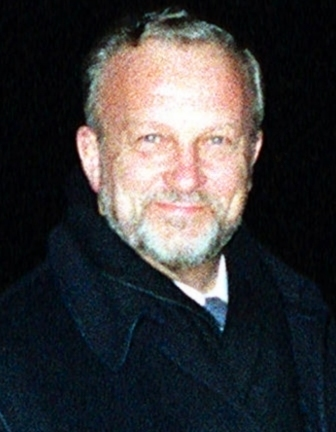
- Hernu in 1983

Minister of Defence
- In office 22 May 1981 – 20 September 1985
- Prime Minister: Pierre Mauroy; Laurent Fabius
- Preceded by: Robert Galley
- Succeeded by: Paul Quilès

Mayor of Villeurbanne
- In office 19 March 1977 – 17 January 1990
- Preceded by: Étienne Gagnaire
- Succeeded by: Gilbert Chabroux

Personal details
- Born: Eugène Charles Hernu; 3 July 1923 Quimper, France
- Died: 17 January 1990 (aged 66) Villeurbanne, France
- Party: Radical Party (1947–1962); Unified Socialist Party (1962–1964); Convention of Republican Institutions (1964–1971); Socialist Party (1971–1990)
- Education: Catholic University of Leuven

Eugène Charles Hernu (French pronunciation: [ʃaʁl ɛʁny]; 3 July 1923 – 17 January 1990) was a French Socialist politician. He served as Minister of Defence from 1981 to 1985, when he was forced to resign over the bombing of the Greenpeace ship Rainbow Warrior in New Zealand.

== Biography ==
Hernu was born in Quimper, Finistère, but received part of his higher education in Belgium. In 1946 he was a student at the Catholic University of Leuven in that country. There, he was one of the founders of a fraternity named Reuzegom. During this period he was known by the codename "Charles the invincible", which referred to his growing alcohol abuse habits and perseverance in seducing women. Also, in these days, Hernu developed his deep aversion toward environmental activists.

Hernu began his career working in the National Center of Foreign Trade (C.N.C.E.). In 1953, he created the "Club of the Jacobins", which ideologically was near to the radical (though non-communist) left, and which supported future Prime Minister Pierre Mendès France.

On 2 January 1956 (after Mendès France had lost the Prime Ministry but was still a powerful cabinet figure), Hernu was elected to the French legislature from the 6th sector of the Seine (Aubervilliers, Saint-Denis, Montreuil, Vincennes), on the Republican Front ticket. After the accession of Charles de Gaulle to the presidency, he lost his seat in Parliament.

In 1962, Hernu allied himself with the increasingly prominent Socialist Party figure François Mitterrand. During the 1970s, he became the Socialist Party's specialist on defence affairs, military and nuclear questions. In April 1974, he formed the "Coran", or convention of the reserve officers for the new army, which amalgamated with the Commission of the Defence of the PS. Three years later, he was elected mayor of Villeurbanne, which became an appointive position the following year (but which he continued to hold till his death).

Hernu was made Minister for Defence after the victory of Mitterrand in the presidential election of 1981. He held this position in the successive governments led by Prime Ministers Pierre Mauroy and Laurent Fabius.

== Rainbow Warrior bombing ==
On 10 July 1985, two bombs attached to the outside of the hull of the Greenpeace ship Rainbow Warrior while in the port of Auckland, New Zealand, exploded. The bombs were set by agents of the DGSE. This attack caused the death of Fernando Pereira, a Dutch photographer of Portuguese origins. Hernu had directed three teams of agents to neutralize the ship. A scandal erupted and led to Hernu's resignation two months later.

Hernu died in Villeurbanne, aged 66. After his death more reports emerged as to his political activities. In 1996, the magazine L'Express published articles claiming that, under the code names "André" and "Dinu", Hernu had been an agent of the Soviet Union.

In 2005, the newspaper Le Monde published extracts of a 1986 report by the former chief of the DGSE, Admiral Pierre Lacoste. According to the newspaper, Admiral Lacoste affirmed that the French spies who planted the bombs acted under the orders of Mitterrand himself (who had died nine years earlier).
