= Sinking of the Rainbow Warrior =

1985 covert attack by French foreign intelligence service on a Greenpeace ship

Sinking of Rainbow Warrior
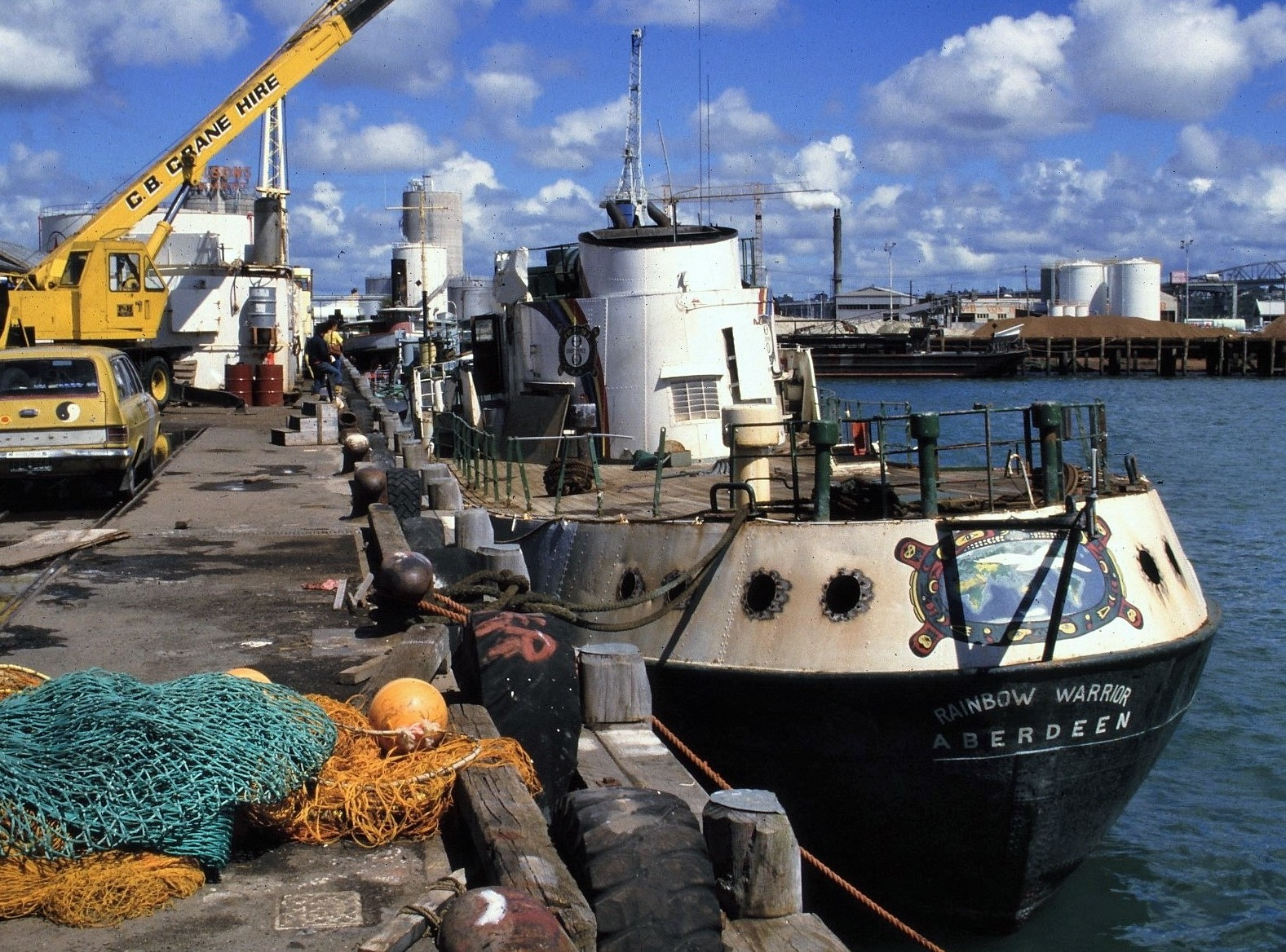
- Rainbow Warrior pictured in Auckland, 1985
- Date: 10 July 1985 (41 years ago); 11:38 p.m. – 11:45 p.m. (NZST; UTC+12:00)
- Location: Port of Auckland; Auckland, New Zealand; 36°50′32″S 174°46′18″E
- Caused by: Retaliation for protests by Greenpeace against French nuclear testing
- Goals: To sink Rainbow Warrior
- Methods: Bombing
- Result: Rainbow Warrior sunk, Fernando Pereira killed

Parties
France	Greenpeace	New Zealand

Lead figures
President François Mitterrand; Defence Minister Charles Hernu; DGSE (Action Division) (Note: Including: Pierre Lacoste; Dominique Prieur; Alain Mafart; Christine Cabon; Roland Verge; Jean-Michel Bartelo; Gérard Andries; Jean-Luc Kister; Jean Camas; Gérard Royal; Louis-Pierre Dillais)	Skipper Peter Willcox; First mate Martini Gotje	Prime Minister David Lange

Units involved
Ouvéa; Provence	Rainbow Warrior	New Zealand Police

Casualties and losses
None	1 killed	None

Casualties
- Arrested: 2 French agents arrested (later released)
- Detained: 3 French agents temporarily detained

The sinking of Rainbow Warrior, codenamed Opération Satanique, was an act of French state-terrorism carried out on 10 July 1985. The event was described by France as a "covert operation" by the "action" branch of the French foreign intelligence agency, the Directorate-General for External Security (DGSE). During the operation, two operatives (both French citizens) sank the flagship of the Greenpeace fleet, Rainbow Warrior, at the Port of Auckland on her way to a protest against a planned French nuclear test in Moruroa. Fernando Pereira, a photographer, drowned on the sinking ship.

The sinking was a cause of embarrassment to France and President François Mitterrand. They initially denied responsibility, but two French agents were captured by New Zealand Police and charged with arson, conspiracy to commit arson, willful damage and murder. It resulted in a scandal that led to the resignation of the French defence minister Charles Hernu, while the two agents pleaded guilty to manslaughter and were sentenced to ten years in New Zealand prison. Despite being sentenced to ten years' imprisonment, due to pressures from the French state they spent merely two years confined to the French Polynesian island of Hao before being freed by the French government.

France was also forced to apologise and had to pay reparations to New Zealand, Pereira's family and Greenpeace.

== Background ==
France began testing nuclear weapons in 1966 on Mururoa Atoll in the Tuamotu Archipelago of French Polynesia. In 1985, the South Pacific nations of Australia, the Cook Islands, Fiji, Kiribati, Nauru, New Zealand, Niue, Papua New Guinea, Samoa, Solomon Islands, Tonga, Tuvalu and Vanuatu signed the Treaty of Rarotonga declaring the region a nuclear-free zone.

Since being acquired by Greenpeace in 1977, Rainbow Warrior was active in supporting several anti-whaling, anti-seal hunting, anti-nuclear testing and anti-nuclear waste dumping campaigns during the late 1970s and early 1980s. Since early 1985, the ship was based in the southern Pacific Ocean, where its crew campaigned against nuclear testing. After relocating 300 Marshall Islanders from Rongelap Atoll, which had been polluted by radioactive fallout by past American nuclear tests, it travelled to New Zealand to lead a flotilla of yachts protesting French nuclear testing at the Mururoa Atoll.

During previous nuclear tests at Mururoa, protest ships had been boarded by French commandos after sailing into the shipping exclusion zone around the atoll. For the 1985 tests, Greenpeace intended to monitor the impact of nuclear tests and place protesters on the island to monitor the blasts.

French agents, posing as interested supporters or tourists, toured the ship while it was open to public viewing. DGSE agent Christine Cabon, who had previously worked on intelligence missions in the Middle East, posed as environmentalist "Frederique Bonlieu" to infiltrate the Greenpeace office in Auckland. While working for the Auckland office, Cabon secretly monitored communications from Rainbow Warrior, collected maps and investigated underwater equipment.

== Opération Satanique ==
Fernando Pereira, a photographer who was trapped and drowned in the sinking ship

Three agents on board the yacht Ouvéa imported the limpet mines used for the bombing. Two more agents, Dominique Prieur and Alain Mafart, posing as the newlywed couple "Sophie and Alain Turenge", picked up the mines and delivered them to the bombing team, consisting of the divers Jean Camas ("Jacques Camurier") and Jean-Luc Kister ("Alain Tonel").

After sufficient information had been gathered, Camas and Kister attached two limpet mines to Rainbow Warrior berthed at Marsden Wharf. They were detonated seven minutes apart. The first bomb went off at 23:38, blasting a hole about the size of an average car.

While the ship was initially evacuated, some of the crew returned to the ship to investigate and film the damage. Portuguese-Dutch photographer, Fernando Pereira, returned below deck to fetch his camera equipment. At 23:45, the second bomb went off. Pereira drowned in the rapid flooding that followed, and the other ten crew members either safely abandoned ship on the order of Captain Peter Willcox or were thrown into the water by the second explosion. Rainbow Warrior partially sank four minutes later.

== New Zealand reaction and investigation ==
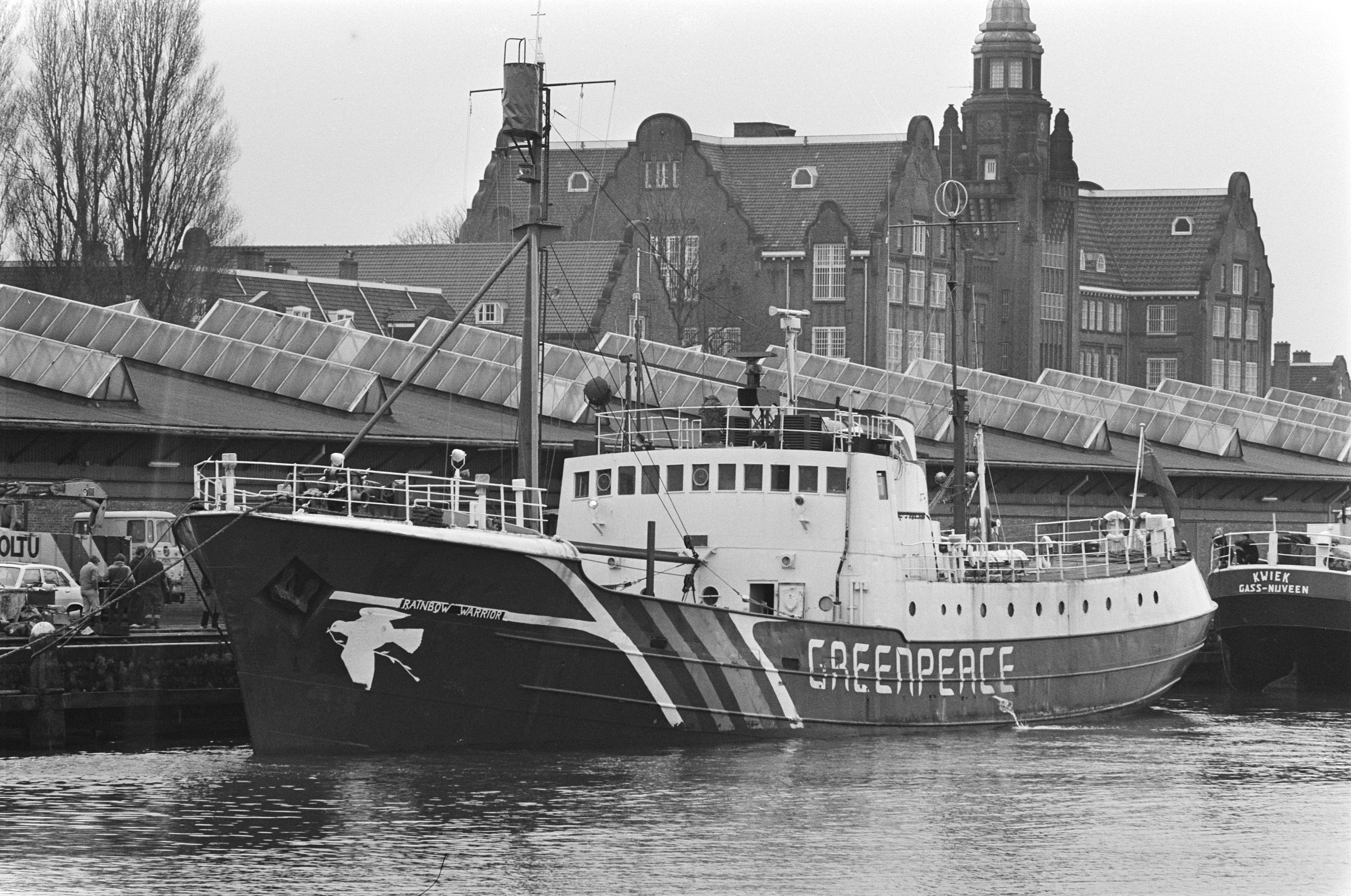
Rainbow Warrior in Amsterdam, 1981

After the bombing, the New Zealand Police started one of the country's largest police investigations. They identified two of the French agents, Captain Dominique Prieur and Commander Alain Mafart, as possible suspects. Prieur and Mafart were identified with the help of a Neighbourhood Watch group and arrested. Both were questioned and investigated. Because they were carrying Swiss passports, their true identities were discovered, along with the French government's responsibility.

The other agents of the French team all escaped from New Zealand. Christine Cabon, whose role had ended before the bombing, had left for Israel immediately before the sinking. After she was identified as a participant in the operation, Auckland police requested that the Israeli authorities detain her. Cabon was tipped off and fled before she could be arrested.

Three other agents, Chief Petty Officer Roland Verge ("Raymond Velche"), Petty Officer Jean-Michel Bartelo ("Jean-Michel Berthelo") and Petty Officer Gérard Andries ("Eric Audrenc"), who had carried the bombs to New Zealand on the yacht Ouvéa, escaped by that yacht and were arrested by Australian police on Norfolk Island. New Zealand sent a team of detectives and a forensic scientist to Norfolk Island to interview the suspects and collect evidence. They required time to analyse the evidence before making arrests. The Australian authorities gave the New Zealand team a day to make a decision, after which the suspects were released. They were then picked up by the French nuclear submarine Rubis, after they scuttled Ouvéa. New Zealand issued arrest warrants for the Ouvéa crew on 26 July on charges of arson and murder, by which time the crew had left Australian jurisdiction.

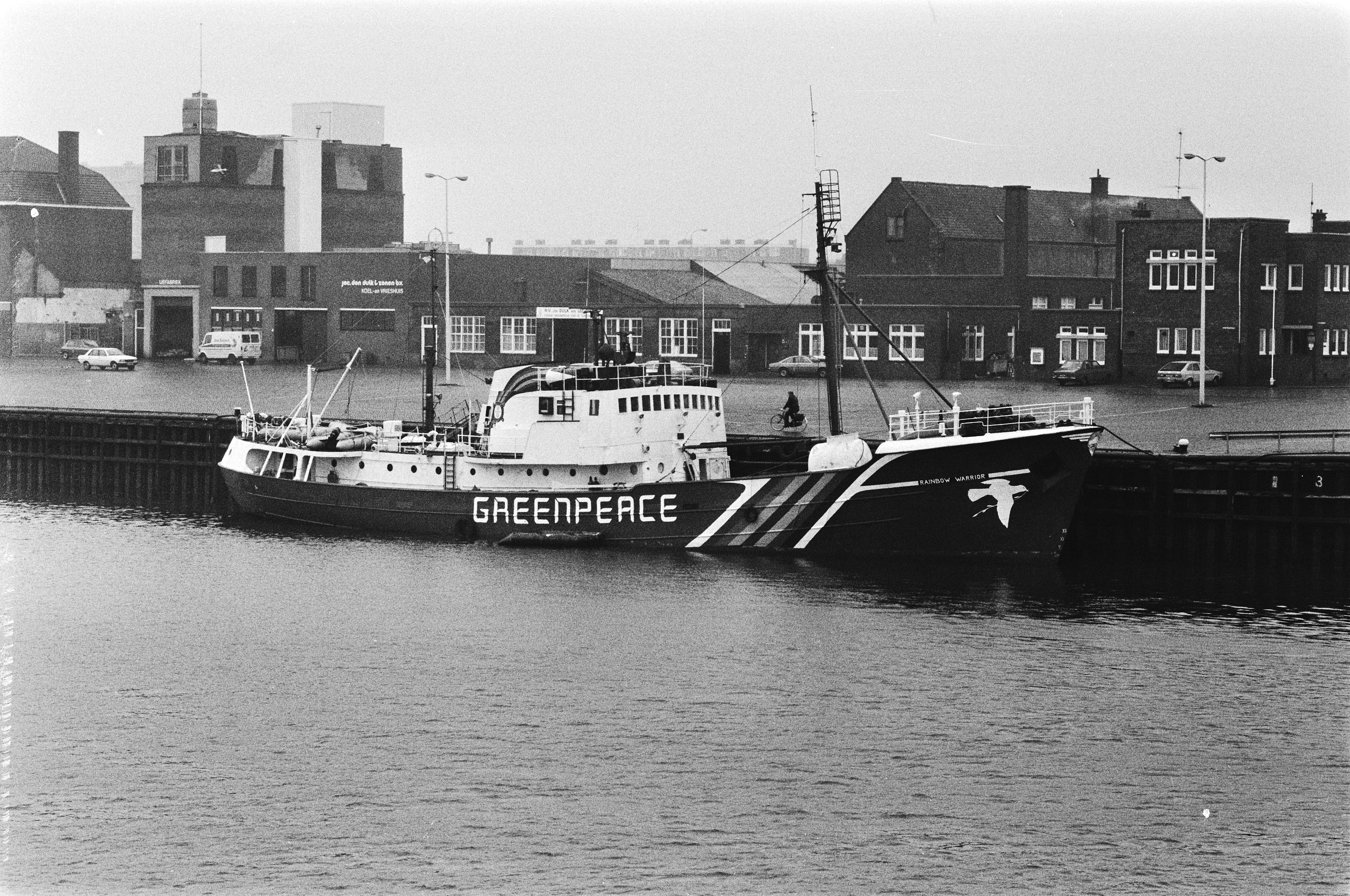
Rainbow Warrior pictured in Scheveningen, 1979

Several agents, including Jean-Luc Kister, one of the bombers, had posed as tourists. They took a ferry to the South Island, went skiing at Mount Hutt, and then left the country using false documents about ten days later. Another agent, Louis-Pierre Dillais, possibly the commander of the operation, was also never captured.

== France implicated ==
France, being an ally of New Zealand, initially denied involvement and joined in condemning what it described as a terrorist act. The French embassy in Wellington denied involvement, stating that "the French Government does not deal with its opponents in such ways".

Once it was realised that the bombing was the action of the government of a friendly state, the New Zealand government stopped referring to it as a "terrorist act", instead calling it "a criminal attack in breach of the international law of state responsibility, committed on New Zealand sovereign territory". The "breach of international law" aspect was referred to in all communications with the United Nations to dissuade any arguments from the French government that might imply justification for their act.

Prieur and Mafart pleaded guilty to manslaughter and were sentenced to ten years' imprisonment on 22 November 1985. France threatened an economic embargo of New Zealand's exports to the European Economic Community if the pair were not released. Such an action would have crippled the New Zealand economy, which was dependent on agricultural exports to the United Kingdom.

France launched their own commission of enquiry headed by Bernard Tricot which declared the French government innocent of any involvement in the operation, claiming that the arrested agents, who had not yet pleaded guilty, had merely been spying on Greenpeace. When The Times and Le Monde contradicted these findings by claiming that President Mitterrand had approved the bombing, Defence Minister Charles Hernu resigned and the head of the DGSE, Admiral Pierre Lacoste, was fired.

Operation Satanic was a public relations disaster. Eventually Prime Minister Laurent Fabius admitted the bombing had been a French plot. On 22 September 1985, he summoned journalists to his office to read a 200-word statement in which he said: "The truth is cruel," and acknowledged there had been a cover-up. He went on to say that "Agents of the French secret service sank this boat. They were acting on orders."

== Aftermath ==
Several figures, including then New Zealand Prime Minister David Lange, have referred to the bombing as an act of terrorism or state-sponsored terrorism, with scholars since describing the attack as an act of state terrorism.

=== Nuclear testing ===
The next nuclear test Héro was conducted at Mururoa on 24 October 1985 with a yield of two kilotonnes of TNT (8.4 TJ). France conducted 54 more nuclear tests until the end of nuclear testing in 1996.

=== Greenpeace and Rainbow Warrior ===
A Greenpeace Rainbow Warrior benefit concert at Mount Smart Stadium, Auckland, on 5 April 1986 included performances by Herbs, Neil Young, Jackson Browne, Graham Nash, Topp Twins, Dave Dobbyn and a Split Enz reunion.

Rainbow Warrior was refloated for forensic examination. She was deemed irreparable and scuttled in Matauri Bay, near the Cavalli Islands on 12 December 1987, to serve as a dive wreck and fish sanctuary. Her masts had been removed and put on display at the Dargaville Maritime Museum. Greenpeace acquired a new ship and gave it the name Rainbow Warrior earlier that same year. On 14 October 2011, Greenpeace launched a new sailing vessel, again called Rainbow Warrior, which is equipped with an auxiliary electric motor. The ships are informally known as Rainbow Warrior II and Rainbow Warrior III, respectively.

=== Reparations ===
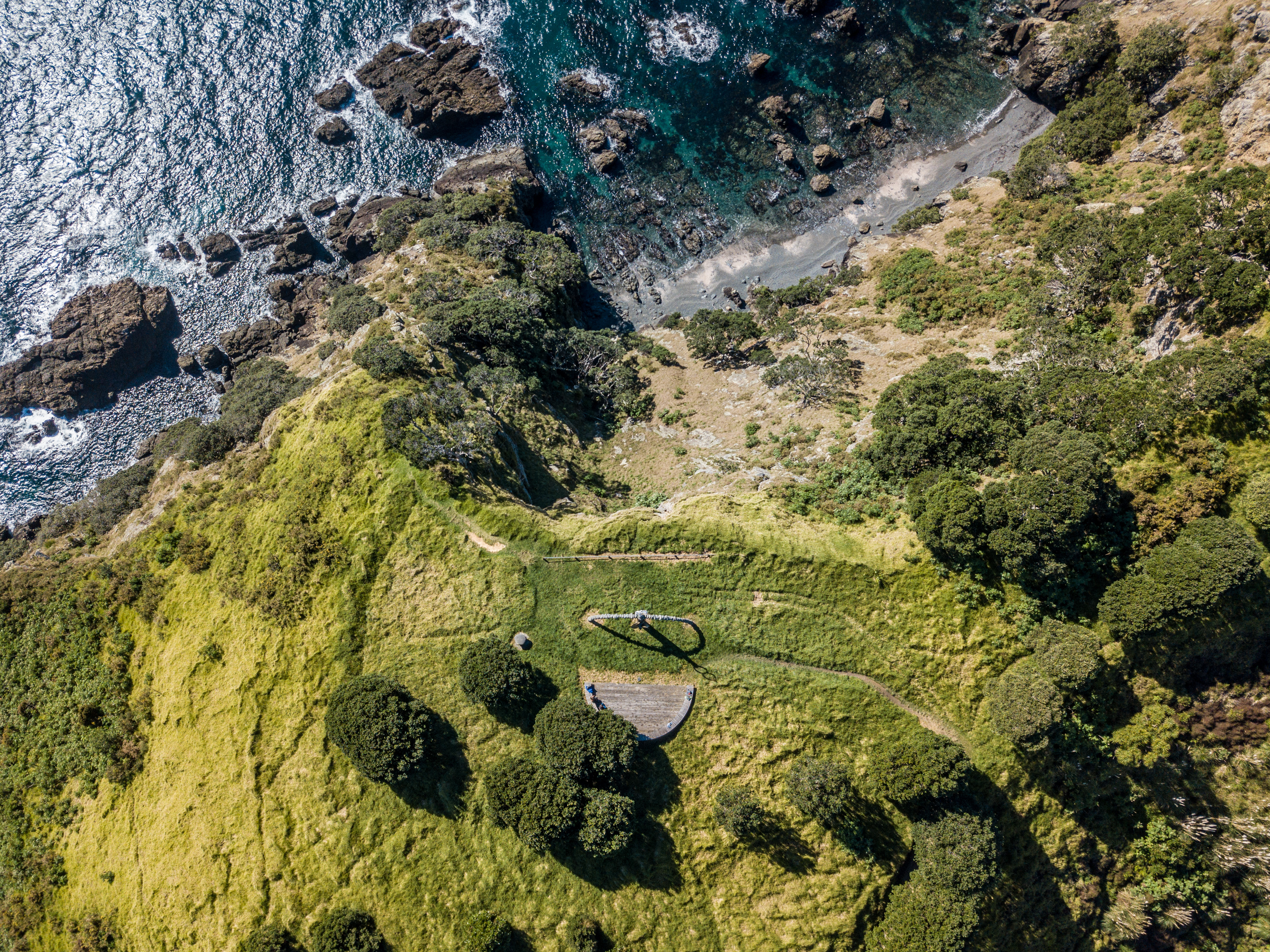
The Rainbow Warrior Memorial from above

In 1987, after international pressure, France paid $8.16m to Greenpeace in damages, which helped finance another ship. It also paid compensation to the Pereira family, reimbursing his life insurance company for 30,000 Dutch guilders and making reparation payments of 650,000 francs to Pereira's wife, 1.5 million francs to his two children, and 75,000 francs to each of his parents.

=== Foreign relations ===
The failure of Western leaders to condemn a violation of a friendly nation's sovereignty caused a great deal of change in New Zealand's foreign and defence policy. New Zealand distanced itself from the United States, a traditional ally, and built relationships with small South Pacific nations, while retaining excellent relations with Australia and, to a lesser extent, the United Kingdom.

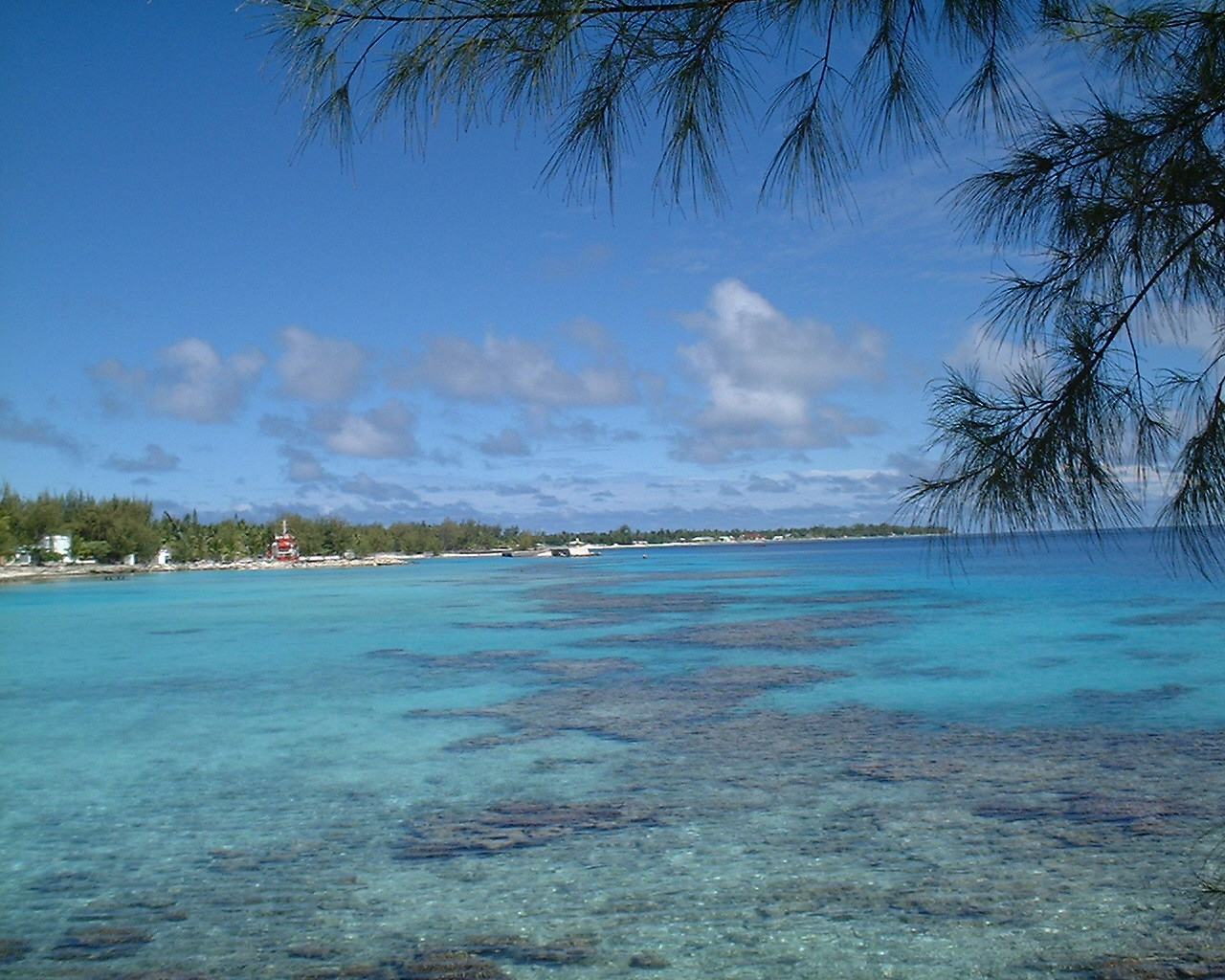
Hao atoll

In June 1986, in a political deal with New Zealand Prime Minister David Lange, presided over by United Nations Secretary-General Javier Pérez de Cuéllar, France agreed to pay NZ$13 million (US$6.5 million) to New Zealand and apologise, in return for which Alain Mafart and Dominique Prieur would be detained at the French military base on Hao Atoll for three years. However, the two agents had both returned to France by May 1988, after less than two years on the atoll. Mafart returned to Paris on 14 December 1987 for medical treatment and was apparently freed after the treatment. He continued in the French Army and was promoted to colonel in 1993. Prieur returned to France on 6 May 1988 because she was pregnant, her husband having been allowed to join her on the atoll. She, too, was freed and later promoted. The removal of the agents from Hao without subsequent return was ruled to be in violation of the 1986 agreement.

Following the breach of the arrangement, in 1990 the UN secretary-general awarded New Zealand another NZ$3.5 million (US$2 million) to establish the New Zealand / France Friendship Fund. Although France had formally apologised to the New Zealand Government in 1986, during a visit in April 1991, French Prime Minister Michel Rocard delivered a personal apology. He said it was "to turn the page in the relationship and to say, if we had known each other better, this thing never would have happened". The Friendship Fund has provided contributions to a number of charity and public purposes. During a visit in 2016, French Prime Minister Manuel Valls reiterated that the incident had been "a serious error".

=== Further investigations ===
In 2005, French newspaper Le Monde released a report from 1986, which said that Admiral Pierre Lacoste, head of DGSE at the time, had "personally obtained approval to sink the ship from the late president François Mitterrand." Soon after the publication, former Admiral Lacoste came forward and gave newspaper interviews about the situation, admitting that the death weighed on his conscience and saying that the aim of the operation had not been to kill. He acknowledged the existence of three teams: the yacht crew, reconnaissance and logistics (those successfully prosecuted), plus a two-man team that carried out the bombing.

A 20th anniversary memorial edition of the 1986 book Eyes of Fire: The Last Voyage of the Rainbow Warrior by New Zealand author David Robie—who was aboard the bombed ship—was published in July 2005.

=== French agents ===
Twenty years after the bombing, Television New Zealand (TVNZ) sought access to a video record made at the preliminary hearing in which the two French agents pleaded guilty. The footage had remained sealed since shortly after the conclusion of the criminal proceedings. The two agents opposed release of the footage and unsuccessfully took the case to the New Zealand Court of Appeal and, subsequently, the Supreme Court of New Zealand. On 7 August 2006, Justices Hammond, O'Regan and Arnold dismissed the former French agents' appeal and TVNZ broadcast their guilty pleas the same day.

In 2005, in an interview with TVNZ, Louis-Pierre Dillais acknowledged his involvement with the bombing.

In 2006, Antoine Royal revealed that his brother, Gérard Royal, had claimed to be involved in planting the bomb. Their sister is French Socialist Party politician Ségolène Royal, who was contesting the French presidential election. Other sources identified Royal as the pilot of the Zodiac inflatable boat that carried the bombers. The New Zealand government announced there would be no extradition request since the case was closed.

In 2007, the New Zealand Green Party criticised the government over its purchase of arms from Belgian arms manufacturer FN Herstal, whose U.S. subsidiary was led by Dillais. At that time, Greenpeace was still pursuing the extradition of Dillais for his involvement in the act.

In September 2015, TVNZ's Sunday programme tracked down Jean Luc Kister, one of the two bombers. Kister, who retired from the DGSE in about 2000, admitted his lead role and feelings of responsibility for the lethal attack. He also pointed to the French president, as commander of the armed forces and intelligence services assigned the operation. Reporter John Hudson, who spent two days with Kister in France, said that Kister "wanted an opportunity to talk about his role in the bombing... It has been on his conscience for 30 years. He said to us, 'secret agents don't talk', but he is talking. I think he wanted to be understood." Kister considered the mission "a big, big failure".

== Rainbow Warrior memorial ==
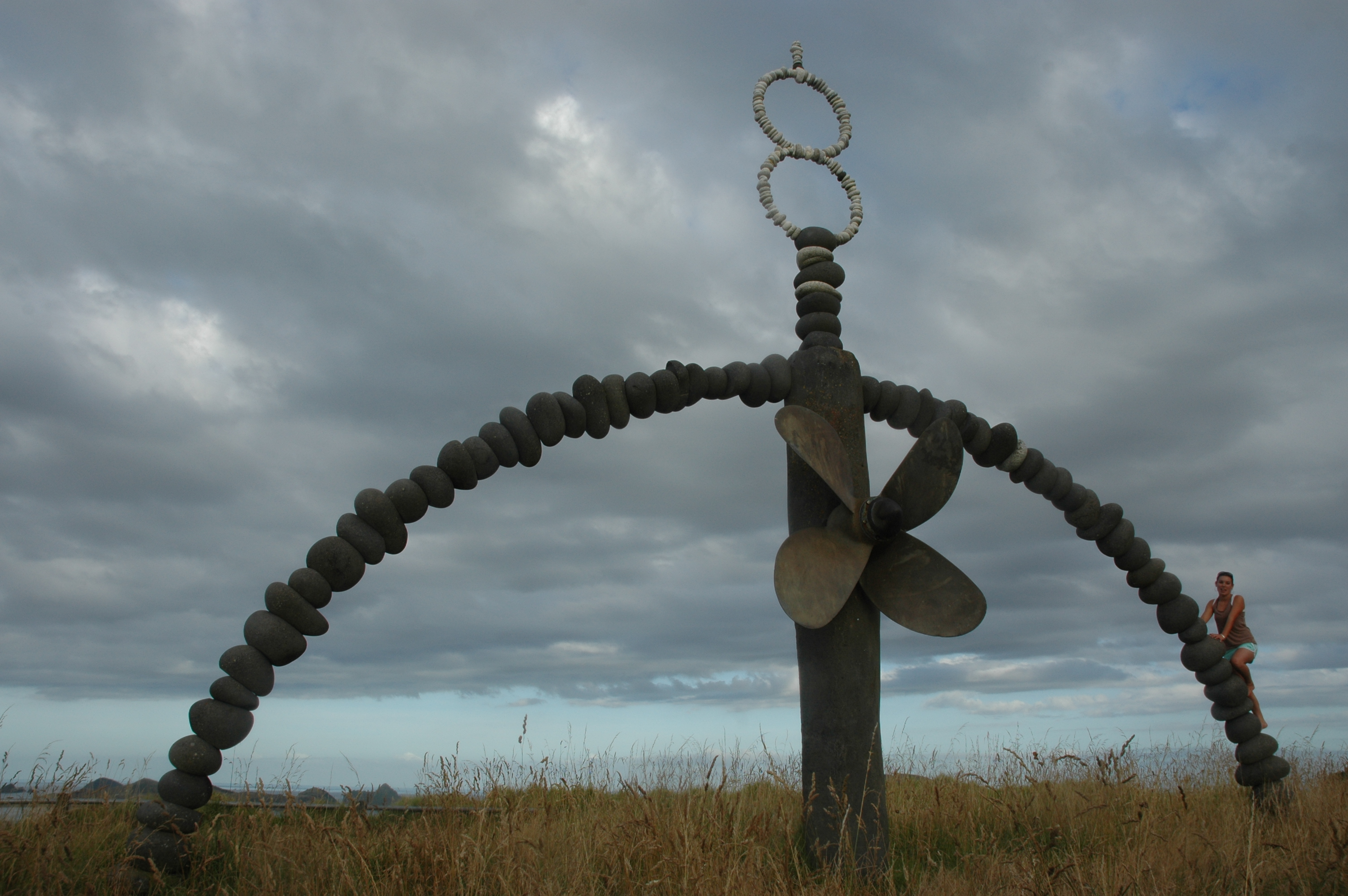
The Rainbow Warrior Memorial in Matauri Bay

Built between 1988 and 1990, a memorial for the Rainbow Warrior was created by New Zealand sculptor Chris Booth. The memorial was erected in Matauri Bay in Northland, New Zealand. It was commissioned by Ngati Kura and New Zealand China Clays.

== In popular culture ==
The sinking, and subsequent investigation, was the subject of several films, including The Rainbow Warrior Conspiracy (1988), The Rainbow Warrior (1993) and Claudia Pond-Eyley's Departure and Return: The Final Journey of the Rainbow Warrior (2006).

Murder in the Pacific is a three-part documentary about the sinking, directed by Chloe Campbell. It was broadcast on BBC2 in March 2023.

The 1985 song "Hercules" by the Australian band Midnight Oil is about the sinking. In 1990 New Zealand singer/songwriter Martin Curtis recorded and released "The End of the Rainbow", on the album The Daisy Patch. The 1989 song "Little Fighter", by the Danish/American band White Lion, is about the sinking. It is also referenced in the 2004 song "Walkampf" by German punk band Die Toten Hosen. In 2005, a supergroup of New Zealand musicians and artists recorded a cover of Anchor Me, by the New Zealand rock band The Mutton Birds, to commemorate the 20th anniversary of the bombing. The song peaked at No. 3 in the New Zealand singles chart.

== See also ==
- Foreign espionage in New Zealand – Espionage activities in New Zealand by foreign entities
- Terrorism in New Zealand
- Legend of the Rainbow Warriors – Story from a 1962 religious tract
- New Zealand nuclear-free zone – Legal prohibition on nuclear energy or weapons within New Zealand
- Rainbow Warrior Case – 1986 dispute between New Zealand and France
- The Rainbow Warrior Conspiracy – 1988 Australian–New Zealand mini-series (1988)
- The Rainbow Warrior (film) – 1993 film by Michael Tuchner
- Xavier Maniguet – French intelligence officer (1946–2009)
