= Dominique Prieur =

French spy (born 1949)

Dominique Prieur (born 1949) is a French military officer who was convicted of manslaughter over her part in the sinking of the Rainbow Warrior.

== Biography ==
Prieur joined the military in 1974 and was recruited as a secret agent in August 1977.

=== Sinking of the Rainbow Warrior ===
Prieur worked in the intelligence-gathering and evaluation wing of the French Secret Service, the Direction Générale de la Sécurité Extérieure (DGSE). She was an expert in European peace organisations and was the controller for Christine Cabon. Cabon was posted to Auckland in April 1985, where she infiltrated the Greenpeace office and gathered information for Prieur and her fellow agent Alain Mafart. In July 1985, Prieur and Mafart entered New Zealand from Corsica on Swiss passports issued to their aliases Sophie and Alain Turenge, a newlywed couple on honeymoon. Their instructions were to sink the Rainbow Warrior as the French government suspected that it would be used to protest the upcoming nuclear tests at Mururoa atoll in the South Pacific. Prieur's responsibilities were the logistics of the operation, and the evacuation of the agents from the country after the bombing had taken place.

Prieur and Mafart delivered limpet mines to two frogmen to plant on the ship's hull on the night of 10 July 1985. The explosions sank the vessel and killed photographer Fernando Pereira.

They were arrested by New Zealand police within 30 hours of the bombing, and originally charged with Pereira's murder. Prieur was transferred to Christchurch Women's Prison and held there awaiting trial. Prieur pleaded guilty to charges of manslaughter and wilful damage in the Auckland District Court, and was sentenced to ten years imprisonment on 22 November 1985. After serious political pressure from France and her allies, the New Zealand government agreed to a United Nations arbitration ruling in July 1986 that saw the pair transferred to French custody on the island of Hao in French Polynesia.

Prieur's husband, Joel Prieur, an employee of the Defense Department, was posted to Hao shortly after she was exiled there. On 6 May 1988 she was returned to France because she was pregnant, and was heralded as a national hero. She never returned to Hao.

Although a UN Arbitration panel found that France had breached its obligation to New Zealand several times by removing the agents from Hao, and failing to return them, it rejected the claim by New Zealand to have Mafart and Prieur returned because the term they should have spent there had already lapsed.

=== Later career ===
In 1989, Prieur was promoted to Major, and by 2002 she had been promoted to the rank of Commandant.

Prieur published a book "Agent secrète" (Secret Agent) in 1995 concerning her role in the bombing. With regards to the death of Pereira, she wrote "We were terrified and appalled ... We hadn't come here to kill anyone."

In 2005, Prieur and Marfart appealed to the New Zealand Supreme Court to stop footage of their guilty pleas being shown on television. The supreme court allowed the footage to go on the air.

In 2009, Prieur was hired as the director of human resources for the Paris Fire Brigade, a unit of the French Army.
