= Alain Mafart =

French military officer convicted for his part in the bombing of the Rainbow Warrior

- Born: 1951 (age 74–75)
- Military career
- Allegiance: France
- Branch: Navy
- Rank: Colonel
- Unit: DGSE
- Other work: Photographer

Alain Mafart (born 1951) is a French military officer best known for his part in the bombing of the Rainbow Warrior.

Mafart was a DGSE agent and deputy commander of the DGSE Training Centre in Corsica. He supported the sabotage team that travelled to New Zealand and bombed and sank the Greenpeace vessel Rainbow Warrior, drowning photographer Fernando Pereira.

He was apprehended by New Zealand police together with a fellow agent Dominique Prieur, both pleaded guilty to manslaughter and were sentenced to 10 years imprisonment on 22 November 1985. Following heavy political pressure from France and her allies and a United Nations-sponsored mediation between New Zealand and France in July 1986, Mafart was deported to the island of Hao in French Polynesia, France to serve three years. In return, France apologised to New Zealand and paid New Zealand $6.5 million.

However, on 14 December 1987, Mafart was returned to Paris after complaining of stomach pains. After treatment he was not returned to the island and in 1988 enrolled on a two-year course at the École de Guerre (War College) in Paris.

Mafart was promoted to colonel in December 1993. According to Le Monde, Mafart was then serving near Paris on a base housing several command staffs, including that of military intelligence.

His commanding officer during the Rainbow Warrior affair became an aide to Defence Minister Francois Léotard.

He wrote a book "Carnets secrets d'un nageur de combat: Du Rainbow Warrior aux glaces de l'Arctique" (Secret notebooks of a combat swimmer": from the Rainbow Warrior to the Arctic ices) that concerned his role in the bombing. ^{paragraphs 1-7}

Mafart subsequently become a photographer, and in 2016 was a finalist in the Natural History Museum's Wildlife Photographer of the Year award. In 2014, under the name Alain Mafart-Renodier, one of his photos was selected for inclusion in an international Greenpeace calendar. Upon belatedly realising the identity of the photographer, Greenpeace USA destroyed 14,000 calendars it held in stock but could not prevent the majority from being sold to the public.
