= Pierre Lacoste =

French soldier (1924–2020)

- Born: 23 January 1924; Paris, France
- Died: 13 January 2020 (aged 95); Paris, France
- Military career
- Allegiance: France
- Branch: French Navy
- Rank: Admiral

Pierre Lacoste (French pronunciation: [pjɛʁ lakɔst]; 23 January 1924 – 13 January 2020) was a French marine officer and government official. He served as President of the Fédération des professionnels de l'intelligence économique in 2006.

== Biography ==
During World War II, Lacoste escaped German occupation and joined the Free French Forces in North Africa. He completed his education at the École Navale in 1946.

In 1975, Lacoste was appointed as Assistant Minister of Defense, with Yvon Bourges at the helm. The following year, he led the École supérieure de guerre navale. In 1978, he headed the military office of Prime Minister Raymond Barre. In 1980, Lacoste commanded the Mediterranean Squadron.

In 1982, Pierre Marion was dismissed as Director General of External Security by François Mitterrand. Lacoste took his place. He held this position from 12 November 1982 to 19 September 1985.

In 1985, Lacoste commanded the sinking of the Rainbow Warrior in New Zealand. Following this incident, Lacoste was dismissed as Director General. He was succeeded by René Imbot.

In 2005, Le Monde published a report on the Rainbow Warrior intended for the Minister of Defense André Giraud in which Lacoste recalls President Mitterrand giving the green light for the sinking.

From 1986 to 1989, Lacoste presided over the Fondation des études de défense nationale. In 1989, he became President of the Défense - Armée - Nation Liaison of the Centre d'information civique. In 1993, he co-chaired the Centre d'études scientifiques de défense at the University of Paris-Est Marne-la-Vallée where he taught a seminar on "French intelligence culture." He also created the lesson "Strategic Intelligence, Risk Analysis, Territories", which still exists today.

== Awards ==
- Grand Officer of the Legion of Honour
- Grand-Cross of the Ordre national du Mérite

== Publications ==
- Stratégies navales du présent (1986)
- Les mafias contre la démocratie (1992)
- Un amiral au secret (1997)
- Approches françaises du renseignement (1997)
- Le renseignement à la française (1998)
- Services secrets et géopolitique (2001)
- Défense nationale et sécurité collective, actualisation et renouvellement de la pensée stratégique (2006)
