= Fernando Pereira =

Portuguese-Dutch photographer (1950–1985)

- Pereira in 1984, during Operation Exodus
- Born: 10 May 1950; Chaves, Portugal
- Died: 10 July 1985 (aged 35); Auckland, New Zealand
- Occupation: Photographer

Fernando Pereira (10 May 1950 – 10 July 1985) was a Portuguese-Dutch freelance photographer, who drowned when French intelligence (DGSE) detonated a bomb and sank the Rainbow Warrior, owned by the environmental organisation Greenpeace on 10 July 1985.

The bombing of the boat had been designed to make the ship unsalvageable. The first smaller bomb bent the propeller shaft, making repair uneconomic. Pereira stayed inside the boat to get his camera and other pieces of equipment. The second, more powerful explosion, designed to sink the boat, caused a huge inrush of seawater that drowned Pereira.

The Rainbow Warrior led a flotilla of yachts protesting against French nuclear testing at Mururoa Atoll in the Tuamotu Archipelago of French Polynesia and was about to depart Auckland for a campaign of legal demonstrations in international waters near the French military operational areas at Moruroa Atoll.

== Subsequent updates ==
On the twentieth anniversary of the sinking, it was revealed that the French president François Mitterrand had personally authorized the bombing. Admiral Pierre Lacoste made a statement saying Pereira's death weighed heavily on his conscience. Also on that anniversary, Television New Zealand sought to access a video record made at the preliminary hearing where the two agents pleaded guilty. The footage has remained sealed on the court record since shortly after the conclusion of the criminal proceedings. The two agents oppose release of the footage and have taken the case to the New Zealand Court of Appeal and, subsequently, the Supreme Court of New Zealand.

In 2006, Antoine Royal, brother of the French presidential candidate Ségolène Royal, revealed in an interview that their brother, Gérard Royal, a former French intelligence officer, had been the agent who put the bombs on the Rainbow Warrior.

== Photographs by Pereira ==
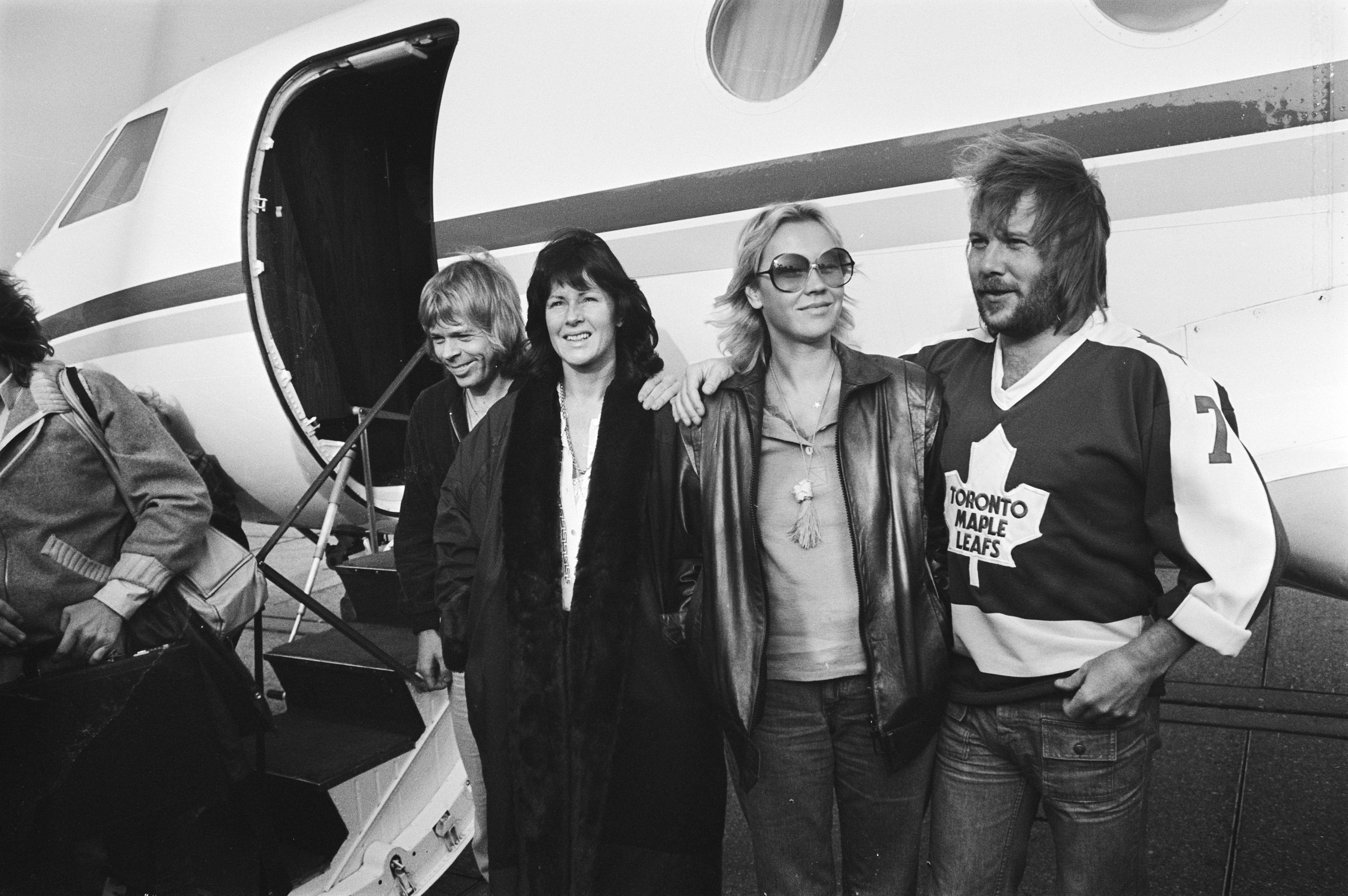
ABBA (1979)

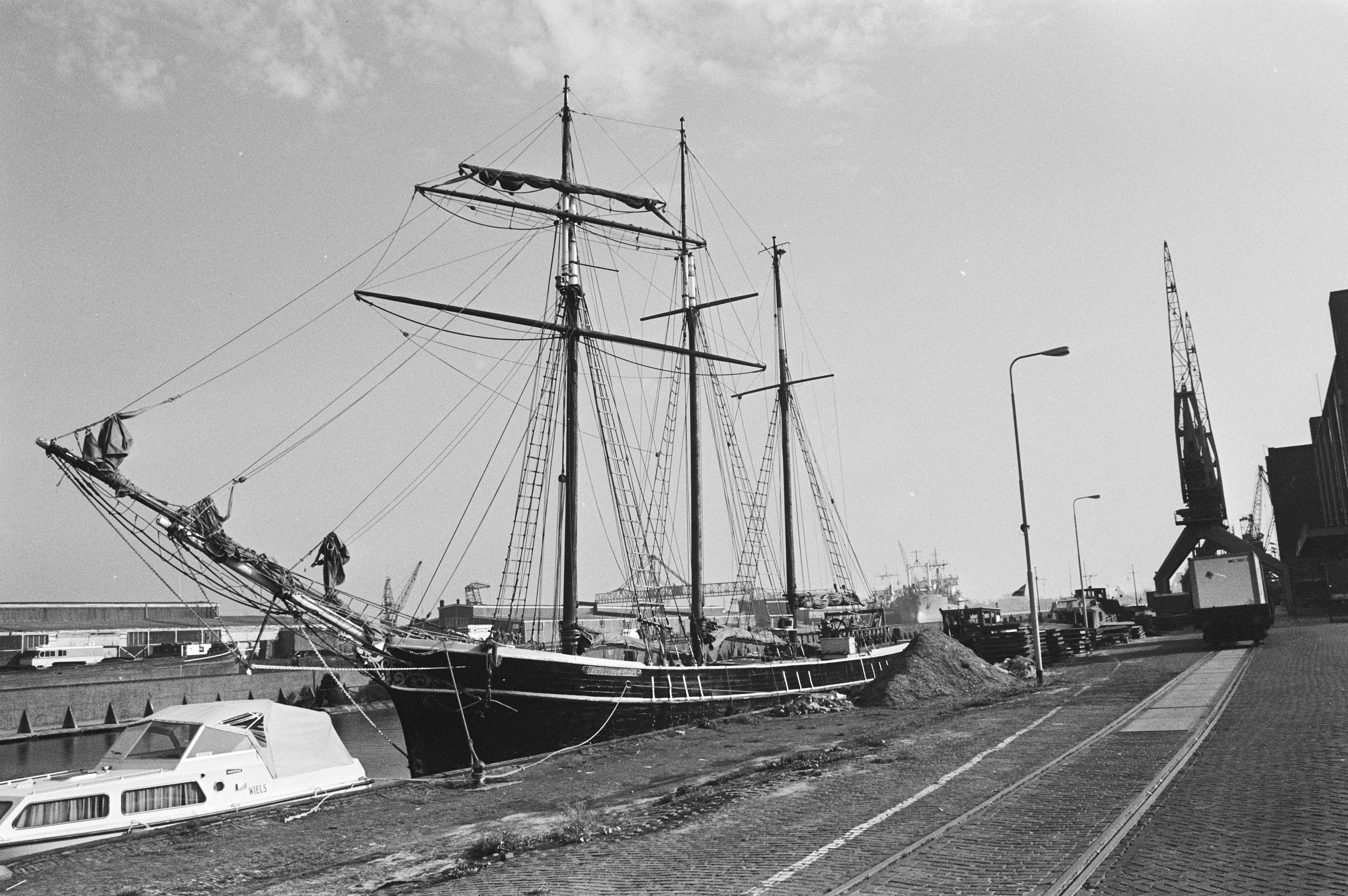
Charlotte Rhodes (1979)

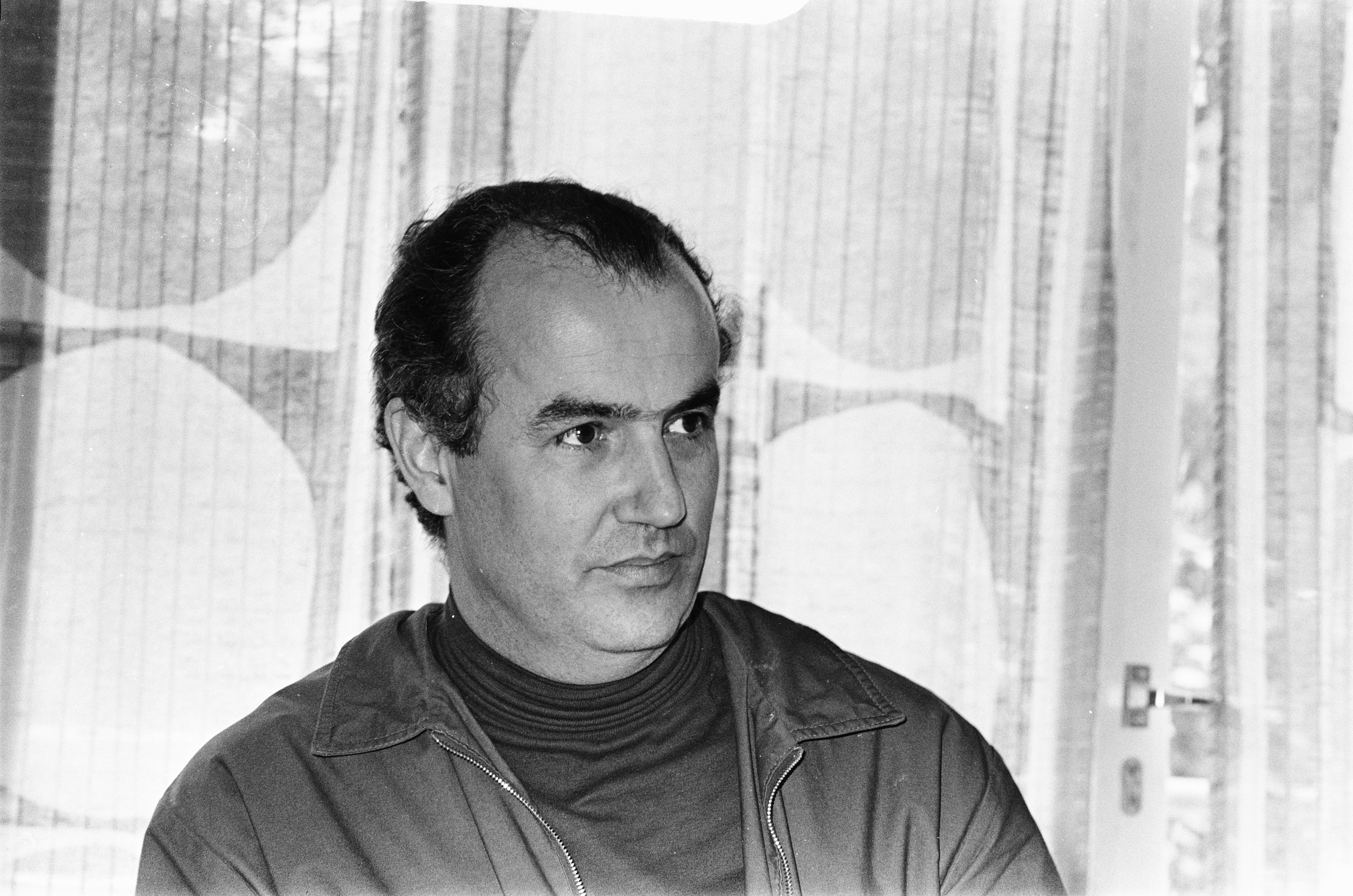
Luigi Nono (1979)

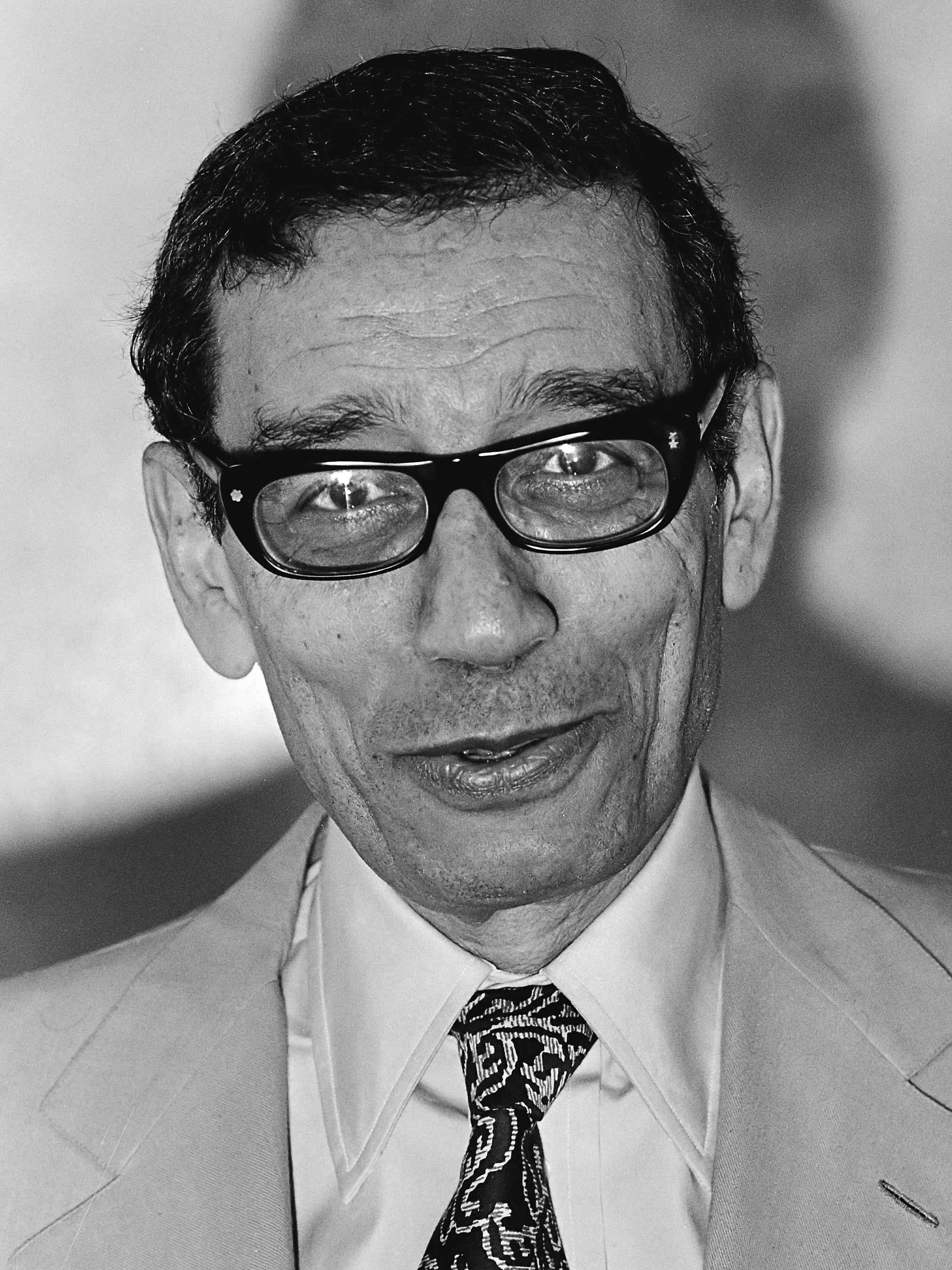
Boutros Boutros-Ghali (1980)

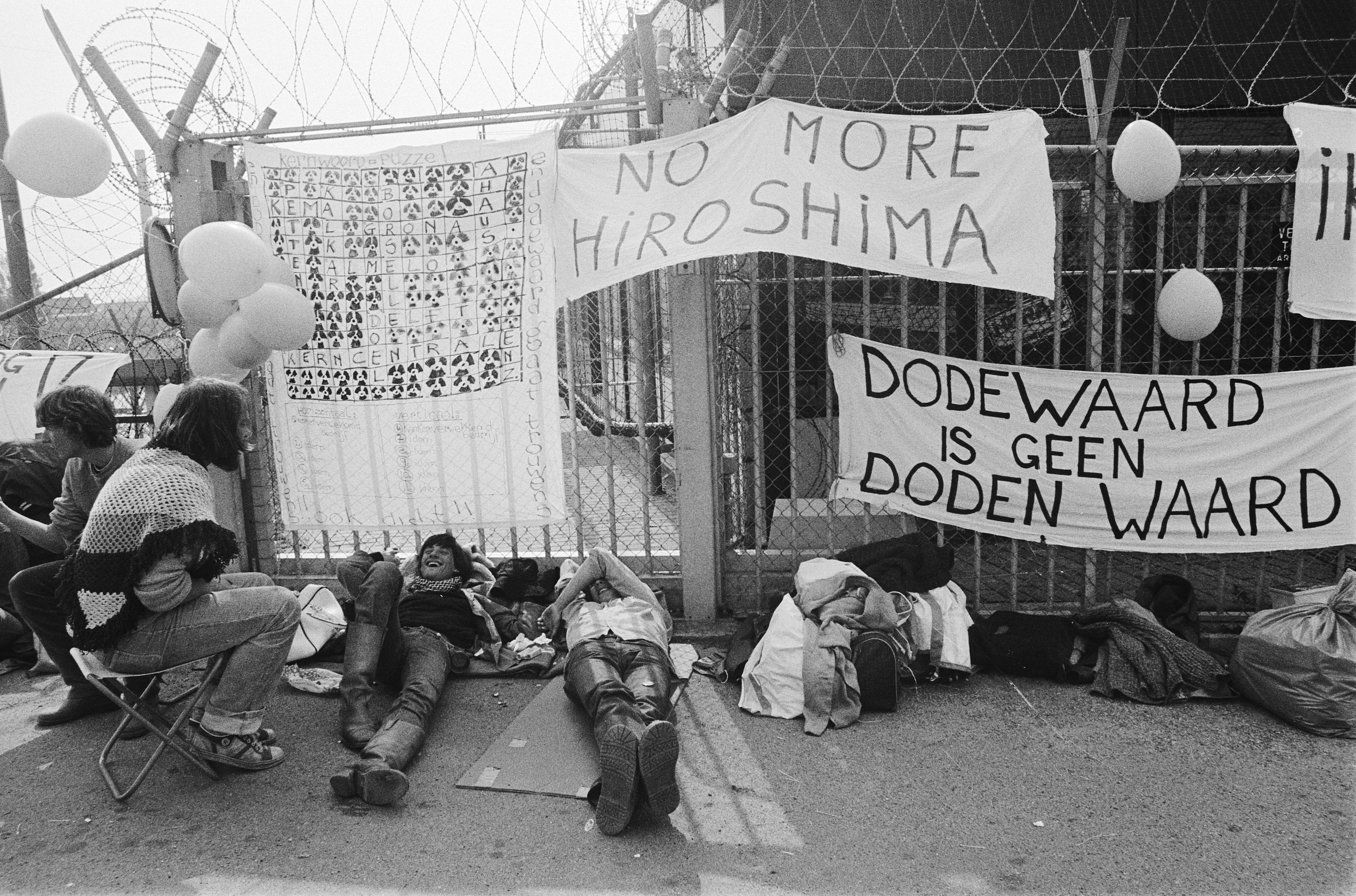
Anti-nuclear protests (1980)
