= List of ships built by Hall, Russell & Company (801–900) =

List of ships built by Aberdeen shipbuilders Hall, Russell & Company, from yard number 801 to 900.

The ships built in the sequence 601 to 800 cover the period 1947 to 1962.

One vessel built during this period by Hall, Russell & Company has become well known in popular culture, a fisheries research vessel built as Sir William Hardy (Yard number 846) was bought by Greenpeace, becoming the first Rainbow Warrior in 1977. The Rainbow Warrior would later be sunk by French Special Forces when it was used to disrupt French nuclear weapons testing in the Pacific.

List of Hall, Russell & Company built ships (801–900)
Name	Image	Yard Number	Construction	Type	Year	Length Overall	Breadth	Depth	Tonnage	Ref(s)
Star of Scotland		801	Steel	Trawler	1947	128 feet 3 inches (39.09 m)	24 feet 7 inches (7.49 m)	13 feet 9 inches (4.19 m)	285 long tons (290 t)	
Enugu		802	Steel	Cargo Steamer	1948	324 feet 10 inches (99.01 m)	45 feet 10 inches (13.97 m)	21 feet 1 inch (6.43 m)	3,028 long tons (3,077 t)	
Caledonian Coast		803		Coaster	1948	261 feet (80 m)	40 feet 1 inch (12.22 m)	15 feet 6 inches (4.72 m)	1,265 long tons (1,285 t)	
Marna		804	Steel	Cargo Steamer	1948	300 feet 9 inches (91.67 m)	46 feet 1 inch (14.05 m)	18 feet (5.5 m)	2,086 long tons (2,119 t)	
Fulham X		805	Steel	Cargo - Collier (Coal)	1948	258 feet (79 m)	39 feet 5 inches (12.01 m)	18 feet 10 inches (5.74 m)	1,759 long tons (1,787 t)	
Vikdal		806	Steel	Cargo	1949	382 feet 6 inches (116.59 m)	60 feet 3 inches (18.36 m)	21 feet 7 inches (6.58 m)	4,667 long tons (4,742 t)	
Byfjord		807		Cargo Steamer	1948	311 feet 2 inches (94.84 m)	44 feet 5 inches (13.54 m)	17 feet 3 inches (5.26 m)	2,009 long tons (2,041 t)	
Nordpol		808	Steel	Cargo	1949	383 feet 4 inches (116.84 m)	60 feet 3 inches (18.36 m)	21 feet 8 inches (6.60 m)	4,728 long tons (4,804 t)	
Salvia		809		Trawler - Steam	1948	132 feet 9 inches (40.46 m)	25 feet 2 inches (7.67 m)	11 feet 5 inches (3.48 m)	332 long tons (337 t)	
Stevia		810		Trawler - Steam	1948	132 feet 9 inches (40.46 m)	25 feet 2 inches (7.67 m)	11 feet 5 inches (3.48 m)	332 long tons (337 t)	
Adriatic Coast		811	Steel	Cargo - Coaster	1949	235 feet 7 inches (71.81 m)	38 feet 1 inch (11.61 m)	15 feet 9 inches (4.80 m)	1,050 long tons (1,070 t)	
Star VI	Star VI/VII	812		Steam Whaler	1948	148 feet (45 m)	29 feet 7 inches (9.02 m)	18 feet 1 inch (5.51 m)	591 long tons (600 t)	
Star VII	Star VI/VII	813		Steam Whaler	1948	148 feet (45 m)	29 feet 7 inches (9.02 m)	18 feet 1 inch (5.51 m)	591 long tons (600 t)	
Murdoch		814	Steel	Cargo - Collier (Coal)	1949	258 feet (79 m)	39 feet 5 inches (12.01 m)	16 feet 8 inches (5.08 m)	1,759 long tons (1,787 t)	
Borre		815	Steel	Cargo	1950	244 feet 7 inches (74.55 m)	38 feet 2 inches (11.63 m)	13 feet (4.0 m)	1,029 long tons (1,046 t)	
Bolt		818	Steel	Cargo	1950	244 feet 2 inches (74.42 m)	38 feet 2 inches (11.63 m)	13 feet (4.0 m)	1,029 long tons (1,046 t)	
Dame Caroline Haslett		819	Steel	Cargo - Collier (Coal)	1950	190 feet 6 inches (58.06 m)	28 feet 1 inch (8.56 m)	14 feet 1 inch (4.29 m)	1,029 long tons (1,046 t)	
Harry Richardson		820	Steel	Cargo - Collier (Coal)	1950	270 feet 6 inches (82.45 m)	39 feet 6 inches (12.04 m)	17 feet 1.5 inches (5.220 m)	1,777 long tons (1,806 t)	
Barok		821	Steel	Cargo	1950	235 feet 7 inches (71.81 m)	38 feet 1 inch (11.61 m)	16 feet (4.9 m)	1,029 long tons (1,046 t)	
Hero		822	Steel	Cargo Steamer	1950	264 feet (80 m)	41 feet 11 inches (12.78 m)	19 feet (5.8 m)	1,838 long tons (1,867 t)	
Hydra		823	Steel	Cargo Steamer	1950	264 feet (80 m)	41 feet 11 inches (12.78 m)	19 feet (5.8 m)	1,838 long tons (1,867 t)	
Hrefna		824		Trawler - Steam	1951	183 feet 11 inches (56.06 m)	30 feet 1 inch (9.17 m)	16 feet (4.9 m)	681 long tons (692 t)	
Olafur Johannessen		825		Trawler - Steam	1951	183 feet 11 inches (56.06 m)	30 feet 1 inch (9.17 m)	16 feet (4.9 m)	681 long tons (692 t)	
Drofn		826		Trawler - Steam	1951	183 feet 11 inches (56.06 m)	30 feet 1 inch (9.17 m)	16 feet (4.9 m)	681 long tons (692 t)	
Cape St. Mary		827		Fisheries research vessel	1951	100 feet 3 inches (30.56 m)	25 feet 1 inch (7.65 m)	12 feet 6 inches (3.81 m)	242 long tons (246 t)	
Pol XV		828	Steel	Steam Whaler	1951	148 feet (45 m)	29 feet 7 inches (9.02 m)	18 feet 1 inch (5.51 m)	590 long tons (600 t)	
Anno		829	Steel	Cargo - Coaster	1952	120 feet (37 m)	24 feet 1 inch (7.34 m)	9 feet (2.7 m)	293 long tons (298 t)	
Howard Smith		830	Steel	Tug	1952	126 feet (38 m)	32 feet (9.8 m)	15 feet (4.6 m)	499 long tons (507 t)	
Ajasa		831		Cargo - Collier (Coal)	1953	330 feet (100 m)	46 feet (14 m)	21 feet (6.4 m)	3,262 long tons (3,314 t)	
Cormoor		832	Steel	Cargo - Collier (Coal)	1953	320 feet (98 m)	46 feet 1 inch (14.05 m)	22 feet 5 inches (6.83 m)	3,374 long tons (3,428 t)	
Bow Santos		833	Steel	Cargo	1954	398 feet (121 m)	58 feet (18 m)	37 feet (11 m)	4,939 long tons (5,018 t)	
Binna		834	Steel	Cargo - Timber	1953	266 feet (81 m)	44 feet 1 inch (13.44 m)	19 feet (5.8 m)	1,858 long tons (1,888 t)	
Sir David II		835		Cargo - Collier (Coal)	1954	320 feet 10 inches (97.79 m)	46 feet 1 inch (14.05 m)	22 feet 5 inches (6.83 m)	3,332 long tons (3,385 t)	
David Pollock		836	Steel	Cargo - Collier (Coal)	1954	320 feet (98 m)	46 feet 1 inch (14.05 m)	22 feet 5 inches (6.83 m)	3,332 long tons (3,385 t)	
Thomas Goulden		837	Steel	Cargo - Collier (Coal)	1955	320 feet (98 m)	46 feet 1 inch (14.05 m)	22 feet 5 inches (6.83 m)	3,332 long tons (3,385 t)	
Whitby Abbey		838	Steel	Cargo	1954	240 feet 7 inches (73.33 m)	38 feet 7 inches (11.76 m)	21 feet 7 inches (6.58 m)	1,197 long tons (1,216 t)	
Fountains Abbey		839	Steel	Cargo	1954	256 feet 2 inches (78.08 m)	38 feet 8 inches (11.79 m)	13 feet (4.0 m)	1,197 long tons (1,216 t)	
James Rowan		840	Steel	Cargo - Collier (Coal)	1955	323 feet 10 inches (98.70 m)	43 feet 4 inches (13.21 m)	20 feet 4 inches (6.20 m)	2,947 long tons (2,994 t)	
Sir John Snell		841	Steel	Cargo - Collier (Coal)	1955	323 feet 10 inches (98.70 m)	43 feet 4 inches (13.21 m)	20 feet 4 inches (6.20 m)	2,947 long tons (2,994 t)	
Charles H. Merz		842	Steel	Cargo - Collier (Coal)	1955	323 feet (98 m)	40 feet (12 m)	20 feet (6.1 m)	2,947 long tons (2,994 t)	
Stephen Brown		844	Steel	Cargo - Collier (Coal)	1954	240 feet 7 inches (73.33 m)	40 feet 1 inch (12.22 m)	16 feet 10 inches (5.13 m)	1,464 long tons (1,487 t)	
Bruin		845		Cargo - Timber	1955	285 feet 6 inches (87.02 m)	44 feet 4 inches (13.51 m)	16 feet 10 inches (5.13 m)	1,879 long tons (1,909 t)	
Sir William Hardy	Rainbow Warrior (1955)	846	Steel	Fisheries research vessel	1955	127 feet 10 inches (38.96 m)	27 feet 7 inches (8.41 m)	15 feet (4.6 m)	418 long tons (425 t)	
Sugar Importer		847		Cargo - Bulk Sugar	1955	330 feet (100 m)	50 feet 1 inch (15.27 m)	26 feet 7 inches (8.10 m)	4,024 long tons (4,089 t)	
Sugar Exporter		848		Cargo - Bulk Sugar	1955	330 feet 10 inches (100.84 m)	50 feet 1 inch (15.27 m)	26 feet 7 inches (8.10 m)	4,024 long tons (4,089 t)	
Esso Preston		849	Steel	Tanker - Bitumen	1956	299 feet (91 m)	43 feet 6 inches (13.26 m)	17 feet 4 inches (5.28 m)	1,965 long tons (1,997 t)	
Bonavista		852	Steel	Passenger and Cargo	1956	214 feet 9 inches (65.46 m)	35 feet 1 inch (10.69 m)	17 feet 2 inches (5.23 m)	1,174 long tons (1,193 t)	
Nonia		853	Steel	Passenger and Cargo	1956	214 feet 9 inches (65.46 m)	35 feet 1 inch (10.69 m)	17 feet 3 inches (5.26 m)	1,174 long tons (1,193 t)	
Century		854		Cargo	1956	356 feet (109 m)	50 feet 6 inches (15.39 m)	22 feet (6.7 m)	4,245 long tons (4,313 t)	
Shoreham		855	Steel	Cargo - Collier (Coal)	1957	242 feet (74 m)	40 feet 6 inches (12.34 m)	17 feet (5.2 m)	1,834 long tons (1,863 t)	
Rona		856	Steel	Cargo - Molasses, Sugar and General	1957	390 feet (120 m)	54 feet 8 inches (16.66 m)	23 feet 9 inches (7.24 m)	4,469 long tons (4,541 t)	
Corsea		857	Steel	Cargo - Collier (Coal)	1957	339 feet (103 m)	46 feet (14 m)	20 feet 3 inches (6.17 m)	3,373 long tons (3,427 t)	
Sugar Producer		858		Cargo - Bulk Sugar	1957	370 feet 11 inches (113.06 m)	53 feet (16 m)	28 feet 1 inch (8.56 m)	5,088 long tons (5,170 t)	
Sugar Transporter		859		Cargo - Bulk Sugar	1957	370 feet (110 m)	53 feet (16 m)	28 feet (8.5 m)	6,550 long tons (6,660 t)	
Abel Tasman		860	Steel	Cargo	1957	290 feet 9 inches (88.62 m)	44 feet 7 inches (13.59 m)	22 feet 4 inches (6.81 m)	2,681 long tons (2,724 t)	
Dulwich		861	Steel	Cargo - Collier (Coal)	1957	262 feet (80 m)	39 feet 5 inches (12.01 m)	18 feet 7 inches (5.66 m)	1,873 long tons (1,903 t)	
Ewell		862		Cargo - Collier (Coal)	1958	275 feet (84 m)	39 feet (12 m)	17 feet (5.2 m)	1,877 long tons (1,907 t)	
Lambeth		863	Steel	Cargo - Collier (Coal)	1958	262 feet 1 inch (79.88 m)	39 feet 5 inches (12.01 m)	18 feet 7 inches (5.66 m)	1,877 long tons (1,907 t)	
Camberwell		864	Steel	Cargo - Collier (Coal)	1958	262 feet 2 inches (79.91 m)	39 feet 5 inches (12.01 m)	18 feet 7 inches (5.66 m)	1,877 long tons (1,907 t)	
Meringa	Meringa (1958)	865	Steel	Cargo - Bulk Sugar	1958	411 feet 5 inches (125.40 m)	53 feet 5 inches (16.28 m)	22 feet 10 inches (6.96 m)	5,459 long tons (5,547 t)	
Sugar Refiner		866		Cargo - Bulk Sugar	1958	370 feet 11 inches (113.06 m)	53 feet 2 inches (16.21 m)	28 feet 1 inch (8.56 m)	5,104 long tons (5,186 t)	
Holmside		867	Steel	Cargo - Bulk Sugar/Ore	1959	370 feet 11 inches (113.06 m)	53 feet 2 inches (16.21 m)	28 feet 1 inch (8.56 m)	5,034 long tons (5,115 t)	
Eleuthera		868	Steel	Cargo	1959	360 feet 11 inches (110.01 m)	54 feet 2 inches (16.51 m)	33 feet 4 inches (10.16 m)	5,407 long tons (5,494 t)	
Cienfuego		869	Steel	Cargo	1959	360 feet 11 inches (110.01 m)	54 feet 2 inches (16.51 m)	33 feet 4 inches (10.16 m)	5,407 long tons (5,494 t)	
Tafawa Balewa		870	Steel	Cargo - Collier (Coal)	1959	323 feet 6 inches (98.60 m)	46 feet 1 inch (14.05 m)	21 feet 7 inches (6.58 m)	3,211 long tons (3,263 t)	
Sugar Carrier		871	Steel	Cargo - Bulk Sugar	1959	401 feet (122 m)	58 feet (18 m)	32 feet (9.8 m)	6,358 long tons (6,460 t)	
Point Fortin		872	Steel	Cargo - Lighter	1959	204 feet 6 inches (62.33 m)	35 feet 1 inch (10.69 m)	16 feet 5 inches (5.00 m)	993 long tons (1,009 t)	
Ballyloran	Ballyloran (1958)	874	Steel	Cargo	1958	205 feet 6 inches (62.64 m)	33 feet 10 inches (10.31 m)	14 feet 6 inches (4.42 m)	1,092 long tons (1,110 t)	
Ballylesson		875	Steel	Cargo	1958	205 feet 6 inches (62.64 m)	33 feet 10 inches (10.31 m)	14 feet 6 inches (4.42 m)	1,092 long tons (1,110 t)	
Santona		877	Steel	Cargo	1959	271 feet (83 m)	44 feet 7 inches (13.59 m)	26 feet 1 inch (7.95 m)	1,769 long tons (1,797 t)	
Colina		878		Cargo	1960	271 feet (83 m)	44 feet 7 inches (13.59 m)	26 feet 1 inch (7.95 m)	1,776 long tons (1,804 t)	
Woodside		879	Steel	Trawler	1959	98 feet 9 inches (30.10 m)	23 feet 1 inch (7.04 m)	11 feet (3.4 m)	190 long tons (190 t)	
Countesswells		880		Trawler	1960	98 feet 9 inches (30.10 m)	23 feet 1 inch (7.04 m)	11 feet (3.4 m)	190 long tons (190 t)	
Maureen Croan		881	Steel	Trawler	1960	106 feet 3 inches (32.39 m)	23 feet (7.0 m)	12 feet (3.7 m)	234 long tons (238 t)	
Boston Wasp		882		Trawler	1960	114 feet 10 inches (35.00 m)	26 feet 1 inch (7.95 m)	13 feet (4.0 m)	300 long tons (300 t)	
Princess Royal		883		Trawler	1960	114 feet 10 inches (35.00 m)	26 feet 1 inch (7.95 m)	13 feet (4.0 m)	300 long tons (300 t)	
Malcolm Croan		884		Trawler	1960	106 feet 3 inches (32.39 m)	23 feet 10 inches (7.26 m)	12 feet (3.7 m)	234 long tons (238 t)	
Aberdeen Venturer		885	Steel	Trawler	1960	115 feet 10 inches (35.31 m)	26 feet (7.9 m)	13 feet 3 inches (4.04 m)	298 long tons (303 t)	
Granton Merlin		886		Trawler	1960	106 feet 3 inches (32.39 m)	23 feet 10 inches (7.26 m)	12 feet (3.7 m)	235 long tons (239 t)	
Star of the Isles		887		Trawler	1960	106 feet 3 inches (32.39 m)	23 feet 10 inches (7.26 m)	12 feet (3.7 m)	226 long tons (230 t)	
Star of Scotland		888		Trawler	1960	106 feet 3 inches (32.39 m)	23 feet 10 inches (7.26 m)	12 feet (3.7 m)	226 long tons (230 t)	
Glengairn		889		Trawler	1960	106 feet 3 inches (32.39 m)	23 feet 10 inches (7.26 m)	12 feet (3.7 m)	228 long tons (232 t)	
Letitia		890	Steel	Cargo	1961	385 feet 11 inches (117.63 m)	58 feet 2 inches (17.73 m)	26 feet 5 inches (8.05 m)	4,499 long tons (4,571 t)	
Admiral Drake		891		Trawler	1960	114 feet 5 inches (34.87 m)	26 feet 1 inch (7.95 m)	13 feet (4.0 m)	225 long tons (229 t)	
Admiral Jellicoe		892		Trawler	1961	114 feet 5 inches (34.87 m)	26 feet 1 inch (7.95 m)	13 feet (4.0 m)	306 long tons (311 t)	
Admiral Hawke		893		Trawler	1961	114 feet 5 inches (34.87 m)	26 feet 1 inch (7.95 m)	13 feet (4.0 m)	225 long tons (229 t)	
Gosforth		894	Steel	Cargo	1961	383 feet 11 inches (117.02 m)	56 feet 4 inches (17.17 m)	31 feet (9.4 m)	5,675 long tons (5,766 t)	
Coloso		896		Tug	1961	90 feet 3 inches (27.51 m)	25 feet 1 inch (7.65 m)	12 feet 6 inches (3.81 m)	176 long tons (179 t)	
Admiral Burnett		897		Trawler	1961	138 feet (42 m)	28 feet 1 inch (8.56 m)	14 feet (4.3 m)	391 long tons (397 t)	
Mannofield		898		Trawler	1961	106 feet 3 inches (32.39 m)	23 feet 10 inches (7.26 m)	12 feet (3.7 m)	226 long tons (230 t)	
Discovery	RRS Discovery	899	Steel	Research Vessel	1962	235 feet 7 inches (71.81 m)	46 feet 1 inch (14.05 m)	18 feet 1 inch (5.51 m)	2,665 long tons (2,708 t)	
Junella		900	Steel	Trawler	1962	208 feet 6 inches (63.55 m)	38 feet 6 inches (11.73 m)	26 feet 3 inches (8.00 m)	1,435 long tons (1,458 t)	

== Notes ==
- Yard Numbers 816, 817 unused, likely cancelled.
- Yard Number 843 unused, likely cancelled.
- Yard Numbers 850, 851 unused, likely cancelled.
- Yard Number 873 unused, likely cancelled.
- Yard Number 876 unused, likely cancelled.
- Yard Number 895 cancelled in 1961.

== Bibliography ==
- Bush, Steve (2005). British Warships and Auxiliaries. Liskeard, Cornwall: Maritime Books. ISBN 1-904459-11-0.
