= Stellini =

Stellini is an Italian surname. Notable people with the surname include:

- Cristian Stellini (born 1974), Italian footballer and manager
- Jacopo Stellini (1699–1770), Italian abbot, writer and philosopher
- Maria Antonia Scalera Stellini (1634–1704), Italian poet and playwright
