= Omanhene Cocoa Bean Company =

American cocoa processing company

- Headquarters: Milwaukee, Wisconsin, United States
- Products: Chocolate
- Website: www.omanhene.com

Omanhene Cocoa Bean Company is a chocolate company headquartered in Milwaukee, Wisconsin, United States. Omanhene's chocolate beans come from the forests of Ghana. The difference between Omanhene's chocolate and their competitors is that Omanhene's chocolate bars are made and processed in Ghana, whereas competitors buy the beans from a tropical country and ship them to countries like Canada or the United States to make chocolate bars.

== History ==
The Omanhene Cocoa Bean Company was founded in 1991 by Steven C. Wallace and his brother, Jonathan. Steven was an AFS high school student and lived in Ghana for three months in 1978. However, at the age of 29 (in 1991), he returned to Ghana and started a chocolate business. The name Omanhene in the Twi language means the "Paramount Chief".

The factory workers and family farmers have a stake in the Omanhene Cocoa Bean Company.

The company was an early adopter of the UN Global Compact.

In October 2022, Niche Cocoa Company Limited announced the plan to open a cocoa processing plant with Omanhene Cocoa in Franklin, Milwaukee County, Wisconsin.

== See also ==
- World Affairs Seminar 2006 speech on Monday, June 19, 2006
