= Giandomenico Picco =

UN Assistant Secretary-General for Political Affairs (1948–2024)

- Born: 8 October 1948; Italy
- Died: 10 March 2024 (aged 75); Wilton, Connecticut, U.S.
- Other names: Gianni Picco
- Education: University of Padua; University of Prague; University of Amsterdam
- Alma mater: UC Santa Barbara
- Occupations: United Nations officer; UN Assistant Secretary-General for Political Affairs
- Years active: 1972–2017
- Known for: Negotiations during the Lebanon hostage crisis
- Notable work: Man Without a Gun (1999)
- Spouses: Elena Carretta (divorced); Kate Cooney (divorced)
- Children: Giacomo Picco, Liam Picco
- Awards: see below

Giandomenico Picco (8 October 1948 – 10 March 2024), also known as Gianni Picco, was an Italian diplomat and United Nations Assistant Secretary-General for Political Affairs, who negotiated the release of 11 hostages held by terrorists in Lebanon, earning him the epithets "chief troubleshooter" and "unarmed soldier of diplomacy" from United Nations Secretary-General Javier Pérez de Cuéllar.

== Background ==
Giandomenico Picco was born on 8 October 1948 in Udine, Italy. He studied at the Liceo Classico Jacopo Stellini in Udine, Italy, BA in political science at the University of Padua, MA in international relations and comparative politics at the University of California at Santa Barbara (via the U.S.-Italy Fulbright Commission), the University of Prague, and a diploma in European integration studies at the University of Amsterdam.

== Career ==
=== United Nations ===
Picco began a 20-year career with the United Nations in 1973 and served there until 1992. In 1976, Picco began working with Pérez de Cuéllar in Cyprus, where Picco was serving as political affairs officer to the United Nations Force in Cyprus who reported to its head, Pérez de Cuéllar. In 1985–86, Picco represented Pérez de Cuéllar (who had succeeded Kurt Waldheim as UN Secretary-General) in negotiations between France and New Zealand over the sinking of the Greenpeace ship Rainbow Warrior. In 1988, he helped negotiate the Soviet withdrawal from Afghanistant.

Picco's efforts were extremely sensitive: "His trips are often shrouded in mystery, and United Nations officials have tried to keep his current movements even more secret." Often, the only news of his whereabouts or activities were "on mission". Pérez de Cuéllar was known to deny Picco's involvement in some active hostage negotiation, while journalists might happen to sight him in places like Damascus, Syria.

==== Peace negotiations ====
Picco led or participated in peace negotiations including:

- 1987: Cease-fire in the Iran–Iraq War
- 1988: Geneva agreements leading to Soviet withdrawal from Afghanistan

==== Hostage negotiations ====
Picco served as Pérez de Cuéllar's personal representative to negotiate release of hostages. and may have instigated them. Among those with whom Picco negotiated was Mohammad Javad Zarif.

Picco led hostage negotiations including:

- 1989-1992: Release of 11 hostages during the Lebanon hostage crisis including Anglican reverend Terry Waite, AP bureau chief Terry A. Anderson, Edward Austin Tracy, and John McCarthy (journalist) from the Shi'ite militia Revolutionary Justice Organization
- 1999: Release of 13 Jews arrested in Shiraz, Iran, and charged with espionage. At the request of American Jewish leaders, Picco intervened with Iranian President Khatami and succeeded in obtaining the release of all prisoners.

(Among hostages Picco could not save were American soldiers William Francis Buckley and William R. Higgins.)

=== Private negotiations ===
In 1992, Picco left the UN In 1994, he formed the international consulting firm GDP Associates for business negotiations, based in New York City. He also became president of the Peace Strategies Project, based in Geneva, Switzerland, and US Equity Partners Holdings, LLC. He also served as director of Levcor International, Inc., and the Carlyle Group.

The Pio Manzù International Research Centre's International Scientific Committee included Picco as vice president and Mikhail Gorbachev. On their behalf, he presented an award to Diana, Princess of Wales.

Picco also spoke to the World Affairs Seminar and gave a keynote address to the Institute for Cultural Diplomacy in 2017.

=== Dialogue Among Civilizations ===
See Dialogue Among Civilizations

In 1999, UN Secretary General Kofi Annan appointed Picco as Personal Representative for the UN Year of Dialogue Among Civilizations, proclaimed in 1998. Members included Chinese philosopher Tu Weiming.

== Personal life ==
Picco married twice, firstly to Elena Carretta Toth and secondly to Kate Glucksman. His son Giacomo Picco is an investment banker.

Picco served on the Ambassador's Council of the United Nations Association/USA, the European-American Chamber of Commerce, and the International Peace Academy.

Giandomenico Picco died on 10 March 2024, at the age of 75. The United Nations noted the passing of Picco as "a legendary UN staffer" who played "a major part in many key hotspots... admired by many" on 13 March 2024. Former Italian diplomat Marco Carnelos called Picco "a great Italian diplomat" who "unfortunately for my home country... did not work for the Italian foreign service."

== Awards ==
On 12 December 1991, US President George H. W. Bush presented the Medal of Freedom to Pérez de Cuéllar and the Presidential Award for Exceptional Service to Picco, while welcoming home American hostages Thomas Sutherland, Alann Steen, Jesse Turner, Joseph Cicippio, and Terry Anderson. Of Picco, President Bush said, "In his years as Special Envoy at the United Nations, Assistant Secretary-General Gianni Picco has sought always to serve peace and to resolve conflict."

- 1991: Presidential Award for Exceptional Service (United States of America)
- 1993: Order of St. Michael and St. George (United Kingdom)
- 1992: Order of Merit (Federal Republic of Germany)
- 1993: National Order of the Cedar (Lebanese Republic)
- 1993: Order of Grande Ufficiale della Repubblica (Italy)
- 1994: Honorary Doctorate of Human Letters, Marywood University

== Works ==
Picco's principal work, Man Without a Gun (1999), received favorable notices. Kirkus reviews wrote, "A must-read for anyone who wants to know what the UN really does." Publishers Weekly wrote, "This memoir of an extraordinary career reads like a combination of a thriller and a textbook on the delicate and dangerous art of diplomacy in an often explosive region."

The documentary film, Dawn at Midnight (2014) by Cetywa Powell draws in part from Picco's memoir Man Without a Gun (1999).

Books (English)

- Lessons of the Iran-Iraq War (1990)
- International Solidarity and National Sovereignty (Giovanni Delli Zotti, co-editor) (1995)
- Man Without a Gun (1999)
- Crossing the Divide: Dialogue Among Civilizations editor/contributor with others (2001)
- The Fog of Peace with Gabriel Rifkind (2013)

Books (Italian)

- I labirinti del presente with Antonio Torrenzano (2004)

Articles

- "The UN and the Use of Force: Leave the Secretary General Out of It," Foreign Affairs (September/October 1976)
- "A New Afghanistan in a New International Construct," Carnegie Council's U.S. Global Engagement Initiative (USGE) (2014)

Interviews from the United Nations

- 1998.09.23: Giandomenico Picco, Director of the UN Office for Special Political Affairs
- 1990.05.24: Giandomenico Picco, Director and Assistant to the UN Secretary-General for Special Assignments
- 1991.12.06: Giandomenico Picco, UN Assistant Secretary-General
- 2000.04.20: Giandomenico Picco, Personal Representative of the Secretary-General to the United Nations Year of Dialogue Among Civilizations

== See also ==
- Dialogue Among Civilizations
- Javier Pérez de Cuéllar
- Lebanon hostage crisis
- Rainbow Warrior (1955)
- United Nations
