= MV Esperanza =

Greenpeace ship built in 1984

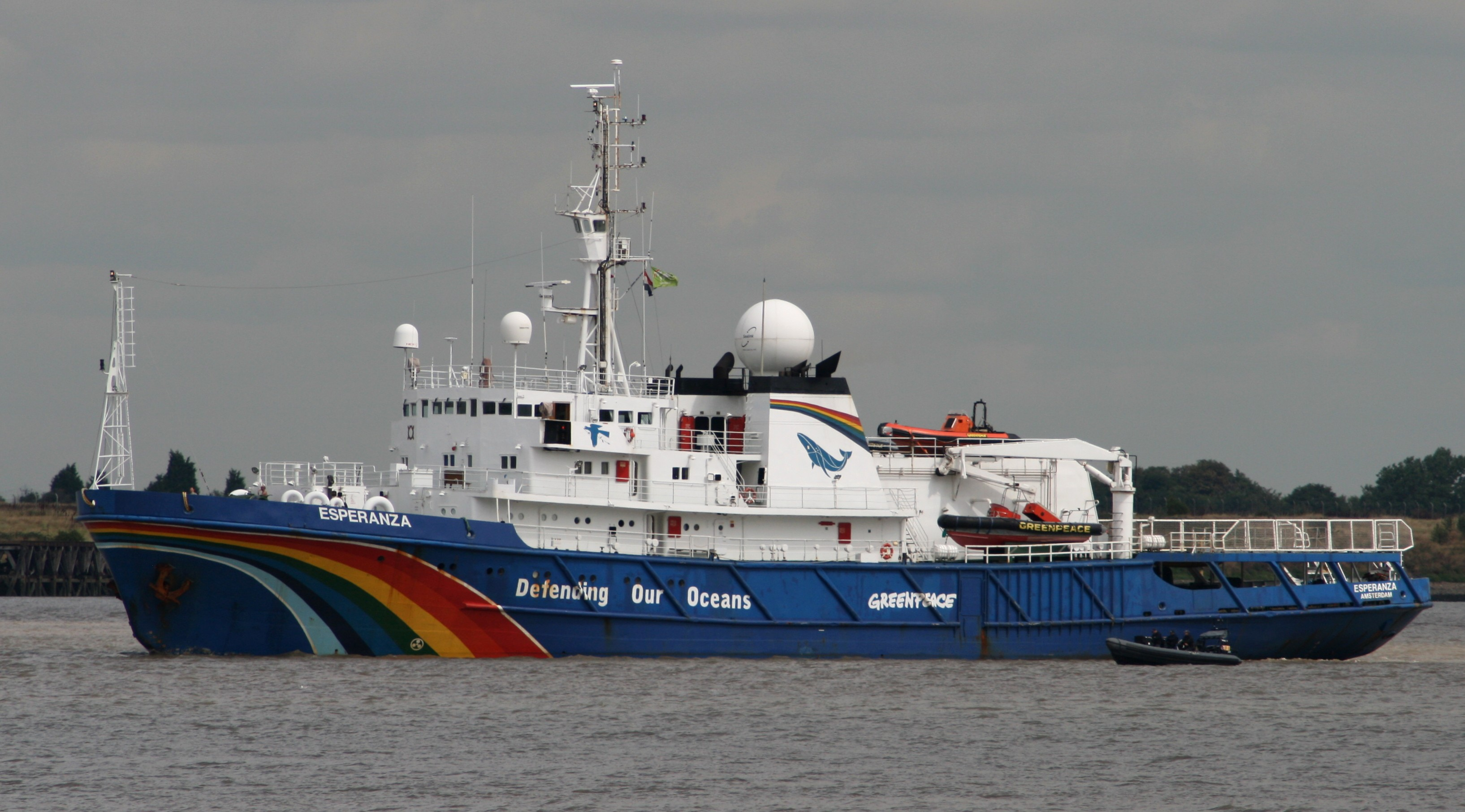
- Esperanza on the River Thames off Gravesend, England, August 2010.

History

Soviet Union
- Name: Vikhr-4
- Operator: Northern Fleet
- Builder: Stocznia Północna, Gdansk, Poland
- Yard number: B98/04
- Launched: 1984
- Renamed: 1998
- Fate: Sold to Greenpeace

Netherlands
- Name: Esperanza
- Owner: Stichting Phoenix Maastricht
- Operator: Greenpeace
- Port of registry: Amsterdam, Netherlands
- Acquired: 2000
- Recommissioned: 2002
- Out of service: 2022
- Identification: IMO number: 8404599; MMSI number: 244690000; Callsign: PD 6464
- Fate: Scrapped in Gijón, Spain, 2022
- Notes: Former names: Vikhr-4, Echo Fighter, Eco Fighter

General characteristics
- Class & type: Built as Type B98 expedition/research ship
- Tonnage: 2,076 GT
- Length: 72.3 m (237 ft 2 in) o/a
- Beam: 14.3 m (46 ft 11 in)
- Draft: 4.7 m (15 ft 5 in)
- Ice class: 1A
- Propulsion: 2 × 2,938 bhp (2,191 kW) Sulzer V12 engines
- Speed: 18.8 knots (34.8 km/h; 21.6 mph)
- Range: 19,000 nmi (35,000 km; 22,000 mi)
- Boats & landing craft carried: 2 large and 3 small rigid-hulled inflatable boats (RHIB)
- Crew: 33
- Aviation facilities: Helipad

MV Esperanza was a ship operated by Greenpeace. Previous to being a Greenpeace ship it was a fire-fighting vessel owned by the Soviet Navy, built in 1984. It was recommissioned in 2000 and relaunched in 2002 after being named Esperanza ('hope' in Spanish) by visitors to the Greenpeace website. It had undergone a major refit by Greenpeace to make it more environmentally friendly. A new helicopter deck and boat cranes were also added. The ship was powered by two Sulzer V12 marine diesel engines.

The ship had a heavy ice class, giving it the ability to work in polar regions. It had a top speed of 16 knots (30 km/h; 18 mph) and an overall length of 72.3 metres (237 ft 2 in). This made it the fastest and largest of the Greenpeace fleet.

Original painted in blue livery, during December 2014 it called at Palumbo Malta Superyachts for repairs and a new livery, acquiring a green hull like other Greenpeace vessels.

Esperanza has been involved in many world wide campaigns, protecting environment and wildlife. She was decommissioned and sold for scrap in 2022.

== Equipment aboard ==
Greenpeace added live webcams to the Esperanza in 2006. The webcams are positioned on the bow of the ship, the mast and the bridge, they send a new image every minute to their Defending Our Oceans website and provide an archive of action.

In April 2006, the Esperanza was equipped with state-of-the-art underwater monitoring equipment, including a remotely operated vehicle (ROV) which can shoot video down to a depth of 300 metres (980 ft), and a drop camera capable of reaching depths of 1,000 metres (3,300 ft).

In early 2006, Esperanza was equipped with a double-hulled floating vessel, called the "Yellow Thing" and used by Greenpeace to sample marine debris. Its primary mission was to trawl for plastic samples in areas such as the Mediterranean Sea and the North Pacific Gyre. It is not self-powered, rather it is towed via a ship-attached boom. It is also considered to be relatively stable as a marine vehicle.

== Operational career ==
The Esperanza participated in fishery patrols with Kiribati and the Marshall Islands in 2006. In January 2017, the ship launched an ROV off the Atlantic Coast of Brazil to help document the largely unknown Amazon Reef in advance of planned developments by oil companies.

In 2020 the Esperanza sailed the Protect the Oceans campaign, a voyage from the Arctic to the Antarctic. This almost year-long voyage was one of Greenpeace’s biggest ever expeditions and highlighted the many threats the oceans are facing.

With Greenpeace’s vision for a zero-carbon future, it was decided to retire the Esperanza. Early 2022 she was decommissioned and sold for scrap to Spain. Her last voyage she sailed 7 February 2022 from her homeport Amsterdam to Bilbao. Then from Bilbao to Gijón where she arrived 12 February 2022, to be dismantled and recycled.

== See also ==
- Rainbow Warrior (2011)
- MV Arctic Sunrise
- MY Steve Irwin (Flagship of the Sea Shepherd Conservation Society)

== Gallery ==
Esperanza

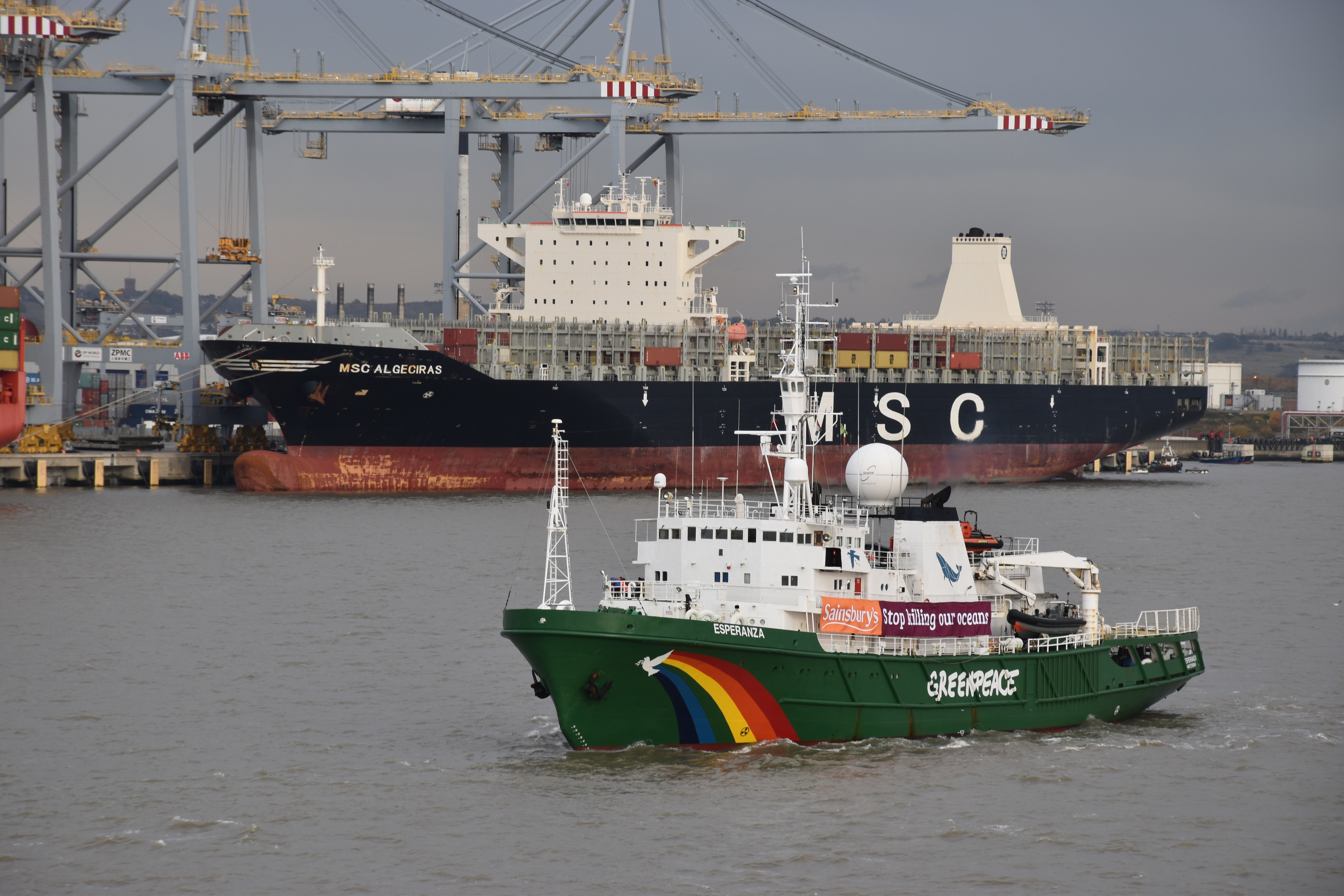
River Thames, 2016

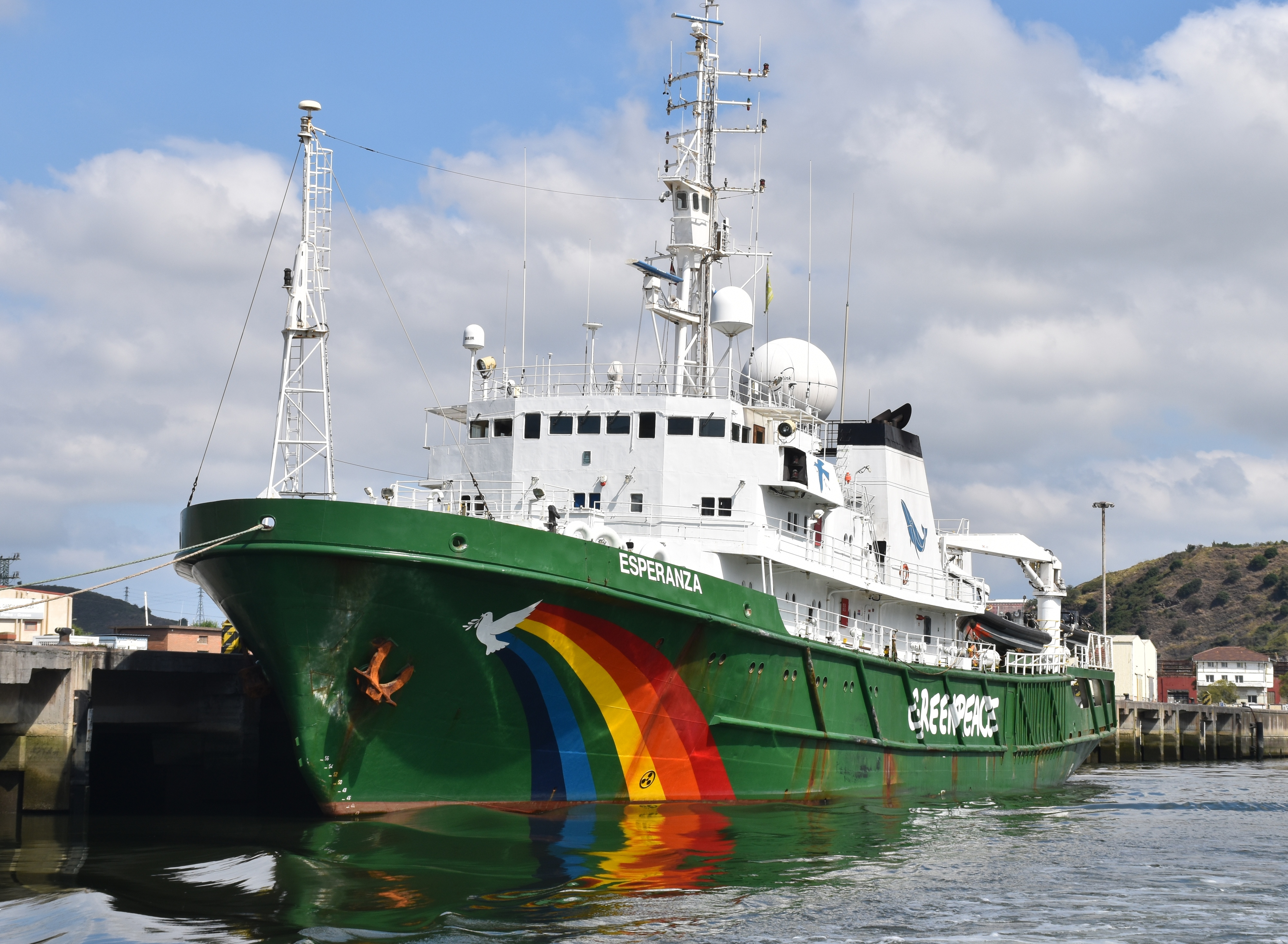
Bilbao, August 2017

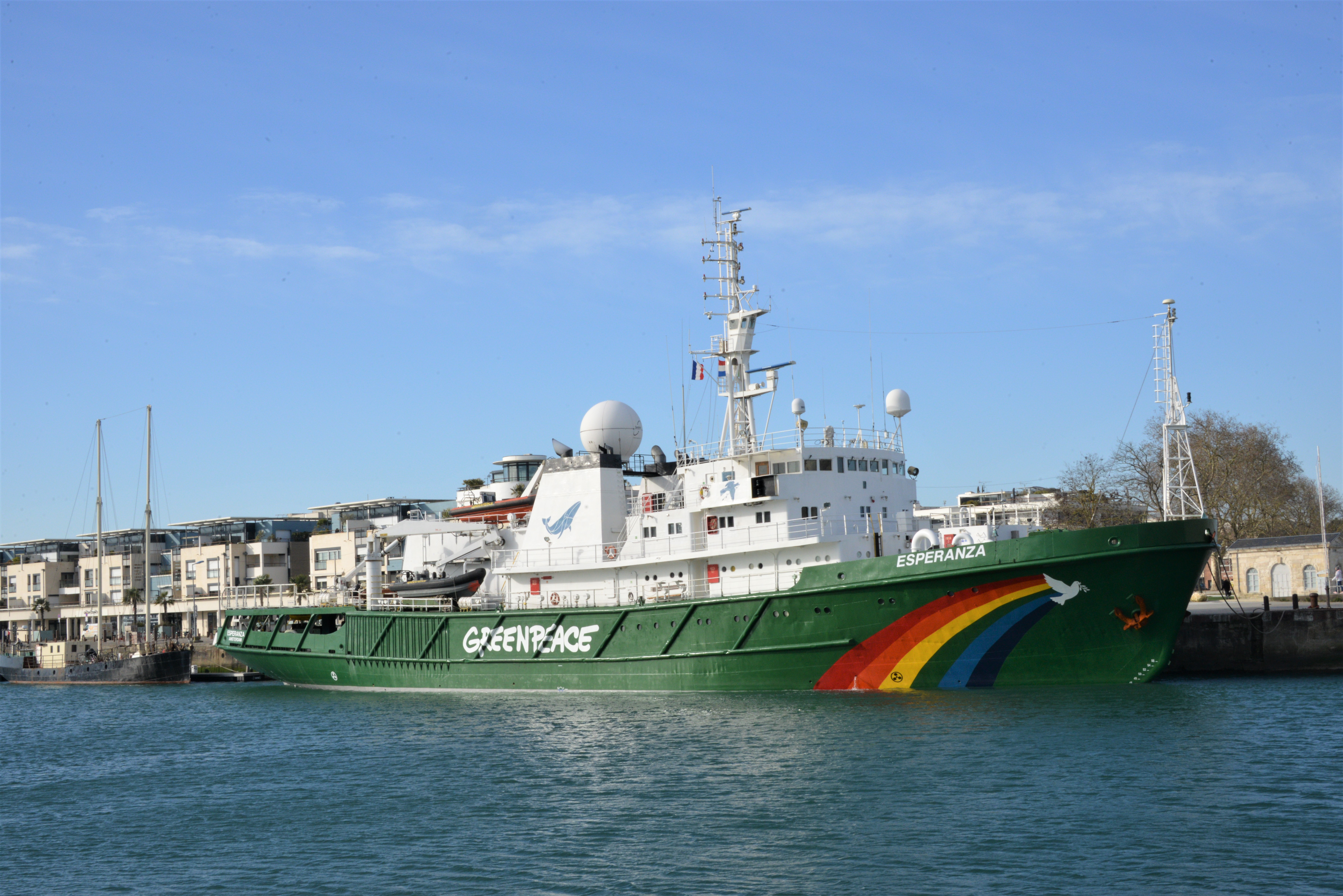
La Rochelle, February 2018

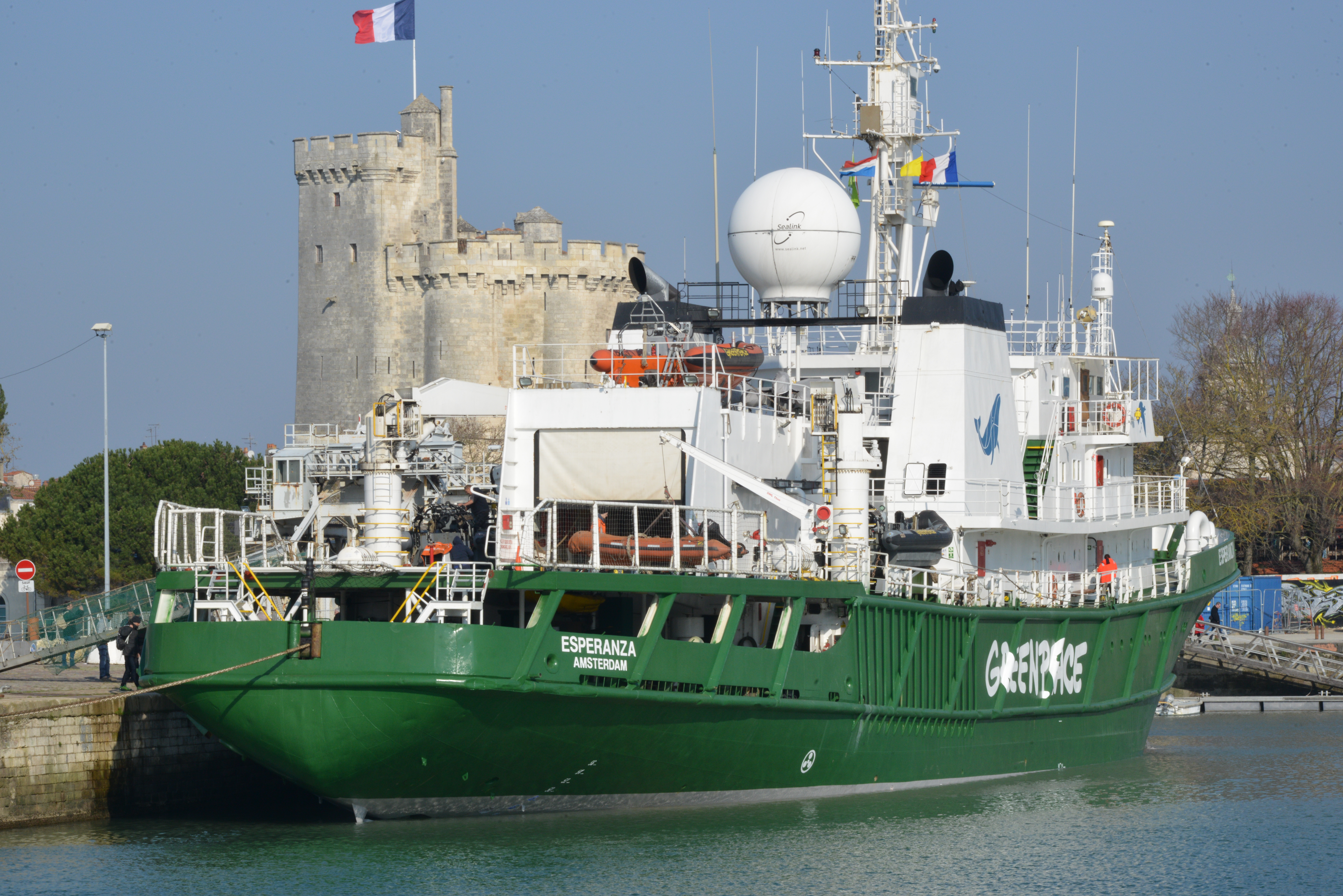
Stern view

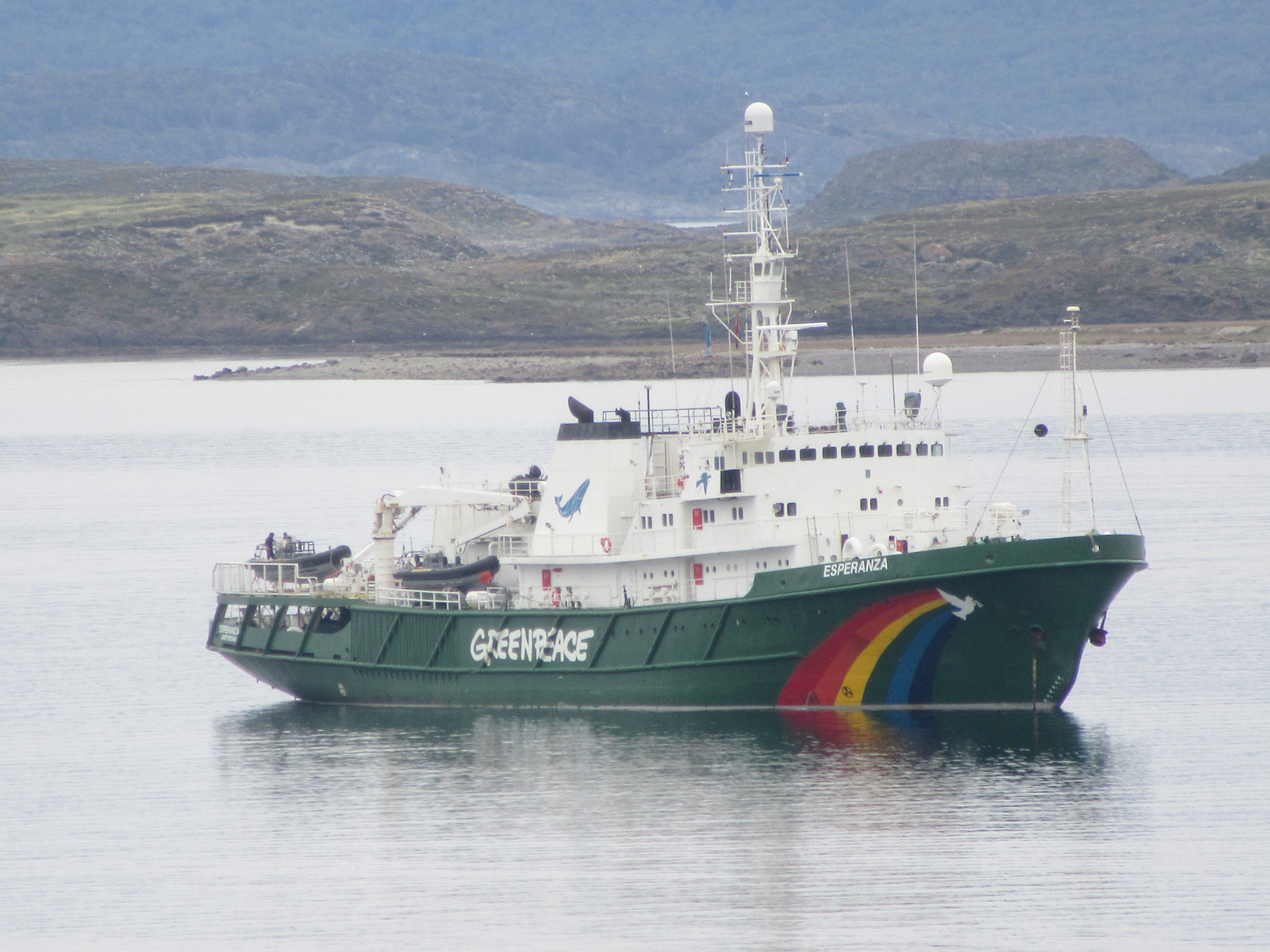
Antarctic expedition, 2019

== External ==
- Greenpeace's Esperanza page
- live webcam aboard Greenpeace's boats, including the Esperanza
- narrated virtual tour of the ship
- Esperanza on YouTube

anza being broken down shown towards the end of this video 2.16
