= Jacopo Stellini =

Italian abbot and philosopher

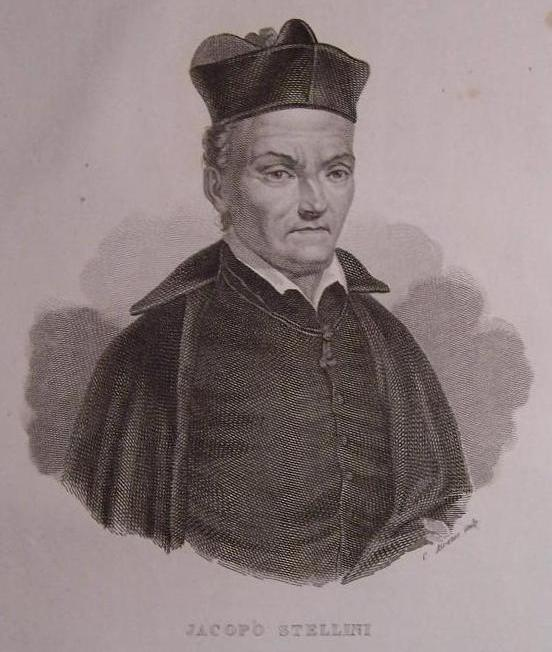
Jacopo Stellini

Jacopo Stellini (27 April 1699 – 27 March 1770) was an Italian abbot, polymath writer and philosopher.

== Biography ==
Born in Cividale del Friuli to a family of modest means; his father was a tailor. Stellini was first educated by the Somaschi order, and he joined the order in 1718. He moved to Venice where he studied in the seminary in Murano, and was made a priest in 1722. In Venice, he served as a tutor to the prominent Emo family, and the patronage in 1739 helped him land a professor position teaching "moral philosophy" at the University of Padua.

His main work is the essay in Latin, titled, De ortu et progressu morum, o De ortu et progressu morum atque opinionum ad more pertinentium and translated into Italian as Saggio dell'origine e del progresso de' costumi e delle opinioni a' medesimi pertinenti (Essay upon the origin and progress of customs (behaviors) and opinions pertinent to them (1740). Other works include the posthumous Ethicae seu moralium disputationum libri VII and Lucubrationes ethicae (1778). His works are infused with a scholastic understanding of Aristotelian ethics.

In Udine there is a high school dedicated to him.
