= Susi Newborn =

Environmental activist (1950–2023)

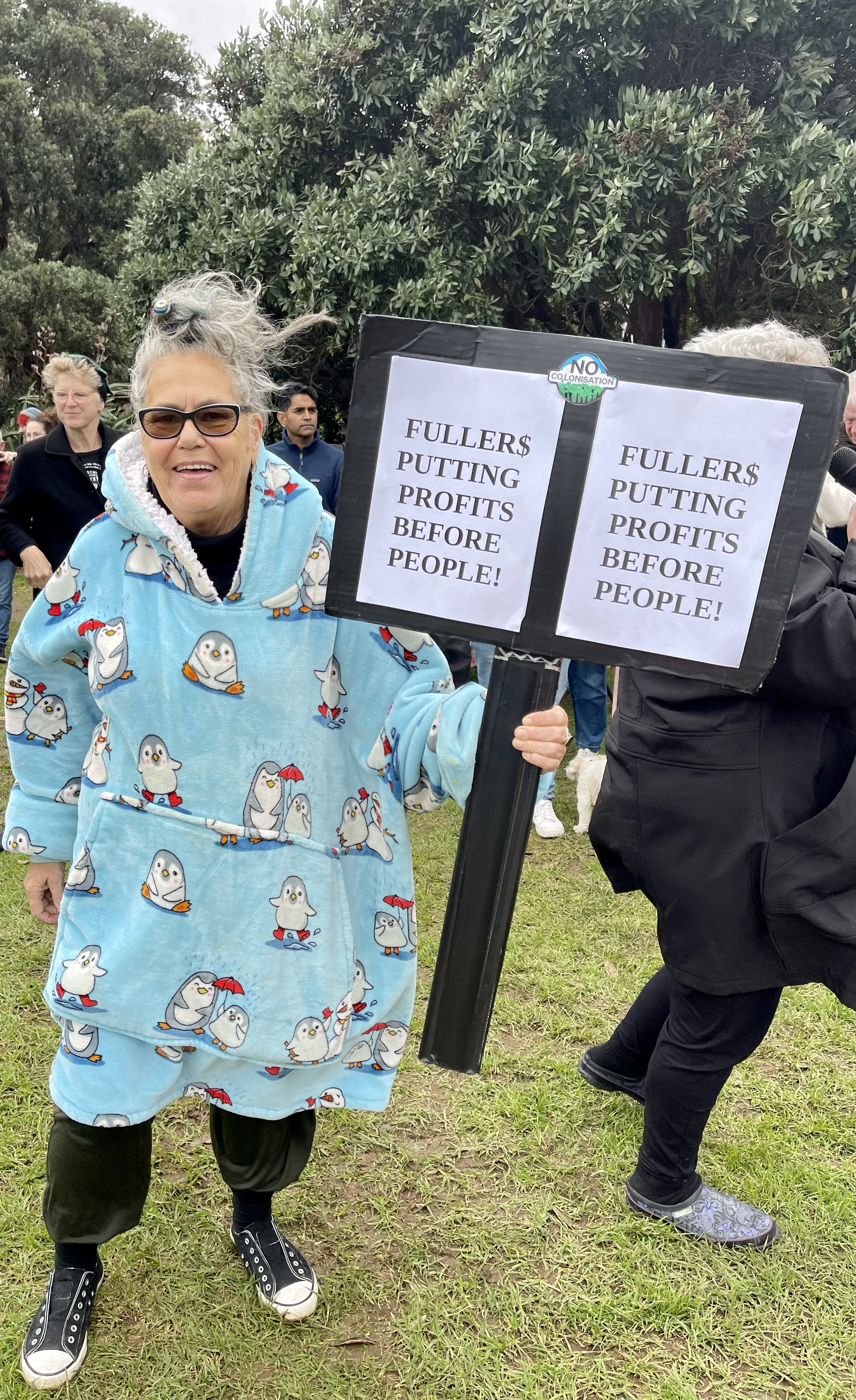
- Susi Newborn pictured protesting ferry prices on Waiheke Island New Zealand in 2023, a few months before her death.
- Born: May 20, 1950; London
- Died: December 31, 2023 (aged 73)

Susi Newborn (1950–2023) was a New Zealand author, documentary film-maker, environmental activist, a founding director of Greenpeace UK and co-founder of Greenpeace International. She was also an executive director of the New Zealand non-for-profit group Women in Film and Television.

== Early life ==
Newborn was born May 20, 1950 in London to Argentinean parents. Her first environmental protest was as a five-year-old when she successfully stopped her father from chopping down an old growth fir tree in order to let light into an otherwise gloomy living room. At 16 Newborn was expelled from the Northwood College for Girls in London, where she was boarding. She was chastised by teachers there for wearing a CND badge. Newborn went on to attend a Swiss School in Genoa, living with her parents in Italy.

== Activism and work ==
In 1970, having joined the world's first Earth Day protest in London, Newborn decided she would lead a life of activism. Her father's death in 1974, which she always felt was suspicious, added to her desire to become an environmental activist, and she became involved with Friends of the Earth in London. Her first direct action in May 1977 took place off the coast of Labrador, interfering with the Norwegian commercial seal hunt.

Newborn co-founded Greenpeace UK in 1977 having decided that the then small grassroots organization needed its own ship to be effective in campaigning against nuclear bomb tests, and the killing of whales, seals and dolphins. After her friend found an old fishing trawler being sold for scrap, Newborn led the campaign to raise the money to purchase it, and gathered friends to clean and paint it. This was the first ship that Greenpeace owned. Newborn and others named the ship the Rainbow Warrior, after the book Warriors of the Rainbow, a book by William Willoya and Vinson Brown.

Becoming disillusioned with the UK branch of Greenpeace, Newborn resigned as the British director in 1979. She moved to the United States and, in 1986, she received a degree in human ecology from the College of the Atlantic in Maine.

After the 1985 bombing in Auckland Harbour of the Rainbow Warrior by the DGSE, the French secret service, Newborn moved permanently to Aotearoa / New Zealand in 1986, where she lived on Waiheke Island starting in the late 1990s. In a 2015 interview, Newborn recalls her shock at the bombing which claimed the life of photographer Fernando Pereira. It came close to killing her first husband, Martini Gotje. "Not in a month of Sundays would I ever have expected a major European country to come in and blow up a peace boat. We must have been doing something right to upset them that much."she said.

After the bombing of the Rainbow Warrior, Newborn worked for Oxfam, for the NZ Refugee Council, in mental health and as a documentary film maker. She was also an executive director of Women in Film and Television New Zealand. Newborn was a member of the advocacy group Stand with Palestine Waiheke, which successfully petitioned the Waiheke Local Board to fly a Palestinian flag from its roof in December 2023.

In her later years Newborn campaigned for affordable housing and public transport on Waiheke. She also took part in protests to ban double-decker buses on the island, and to oppose a marina development.

== Death ==
Newborn was often seen picketing at protests on a range of issues on Waiheke, despite developing breast cancer and undergoing open heart surgery. In her later years her battle with ill health was combined with a struggle to find long-term rental housing on Waiheke Island, a tourist destination with an extreme scarcity of affordable rentals.

After being admitted to the ICU in Auckland City Hospital, Newborn died of pneumonia on December 31, 2023.

== Published works ==
- Newborn, Susi (2003), A bonfire in my mouth : life, passion and the Rainbow Warrior, HarperCollins, ISBN 978-1-86950-468-7
- Kit & Maynie: Tea, Scones and Nuclear Disarmament: a 48 minute documentary film co-directed with Claudia Pond Eyley
