= Rainbow Warrior (1957) =

1957 built ship used by Greenpeace

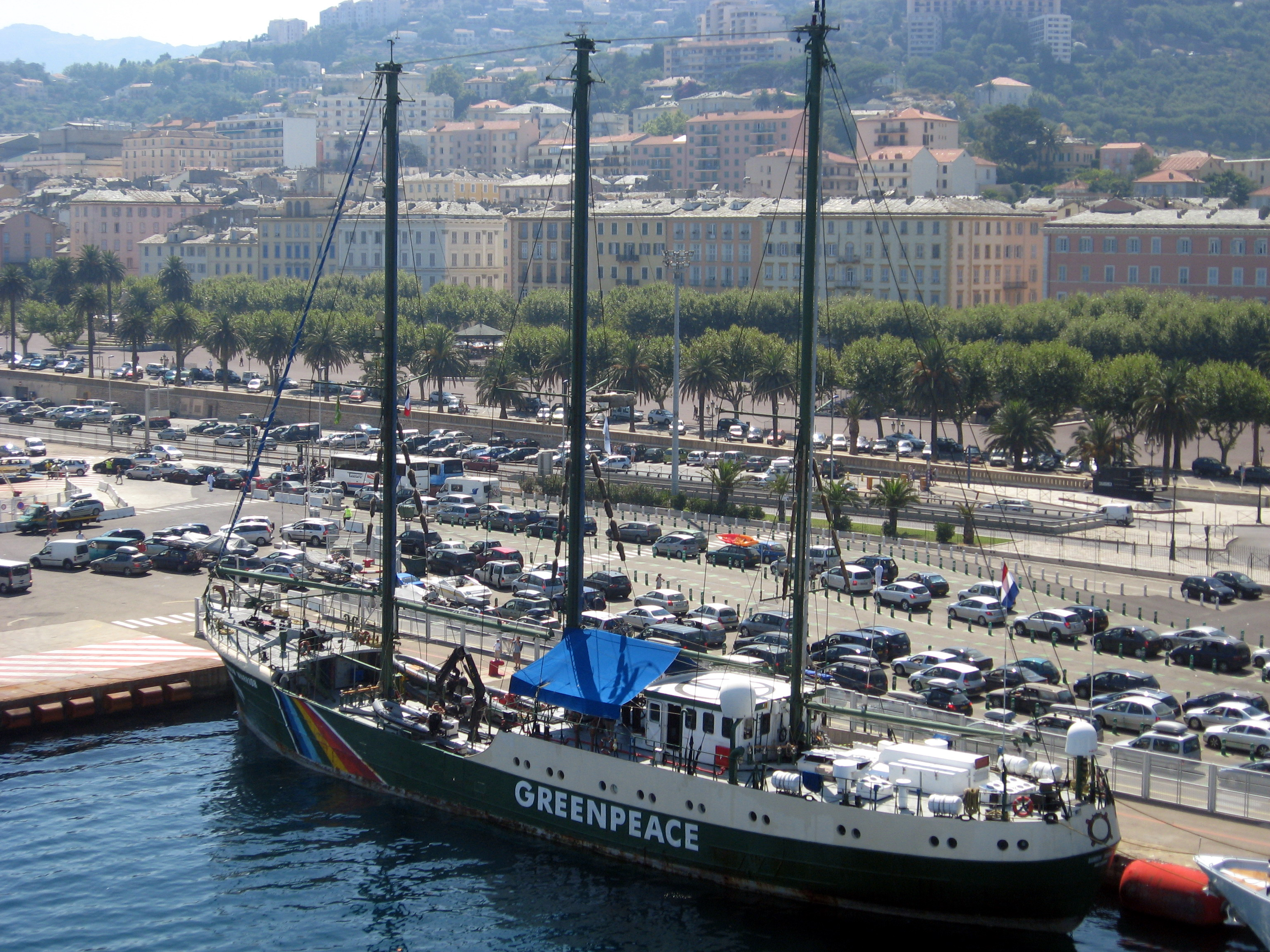
- Rainbow Warrior in port at Bastia in 2006

History
- Name: Kashmir
- Owner: Craig & Sons, Aberdeen, United Kingdom; Greenpeace (1989 – 2011), Friendship (2011 – 2018)
- Port of registry: Amsterdam, Netherlands (1989 – )
- Builder: Cochrane & Sons, Selby, United Kingdom.
- Launched: 1957
- Acquired: 1987
- Out of service: 2018
- Identification: IMO number: 5300481; MMSI number: 244535000; Call sign: PC8024
- Fate: Scrapped, 15 November 2018

General characteristics
- Class & type: Motor assisted schooner
- Tonnage: 555 GT
- Length: 55.20 m (181 ft 1 in)
- Beam: 8.54 m (28 ft 0 in)
- Draught: 4.6 m (15 ft 1 in)
- Propulsion: Two Diesel Deutz-MWM; 2 × 6 cylinder; 2 × 500 KW
- Speed: 13 knots (maximum); 10 knots (cruising)
- Range: 30 days
- Boats & landing craft carried: One Avon; Four Novurania
- Capacity: 30
- Notes: Sail area: 650 m^{2} (7,000 sq ft)

Rainbow Warrior (sometimes informally called Rainbow Warrior II) was a three-masted schooner most notable for service with the environmental protection organization Greenpeace. She replaced the original Rainbow Warrior that the French intelligence service (DGSE) bombed in 1985 in the Port of Auckland, New Zealand, which sank the ship and killed photographer Fernando Pereira.

The Rainbow Warrior II was built from the hull of the deep sea fishing ship Ross Kashmir (later Grampian Fame), which had been built by Cochrane & Sons of Selby, North Yorkshire and launched in 1957. The ship was originally 44 metres (144 ft) long and powered by steam, but was extended to 55.2 m (181 ft) in 1966. Greenpeace gave the vessel new masts, a gaff rig, a new engine and a number of environmentally low-impact systems to handle waste, heating and hot water. She was officially re-launched in Hamburg on 10 July 1989, the fourth anniversary of the bombing of her predecessor, the original Rainbow Warrior.

== History ==
Over the course of her career, Rainbow Warrior was used in activist campaigns such as blockading the Russian whaling fleet, protesting French nuclear weapons testing, and stopping ships with cargos of coal and palm oils, as well as humanitarian activities such as evacuating the inhabitants of Rongelap after the island was contaminated by nuclear testing, and providing aid after the 2004 Indian Ocean tsunami. Rainbow Warrior, piloted by skipper Mike Fincken, was docked at the Legazpi City port in Albay on 22 May 2008 for a one-month-long "Quit Coal, Save the Climate" Philippines tour and campaign aimed to educate people on the effects of the use of coal on the environment, specifically on climate change. The tour proposed alternative energy sources such as geothermal and solar energy.

Greenpeace damaged the Tubbataha Reef, a world heritage site in the Philippines, with Rainbow Warrior in 2005. Greenpeace was fined $7,000 for damaging almost 100 m^{2} (1,100 sq ft) of the coral reef. Greenpeace blamed faulty maps provided by the Philippine government for the accident. The BBC quoted Greenpeace official Red Constantino as saying "The chart indicated we were a mile and a half" from the coral reef when the ship ran aground. Greenpeace paid the fine.

== Legacy ==
Rainbow Warrior was retired in August 2011 and sold to Friendship, a Bangladesh-based NGO, to serve as a hospital ship, renamed Rongdhonu, Bengali for rainbow. She docked in the port of Chittagong on 29 August to undergo a refitting for that purpose. Rainbow Warrior III was launched in October 2011.

The NGO Friendship sold the ship for scrapping in a Bangladesh scrap yard in 2018.

== Image gallery ==
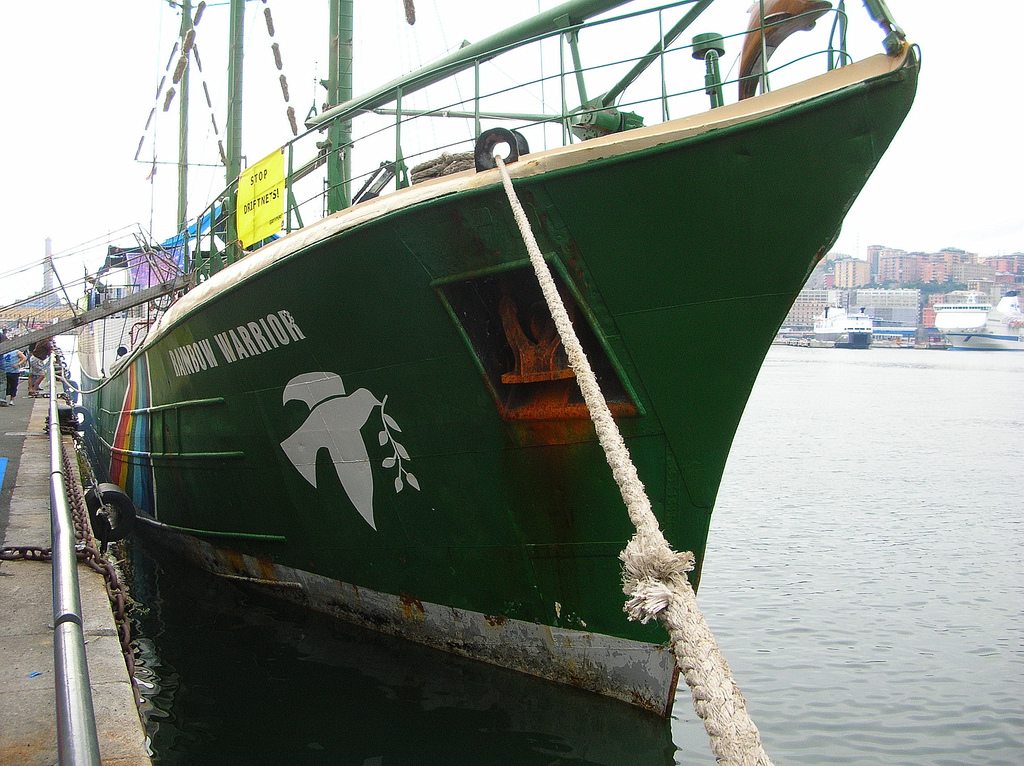
Rainbow Warrior in port at Genoa in 2007

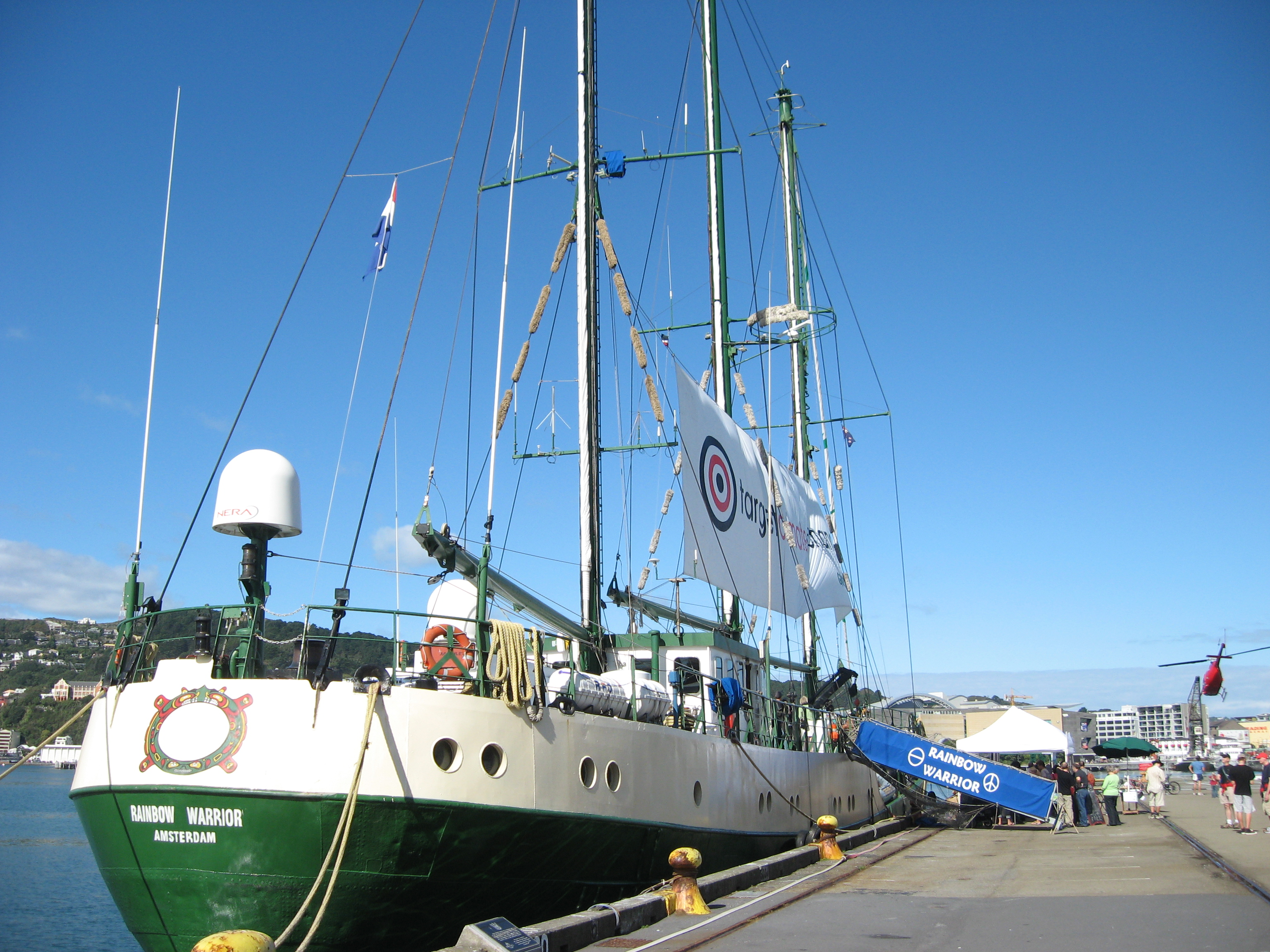
Rainbow Warrior in port at Wellington in 2008

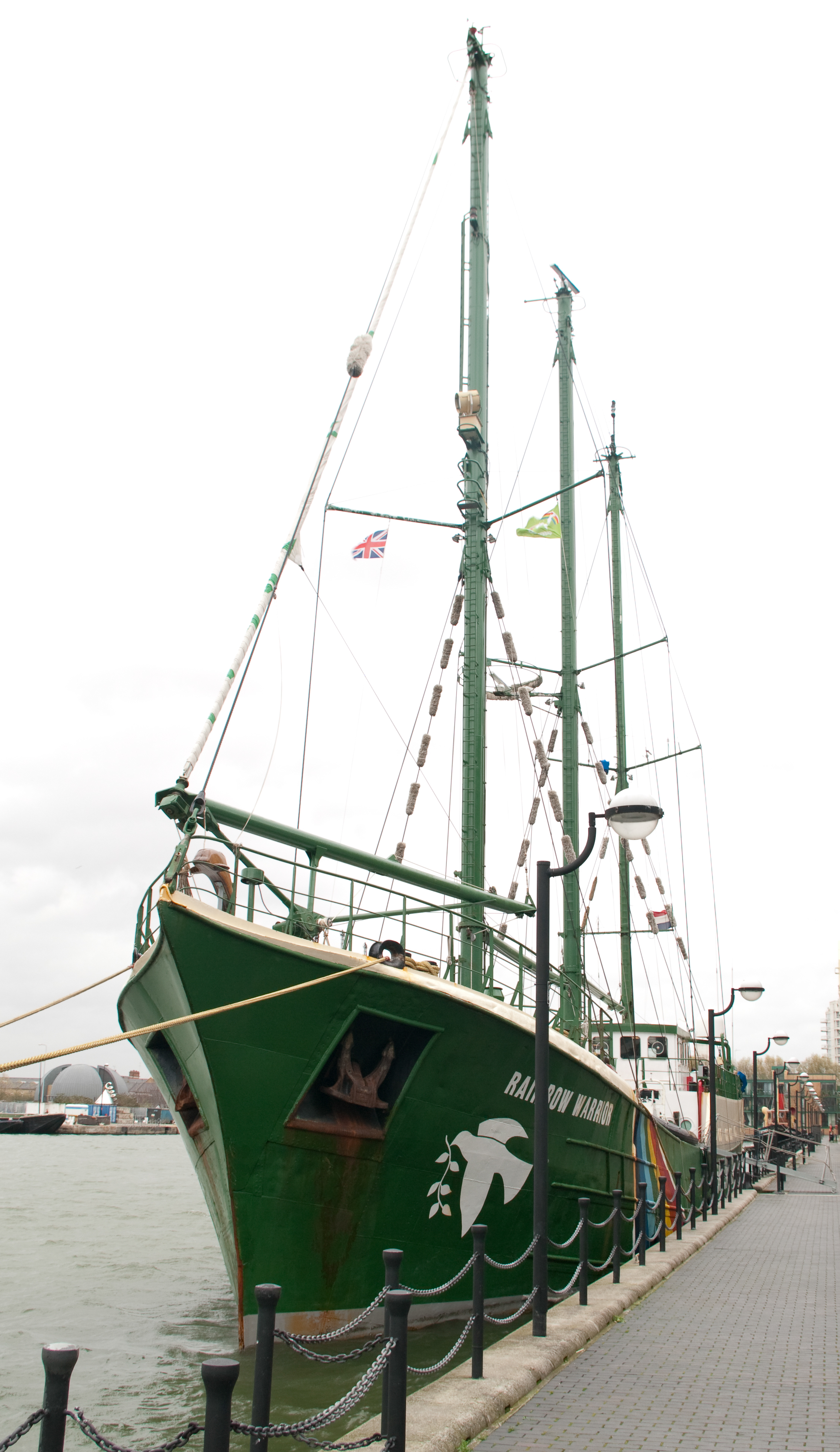
Rainbow Warrior in port at West India Docks, London in 2009

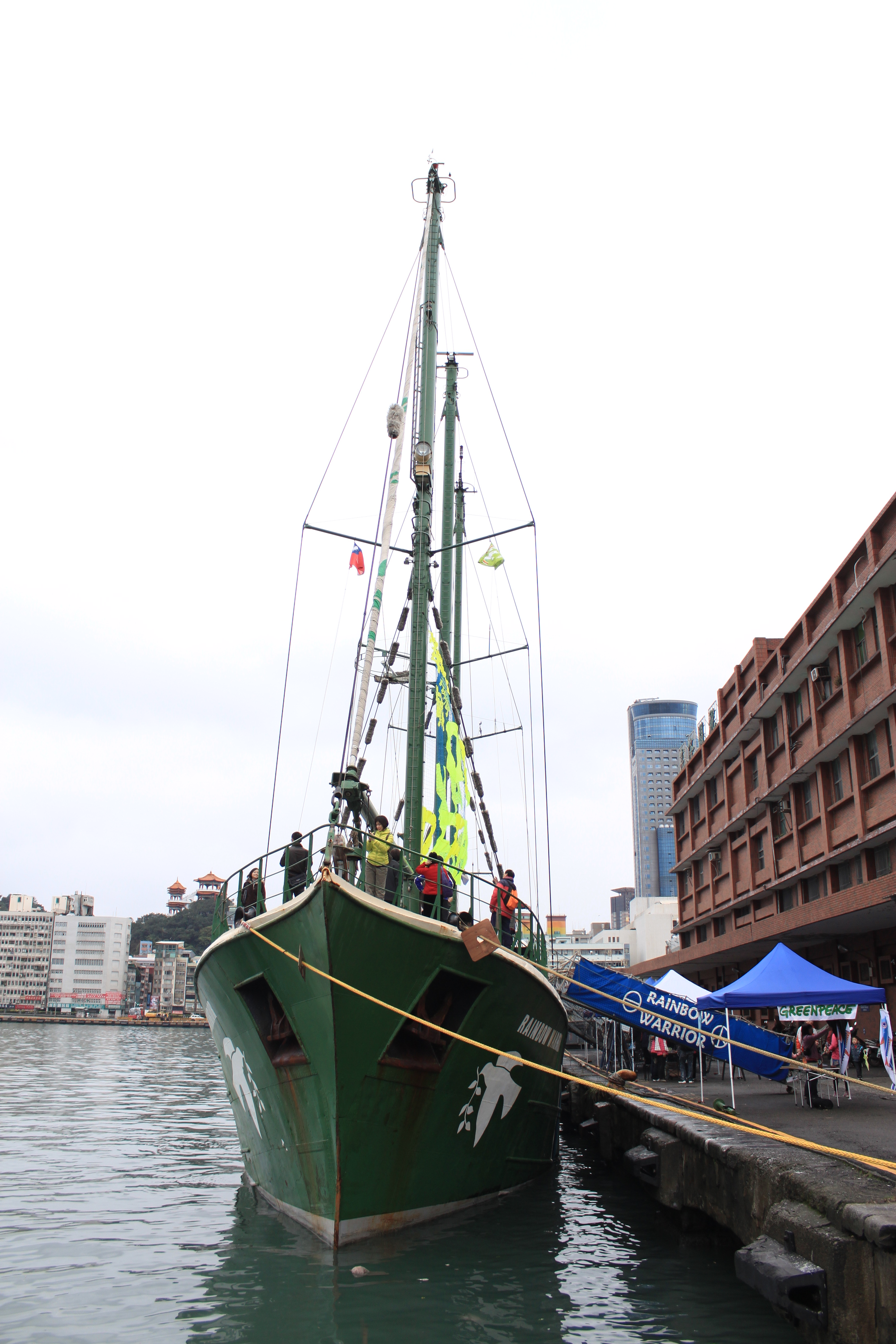
Rainbow Warrior in at Keelung, Taiwan in 2011

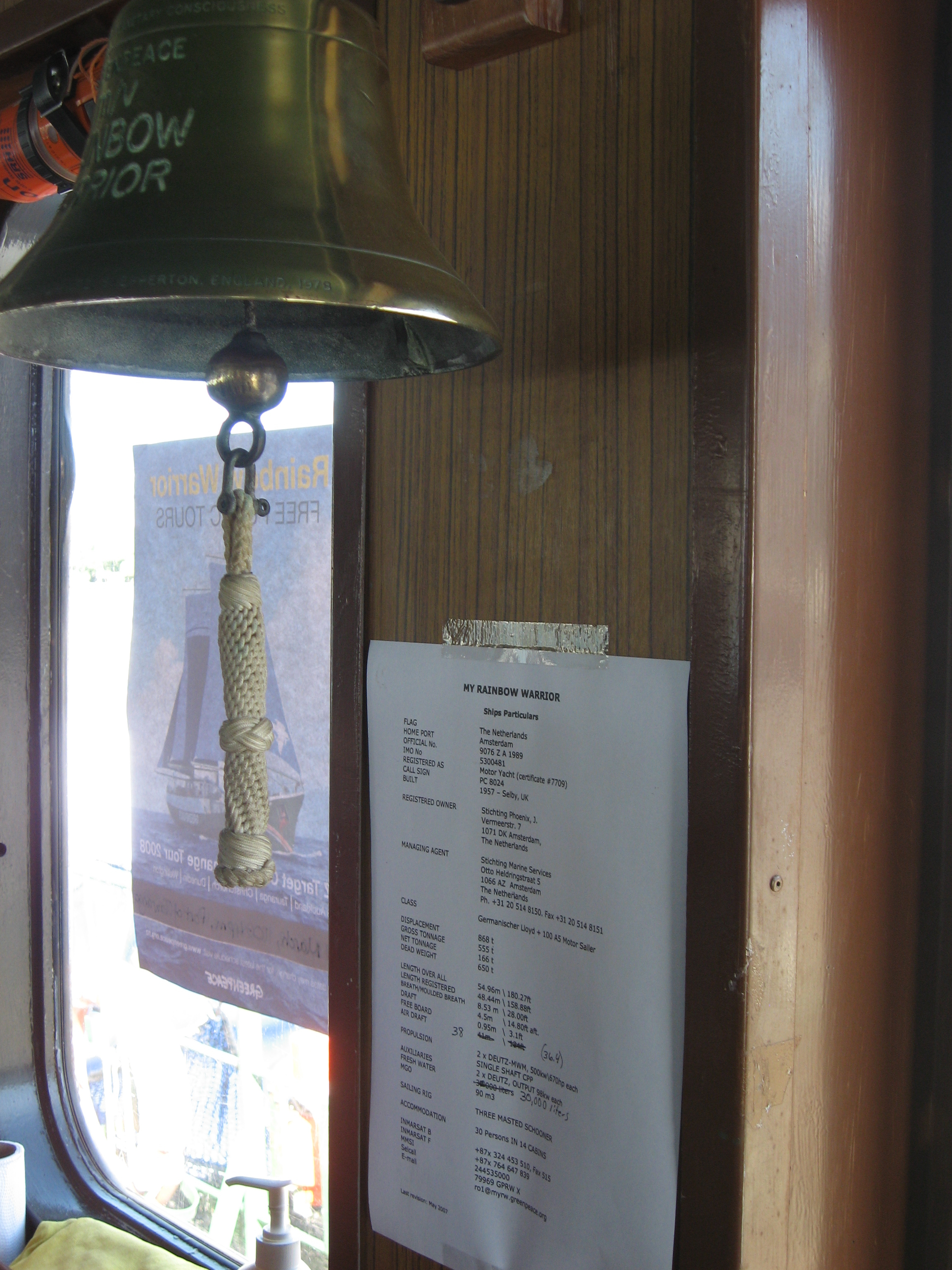
The specification.

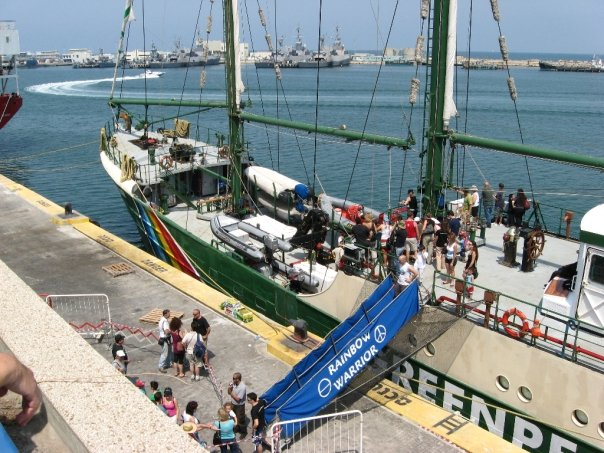
Rainbow warrior in Port of Haifa, Israel, 2008.

== See also ==
- Legend of the Rainbow Warriors
- List of schooners
- Tubbataha Reef grounding incidents
