= Niche Cocoa Company Limited =

Ghanaian cocoa company

- Founded: 2007
- Founder: Edmund Poku
- Headquarters: Ghana
- Products: Chocolate
- Website: nichecocoa.com

Niche Cocoa Company Limited is a Ghanaian cocoa company which was founded by Edmund Poku in 2007. The company exports its semi-finished by-products from Ghana to other companies in other countries internationally. Niche Cocoa started as a Commodity Processing company with three associates all from different backgrounds two years after the company was established, Poku bought all of his partners' shares making it an entirely Ghanaian owned company. In 2011, Niche Cocoa company limited was then modified into Niche Cocoa.

== Location ==
Niche Cocoa is located at the Tema free zones enclave at Tema industrial area off the Aflao road, which is some few kilometers to Ghana's capital city Accra.

== Founder ==
Edmund Poku founded Niche Cocoa in 2007 after his MBA project work at Columbia Business School. After listening to his professor, he knew he will not be able to raise a capital of $12 million to start up. So Mr.Edmund Poku came to Ghana to raise that funds and out of $12 million, he was able to raise $4 million, which $2 million out of the $4 million was from his trust bank and the other $2 million was equity.

== Production ==
The company's production is not the only objective, although Niche Cocoa has prioritized sustainability and the ongoing support for the country's cocoa farmers. Niche actively supports cocoa farmers in Ghana through an agreement which has two co-adjutants to purchase certified beans. Niche Cocoa has contributed to the Ghanaian economy by being one of two local value added business to the cocoa sector of Ghana,Ghana the second-largest producer of cocoa beans in the world.

In October 2022, Niche Cocoa announced the plan to open a cocoa processing plant with Omanhene Cocoa Bean Company in Franklin, Milwaukee County, Wisconsin.

== Encroachments ==
Niche Cocoa is a free zone company in Ghana whereby the challenges have not been many and during the electricity crisis in Ghana, Niche Cocoa was hardly seen off the national grid. The only fear of Niche Cocoa is that a creamy milk market could take advantage of the archaic sweetmeats sector of the cocoa processing companies but this is non-existent and the few available are more expensive than the imported ones which Niche bewail.

== Awards ==
Niche Cocoa has been awarded by the Ghanaian President's National Awards for Export Achievement as Exporter of The Year 2015.
