= Rainbow Warrior (2011) =

Sailing yacht owned and operated by Greenpeace

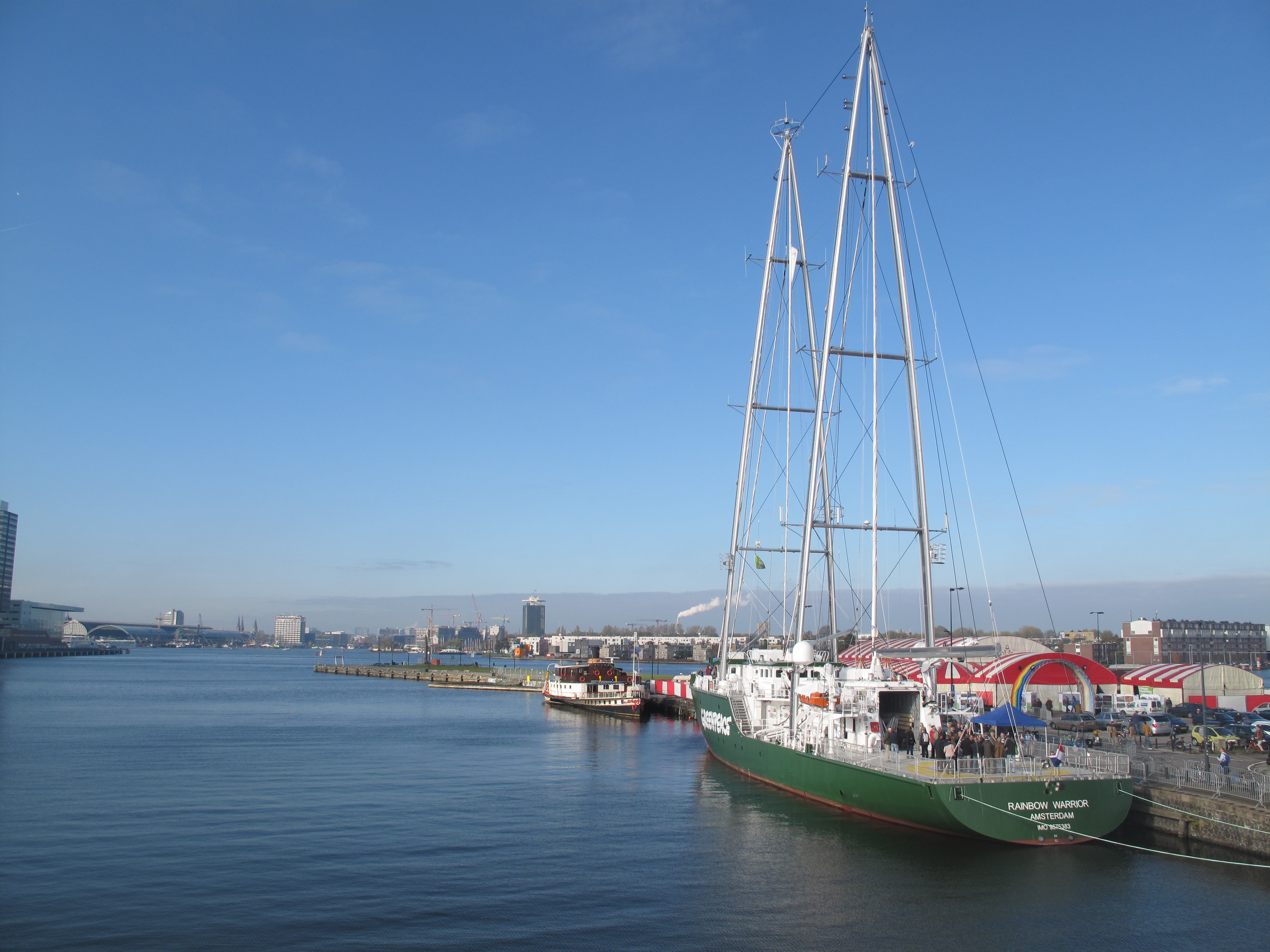
- Rainbow Warrior in the Port of Amsterdam in 2011

History

Netherlands
- Name: Rainbow Warrior
- Owner: Greenpeace
- Port of registry: Amsterdam, Netherlands
- Ordered: July 2009
- Builder: Fassmer, Berne, Germany
- Cost: €22.5m
- Launched: October 2011
- Christened: October 2011
- Completed: October 2011
- Identification: IMO number: 9575383
- Status: In service

General characteristics
- Class & type: Motor assisted yacht
- Tonnage: approximately 855 GT
- Length: 61.34 m (201 ft 3 in) oa
- Beam: 11.30 m (37 ft 1 in)
- Height: 54.25 m (178 ft 0 in) (air draft)
- Draught: 5.15 m (16 ft 11 in)
- Propulsion: Sail with diesel-electric backup
- Speed: 15 kts
- Capacity: 30 persons
- Notes: Sail area: 1,255 m^{2} (13,500 sq. ft.), Helipad

Rainbow Warrior (sometimes Rainbow Warrior III) is a purpose-built motor-assisted sailing yacht owned and operated by Greenpeace and intended for use in their activities such as environmental protests and scientific excursions. She was christened on October 14, 2011, replacing Rainbow Warrior II after further upgrades and maintenance to the older ship had been shown to be impractical.

The vessel is the first Rainbow Warrior that was not converted from another vessel. Her hull was constructed in Poland and she was fitted out in Germany. She has state-of-the-art facilities including advanced telecommunication equipment, specialised scientific equipment, and a helicopter landing pad. The ship is also designed to be one of the "greenest" ships afloat and, to showcase this quality, it runs primarily using wind power, with a 55 metres (180 ft) mast system which carries 1255 m^{2} (13,500 sq. ft.) of sail. The ship also has Volvo Penta D65A MT 1850 HP diesel-electric engine and carries up to 110,000 litres (25,000 imp. gal.; 30,000 US gal.) diesel fuel. The ship can store up to 59 m^{3} (77 cu. yd.) of greywater and blackwater, avoiding the need for disposal at sea. All materials, from the paintwork to the insulation, were chosen with a view to sustainability, and each component has been supplied with transparent ethical sourcing.

== Construction and crowdfunding ==
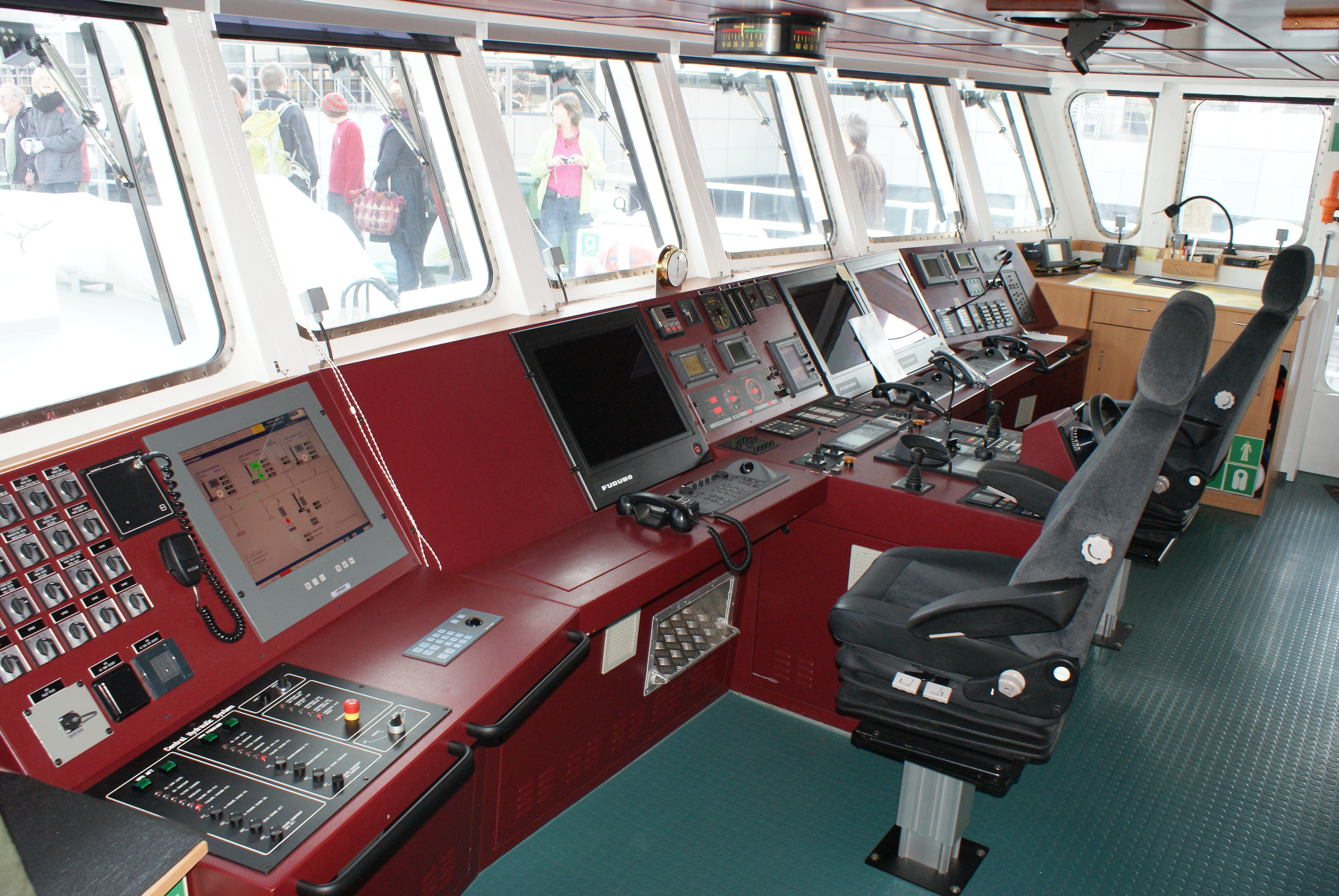
On the bridge

Construction of the ship began in the summer of 2010 in Gdańsk before being transported to the Fassmer Shipyard near Bremen in Germany to be fitted out before being launched in October 2011. The ship was in part funded by a crowd funding project set up by Greenpeace. Supporters were encouraged to buy parts of the ship through a specifically designed website. Supporters in turn received a certificate for their contribution and had their names etched onto a digital artwork on board the vessel. The website live-streamed names and messages, tying people directly to the part of the ship they contributed to. The multimedia site was also accompanied by a webcam allowing people to follow the ship's construction up to its launch date. The project received over 100,000 donors from around the world.

== First tour ==
After its launch in Bremerhaven, Germany, the new Rainbow Warrior toured ports in Europe (Hamburg, Amsterdam, London, Stockholm and Barcelona) welcoming supporters on board the new ship and holding specific events such as onboard concerts. The ship was also visited by celebrity supporters such as Radiohead's Thom Yorke, who was part of the ship's maiden voyage, and Michelin two-starred chef Diego Guerrero in Barcelona. In January 2012, the ship travelled to the East Coast of the US, planning to dock at New York City, Baltimore, Southport, North Carolina, Fort Lauderdale and St. Petersburg, Florida. In March 2013, the ship travelled to Australia.

== See also ==
- Rainbow Warrior (1955)
- Rainbow Warrior (1957)
- Arctic Sunrise
- Esperanza
- Siriu
- Legend of the Rainbow Warriors
