= De ortu et progressu morum =

Book by Jacopo Stellini

- Author: Jacopo Stellini
- Original title: De ortu et progressu morum atque opinionum ad more pertinentium
- Language: Latin
- Genre: Essay
- Published: 1740
- Publication place: Italy

De ortu et progressu morum, or De ortu et progressu morum atque opinionum ad more pertinentium (About the origin and progress of customs and of opinions about customs), is an essay written in 1740 by Jacopo Stellini. Cesare Beccaria liked it very much.
