= Liceo Classico Jacopo Stellini =

Coordinates: 46.0663°N 13.2394°E

Liceo Classico statale Jacopo Stellini is a liceo classico in Udine, Italy, for pupils aged 14 to 19. The high school was founded in 1808, making it the oldest liceo classico in Udine. During World War I, Luigi Cadorna placed the headquarters of the Italian Army in the part of the school that had just been built in 1915, and after the war the liceo moved to its present location.

== Teaching ==
The subjects that are studied in most depth are classical studies (Latin language and literature and ancient Greek Language and literature) and humanities (history, philosophy and Italian literature), though in recent years subjects like English language, science and mathematics have been increasing in importance.

== The library ==
Liceo Stellini's library is very prestigious: it contains two manuscripts from the 15th century, twelve incunables and hundreds of books from the 16th to 19th centuries.

== Notable teachers and students ==
- Elio Bartolini, writer and poet
- Giuseppe Battiston, actor
- Lodovico di Caporiacco, scientist and political scientist
- Ardito Desio, geologist and explorer
- Mauro Ferrari, scientist
- Egidio Feruglio, explorer, naturalist and geologist
- Loris Fortuna, politician and partisan
- Massimo Giacomini, football player and manager
- Paolo Moreno, historian
- Gaetano Perusini, neurologist
- Giandomenico Picco, UN deputy secretary
- Bruno Pizzul, football player and journalist

== Bibliography ==
- Federico Vicario, Il liceo classico Jacopo Stellini: duecento anni nel cuore del Friuli, Udine, Forum Edizioni, 2010, ISBN 978-88-8420-586-5 (in Italian)
