= World Affairs Seminar =

Annual student leadership conference

World Affairs Seminar (WAS) is an annual week-long international student leadership conference that takes place in June. The program, whose theme changes each year, discusses the ways in which young leaders can promote change and become involved in finding solutions to current world issues. This event's audience mainly consists of students aged 15–18 within the United States, Canada, and other countries around the world. These students are considered delegates of their area. Through keynote speeches, the conference has provided students with exposure to professionals from government, international organizations, media, and business.

== History ==
The World Affairs Seminar was founded in 1977 by professors Gaylon Greenhill and Dale Brock. Brock became the first WAS General Manager. In 2017, its fortieth year, students from 35 countries attended.

== Themes ==
WAS has covered topics including human rights, nuclear arms control and disarmament, economics, environmental issues, global health, globalization, security, and global leadership, with an emphasis on ways that students can make a difference in their communities and beyond.

- World Affairs Seminar 2002 (26th) - "Is Peace Possible in an Age of Global Terror?"
- World Affairs Seminar 2003 (27th) - "Making Peace: Managing Conflict"
- World Affairs Seminar 2004 (28th) - "Making Peace by Understanding Conflict"
- World Affairs Seminar 2005 (29th) - "Globalisation and Tradition: Two Roads Diverge?"
- World Affairs Seminar 2006 (30th) - "Global Leadership Rising Powers: Who Counts?"
- World Affairs Seminar 2007 (31st) - "Global Health: Bridging the Divides"
- World Affairs Seminar 2009 (32nd) - "World Hunger: Ethical Dilemma of Our Time"
- World Affairs Seminar 2010 (33rd) - "The Global Fresh Water Challenge"
- World Affairs Seminar 2011 (34th) - "Sustainable Development"
- World Affairs Seminar 2012 (35th) - "Global Communication 2.0: Technology's Impact on International Understanding"
- World Affairs Seminar 2013 (36th) - "Gender Equity/Social Justice: Moral Imperative of our Time"
- World Affairs Seminar 2014 (37th) - "World Health: Issues & Responsibilities"
- World Affairs Seminar 2015 (38th) - "Global Energy: Who's Got the Power?"
- World Affairs Seminar 2016 (39th) - "Water: A Global Resource to Share and Protect"
- World Affairs Seminar 2017 (40th) - "Education and Social Justice"
- World Affairs Seminar 2018 (41st) - "Innovation: Shaping the World You Will Inherit"
- World Affairs Seminar 2019 (42nd) - "The Promise & Perils of Social Media"
- World Affairs Seminar 2020 (43rd) - "Hunger in a World of Plenty" [Virtual]
- World Affairs Seminar 2021 (44th) - "Cities: Urban Life in a Changing World" [Virtual]
- World Affairs Seminar 2022 (45th) - "Reimagining Global Health and Wellness: Contagious Ideas" [Virtual]
- World Affairs Seminar 2023 (46th) - "Climate Change: Youth Take Action"
- World Affairs Seminar 2024 (47th) - "Democracy and Governance: Evolving Global Perspective"

== Past keynote speakers ==
- Dr. Magda Peck - Dean, UW Milwaukee School of Public Health
- Will Allen - Former Professional Basketball Player/head of "Growing Power"
- Peter Anin – Author of The Great Lakes Water Wars
- Dr. Stephen Hargarten - Chair, Medical College of Wisconsin World Health Program
- Peter Sawyer - Pulitzer Foundation
- Fred de Sam Lazaro - PBS NewsHour Correspondent
- Vice Admiral Ann Rondeau - IBM Corporation, former Dean, National Defense University
- Peter Menzel & Faith D’Aluisio - Authors of “The Hungry Planet”
- Dr. Oscar Arias - former President of Costa Rica and Nobel Prize Winner
- Dr. Akbar S. Ahmed - Ibn Khaladun Chair of Islamic Studies, American University
- Eric Plantenberg - President, Freedom Personal Development
- Wendy Baumann - President, Wisconsin Women's Business Initiative Corp
- RADM David P. Aucoin - USN Director, Programming Division, US Navy
- Sahar Maher El-Issawi – Egyptian journalist & Blogger
- Geneva Bolton Johnson - Retired President, Family Service America
- Dr. Cary Silverstein - International Organizational Consultant
- Jay Burdette - Sears China Division
- Dith Pran - New York Times photojournalist
- Dr. William Schultz - Executive Director, Amnesty International
- Elaine Chao - Distinguished Fellow, The Heritage Foundation, Washington D.C.
- Jean-Michel Cousteau - France, Environmentalist
- Jeane Kirkpatrick - Former U.S. Ambassador to the UN & Cabinet Member
- Giandomenico Picco - Former Assistant Secretary-General of the United Nations
- Evan Thomas - Assistant Managing Editor, Newsweek Magazine

== Sponsors ==
Rotary District 6270 economically assists students who have shown leadership in their community, exceptional work in their school studies, and dedication in helping their communities.

Other organizations that sponsor students include: Lion's Club, local school districts, Kiwanis, and Optimist Clubs
