= Rainbow Warrior (1955) =

Greenpeace vessel bombed by French intelligence operatives in Auckland harbour (1985)

Coordinates: 34.9748°S 173.9349°E

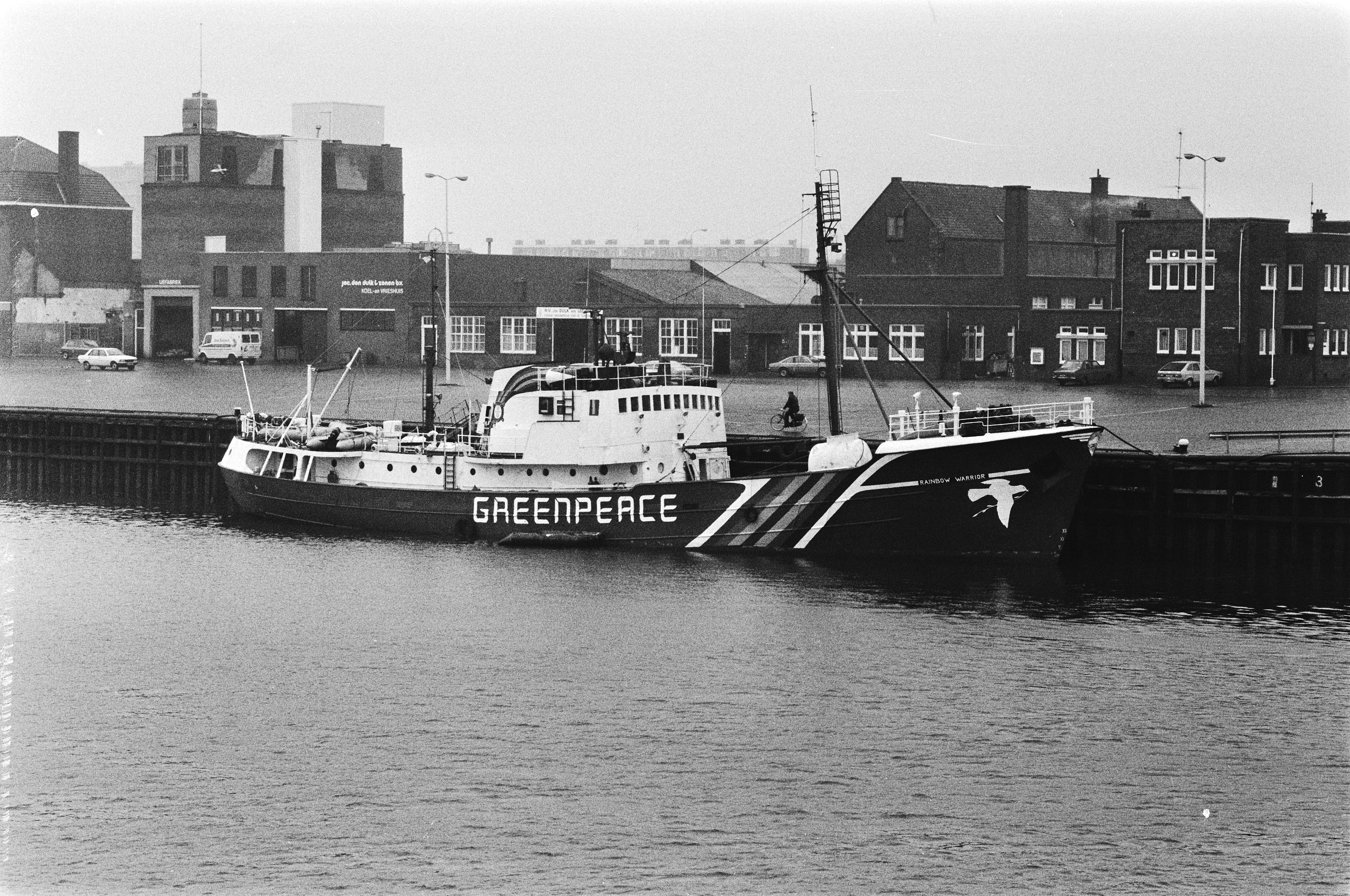
- Rainbow Warrior docked in 1979.

History
- Name: Sir William Hardy (1955–1977); Rainbow Warrior (1978–1985)
- Owner: United Kingdom Ministry of Agriculture, Fisheries and Food (1955–1977); Greenpeace (1978–1985)
- Operator: Greenpeace (1978–1985)
- Port of registry: Aberdeen, United Kingdom
- Builder: Hall, Russell & Company, Aberdeen, UK
- Yard number: 846
- Launched: 29 November 1954
- Acquired: 1977
- Identification: IMO number: 5329786
- Fate: Sunk 10 July 1985; Refloated 21 August 1985; Scuttled 12 December 1987

General characteristics
- Class & type: Trawler
- Tonnage: 418 GT
- Length: 40 m (131 ft 3 in)
- Draught: 4.6 m
- Propulsion: 2 engines, 620 m² of sails
- Speed: 12 knots (engines); 5–7 knots (sail)

Rainbow Warrior was a Greenpeace ship involved in campaigns against whaling, seal hunting, nuclear testing and nuclear waste dumping during the late 1970s and early 1980s. The Direction Générale de la Sécurité Extérieure (the French intelligence service) bombed Rainbow Warrior in the Port of Auckland, New Zealand on 10 July 1985, sinking the ship and killing photographer Fernando Pereira.

== History ==
Rainbow Warrior was commissioned by the UK Ministry of Agriculture, Fisheries and Food (MAFF) as a trawler called Sir William Hardy. It was built in 1955, in Aberdeen, Scotland. It was later purchased by the environmental organization Greenpeace UK.

== With Greenpeace ==
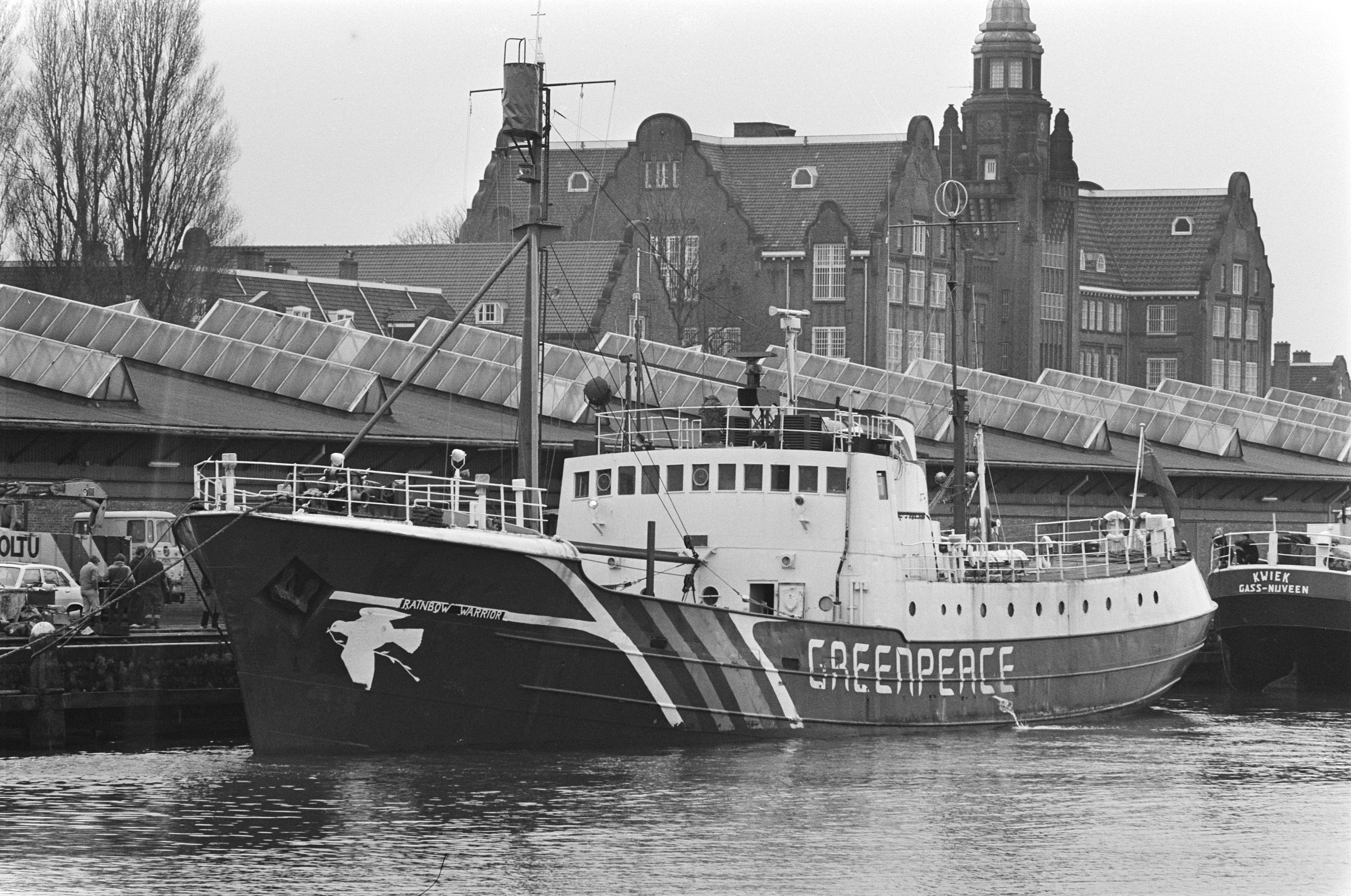
Rainbow Warrior (Amsterdam, 1981)

In 1977 the ship was acquired by Greenpeace UK at a cost of £37,000 and underwent a four-month refit. It was re-launched on 2 May 1978 as Rainbow Warrior. The ship was named by Greenpeace co-founder Susi Newborn after the book Warriors of the Rainbow which she had been given by another Greenpeace co-founder, Robert Hunter. After a series of high-profile campaigns in the North Atlantic, including two escapes from captivity in Spain resulting in the resignation of the Admiral of the Spanish Navy, Rainbow Warrior made its way to North America where it underwent modification in 1981 and the fitting of sails in a ketch rig in 1985.

In early 1985, Rainbow Warrior was in the Pacific Ocean campaigning against nuclear testing. In May, it relocated 300 Marshall Islanders from Rongelap Atoll, which had been polluted by radioactive fallout from past American nuclear tests at the Pacific Proving Grounds.

It then travelled to New Zealand to lead a flotilla of yachts protesting against French nuclear testing at the Mururoa Atoll in the Tuamotu Archipelago of French Polynesia. During previous nuclear tests at Mururoa, protest ships had been boarded by French commandos after sailing into the shipping exclusion zone around the atoll. For the 1985 tests, Greenpeace intended to monitor the impact of nuclear tests and place protesters on the island to monitor the blasts.

DGSE agent Christine Cabon infiltrated the Auckland offices of the organisation and secretly monitored communications from Rainbow Warrior, collected maps, and investigated underwater equipment. French agents posing as interested supporters or tourists also toured the ship while it was open to public viewing.

=== Bombing of Rainbow Warrior ===
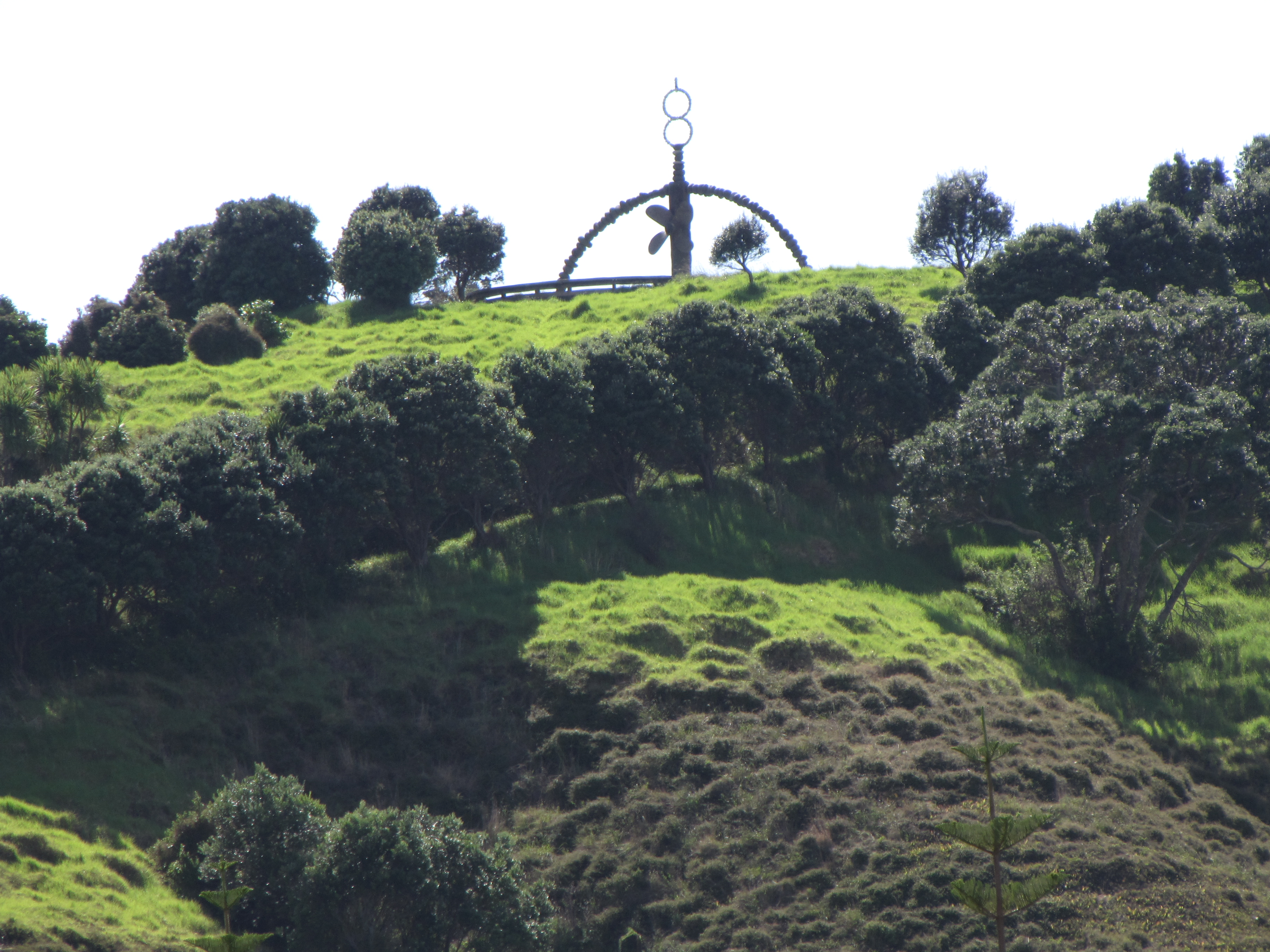
Memorial to Rainbow Warrior at Matauri Bay, Northland

Rainbow Warrior, then captained by Peter Willcox, was sabotaged and sunk just before midnight NZST on 10 July 1985, by two explosive devices attached to the hull by operatives of the French intelligence service (DGSE). One of the twelve people on board, photographer Fernando Pereira, returned to the ship after the first explosion to attempt to retrieve his equipment, and was killed when the ship was sunk by the second, larger explosion.

A homicide inquiry began after the arrests of two French agents. The revelations of French involvement caused a political scandal and the French Minister of Defence Charles Hernu resigned. The captured French agents were imprisoned, but later transferred to French custody. They were confined to the French military base on the Island of Hao for a brief period before being released. After facing international pressure, France agreed to pay compensation to Greenpeace, and later admissions from the former head of the DGSE revealed that three teams had carried out the bombings. In addition to those successfully prosecuted, two DGSE divers, Jacques Camurier and Alain Tonel, had carried out the actual bombing, but their identities have never been officially confirmed. On 22 September 1985, the French Prime Minister Laurent Fabius summoned journalists to his office to read a 200-word statement in which he said: "The truth is cruel," and acknowledged there had been a cover-up, he went on to say that "Agents of the French secret service sank this boat. They were acting on orders."

Following the sinking, Greenpeace and the French Republic entered into an agreement to submit Greenpeace's claims against France to international arbitration. The arbitral tribunal, seated in Geneva, Switzerland, was composed of three members (Professor Claude Reymond, Sir Owen Woodhouse and Professor François Terre) and rendered an award in 1987 in favour of Greenpeace, ordering France to pay it US$8.1 million. David McTaggart, Greenpeace's chairman, described the award as "a great victory for those who support the right of peaceful protest and abhor the use of violence." Greenpeace was represented by Lloyd Cutler and Gary Born of Wilmer Cutler & Pickering.

The wreck of Rainbow Warrior was refloated on 21 August 1985 and moved to a naval harbour for forensic examination. Although the hull had been recovered, the damage was too extensive for repair and the vessel was scuttled in Matauri Bay in the Cavalli Islands, New Zealand, on 12 December 1987, to serve as a dive wreck and artificial reef to promote marine life. The hull is now covered with a large colony of varicoloured sea anemones. The masts were salvaged and now stand outside the Dargaville Museum. A second ship, also named Rainbow Warrior, was acquired in 1989 whilst a third ship of the same name was built from scratch and launched in October 2011.

== Literature ==
Several books have been written about both the history of Greenpeace and the genesis of Rainbow Warrior. A Bonfire in my Mouth: Life, Passion and the Rainbow Warrior by Susi Newborn was published in 2003 and Rex Wyler's Greenpeace: An Insider's Account. How a Group of Ecologists, Journalists and Visionaries Changed the World in 2004. In 2014, Pete Wilkinson's book From Deptford to Antarctica – The Long Way Home was published.

Books that have been published about the bombing of Rainbow Warrior include Eyes of Fire: The Last Voyage of the Rainbow Warrior, which was produced the year after the sinking and written by shipboard author David Robie.

Books in French include L'affaire Greenpeace, in Les grands énigmes de notre temps, Jacques Derogy, Éditions de Cremille, Geneva, 1990, which notes (at p. 82) that the affair cost France 115 million francs, in addition to being the most serious scandal during the Mitterrand presidency.

== In popular culture ==
Documentaries made about Rainbow Warrior include The Rainbow Warriors of Waiheke Island (2009), Departure and Return (2006) and The Women who Launched the Rainbow (2005).

Several fictionalised films have also been made about the ship, including The Rainbow Warrior Conspiracy (1989), The Rainbow Warrior (1992), two French films Opération Rainbow Warrior and Le Rainbow Warrior (both 2006), and Bombshell (2016). The Steven Seagal-directed On Deadly Ground, an action film inspired by Greenpeace's activities, had the working title Rainbow Warrior.

Musicians and bands who have referenced the original Rainbow Warrior and the sinking, include the Danish/American band White Lion and their song "Little Fighter", Australian band Midnight Oil, Belgian band Cobalt 60, the New Zealand band The Bats ("Green" on Silverbeet), the Irish folk-rock singer Luka Bloom, the Faroese metal band Týr, and the Argentinian metal band Rata Blanca. Geffen Records released a double album, Greenpeace Rainbow Warriors, in 1989 and included songs from artists such as U2, INXS, The Pretenders, Talking Heads, Peter Gabriel, and White Lion. German punk band Die Toten Hosen also referenced the sinking in their song "Walkampf", although not by name.

"Anchor Me" is a 1994 single by New Zealand rock band The Mutton Birds which a charity supergroup of New Zealand artists recorded in 2005 to commemorate the 20th anniversary of the bombing of the Rainbow Warrior. The song peaked at #3 in the New Zealand singles chart.

A Greenpeace Rainbow Warrior benefit concert was held on 5 April 1986 at Mt. Smart Stadium, Auckland, including Herbs, Neil Young, Jackson Browne, Graham Nash, Topp Twins, Dave Dobbyn and a Split Enz reunion. In 2013 the Rainbow Warrior travelled the islands of Indonesia with elders of the Mentawi Islands, the visit included a stop on the island of Bali where popular independent rock band Navicula filmed their hit song Busur Hujan. The video filmed by Erick Est included footage from the history of Greenpeace and the original Rainbow Warrior. The video, shared on YouTube, brought the story of the Rainbow Warrior into the popular culture of Indonesia's youth movement.

Rainbow Quay in Rotherhithe, London, is named after the vessel, which was moored in this part of the Greenland dock prior to the development of residential flats also named Rainbow Quay.

'Murder in the Pacific' is a three-part documentary about the sinking of the ship, directed by Chloe Campbell. It was broadcast on BBC2 in March 2023.

== See also ==
- Rainbow Warrior (1957), auxiliary 3-mast schooner, acquired by Greenpeace in 1989
- Rainbow Warrior (2011), purpose-designed Greenpeace ship
