= Nell Island =

Island of Kwajalein atoll, Marshall Islands

Coordinates: 9°06′31″N 167°19′26″E

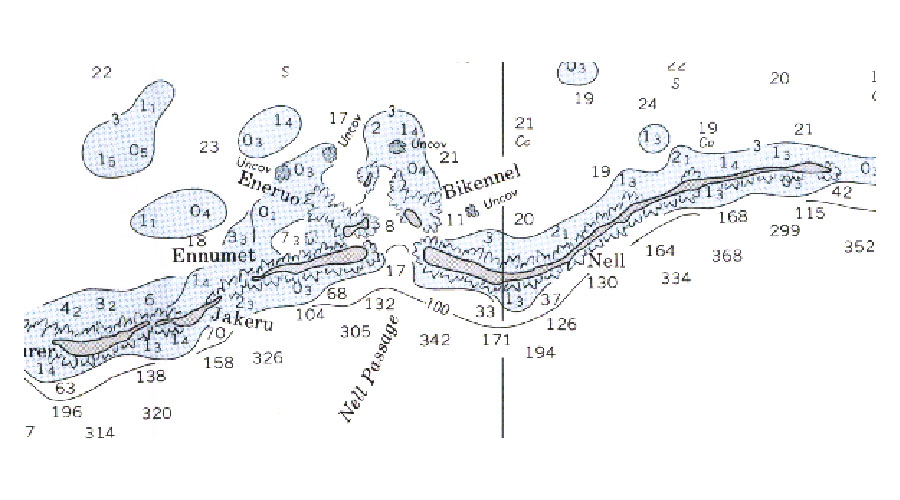
Mapping Agency Chart

Nell Island (Marshallese: Nōļ, [nʲʌlˠ]) is part of Kwajalein Atoll in the Ralik Chain in the Republic of the Marshall Islands (RMI), 2,100 nautical miles (3900 km) southwest of Honolulu, Hawaii. It lies at a convergence of deep, narrow, protected channels and small islands.
