= Álvaro de Saavedra Cerón =

Spanish conquistador

Route of Saavedra's travel.

Álvaro de Saavedra (died 1529), fully Álvaro de Saavedra Cerón, was one of the Spanish explorers of the Pacific Ocean.

== Life ==
=== Early life ===
The exact date and place of his birth are unknown, but he was born in the late 15th century or early 16th century in Spain. Hernán Cortés was his relative, whom he accompanied to Mexico (New Spain) in 1526.

=== 1527 expedition ===
In 1527, Hernán Cortés prepared a new expedition to search for the missing fleet of the Loaísa expedition and commissioned his cousin Álvaro to command the new expedition. However, the true purpose of the expedition was to find new lands in the South Sea (Pacific Ocean) and to bring back spice plants.

On 31 October 1527, they sailed from Zihuatanejo, Guerrero. On 15 December, after having sailed 1,170 leagues (roughly 3,000 miles or 4,890 km), the Espiritu Santo and the Santiago swept on ahead, after a sudden squall, never to be heard of again. On 29 December, the La Florida sighted the Utirik-Toke atoll complexes On 1 January 1528, the Rongelap-Ailinginae Atolls, both in the Marshall Islands, which were jointly charted as "Islas de los Reyes" (Islands of the Kings, referring to the Three Wise Kings due to the proximity to the festivity of Epiphany). On 2 February 1528, the "La Florida" sighted the Philippines and the following day anchored at a small island off the north coast of Mindanao, after 95 days since its departure and having sailed 1923 leagues.

On 30 March 1528, the "La Florida" arrived to Tidore, the Spanish stronghold in the Moluccas where the men remaining from the Loaisa expedition were found, and they joined them to fight the Portuguese in the neighbouring Ternate.

To carry out the instructions of the expedition and bring further assistance to the Spaniards in Tidore, Saavedra set sail for New Spain on 14 June 1528. On 24 June 1528, the "La Florida" discovered the Schouten Islands and landed on Yapen. These were charted respectively as "Islas de Oro" (Golden Islands) and "Payne" Island. They continued coasting western New Guinea until discovering the Admiralty Islands on 15 August. Landing on Manus Island, they charted it as "Urays La Grande" (Urays the Big). They then sailed north and discovered the Nomoi Islands in the Carolines. Then were next diverted by the northeast trade winds that threw them back to the Moluccas, returning to Tidore on 19 November 1528.

On 3 May 1529, Álvaro de Saavedra tried again the second time by navigating back down south. Again he toured the western part of New Guinea getting to Manus Island, then heading north and discovering on 14 September Pohnpei and Ant in the Carolines. On 21 September, they discovered Ujelang Atoll, in the Marshalls that they charted as "Los Pintados" (The Painted Ones) because of its inhabitants being tattooed. On 1 October, they discovered Enewetak Atoll, that they named "Los Jardines" (The Gardens) because of their beauty and the friendliness of their inhabitants. Soon after Saavedra died, and Pedro Laso took command. They sailed north up to the 31N but not finding westerly winds and also after the death of Pedro Laso, they finally decided to turn around the ship and again return to the Moluccas, arriving to Halmahera next to Tidore on 8 December 1529. They were captured there by the Portuguese and held in captivity for five years. In 1534, the surviving eight members of his crew made it back to Spain.

== Hawaii ==
There are some questions as to whether Spanish explorers did arrive in the Hawaiian Islands two centuries before Captain James Cook's first recorded visit in 1778. For two and a half centuries Spanish galleons crossed the Pacific along a route that passed south of Hawaii on their way to Manila. The exact route was kept secret to protect the Spanish trade monopoly against competing powers.

In the case of the Saavedra expedition, the sighting of Hawaii could have happened when on 28 November 1527, land was sighted to the north, approximately in the longitude of Hawaii but not found again after a two-days search. Also, the later disappeared Santiago and Espíritu Santo could have arrived in Hawaii.

There is an old Hawaiian oral story of white people arriving on the islands many generations ago, and welcomed by Chief Wakalana. It is possible that these visitors were crew members from Saavedra's expedition.
