= Utirik Atoll =

Atoll in the Marshall Islands

Native name: Utrōk
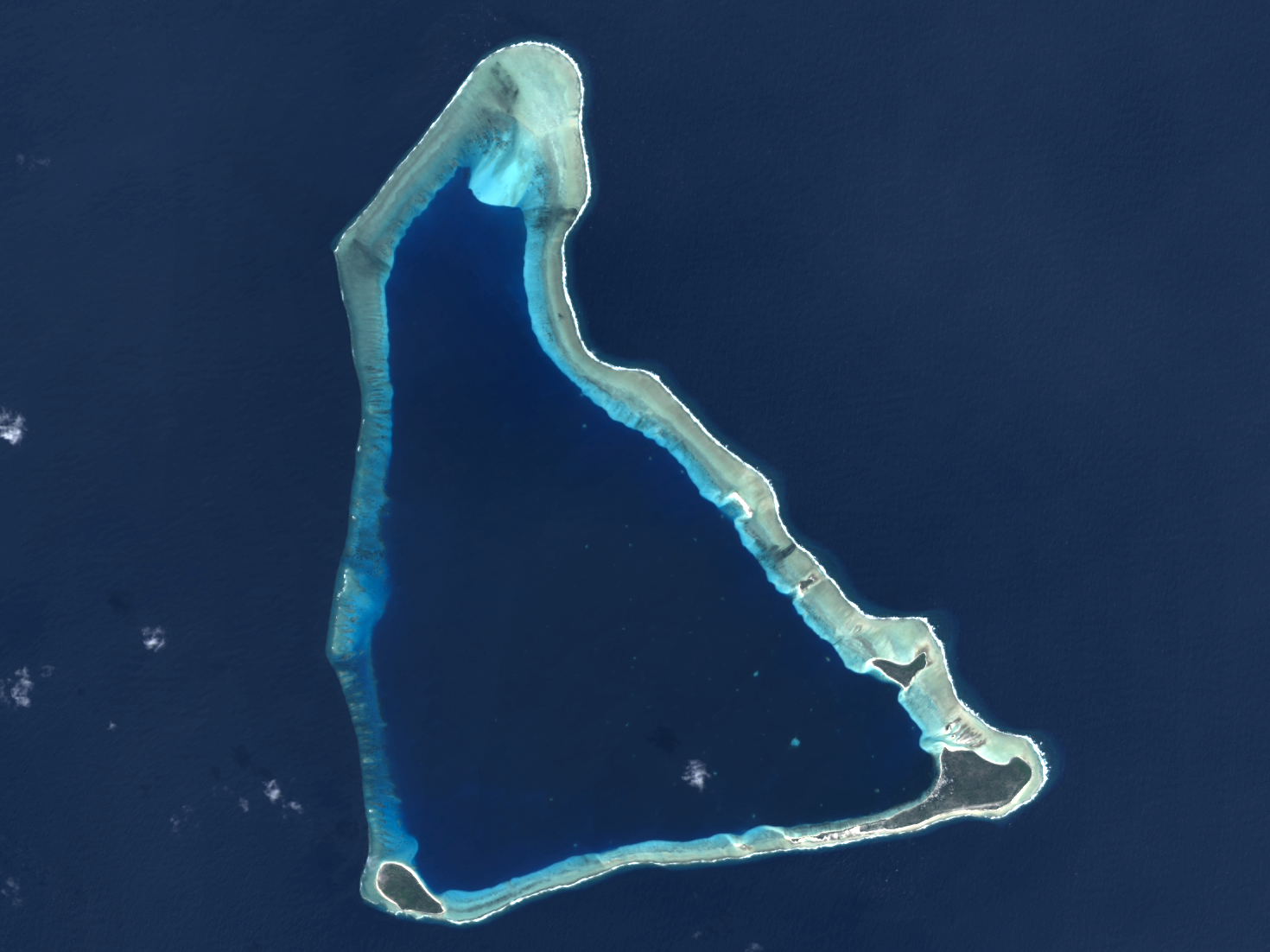
- NASA image of Utirik Atoll

- The Utirik Atoll in the Marshall Islands

- Location within Marshall Islands

Geography
- Location: North Pacific Ocean
- Coordinates: 11°15′14″N 169°48′00″E
- Archipelago: Ratak
- Total islands: 10
- Area: 2.43 km^{2} (0.94 sq mi)
- Highest elevation: 3 m (10 ft)

Administration
- Marshall Islands

Demographics
- Population: 264 (2021)
- Ethnic groups: Marshallese

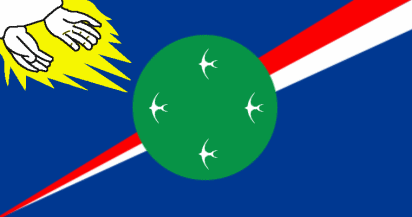
Flag

Utirik Atoll or Utrik Atoll (Marshallese: Utrōk, [wudˠ(ɯ)rˠɤk]) is a coral atoll of 10 islands in the Pacific Ocean, and forms a legislative district of the Ratak Chain of the Marshall Islands. Its total land area is only 2.4 square kilometers (0.94 sq mi), but it encloses a lagoon with an area of 57.7 square kilometers (22.29 sq mi). It is located approximately 47 kilometers (29 mi) east of Ujae Atoll. The population of Utirik Atoll was 264 at the 2021 census. It is one of the northernmost Islands of the Marshall Islands with permanent habitation.

The larger islets are:

- Utirik (Utrōk)
- Aon (Aon)
- Bikrak (Pekrak)
- Pike (Pike)
- Āllok (Āllok)
- Nalap (Ņa-ļap)

== History ==
Historical artifacts have been unearthed on the Atoll which date back to ca. 380 C.E., including tools likely used by early Micronesian peoples. Its first recorded sighting was by the Spanish navigator Álvaro de Saavedra on board the ship Florida on 29 December 1527. Together with Rongelap, Ailinginae and Toke atolls, they were charted as Islas de los Reyes (Islands of the Three Wise Kings in Spanish) due to the proximity of Epiphany. Utirik Atoll was claimed by the German Empire and the rest of the Marshall Islands in 1885. After World War I, the island came under the South Seas Mandate of the Empire of Japan. Following the end of World War II, Utirik went under the control of the United States as part of the Trust Territory of the Pacific Islands. Utirik was one of four atolls affected by nuclear fallout from Castle Bravo, the largest of the many nuclear weapon tests conducted at Bikini Atoll immediately following World War II. Research is still being done to ascertain the radiation levels, though many scientists agree that no harmful effects from the radiation are still present. The island has been part of the independent Republic of the Marshall Islands since 1986.

== Education ==
The Marshall Islands Public School System operates Utrik Elementary School. Northern Islands High School on Wotje serves the community.

== Temperature record ==
On 24 August 2016, Utirik Atoll recorded a temperature of 35.6 °C (96.1 °F), the highest temperature ever recorded in the Marshall Islands.

== See also ==
- Also contaminated by the Castle Bravo test: Rongelap Atoll, Ailinginae Atoll, Rongerik Atoll
