= USS Steuben County =

1945 LST-542-class tank landing ship

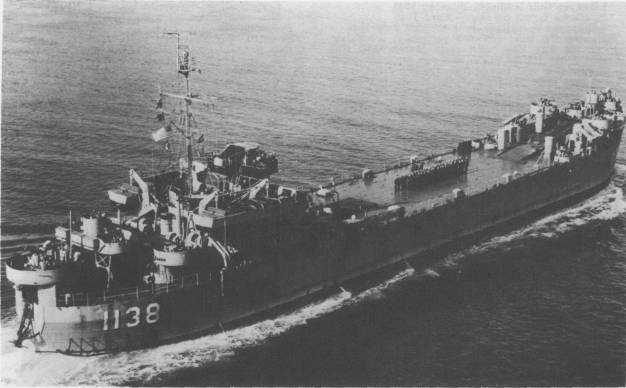
- USS Steuben County

History

United States
- Name: USS LST-1138
- Builder: Chicago Bridge & Iron Company; Seneca, Illinois
- Laid down: 6 January 1945
- Launched: 5 April 1945
- Sponsored by: Mrs. Hattie R. Fox
- Commissioned: 24 April 1945
- Renamed: USS Steuben County (LST-1138), 1 July 1955
- Stricken: 1 February 1961
- Honors and awards: 5 battle stars, Korean War
- Fate: Sold to Zidell Explorations, Inc., Portland, Oreg., on 11 August 1961

General characteristics
- Class & type: LST-542-class tank landing ship
- Displacement: 1,490 tons (light); 4,080 tons (full load of 2,100 tons)
- Length: 328 ft (100 m)
- Beam: 50 ft (15 m)
- Draft: 8 ft (2.4 m) forward; 14 ft 4 in (4.37 m) aft (full load)
- Propulsion: Two diesel engines, two shafts
- Speed: 10.8 knots (20 km/h) (max); 9 knots (17 km/h) (econ)
- Complement: 7 officers, 204 enlisted
- Armament: 8 × 40 mm guns; 12 × 20 mm guns

USS Steuben County (LST-1138) was an LST-542-class tank landing ship built for the United States Navy during World War II. Named after counties in Indiana and New York, she was the only U.S. Naval vessel to bear the name.

== Service history ==
Completed too late for service in World War II, LST-1138 performed occupation duty in the Far East until early January 1946. After post-war operations with the Pacific Fleet, LST-1138 saw extensive service during the Korean War, including the 1950 amphibious assault at Inchon, and a Korean prisoner exchange in 1953. She earned five battle stars for her service. During various cruises across the Pacific, she ranged as far north as Barrow, Alaska, and as far south as Taka Atoll in the Marshall Islands. On 1 July 1955, she was renamed Steuben County (LST-1138) (q.v.) after counties in Indiana and New York. She was struck from the Navy List on 1 February 1961 and sold to Zidell Explorations, Inc., Portland, Oregon, on 11 August 1961. Zidell had by that time expanded from shipbreaking into building barges with steel recovered from decommissioned ships, including Steuben County.
