= Marshallese language =

Micronesian language of the Marshall Islands

Marshallese
- Rimajol
- (new orthography) Kajin Ṃajeḷ (old orthography) Kajin Majōl
- Native to: Marshall Islands
- Ethnicity: Marshallese
- Native speakers: (55,000 cited 1979)
- Language family: Austronesian: Malayo-Polynesian; Oceanic; Micronesian; Micronesian Proper; Nuclear Micronesian; Marshallese
- Early forms: Proto-Austronesian: Proto-Malayo-Polynesian; Proto-Oceanic; Proto-Micronesian; Proto-Micronesian Proper; Proto-Nuclear Micronesian; Old Marshallese
- Standard forms: Standard Marshallese
- Dialects: Eastern; Western
- Writing system: Latin (Marshallese alphabet)

Official status
- Official language in: Marshall Islands

Language codes
- ISO 639-1: mh
- ISO 639-2: mah
- ISO 639-3: mah
- Glottolog: mars1254
- Map of Micronesian languages; Marshallese is spoken in the orange area.

Marshallese (Marshallese: Kajin Ṃajeḷ or Kajin Majōl [kɑzʲinʲ(i)mˠɑːzʲɛlˠ]), also known as Ebon, is a Micronesian language spoken in the Marshall Islands. The language of the Marshallese people, it is spoken by nearly all of the country's population of 59,000, making it the principal language. There are also roughly 27,000 Marshallese citizens residing in the United States, nearly all of whom speak Marshallese, as well as residents in other countries such as Nauru and Kiribati.

There are two major dialects, the western Rālik and the eastern Ratak.

== Classification ==
Marshallese, a Micronesian language, is a member of the Eastern Oceanic subgroup of the Austronesian languages. The closest linguistic relatives of Marshallese are the other Micronesian languages, including Gilbertese, Nauruan, Pohnpeian, Mokilese, Chuukese, Refaluwasch, and Kosraean. Marshallese shows 50% lexical similarity with Gilbertese, Mokilese, and Pohnpeian.

Within the Micronesian archipelago, Marshallese—along with the rest of the Micronesian language group—is not as closely related to the more ambiguously classified Oceanic language Yapese in Yap State, or to the Polynesian outlier languages Kapingamarangi and Nukuoro in Pohnpei State, and even less closely related to the non-Oceanic languages Palauan in Palau and Chamorro in the Mariana Islands.

== Variation ==
The Republic of the Marshall Islands contains 34 atolls that are split into two chains, the eastern Ratak Chain and the western Rālik Chain. These two chains have different dialects, which differ mainly lexically, and are mutually intelligible. The atoll of Ujelang in the west was reported to have "slightly less homogeneous speech", but it has been uninhabited since 1980.

The Ratak and Rālik dialects differ phonetically in how they deal with stems that begin with double consonants. Ratak Marshallese inserts a vowel to separate the consonants, while Rālik adds a vowel before the consonants (and pronounced an unwritten consonant phoneme /j/ before the vowel). For example, the stem kkure 'play' becomes ikkure in Rālik Marshallese and kukure in Ratak Marshallese.

== Status ==
A poster sponsored by CDC about COVID-19 prevention in Marshallese

Marshallese is the official language of the Marshall Islands and enjoys vigorous use. As of 1979, the language was spoken by 43,900 people in the Marshall Islands. In 2020, the number was closer to 59,000. Additional groups of speakers in other countries including Nauru and the United States increase the total number of Marshallese speakers, with approximately 27,000 Marshallese-Americans living in the United States. Along with Pohnpeian and Chuukese, Marshallese stands out among Micronesian languages in having tens of thousands of speakers; most Micronesian languages have far fewer. A dictionary and at least two Bible translations have been published in Marshallese.

== Phonology ==
=== Consonants ===
Marshallese has a large consonant inventory, and each consonant has some type of secondary articulation (palatalization, velarization, or rounding). The palatalized consonants are regarded as "light", and the velarized and rounded consonants are regarded as "heavy", with the rounded consonants being both velarized and labialized. (This contrast is similar to that between "slender" and "broad" consonants in Goidelic languages, or between "soft" and "hard" consonants in Slavic languages.) The "light" consonants are considered more relaxed articulations.

Consonant phonemes of Marshallese
	Labial		Coronal			Dorsal	
	Light	Heavy	Light	Heavy		Heavy	
	Palatalized	Velarized	Palatalized	Velarized	Labialized	(Velar)	Labialized
Plosive	pʲ	pˠ	tʲ	tˠ		k	kʷ
Nasal	mʲ	mˠ	nʲ	nˠ	nʷ	ŋ	ŋʷ
Trill			rʲ	rˠ	rʷ		
Lateral			lʲ	lˠ	lʷ		
Glide			j			(ɰ)	w

Although Marshallese has no voicing contrast in consonants, stops may be allophonically partially voiced ([p → b], [t → d], [k → ɡ]), when they are between vowels and not geminated. (Technically, partially voiced stops would be [p̬~b̥], [t̬~d̥], [k̬~ɡ̊], but this article uses voiced transcriptions [b], [d], [ɡ] for simplicity.) Final consonants are often unreleased.

Glides /j ɰ w/ vanish in many environments, with surrounding vowels assimilating their backness and roundedness. That is motivated by the limited surface distribution of these phonemes as well as other evidence that backness and roundedness are not specified phonemically for Marshallese vowels. In fact, the consonant /ɰ/ never surfaces phonetically but is used to explain the preceding phenomenon. (/j/ and /w/ may surface phonetically in word-initial and word-final positions and, even then, not consistently.)

Bender (1968) explains that it was once assumed that there were six bilabial consonants because of observed surface realizations, /p pʲ pʷ m mʲ mʷ/, but he determined that two of these, /p m/, were actually allophones of /pʲ mʲ/ respectively before front vowels and allophones of /pˠ mˠ/ respectively before back vowels. Before front vowels, the velarized labial consonants /pˠ mˠ/ actually tend to have rounded (labiovelarized) articulations [pʷ mʷ], but they remain unrounded on the phonemic level, and there are no distinct /pʷ mʷ/ phonemes. The pronunciation guide used by Naan (2014) still recognizes [p m] as allophone symbols separate from [pʲ pˠ mʲ mˠ] in these same conditions while recognizing that there are only palatalized and velarized phonemes. This article uses [pʲ pˠ mʲ mˠ] in phonetic transcriptions.

The consonant /tʲ/ may be phonetically realized as [tʲ], [t͡sʲ], [sʲ], [t͡ɕ], [ɕ], [c], or [ç] (or any of their voiced variants [dʲ], [d͡zʲ], [zʲ], [d͡ʑ], [ʑ], [ɟ], or [ʝ]), in free variation. Word-internally it usually assumes a voiced fricative articulation as [zʲ] (or [ʑ] or [ʝ]) but not when geminated. /tʲ/ is used to adapt foreign sibilants into Marshallese. In phonetic transcription, this article uses [tʲ] and [zʲ] as voiceless and voiced allophones of the same phoneme.

Marshallese has no distinct /tʷ/ phoneme.

The dorsal consonants /k ŋ kʷ ŋʷ/ are usually velar but with the tongue a little farther back [k̠ ɡ̠ ŋ̠ k̠ʷ ɡ̠ʷ ŋ̠ʷ], making them somewhere between velar and uvular in articulation. All dorsal phonemes are "heavy" (velarized or rounded), and none are "light" (palatalized). As stated before, the palatal consonant articulations [c], [ɟ], [ç] and [ʝ] are treated as allophones of the palatalized coronal obstruent /tʲ/, even though palatal consonants are physically dorsal. For simplicity, this article uses unmarked [k ɡ ŋ kʷ ɡʷ ŋʷ] in phonetic transcription.

Bender (1969) describes /nˠ/ and /nʷ/ as being "dark" r-colored, but is not more specific. The Marshallese-English Dictionary (MED) describes these as heavy dental nasals.

Consonants /rʲ/, /rˠ/ and /rʷ/ are all coronal consonants and full trills. /rˠ/ is similar to Spanish rr with a trill position just behind the alveolar ridge, a postalveolar trill [r̠ˠ], but /rʲ/ is a palatalized dental trill [r̪ʲ], articulated further forward behind the front teeth. The MED and Willson (2003) describe the rhotic consonants as "retroflex", but are not clear how this relates to their dental or alveolar trill positions. (See retroflex trill.) This article uses [rʲ], [rˠ] and [rʷ] in phonetic transcription.

The heavy lateral consonants /lˠ/ and /lʷ/ are dark l like in English feel, articulated [ɫ] and [ɫʷ] respectively. This article uses [lˠ] and [lʷ] in phonetic transcription.

The velarized consonants (and, by extension, the rounded consonants) may be velarized or pharyngealized like the emphatic consonants in Arabic or Mizrahi Hebrew.

=== Vowels ===
Marshallese has a vertical vowel system of just four vowel phonemes, each with several allophones depending on the surrounding consonants.

On the phonemic level, while Bender (1969) and Choi (1992) agree that the vowel phonemes are distinguished by height, they describe the abstract nature of these phonemes differently, with Bender treating the front unrounded surface realizations as their relaxed state that becomes altered by proximity of velarized or rounded consonants, while Choi uses central vowel symbols in a neutral fashion to notate the abstract phonemes and completely different front, back and rounded vowel symbols for surface realizations. Bender (1968, 1969), MED (1976) and Willson (2003) recognize four vowel phonemes, but Choi (1992) observes only three of the phonemes as having a stable quality, but theorizes that there may be a historical process of reduction from four to three, and otherwise ignores the fourth phoneme. For phonemic transcription of vowels, this article recognizes four phonemes and uses the front unrounded vowel /æ ɛ e i/ notation of the MED, following the approach of Bender (1969) in treating the front vowel surface realizations as the representative phonemes.

On the phonetic level, Bender (1968), MED (1976), Choi (1992), Willson (2003) and Naan (2014) notate some Marshallese vowel surface realizations differently from one another, and they disagree on how to characterize the vowel heights of the underlying phonemes, with Willson (2003) taking the most divergent approach in treating the four heights as actually two heights each with the added presence (+ATR) or absence (-ATR) of advanced tongue root. Bender (1968) assigns central vowel symbols for the surface realizations that neighbor velarized consonants, but the MED (1976), Choi (1992) and Willson (2003) largely assign back unrounded vowel symbols for these, with the exception that the MED uses [ə] rather than cardinal [ɤ] for the close-mid back unrounded vowel, and Choi (1992) and Willson (2003) use [a] rather than cardinal [ɑ] for the open back unrounded vowel. Naan (2014) is the only reference providing a vowel trapezium for its own vowels, and differs especially from the other vowel models in splitting the front allophones of /i/ into two realizations ([ɪ] before consonants and [i] in open syllables), merging the front allophones of /ɛ/ and /e/ as [ɛ] before consonants and [e] in open syllables, merging the rounded allophones of /ɛ/ and /e/ as [o], and indicating the front allophone of /æ/ as a close-mid central unrounded vowel [ɘ], a realization more raised even than the front allophone of the normally higher /ɛ/. For phonetic notation of vowel surface realizations, this article largely uses the MED's notation, but uses only cardinal symbols for back unrounded vowels.

Marshallese vowel phonemes and surface realizations
Bender				MED					Choi					Willson				Naan		
Height	Unrnd.		Rnd.	Height	Phon.	Unrnd.		Rnd.	Height	Phon.	Unrnd.		Rnd.	Height	Unrnd.		Rnd.	Unrnd.		Rnd.
Height	Frt.	Back		Height	Phon.	Frt.	Back		Height	Phon.	Frt.	Back		Height	Frt.	Back		Frt.	Back	
Close	[i]	[ɨ]	[u]	Close	{i}	[i]	[ɯ]	[u]	Close	/ɨ/	[i]	[ɯ]	[u]	+hi, +ATR	[i]	[ɯ]	[u]	[ɪ,i]	[ɪ̈]	[u]
Close-mid	[ɪ]	[ɪ̈]	[ʊ]	Mid	{ȩ}	[e]	[ə]	[o]						+hi, -ATR	[ɪ]	[ɤ]	[ʊ]	[ɛ,e]	[ɘ]	[o]
Mid	[e]	[ə]	[o]	Mid	{e}	[ɛ]	[ʌ]	[ɔ]	Mid	/ə/	[e]	[ʌ]	[o]	-hi, +ATR	[e]	[ʌ]	[o]	[ɛ,e]	[ʌ]	[o]
Open	[ɛ]	[a]	[ɔ]	Open	{a}	[æ]	[ɑ]	[ɒ]	Open	/ɐ/	[ɛ]	[a]	[ɔ]	-hi, -ATR	[ɛ]	[a]	[ɔ]	[ë]	[a]	[ɒ]

Superficially, 12 Marshallese vowel allophones appear in minimal pairs, a common test for phonemicity. For example, [mʲæ] (mā, 'breadfruit'), [mʲɑ] (ma, 'but'), and [mʲɒ] (mọ, 'taboo') are separate Marshallese words. However, the uneven distribution of glide phonemes suggests that they underlyingly end with the glides (thus /mʲæj/, /mʲæɰ/, /mʲæw/). When glides are taken into account, it emerges that there are only 4 vowel phonemes.

When a vowel phoneme appears between consonants with different secondary articulations, the vowel often surfaces as a smooth transition from one vowel allophone to the other. For example, jok 'shy', phonemically /tʲɛkʷ/, is often realized phonetically as [tʲɛ͡ɔkʷ]. It follows that there are 24 possible short diphthongs in Marshallese:

Phoneme	◌ʲ_◌ˠ	◌ʲ_◌ʷ	◌ˠ_◌ʲ	◌ˠ_◌ʷ	◌ʷ_◌ʲ	◌ʷ_◌ˠ
/i/	[i͡ɯ]	[i͡u]	[ɯ͡i]	[ɯ͡u]	[u͡i]	[u͡ɯ]
/e/	[e͡ɤ]	[e͡o]	[ɤ͡e]	[ɤ͡o]	[o͡e]	[o͡ɤ]
/ɛ/	[ɛ͡ʌ]	[ɛ͡ɔ]	[ʌ͡ɛ]	[ʌ͡ɔ]	[ɔ͡ɛ]	[ɔ͡ʌ]
/æ/	[æ͡ɑ]	[æ͡ɒ]	[ɑ͡æ]	[ɑ͡ɒ]	[ɒ͡æ]	[ɒ͡ɑ]

These diphthongs are the typical realizations of short vowels between two non-glide consonants, but in reality the diphthongs themselves are not phonemic, and short vowels between two consonants with different secondary articulations can be articulated as either a smooth diphthong (such as [ɛ͡ʌ]) or as a monophthong of one of the two vowel allophones (such as [ɛ ~ ʌ]), all in free variation. Bender (1968) also observes that when the would-be diphthong starts with a back rounded vowel [ɒ ɔ o u] and ends with a front unrounded vowel [æ ɛ e i], then a vowel allophone associated with the back unrounded vowels (notated in this article as [ɑ ʌ ɤ ɯ]) may also occur in the vowel nucleus. Because the cumulative visual complexity of notating so many diphthongs in phonetic transcriptions can make them more difficult to read, it is not uncommon to phonetically transcribe Marshallese vowel allophones only as one predominant monophthongal allophone, so that a word like [tʲɛ͡ɔkʷ] can be more simply transcribed as [tʲɔkʷ], in a condensed fashion. Before Bender's (1968) discovery that Marshallese utilized a vertical vowel system, it was conventional to transcribe the language in this manner with a presumed inventory of 12 vowel monophthong phonemes, and it remains in occasional use as a more condensed phonetic transcription. This article uses phonemic or diphthongal phonetic transcriptions for illustrative purposes, but for most examples it uses condensed phonetic transcription with the most relevant short vowel allophones roughly corresponding to Marshallese orthography as informed by the MED.

Some syllables appear to contain long vowels: naaj 'future'. They are thought to contain an underlying glide (/j/, /ɰ/ or /w/), which is not present phonetically. For instance, the underlying form of naaj is /nʲæɰætʲ/. Although the medial glide is not realized phonetically, it affects vowel quality; in a word like /nʲæɰætʲ/, the vowel transitions from [æ] to [ɑ] and then back to [æ], as [nʲæ͡ɑɑ͡ætʲ]. In condensed phonetic transcription, the same word can be expressed as [nʲɑɑtʲ] or [nʲɑːtʲ].

=== Phonotactics ===
Syllables in Marshallese follow CV, CVC, and VC patterns. Marshallese words always underlyingly begin and end with consonants. Initial, final, and long vowels may be explained as the results of underlying glides not present on the phonetic level. Initial vowels are sometimes realized with an onglide [j] or [w] but not consistently:

- /jætʲ/ → [ætʲ ~ jætʲ] 'weave'

Only homorganic consonant sequences are allowed in Marshallese, including geminate varieties of each consonant, except for glides. Non-homorganic clusters are separated by vowel epenthesis even across word boundaries. Some homorganic clusters are also disallowed:

- Obstruent-obstruent, nasal-nasal, liquid-liquid, nasal-obstruent, and nasal-liquid clusters undergo assimilation of the secondary articulation except if the first consonant is a rounded coronal or a rounded dorsal. Then, the clusters undergo assimilation of the rounded articulation.
- †Obstruent-liquid and liquid-obstruent clusters besides /lʲtˠ/ and /lˠtˠ/ undergo epenthesis.
- Liquid-nasal clusters undergo nasal assimilation.
- Obstruent-nasal clusters undergo epenthesis (if coronal) or nasal assimilation (if non-coronal).
- Clusters involving any glides undergo epenthesis, including otherwise homorganic clusters of two of the same glide.

The following assimilations are created, with empty combinations representing epenthesis.

Bilabials
↓→	/p/	/m/
/p/	/pː/	/mː/
/m/	/mp/	/mː/

Coronals
↓→	/t/	/n/	/r/	/l/
/t/	/tː/			
/n/	/nt/	/nː/	/nr/	/nl/
/r/		/nː/	/rː/	/rl/
/l/	†	/nː/	/lr/	/lː/

Dorsals
↓→	/k/	/ŋ/
/k/	/kː/	/ŋː/
/ŋ/	/ŋk/	/ŋː/

Secondary
↓→	/◌ʲ/	/◌ˠ/	/◌ʷ/
/◌ʲ/	/◌ʲ◌ʲ/	/◌ˠ◌ˠ/	/◌ʷ◌ʷ/
/◌ˠ/	/◌ʲ◌ʲ/	/◌ˠ◌ˠ/	/◌ʷ◌ʷ/
/◌ʷ/	/◌ʷ◌ʷ/		

The vowel height of an epenthetic vowel is not phonemic as the epenthetic vowel itself is not phonemic, but is still phonetically predictable given the two nearest other vowels and whether one or both of the cluster consonants are glides. Bender (1968) does not specifically explain the vowel heights of epenthetic vowels between two non-glides, but of his various examples containing such vowels, none of the epenthetic vowels has a height lower than the highest of either of their nearest neighboring vowels, and the epenthetic vowel actually becomes /ɛ̯/ if the two nearest vowels are both /æ/. Naan (2014) does not take the heights of epenthetic vowels between non-glides into consideration, phonetically transcribing all of them as a schwa [ə]. But when one of the consonants in a cluster is a glide, the height of the epenthetic vowel between them follows a different process, assuming the same height of whichever vowel is on the opposite side of that glide, forming a long vowel with it across the otherwise silent glide. Epenthetic vowels do not affect the rhythm of the spoken language, and can never be a stressed syllable. Phonetic transcription may indicate epenthetic vowels between two non-glides as non-syllabic, using IPA notation similar to that of semi-vowels. Certain Westernized Marshallese placenames spell out the epenthetic vowels:

- Ebeye, from earlier Ebeje, from Epjā
- Erikub, from Ādkup
- Kwajalein, from Kuwajleen
- Majuro, from Mājro
- Namorik, from Naṃdik
- Omelek, from Koṃle ("Koṃle, Koṃle")
- Rongelap, from Roñḷap
- Rongerik, from Roñdik
- Ujelang, from Wūjlañ
- Uliga, from Wūlka
- Utirik, from Utrōk

Epenthetic vowels in general can be omitted without affecting meaning, such as in song or in enunciated syllable breaks. This article uses non-syllabic notation in phonetic IPA transcription to indicate epenthetic vowels between non-glides.

=== Timing ===
The short vowel phonemes /æ ɛ e i/ and the approximant phonemes /j ɰ w/ all occupy a roughly equal duration of time. Though they occupy time, the approximants are generally not articulated as glides, and Choi (1992) does not rule out a deeper level of representation. In particular, /V/ short vowels occupy one unit of time, and /VGV/ long vowels (for which /G/ is an approximant phoneme) are three times as long.

As a matter of prosody, each /C/ consonant and /V/ vowel phonemic sequence carries one mora in length, with the exception of /C/ in /CV/ sequences where the vowel carries one mora for both phonemes. All morae are thus measured in /CV/ or shut /C/ sequences:

- /CVC/ is two morae: /CV-C/. It is also the shortest possible length of a Marshallese word.
- /CVCVC/ is three morae: /CV-CV-C/. Since approximants are also consonants, long vowel sequences of /CVGVC/ are also three morae.
- /CVCCVC/ is four morae: /CV-C-CV-C/.
- Prefixes like ri- are /CV-/ sequences occupying only one mora but are attached to words rather than standing as words on their own.
- Suffixes like -in are /-VC/ sequences. The syllable itself occupies two morae but adds only one mora to the word because the vowel attaches itself to the last consonant phoneme in the word, changing /-C/ into /-C‿V-C/.

That makes Marshallese a mora-rhythmed language in a fashion similar to Finnish, Gilbertese, Hawaiian, and Japanese.

=== Historic sound changes ===
Marshallese reflexes of Proto-Oceanic consonants
Proto-Oceanic	*mp	*mp,ŋp	*p	*m	*m,ŋm	*k	*ŋk	*ŋ	*y	*w	*t		*s,nj	*ns,j	*j	*nt,nd	*d,R	*l	*n	*ɲ
Proto-Micronesian	*p	*pʷ	*f	*m	*mʷ	*k	*x	*ŋ	*y	*w	*t	*T	*s	*S	*Z	*c	*r	*l	*n	*ɲ
Marshallese	/pʲ/	/pˠ/	/j/	/mʲ/	/mˠ/	/k, kʷ/	∅	/ŋ, ŋʷ/	/j/	/w/	/tʲ/	/tʲ/	/tˠ/	/tˠ/	∅	/rʲ/	/rˠ, rʷ/	/lʲ, lˠ, lʷ/	/nʲ, nˠ, nʷ/	/nʲ/

Marshallese consonants show splits conditioned by the surrounding Proto-Micronesian vowels. Proto-Micronesian *k *ŋ *r become rounded next to *o or next to *u except in bisyllables whose other vowel is unrounded. Default outcomes of *l and *n are palatalized; they become velarized or rounded before *a or sometimes *o if there is no high vowel in an adjacent syllable. Then, roundedness is determined by the same rule as above.

== Orthography ==
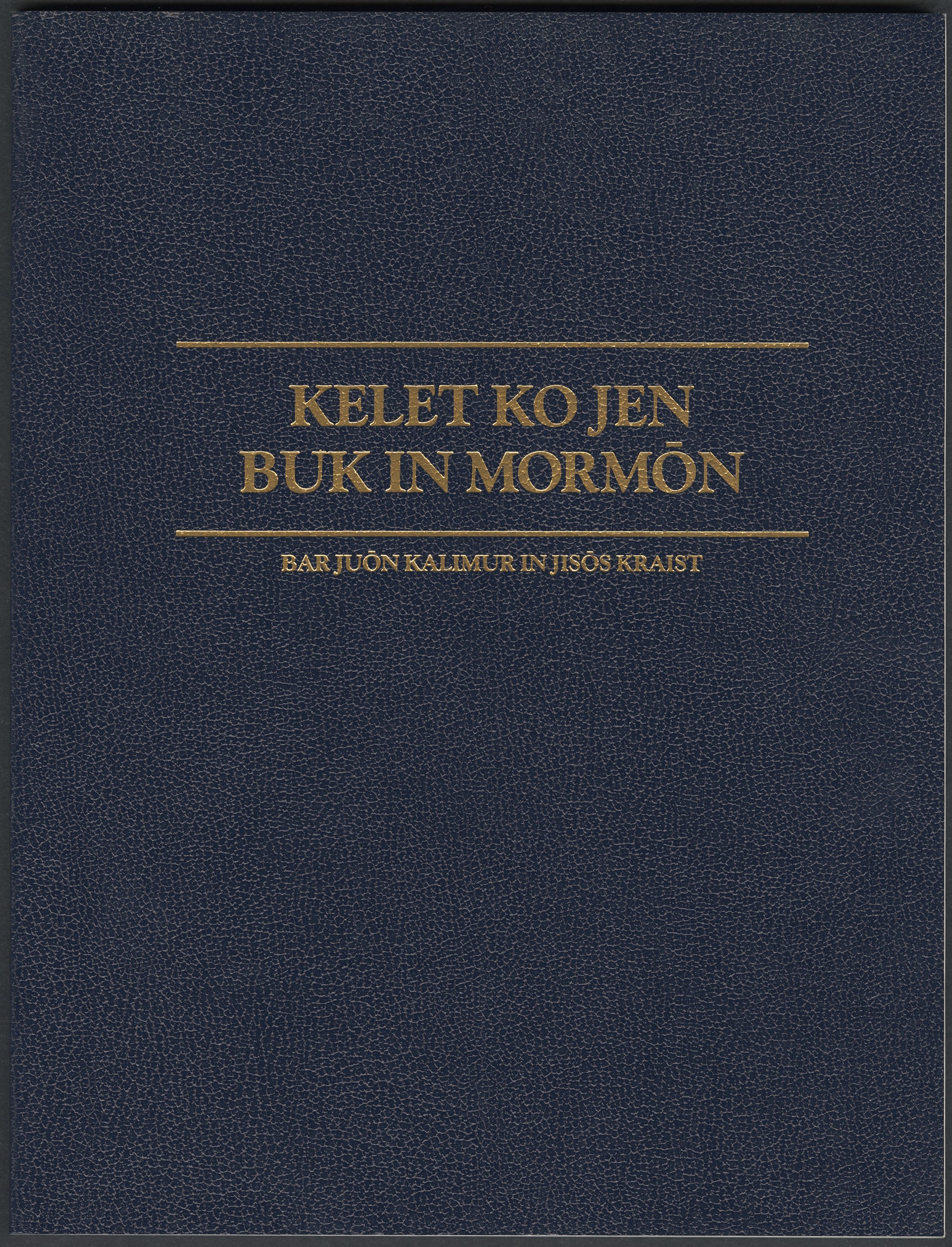
Marshallese version of the Book of Mormon

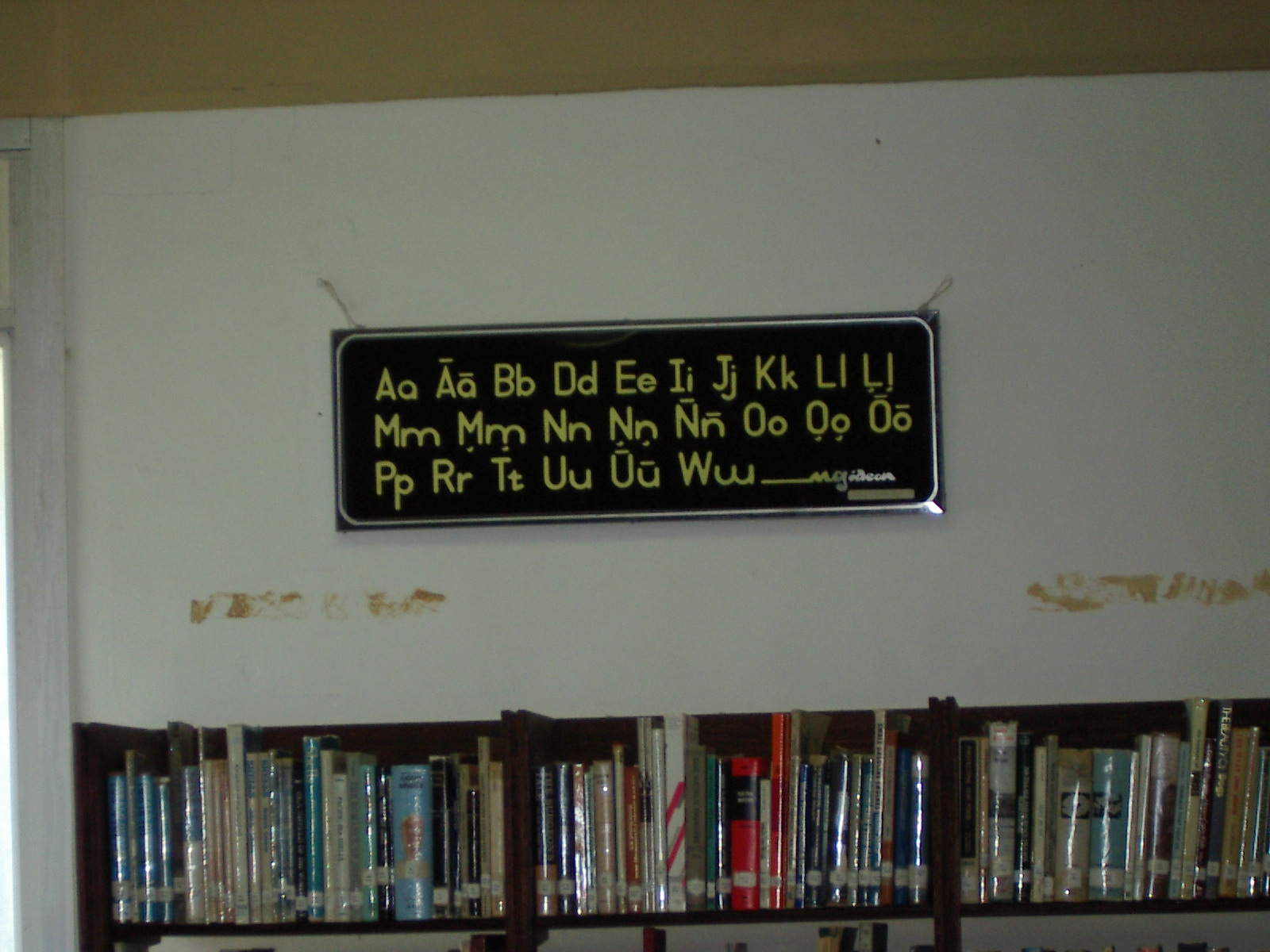
Marshallese alphabet in a library

Marshallese is written in the Latin alphabet. There are two competing orthographies. The "old" orthography was introduced by missionaries. This system is not highly consistent or faithful in representing the sounds of Marshallese, but until recently, it had no competing orthography. It is currently widely used, including in newspapers and signs. The "new" orthography is gaining popularity especially in schools and among young adults and children. The "new" orthography represents the sounds of the Marshallese language more faithfully and is the system used in the Marshallese–English dictionary by Abo et al.

The current alphabet, as promoted by the Republic of the Marshall Islands, consists of 24 letters.

A	Ā	B	D	E	I	J	K	L	L͏̧	M	M̧	N	N͏̧	N̄	O	O̧	Ō	P	R	T	U	Ū	W
a	ā	b	d	e	i	j	k	l	l͏̧	m	m̧	n	n͏̧	n̄	o	o̧	ō	p	r	t	u	ū	w

Orthographic consonants of Marshallese
	Labial		Coronal			Dorsal	
	Light	Heavy	Light	Heavy		Heavy	
	Palatalised	Velarised	Palatalised	Velarised	Labialised	(Velar)	Labialised
Stop	p	b(w)	j	t		k	k(w)
Nasal	m	ṃ(w)	n	ṇ	ṇ(w)	ñ	ñ(w)
Rhotic			d	r	r(w)		
Lateral			l	ḷ	ḷ(w)		
Glide			e/i/–			–	w/–

Orthographic vowels of Marshallese
	Unrounded		Rounded
	Front	Back	
Close	i	ū	u
Mid	e	ō	o
Open	ā	a	ọ

Marshallese spelling is based on pronunciation rather than a phonemic analysis. Therefore, backness is marked in vowels despite being allophonic (it does not change the meaning), and many instances of the glides /j ɰ w/ proposed on the phonemic level are unwritten, because they do not surface as consonants phonetically. In particular, the glide /ɰ/, which never surfaces as a consonant phonetically, is always unwritten.

The letter w is generally used only in three situations:

1. To mark a rounded consonant (one of kw ḷw ṇw ñw rw) or approximant phoneme (w) before a vowel that precedes an unrounded consonant phoneme (a ā e i ō ū). Even then, if the consonant phoneme comes after a back rounded vowel ọ o u and before another vowel, it is common to write one of ḷ ṇ r instead of ḷw ṇw rw, but the rounded dorsal consonants kw ñw are still written with w in these circumstances.
2. To mark a velarized bilabial consonant (either bw or ṃw) before a vowel that precedes a palatalized consonant phoneme (ā e i).
3. To indicate a [w] glide phonetically surfacing either word-initially or between two vowels.

w is never written out word-finally or before another consonant.

- Kuwajleen / Kuajleen [kʷuwɑzʲɛ̆lʲɛːnʲ] "Kwajalein".

The palatal glide phoneme /j/ may also be written out but only as e before one of a o ō ọ, or as i before one of either u ū. The approximant is never written before any of ā e i. A stronger raised palatal glide [i̯], phonemically analyzed as the exotic un-syllabic consonant-vowel-consonant sequence /ji̯j/ rather than plain /j/, may occur word-initially before any vowel and is written i. For historical reasons, certain words like iọkwe may be written as yokwe with a y, which does not otherwise exist in the Marshallese alphabet.

One source of orthographic variation is in the representation of vowels. Pure monophthongs are written consistently based on vowel quality. However, short diphthongs may often be written with one of the two vowel sounds that they contain. (Alternate phonetic realizations for the same phonemic sequences are provided purely for illustrative purposes.)

- wōtōm / otem [wɤdˠɤmʲ ~ o͜ɤdˠɤ͜emʲ ~ odˠemʲ] "all; every".

Modern orthography has a bias in certain spelling choices in which both possibilities are equally clear between two non-approximant consonants.

- a is preferred over ā.
  ḷap [lˠɑpʲ ~ lˠɑ͜æpʲ ~ lˠæpʲ] "big", not *ḷāp
- i is preferred over ū.
  dik [rʲik ~ rʲi͜ɯk ~ rʲɯk] "small", not *dūk
- Historically, both ō and e have been common and sometimes interchangeable. It is still true today with some words. In the new orthography, ō is generally preferred over e in most such situations.
  aelōñ [ɑelʲɤŋ ~ ɑelʲe͜ɤŋ ~ ɑelʲeŋ] "atoll; island; land", not *aeleñ
  Epatōn [ɛbʲɑdˠʌnʲ ~ ɛbʲæ͜ɑdˠʌ͜ɛnʲ] "Ebadon", not *Epaten
  Kūrijṃōj [kɯrˠizʲĭmˠɤtʲ ~ kɯrˠɯ͜izʲĭ͜ɯ̆mˠɤ͜etʲ] "Christmas", not *Kūrijṃej
  Nōḷ [nʲʌlˠ ~ nʲɛ͜ʌlˠ ~ nʲɛlˠ] "Nell", not *Neḷ
- However, after one of d j m p and before one of unrounded b k ḷ ṃ ṇ ñ r t, the spelling e is preferred over ō.
  pinjeḷ [pʲinzʲɛlˠ ~ pʲinzʲɛ͜ʌlˠ ~ pʲinzʲʌlˠ] "pencil", not *pinjōḷ
- For the name of the Marshall Islands, the new orthography prefers e, but the spelling with ō is still found.
  Ṃajeḷ or Ṃajōḷ [mˠɑːzʲɛlˠ ~ mˠɑːzʲɛ͜ʌlˠ ~ mˠɑːzʲʌlˠ], "Marshall Islands"

In a syllable whose first consonant is rounded and whose second consonant is palatalized, it is common to see the vowel between them written as one of a ō ū, usually associated with a neighboring velarized consonant:

- Ọkwōj [ɒɡʷʌtʲ ~ ɒɡʷɔ͜ɛtʲ] "August".
- Wūjlañ [wɯzʲĭlʲɑŋ ~ u͜izʲĭlʲæ͜ɑŋ ~ uzʲĭlʲɑŋ] "Ujelang".

The exception is long vowels and long diphthongs made up of two mora units, which are written with the vowel quality closer to the phonetic nucleus of the long syllable:

- jouj [tʲoutʲ] "kindness".
- naaj [nʲɑːtʲ] "will be".
- tāākji [tˠæːɡĭzʲi] "taxicab".

If the syllable is phonetically open, the vowel written is usually the second vowel in the diphthong: the word bwe [pˠɛ] is usually not written any other way, but exceptions exist such as aelōñ (/ɰajɘlʲɘŋ/ [ɑelʲɤŋ] "land; country; island; atoll"), which is preferred over *āelōñ because the a spelling emphasizes that the first (unwritten) glide phoneme is dorsal rather than palatal.

The spelling of grammatical affixes, such as ri- (/rˠi-/) and -in (/-inʲ/) is less variable despite the fact that their vowels become diphthongs with second member dependent on the preceding/following consonant: the prefix ri- may be pronounced as any of [rˠɯ͜i, rˠɯ, rˠɯ͜u] depending on the stem. The term Ri-Ṃajeḷ ("Marshallese people") is actually pronounced [rˠɯmˠɑːzʲɛlˠ] as if it were Rūṃajeḷ.

=== Display issues ===
In the most polished printed text, the letters L‌̧ l‌̧ M̧ m̧ N‌̧ n‌̧ O̧ o̧ always appear with unaltered cedillas directly beneath, and the letters Ā ā N̄ n̄ Ō ō Ū ū always appear with unaltered macrons directly above. Regardless, the diacritics are often replaced by ad hoc spellings using more common or more easily displayable characters. In particular, the Marshallese-English Online Dictionary (but not the print version), or MOD, uses the following characters:

Standard					MOD
L‌̧	M̧	N‌̧	N̄	O̧	Ḷ	Ṃ	Ṇ	Ñ	Ọ
l‌̧	m̧	n‌̧	n̄	o̧	ḷ	ṃ	ṇ	ñ	ọ

As of 2019, there are no dedicated precomposed characters in Unicode for the letters M̧ m̧ N̄ n̄ O̧ o̧; they must be displayed as plain Latin letters with combining diacritics, and even many Unicode fonts will not display the combinations properly and neatly. Although L‌̧ l‌̧ N‌̧ n‌̧ exist as precomposed characters in Unicode, these letters also do not display properly as Marshallese letters in most Unicode fonts. Unicode defines the letters as having a cedilla, but fonts usually display them with a comma below because of rendering expectations of the Latvian alphabet. For many fonts, a workaround is to encode these letters as the base letter L l N n followed by a zero-width non-joiner and then a combining cedilla, producing L‌̧ l‌̧ N‌̧ n‌̧.

Both systems already require fonts that display Basic Latin (with A a B b D d E e I i J j K k L l M m N n O o P p R r T t U u W w) and Latin Extended-A (with Ā ā Ō ō Ū ū). The standard orthography also requires Combining Diacritical Marks for the combining diacritics. The MOD's alternative letters have the advantage of being neatly displayable as all-precomposed characters in any Unicode fonts that support Basic Latin, Latin Extended-A along with Latin-1 Supplement (with Ñ ñ) and Latin Extended Additional (with Ḷ ḷ Ṃ ṃ Ṇ ṇ Ọ ọ). If a font comfortably displays both the International Alphabet of Sanskrit Transliteration and the Vietnamese alphabet, it can also display MOD Marshallese.

This chart highlights the display issues in common web fonts and common free Unicode fonts that are known to support standard or MOD Marshallese lettering. Distinct typefaces appear only if the operating environment supports them. Some fonts have combining diacritic alignment issues, and the vast majority of the fonts have the Latvian diacritic issue; of the fonts shown below, only the Noto series displays Marshallese correctly.

Marshallese letters in various typefaces
Typeface	Standard letters																With "mh" code				With zero-width non-joiner				MOD alternates									
Arial	Ā	ā	Ļ	ļ	M̧	m̧	Ņ	ņ	N̄	n̄	O̧	o̧	Ō	ō	Ū	ū	Ļ	ļ	Ņ	ņ	L‌̧	l‌̧	N‌̧	n‌̧	Ḷ	ḷ	Ṃ	ṃ	Ṇ	ṇ	Ñ	ñ	Ọ	ọ
Arial Unicode MS	Ā	ā	Ļ	ļ	M̧	m̧	Ņ	ņ	N̄	n̄	O̧	o̧	Ō	ō	Ū	ū	Ļ	ļ	Ņ	ņ	L‌̧	l‌̧	N‌̧	n‌̧	Ḷ	ḷ	Ṃ	ṃ	Ṇ	ṇ	Ñ	ñ	Ọ	ọ
Calibri	Ā	ā	Ļ	ļ	M̧	m̧	Ņ	ņ	N̄	n̄	O̧	o̧	Ō	ō	Ū	ū	Ļ	ļ	Ņ	ņ	L‌̧	l‌̧	N‌̧	n‌̧	Ḷ	ḷ	Ṃ	ṃ	Ṇ	ṇ	Ñ	ñ	Ọ	ọ
Cambria	Ā	ā	Ļ	ļ	M̧	m̧	Ņ	ņ	N̄	n̄	O̧	o̧	Ō	ō	Ū	ū	Ļ	ļ	Ņ	ņ	L‌̧	l‌̧	N‌̧	n‌̧	Ḷ	ḷ	Ṃ	ṃ	Ṇ	ṇ	Ñ	ñ	Ọ	ọ
Candara	Ā	ā	Ļ	ļ	M̧	m̧	Ņ	ņ	N̄	n̄	O̧	o̧	Ō	ō	Ū	ū	Ļ	ļ	Ņ	ņ	L‌̧	l‌̧	N‌̧	n‌̧	Ḷ	ḷ	Ṃ	ṃ	Ṇ	ṇ	Ñ	ñ	Ọ	ọ
Charis SIL	Ā	ā	Ļ	ļ	M̧	m̧	Ņ	ņ	N̄	n̄	O̧	o̧	Ō	ō	Ū	ū	Ļ	ļ	Ņ	ņ	L‌̧	l‌̧	N‌̧	n‌̧	Ḷ	ḷ	Ṃ	ṃ	Ṇ	ṇ	Ñ	ñ	Ọ	ọ
Code2000	Ā	ā	Ļ	ļ	M̧	m̧	Ņ	ņ	N̄	n̄	O̧	o̧	Ō	ō	Ū	ū	Ļ	ļ	Ņ	ņ	L‌̧	l‌̧	N‌̧	n‌̧	Ḷ	ḷ	Ṃ	ṃ	Ṇ	ṇ	Ñ	ñ	Ọ	ọ
Consolas	Ā	ā	Ļ	ļ	M̧	m̧	Ņ	ņ	N̄	n̄	O̧	o̧	Ō	ō	Ū	ū	Ļ	ļ	Ņ	ņ	L‌̧	l‌̧	N‌̧	n‌̧	Ḷ	ḷ	Ṃ	ṃ	Ṇ	ṇ	Ñ	ñ	Ọ	ọ
Constantia	Ā	ā	Ļ	ļ	M̧	m̧	Ņ	ņ	N̄	n̄	O̧	o̧	Ō	ō	Ū	ū	Ļ	ļ	Ņ	ņ	L‌̧	l‌̧	N‌̧	n‌̧	Ḷ	ḷ	Ṃ	ṃ	Ṇ	ṇ	Ñ	ñ	Ọ	ọ
Corbel	Ā	ā	Ļ	ļ	M̧	m̧	Ņ	ņ	N̄	n̄	O̧	o̧	Ō	ō	Ū	ū	Ļ	ļ	Ņ	ņ	L‌̧	l‌̧	N‌̧	n‌̧	Ḷ	ḷ	Ṃ	ṃ	Ṇ	ṇ	Ñ	ñ	Ọ	ọ
Cormorant	Ā	ā	Ļ	ļ	M̧	m̧	Ņ	ņ	N̄	n̄	O̧	o̧	Ō	ō	Ū	ū	Ļ	ļ	Ņ	ņ	L‌̧	l‌̧	N‌̧	n‌̧	Ḷ	ḷ	Ṃ	ṃ	Ṇ	ṇ	Ñ	ñ	Ọ	ọ
Courier New	Ā	ā	Ļ	ļ	M̧	m̧	Ņ	ņ	N̄	n̄	O̧	o̧	Ō	ō	Ū	ū	Ļ	ļ	Ņ	ņ	L‌̧	l‌̧	N‌̧	n‌̧	Ḷ	ḷ	Ṃ	ṃ	Ṇ	ṇ	Ñ	ñ	Ọ	ọ
DejaVu Sans	Ā	ā	Ļ	ļ	M̧	m̧	Ņ	ņ	N̄	n̄	O̧	o̧	Ō	ō	Ū	ū	Ļ	ļ	Ņ	ņ	L‌̧	l‌̧	N‌̧	n‌̧	Ḷ	ḷ	Ṃ	ṃ	Ṇ	ṇ	Ñ	ñ	Ọ	ọ
DejaVu Sans Mono	Ā	ā	Ļ	ļ	M̧	m̧	Ņ	ņ	N̄	n̄	O̧	o̧	Ō	ō	Ū	ū	Ļ	ļ	Ņ	ņ	L‌̧	l‌̧	N‌̧	n‌̧	Ḷ	ḷ	Ṃ	ṃ	Ṇ	ṇ	Ñ	ñ	Ọ	ọ
DejaVu Serif	Ā	ā	Ļ	ļ	M̧	m̧	Ņ	ņ	N̄	n̄	O̧	o̧	Ō	ō	Ū	ū	Ļ	ļ	Ņ	ņ	L‌̧	l‌̧	N‌̧	n‌̧	Ḷ	ḷ	Ṃ	ṃ	Ṇ	ṇ	Ñ	ñ	Ọ	ọ
Gentium	Ā	ā	Ļ	ļ	M̧	m̧	Ņ	ņ	N̄	n̄	O̧	o̧	Ō	ō	Ū	ū	Ļ	ļ	Ņ	ņ	L‌̧	l‌̧	N‌̧	n‌̧	Ḷ	ḷ	Ṃ	ṃ	Ṇ	ṇ	Ñ	ñ	Ọ	ọ
Gentium Basic	Ā	ā	Ļ	ļ	M̧	m̧	Ņ	ņ	N̄	n̄	O̧	o̧	Ō	ō	Ū	ū	Ļ	ļ	Ņ	ņ	L‌̧	l‌̧	N‌̧	n‌̧	Ḷ	ḷ	Ṃ	ṃ	Ṇ	ṇ	Ñ	ñ	Ọ	ọ
Gentium Book Basic	Ā	ā	Ļ	ļ	M̧	m̧	Ņ	ņ	N̄	n̄	O̧	o̧	Ō	ō	Ū	ū	Ļ	ļ	Ņ	ņ	L‌̧	l‌̧	N‌̧	n‌̧	Ḷ	ḷ	Ṃ	ṃ	Ṇ	ṇ	Ñ	ñ	Ọ	ọ
Gentium Plus	Ā	ā	Ļ	ļ	M̧	m̧	Ņ	ņ	N̄	n̄	O̧	o̧	Ō	ō	Ū	ū	Ļ	ļ	Ņ	ņ	L‌̧	l‌̧	N‌̧	n‌̧	Ḷ	ḷ	Ṃ	ṃ	Ṇ	ṇ	Ñ	ñ	Ọ	ọ
Inconsolata	Ā	ā	Ļ	ļ	M̧	m̧	Ņ	ņ	N̄	n̄	O̧	o̧	Ō	ō	Ū	ū	Ļ	ļ	Ņ	ņ	L‌̧	l‌̧	N‌̧	n‌̧	Ḷ	ḷ	Ṃ	ṃ	Ṇ	ṇ	Ñ	ñ	Ọ	ọ
Junicode	Ā	ā	Ļ	ļ	M̧	m̧	Ņ	ņ	N̄	n̄	O̧	o̧	Ō	ō	Ū	ū	Ļ	ļ	Ņ	ņ	L‌̧	l‌̧	N‌̧	n‌̧	Ḷ	ḷ	Ṃ	ṃ	Ṇ	ṇ	Ñ	ñ	Ọ	ọ
Linux Libertine	Ā	ā	Ļ	ļ	M̧	m̧	Ņ	ņ	N̄	n̄	O̧	o̧	Ō	ō	Ū	ū	Ļ	ļ	Ņ	ņ	L‌̧	l‌̧	N‌̧	n‌̧	Ḷ	ḷ	Ṃ	ṃ	Ṇ	ṇ	Ñ	ñ	Ọ	ọ
Lucida Sans Unicode	Ā	ā	Ļ	ļ	M̧	m̧	Ņ	ņ	N̄	n̄	O̧	o̧	Ō	ō	Ū	ū	Ļ	ļ	Ņ	ņ	L‌̧	l‌̧	N‌̧	n‌̧	Ḷ	ḷ	Ṃ	ṃ	Ṇ	ṇ	Ñ	ñ	Ọ	ọ
Noto Sans	Ā	ā	Ļ	ļ	M̧	m̧	Ņ	ņ	N̄	n̄	O̧	o̧	Ō	ō	Ū	ū	Ļ	ļ	Ņ	ņ	L‌̧	l‌̧	N‌̧	n‌̧	Ḷ	ḷ	Ṃ	ṃ	Ṇ	ṇ	Ñ	ñ	Ọ	ọ
Noto Sans Mono	Ā	ā	Ļ	ļ	M̧	m̧	Ņ	ņ	N̄	n̄	O̧	o̧	Ō	ō	Ū	ū	Ļ	ļ	Ņ	ņ	L‌̧	l‌̧	N‌̧	n‌̧	Ḷ	ḷ	Ṃ	ṃ	Ṇ	ṇ	Ñ	ñ	Ọ	ọ
Noto Serif	Ā	ā	Ļ	ļ	M̧	m̧	Ņ	ņ	N̄	n̄	O̧	o̧	Ō	ō	Ū	ū	Ļ	ļ	Ņ	ņ	L‌̧	l‌̧	N‌̧	n‌̧	Ḷ	ḷ	Ṃ	ṃ	Ṇ	ṇ	Ñ	ñ	Ọ	ọ
Open Sans	Ā	ā	Ļ	ļ	M̧	m̧	Ņ	ņ	N̄	n̄	O̧	o̧	Ō	ō	Ū	ū	Ļ	ļ	Ņ	ņ	L‌̧	l‌̧	N‌̧	n‌̧	Ḷ	ḷ	Ṃ	ṃ	Ṇ	ṇ	Ñ	ñ	Ọ	ọ
Segoe UI	Ā	ā	Ļ	ļ	M̧	m̧	Ņ	ņ	N̄	n̄	O̧	o̧	Ō	ō	Ū	ū	Ļ	ļ	Ņ	ņ	L‌̧	l‌̧	N‌̧	n‌̧	Ḷ	ḷ	Ṃ	ṃ	Ṇ	ṇ	Ñ	ñ	Ọ	ọ
Source Code Pro	Ā	ā	Ļ	ļ	M̧	m̧	Ņ	ņ	N̄	n̄	O̧	o̧	Ō	ō	Ū	ū	Ļ	ļ	Ņ	ņ	L‌̧	l‌̧	N‌̧	n‌̧	Ḷ	ḷ	Ṃ	ṃ	Ṇ	ṇ	Ñ	ñ	Ọ	ọ
Source Sans Pro	Ā	ā	Ļ	ļ	M̧	m̧	Ņ	ņ	N̄	n̄	O̧	o̧	Ō	ō	Ū	ū	Ļ	ļ	Ņ	ņ	L‌̧	l‌̧	N‌̧	n‌̧	Ḷ	ḷ	Ṃ	ṃ	Ṇ	ṇ	Ñ	ñ	Ọ	ọ
Source Serif Pro	Ā	ā	Ļ	ļ	M̧	m̧	Ņ	ņ	N̄	n̄	O̧	o̧	Ō	ō	Ū	ū	Ļ	ļ	Ņ	ņ	L‌̧	l‌̧	N‌̧	n‌̧	Ḷ	ḷ	Ṃ	ṃ	Ṇ	ṇ	Ñ	ñ	Ọ	ọ
Tahoma	Ā	ā	Ļ	ļ	M̧	m̧	Ņ	ņ	N̄	n̄	O̧	o̧	Ō	ō	Ū	ū	Ļ	ļ	Ņ	ņ	L‌̧	l‌̧	N‌̧	n‌̧	Ḷ	ḷ	Ṃ	ṃ	Ṇ	ṇ	Ñ	ñ	Ọ	ọ
Times New Roman	Ā	ā	Ļ	ļ	M̧	m̧	Ņ	ņ	N̄	n̄	O̧	o̧	Ō	ō	Ū	ū	Ļ	ļ	Ņ	ņ	L‌̧	l‌̧	N‌̧	n‌̧	Ḷ	ḷ	Ṃ	ṃ	Ṇ	ṇ	Ñ	ñ	Ọ	ọ

=== Differences in orthography ===
The old orthography was still very similar to the new orthography but made fewer phonological distinctions in spelling than the new orthography does. The new orthography attempts phonological consistency while adhering to most of the spelling patterns of the old orthography, especially in regard to vowels and w. It has made the new orthography relatively easy for old orthography users to learn. The phonology of Marshallese was documented by Bender (1969) with written examples using the old orthography. Here are some differences between the new and old orthographies:

- The new orthography uses the cedillaed letters ḷ ṃ ṇ ọ. The old orthography did not use cedillas and ambiguously wrote them l m n o.
- The new orthography uses p for "light" /pʲ/ and b for "heavy" /pˠ/. The old orthography used b for both.
  Compare old binjel vs. new pinjeḷ [pʲinzʲɛlˠ], 'pencil'.
- The new orthography consistently uses d for "light" /rʲ/ in all positions. The old orthography often wrote dr before vowels, and r after vowels.
  Compare old Amerka vs. new Amedka [ɑmʲɛrʲɛ̆ɡɑ], 'United States'.
  Compare old indreo or indrio vs. new indeeo [inrʲeːɔ], 'forever'.
- Except in certain affixes like -an whose spelling may be fixed, the new orthography spells the vowel monophthong allophone [æ] as ā in all positions. The old orthography had ā, but it was relatively less common, and [æ] was sometimes written e instead.
  Compare old Ebeje vs. new Epjā [ɛbʲɛ̆zʲæ], 'Ebeye'.
- Except in certain affixes like ri- whose the spelling of the vowels may be fixed, the new orthography spells the vowel monophthong allophone [ɯ] as ū in all positions. The old orthography spelled [ɯ] as i between consonants.
  Compare old Kirijmōj vs. new Kūrijṃōj [kɯrˠizʲĭmˠɤtʲ], 'Christmas'.
- The new orthography uses only e o ō for allophones of the vowel phoneme /e/. In the old orthography, some words used e o ō, but other words used i u (ū) instead.
  Compare old ailiñ vs. new aelōñ [ɑelʲɤŋ ~ ɑelʲeŋ], 'land'.
- The new orthography uses the letter ọ for the vowel monophthong allophone [ɒ] along with many of its related diphthong allophones. The old orthography spelt [ɒ] as a between consonants but o at the ends of words.
  Compare old iakwe vs. new iọkwe [i̯ɒɡʷɛ], 'hello; good bye; love'.
  Compare old mo vs. new mọ [mʲɒ], 'taboo'.
- The new orthography tries to consistently write long vowels and geminated consonants with double letters. The old orthography habitually wrote these as single letters.
  Compare old ekatak vs. new ekkatak [ɛkːɑdˠɑk], 'study'.
  Compare old jab vs. new jaab [tʲɑːpˠ], 'no'.
- The word iọkwe [i̯ɒɡʷɛ] ('hello; goodbye; love') and the phrase iọkwe eok [i̯ɒɡʷɛe̯okʷ] ('hello [to you]') are a special case. The new orthography's rules use iọkwe eok, while the old orthography's rules used iakwe iuk. However, yokwe yuk has been historically more entrenched in both orthographies, but the letter y does not exist in the normal spelling rules of either orthography. That spelling has multilingual significance as well; yokwe (yuk) /ˈjɒkweɪ (ˈjʊk)/ is also the established spelling for the greeting when used in Marshallese-influenced English and by anglophones in the Marshall Islands.

== Bender's orthography ==
In his 1968 publication Marshallese Phonology, linguist Byron W. Bender designed a purely morphophonemic orthography, based on the symbols found on a manual typewriter, with regular reflexes between the dialects and intended for use in dictionaries and language teaching. Besides also appearing in his 1969 tutorial Spoken Marshallese, it appeared in a modified form alongside the "new" orthography in the 1976 Marshallese-English Dictionary (MED) to which he contributed. Bender later collaborated with Stephen Trussel when the MED was adapted to website format as the Marshallese-English Online Dictionary (MOD), with Bender's orthography appearing in an again-modified form.

Phoneme	/pʲ/	/pˠ/	/tʲ/	/tˠ/	/k/	/kʷ/	/mʲ/	/mˠ/	/nʲ/	/nˠ/	/nʷ/	/ŋ/	/ŋʷ/	/rʲ/	/rˠ/	/rʷ/	/lʲ/	/lˠ/	/lʷ/	/j/	/ɰ/	/w/	/æ/	/ɛ/	/e/	/i/
Bender (1968)	p	b	j	t	k	q	m	m̍	n	n̍	n̎	g	g̎	d	r	r̎	l	ƚ	l̎	y	h	w	a	e	&	i
MED (1976)	p	b	j	t	k	q	m	m̧	n	n‌̧	n‌̧ᵒ	g	gᵒ	d	r	rᵒ	l	l‌̧	l‌̧ᵒ	y	h	w	a	e	ȩ	i
MOD	p	b	j	t	k	kʷ	m	ṃ	n	ṇ	ṇʷ	g	gʷ	d	r	rʷ	l	ḷ	ḷʷ	y	h	w	a	e	ẹ	i

The MOD's version of Bender's orthography uses under-dot diacritics instead of the cedillas used both by the "new" orthography and by the 1976 MED's version of Bender's orthography, for reasons specific to the MOD's display issues.

In addition to plain sequences of phonemes, Bender's orthography recognizes a few special sequences, many of which relate to regular differences between the Rālik and Ratak dialects of Marshallese.

- {yiꞌy} is for a "passing over lightly" version of the vowel allophone i that occurs at the beginning of certain words, phonetically pronounced [i̯] and existing on the phonemic level as /ji̯j/. For example, {yiꞌyakʷey} is equivalent to iọkwe [i̯ɒɡʷɛ] /ji̯jækʷɛj/ "hello; goodbye; love".
- {ꞌyiy} is for a "dwelling upon" version of i that occurs at the beginning of certain words, now generally written ii in the "new" orthography, phonetically pronounced [iː] and existing on the phonemic level as /jijj/, effectively making it identical to {yiyy}. An example is {ꞌyiyayiyȩw}, which is equivalent to iiāio [iːæio] /jijjæjijew/ "reunion".
- {yiy} at the beginning of a word, without apostrophes, indicates a version of i whose reflex differs between the two dialects. In the Rālik dialect, this assumes the "dwelling upon" pronunciation, equivalent to {ꞌyiy}. In the Ratak dialect, it instead assumes the "passing over lightly" pronunciation, equivalent to {yiꞌy}. An example is {yiyaḷ}, equivalent to iaḷ "road":
  - In the Rālik dialect, {yiyaḷ} becomes [iːɑlˠ] /jijjælˠ/ and is often instead written as iiaḷ in the "new" orthography.
  - In the Ratak dialect, {yiyaḷ} becomes [i̯ɑlˠ] /ji̯jælˠ/.
- {hhV} at the beginning of a word (where "V" can be any vowel) indicates a back unrounded vowel that whose reflex differs between the dialects. In the Rālik dialect, {hhV} becomes {hVhV}, lengthening the vowel. In the Ratak dialect, the second {h} disappears, becoming {hV}, and the vowel remains short. An example is {hhayȩt}, equivalent to aet "yes":
  - In the Rālik dialect, {hhayȩt} becomes [ɑːetˠ] /ɰæɰæjetˠ/ and is often instead written as aaet in the "new" orthography.
  - In the Ratak dialect, {hhayȩt} becomes [ɑetˠ] /ɰæjetˠ/.
- {yiwV} at the beginning of a word (where "V" can be any vowel) is usually equivalent to {yiwwV}.
- {wiwV} at the beginning of a word (where "V" can be any vowel) usually becomes {yiwwV} in the Rālik dialect, but usually becomes {wiwwV} in the Ratak dialect.
- When a Bender orthography spelling begins with a doubled consonant other than {hh}, such as {ṃṃan} "good", its reflex differs between the dialects.
  - In the Rālik dialect, {ṃṃan} becomes {yeṃṃan}, sprouting both a prothetic {y} and a vowel. The dialect generally spells this eṃṃan [ɛmˠːɑnʲ] /jemˠmˠænʲ/ "good" in the "new" orthography, making it homophonous with the phrase eṃṃan which means "it is good" in both dialects.
  - In the Ratak dialect, {ṃṃan} becomes {ṃeṃan} with only a prothetic vowel, appearing instead between the two consonants. The dialect generally spells this ṃōṃan [mˠʌmˠɑnʲ] /mˠɛmˠænʲ/ "good" in the "new" orthography.
  - In both dialects, the prothetic vowel is equivalent to the first stem vowel unless it is {a}, in which case the stem vowel is always paired with the prothetic vowel {e}. But when spellings like {ṃṃan} take prefixes with a vowel, there are no prothetic vowels: {ri-} "person" + {ṃṃan} "good" becomes {riṃṃan} /rˠi-mˠmˠænʲ/ [rˠɯmˠːɑnʲ], which the "new" orthography spells rūṃṃan "good person".

== Grammar ==
=== Morphology ===
Nouns are not overtly marked as such, and do not inflect for number, gender, or case. Nouns are often verbalized and verbs nominalized without any overt morphological marker:

Je-n al al in pālle.
1PL.IN.AGR-should sing.TR song of be.covered(=American)
'We should sing American songs.' (Willson 2008)

Marshallese has determiners and demonstratives which follow the noun they modify. These are marked for number, and in the plural also encode a human/nonhuman distinction. For example, in the singular pinjeḷ eo 'the pencil' and ḷaddik eo 'the boy' take the same determiner, but in the plural pinjeḷ ko 'the pencils' and ḷaddik ro have different determiners. Indefinites are an exception; in the singular they are expressed with the word juon 'one' before the noun (e.g. juon al 'a song'), and there is no plural indefinite determiner.

The Marshallese demonstrative system has five levels:

1. near the speaker (sg. e / pl. human rā / pl. nonhuman kā)
2. near the speaker and listener (in / rein / kein)
3. near the listener (ṇe / raṇe / kaṇe)
4. away from both speaker and listener (eṇ / raṇ / kaṇ)
5. distant but visible (uweo / roro / koko).

Marshallese pronouns
Person			absolutive / emphatic	objective
s	1		ña	eō
s	2		kwe	eok
s	3		e	
pl	1	inc	kōj	
pl	1	exc	kōm	
pl	2		koṃ (Rālik) koṃi (Ratak)	
pl	3		er	

Marshallese possesses two sets of 1st and 2nd person singular pronouns, known as "absolutive" or "emphatic" pronouns and as "objective" pronouns. Marshallese 1st person plurals mark for clusivity. Third person objective pronouns may only be used for humans; nonhumans instead take a null pronoun:

E-ar deñōt er.
3S.AGR-PAST slap.TR 3PL.OBJ
'He slapped them (human).' (Willson 2008)

E-ar deñōt-i.
3S.AGR-PAST slap.TR-OBJ
'He slapped them (nonhuman).' (Willson 2008)

The emphatic pronouns serve as subjects of equational sentences, as complements of prepositions, in order to emphasize objects, in coordination structures, and with topicalized or focused subjects. It is common in Oceanic languages for a special type of pronoun to be used in equational sentences and for topicalization or focus.

Ña rikaki.
1S.EMPH teacher
'I am a teacher.' (Willson 2008)

Ña i-j yokwe ajiri ro nej-ū.
1S.EMPH 1S.AGR.PRES love child the.PL.HUM CHER.POSS-1S.GEN
'Me, I love my children.' (Willson 2008)

Marshallese has four verb tenses: present, past, near future, and future. The tenses are formed by adding a tense suffix to the personal pronoun in the sentence. If the subject is not a personal pronoun, a third-person pronoun is added with the appropriate tense suffix. The present tense is formed by attaching the suffix -j to the personal pronoun (-ij for kōm and koṃ). The suffix for the past tense is either -ar or -kar depending on the dialect. -naaj is the suffix used for the regular future tense and -itōn is used for the near future.

=== Syntax ===
Marshallese, like many Micronesian languages, divides sentences into two types: predicational sentences and equational sentences. Predicational sentences have SVO word order and a main verb:

E-j kajañjañ kita.
3S-PRES play guitar.
'He plays guitar.' (Willson 2002)

In equational sentences, both the subject and predicate are noun phrases:

Nuknuk eo e-aibujuij.
dress DET 3S-beautiful.
'The dress is beautiful.' (Willson 2002)

== Vocabulary ==
Marshallese vocabulary
(Rālik) aaet; (Ratak) aet	[ɑːetˠ, ɑetˠ]	Yes
aelōñ	[ɑelʲɤŋ]	Atoll, or island; the word for land in general
ej et aṃ mour	[ɛzʲeːdˠɑːmmʲourˠ]	How are you? (Literally, "How is your life doing?") Notice that the ṃ assimilates before the m.
eṃṃan	[ɛmmˠɑnʲ]	(It) is good.
enana	[ɛnʲɑːnʲɑ]	(It) is bad.
iọkwe; yokwe	[i̯ɒɡwɛ]	Hello, goodbye and love, similar to the Hawaiian aloha; also an expression of sympathy.
irwōj; irooj	[irˠ(u)wɤtʲ, irˠoːtʲ]	Iroij, the various paramount chieftains of Marshallese culture
jaab	[tʲɑːpʲ]	No.
koṃṃool tata	[kʷɔmmˠɔːltˠɑːdˠɑ]	Thank you very much. Koṃṃool alone means "thank you".
kōn jouj	[kɤnzʲoutʲ]	You're welcome. Literally "for kindness".
Kūrjin	[kɯrˠ(i)zʲinʲ]	Christian: The majority religion of the Marshall Islands

=== Cardinal numbers ===
This includes the cardinal numbers one through ten in the Rālik dialect. Where Ratak forms differ, they are listed in parentheses.

1. juon [tʲuɔnʲ]
2. ruo [rˠuɔ]
3. jilu [tʲilʲu]
4. emān [ɛmʲænʲ]
5. ḷalem [lˠɑlʲemʲ]
6. jiljino [tʲizʲinʲɔ] (the l is silent)
7. jimjuon [tʲimʲ(i)zʲuɔnʲ]
8. ralitōk [rˠɑːlʲiːdˠɤk] (ejino)
9. ratimjuon [rˠɑːdˠimʲ(i)zʲuɔnʲ] (ejilimjuon)
10. joñoul [tʲoŋʷoulʲ]

=== Months ===
1. Jānwōde [tʲænʲ(ɔ)wɔrˠɛ], 'January'
2. Pāpode [pʲæbʲɔːrˠɛ], 'February'
3. Ṃaaj [mˠɑːtʲ], 'March'
4. Eprōḷ [ɛbʲ(ɛ)rˠʌlˠ], 'April'
5. Māe [mʲæe], 'May'
6. Juun [tʲuːnʲ], 'June'
7. Juḷae [tʲuːlˠɑːɛ], 'July'
8. Ọkwōj [ɒɡwʌtʲ], 'August'
9. Jeptōṃba [tʲɛbʲ(ɛ)dˠʌmbˠɑ], also Jebtōṃba [tʲɛbˠ(ʌ)dˠʌmbˠɑ], 'September'
10. Oktoba [wɔɡ(ʌ)dˠɔːbˠɑ], 'October'
11. Nobōṃba [nʲɔːbˠʌmbˠɑ], also Nopeṃba [nʲɔːbʲɛmbˠɑ], 'November'
12. Tijeṃba [tˠiːzʲɛmbˠɑ], 'December'

=== Weekdays ===
1. Jabōt [tʲɑbˠʌtˠ], 'Sunday; Sabbath'
2. Ṃande [mˠɑnrʲɛ], 'Monday'
3. Juje [tʲuːzʲɛ], 'Tuesday'
4. Wōnje [wʌnzʲɛ], 'Wednesday'
5. Taije [tˠɑːizʲɛ], 'Thursday'
6. Bōraide [pˠʌrˠɑːirʲɛ], also Bōḷaide [pˠʌlˠɑːirʲɛ], also Būḷāide [pˠɯlˠæirʲɛ], 'Friday'
7. Jādede [tʲærʲɛːrʲɛ], 'Saturday'

=== Marshallese atolls and islands ===
- Ṃajeḷ or Ṃajōḷ [mˠɑːzʲɛlˠ], 'Marshall Islands'
  - Ratak [rˠɑːdˠɑk], 'Ratak Chain'
    - Aelok [ɑelʲokʷ], 'Ailuk Atoll'
    - Arṇo [ɑnnˠɔ], 'Arno Atoll'
    - Aur [ɑurˠ], 'Aur Atoll'
    - Ādkup [ærʲ(u)ɡʷupʲ], 'Erikub Atoll'
    - Bokaak or Bok-ak [pˠɔɡwɑːk], 'Bokak (Taongi) Atoll'
    - Jāmọ [tʲæːmʲɒ], 'Jemo Island'
    - Likiep [lʲiɡiɛpʲ], 'Likiep Atoll'
    - Mājeej [mʲæzʲɛːtʲ] or Mājej [mʲæzʲɛːtʲ], 'Mejit Island'
    - Mājro [mʲæzʲ(e)rˠo], 'Majuro Atoll'
      - Jarōj [tʲɑrˠʌtʲ], 'Djarrit'
      - Ḷora [lˠɔːrˠɑ], 'Laura'
      - Teḷap [tˠɛːlˠɑpʲ], 'Delap'
      - Wūlka [wɯlʲ(i)ɡɑ], 'Uliga'
    - Mile [mʲilʲe], 'Mili Atoll'
    - Ṃaḷo-eḷap [mˠɑlˠɔːɛlˠɑpʲ], 'Maloelap Atoll'
    - Ṇa-dikdik [nˠɑːrʲiɡ(i)rʲik], 'Knox Atoll'
    - Pikaar [pʲiɡɑːrˠ], 'Bikar Atoll'
    - Tōkā [tˠʌɡæ], 'Toke (Taka) Atoll'
    - Utrōk [wudˠ(ɯ)rˠɤk], 'Utirik Atoll'
    - Wōjjā [wʌttʲæ], 'Wotje Atoll'
  - Rālik [rˠæːlʲik], 'Ralik Chain'
    - Aelōñin-ae [ɑelʲɤŋinʲɑːɛ], 'Ailinginae Atoll'
    - Aelōñḷapḷap [ɑelʲɤŋ(ɤ)lˠɑbʲ(ɛ)lˠɑpʲ], 'Ailinglaplap Atoll'
    - Āne-wātak [ænʲeːwæːdˠɑk], also Ānewetak [ænʲeːwɛːdˠɑk], 'Enewetak (Eniwetok) Atoll'
    - Ellep [ɛllʲɛpʲ], 'Lib Island'
    - Epoon [ɛbʲɔːnʲ], 'Ebon Atoll'
    - Jālwōj [tʲælʲ(o)wɤtʲ] or Jālooj [tʲælʲoːtʲ], 'Jaluit Atoll'
      - Jebwad [tʲɛbˠ(ɔ)wɑrʲ], 'Jabor Island'
    - Jebat [tʲɛbˠɑtˠ], 'Jabat (Jabot, Jabwot) Island'
    - Kōle [kɤlʲe], 'Kili Island'
    - Kuwajleen [kʷuwɑzʲ(ɛ)lʲɛːnʲ], 'Kwajalein Atoll'
      - Epjā [ɛbʲ(ɛ)zʲæ], also Ibae [ibˠɑːɛ], 'Ebeye Island'
    - Lae [lʲɑːɛ], 'Lae Atoll'
    - Naṃdik [nʲɑmˠ(wi)rʲik], 'Namdrik (Namorik) Atoll'
    - Naṃo [nʲɑmˠo], 'Namu Atoll'
    - Pikinni [pʲiɡinnʲi], 'Bikini Atoll'
    - Roñdik [rʷɔŋʷ(ɯ)rʲik], 'Rongerik (Rongdrik) Atoll'
    - Roñḷap [rʷɔŋʷ(ɔ)lˠɑpʲ], 'Rongelap Atoll'
    - Wōtto [wʌttˠɔ], 'Wotho Atoll'
    - Wūjae or Ujae [wɯzʲɑːɛ], 'Ujae Atoll'
    - Wūjlañ or Ujlañ [wɯzʲ(i)lʲɑŋ], 'Ujelang Atoll'
  - Āneen-kio [ænʲeːnʲ(i)ɡiɔ], 'Wake (Enenkio) Atoll' (claimed by the Marshall Islands, administered by the United States)

=== Other countries and places ===
- Amedka [ɑmʲɛrʲ(ɛ)ɡɑ], 'United States (America)'
  - Awai [ɑwɑːi], 'Hawaii', where a Marshallese diaspora lives
  - Kalboonea [kɑlʲ(ʌ)bˠɔːnʲɛ̯ɑ], 'California', where a Marshallese diaspora lives
  - Ọkōnjọ [ɒɡwʌnzʲɒ], 'Arkansas', where a large Marshallese diaspora lives
- Aujtōrōlia [ɑuttˠʌrˠʌlʲiɑ], 'Australia'
- Eijia [eizʲiɑ], 'Asia'
  - Jaina [tʲɑːinʲɑ], also Jāina [tʲæinʲɑ], also Jeina [tʲeinʲɑ], 'China'
  - Jepaan [tʲɛbʲɑːnʲ], also Nibboñ [nʲippˠɔŋʷ], 'Japan (Nippon)', former colonial ruler
  - Kuria [kʷurˠiɑ], 'Korea'
  - Pilipin [pʲilʲibʲinʲ], 'Philippines', former colonial administrator under Spanish rule
  - Rojia [rʷoːzʲiɑ], 'Russia'
  - Taiwan [tˠɑːiwɑnʲ], 'Taiwan'
- Iñlen [iŋ(i)lʲɛnʲ], 'England'
- Jaṃuwa [tʲɑːmˠuːwɑ], 'Samoa'
- Jāmne [tʲæmʲ(ɛ)nʲɛ], 'Germany', former colonial ruler
- Jipein [tʲibʲeinʲ], 'Spain', former colonial ruler
- Ṃaikronijia [mˠɑːiɡ(u)rʷɔnʲizʲiɑ], 'Micronesia'
  - Karoḷāin [kɑrˠɔːlˠæinʲ], 'Caroline Islands'
    - Bōḷau [pˠʌlˠɑːu], also Bōḷao [pˠʌlˠɑːɔ], 'Palau'
    - FSM [ɛbʲɛzʲɛmʲ], 'Federated States of Micronesia (F.S.M.)'
      - Boonpe [pˠoːnʲ(e)bʲe], 'Pohnpei (Ponape)'
      - Iaab [i̯ɑːpˠ], 'Yap'
      - Kujjae [kʷuttʲɑːɛ], also Kōjae [kʌzʲɑːɛ], 'Kosrae (Kusaie)'
      - Ruk [rˠukʷ], 'Chuuk (Truk)'
  - Kilbōt [kilʲ(i)bˠʌtˠ], 'Kiribati (Gilbert Islands)'
  - Ṃadianna [mʲærʲiɑːnnʲɑ], 'Mariana Islands'
    - Jāipaan [tʲæibʲɑːnʲ], 'Saipan'
    - Kuwaaṃ [kʷuwɑːmˠ], 'Guam'
  - Nawōdo [nʲɑːwʌrʲɔ], 'Nauru (Naoero)'
- Mejjiko [mʲɛttʲiɡɔ], 'Mexico', former colonial administrator under Spanish rule
- Nijiiḷōn [nʲuːzʲiːlˠʌnʲ], 'New Zealand'
- Nukne [nʲuɡʷ(u)nʲe], also [nʲuɡʷ(u)nʲɛ], 'New Guinea', former colonial administrator under German rule
- Piji [pʲiːzʲi], 'Fiji'
- Tubaḷu [tˠuːbˠɑːlˠu], 'Tuvalu'

== Text examples ==
=== Modern orthography ===
Here is the Hail Mary in standard Marshallese orthography:

Iọkwe eok Maria, kwo lōñ kōn
menin jouj;
Irooj ej pād ippaṃ.
Kwo jeraṃṃan iaan kōrā raṇ im
ejeraṃṃan ineen lọjiōṃ, Jesus.
O Maria kwojarjar, jinen Anij,
kwōn jar kōn kem rijjerawiwi.
Kiiō im ilo iien
amwōj mej. Amen.

=== Older orthography ===
Here is the Lord's Prayer from the 1982 Marshallese Bible, which uses the older orthography:

Jememuij iljōn̄:
En kwojarjar im utiej etam;
En itok am Ailin̄;
Kimin kōmōnmōn ankilam ilōl einwōt air kōmmōn ilōn.
Letok n̄ōn kim kijim rainin.
Jolok amuij bwid ibbam,
Einwōt kimij julok bwid ko an ro jet ibbem.
Am melejjon̄e kim en jab ellā jen jon̄an,
Ak kwon kejbarok kim jen Eo Enana.
Bwe am Ailin̄ im kajur im aibuijuij indrio, Amen.

== Bibliography ==
- Abo, Takaji; Bender, Byron; Capelle, Alfred; DeBrum, Tony (1976). Marshallese–English Dictionary. University Press of Hawaiʻi.
- Bender, Byron (1968). "Marshallese Phonology". Oceanic Linguistics. 7 (1): 16–35. doi:10.2307/3622845. JSTOR 3622845.
- Bender, Byron (1969). Spoken Marshallese: an intensive language course with grammatical notes and glossary. Honolulu: University of Hawaii Press. ISBN 0-87022-070-5.
- Bender, Byron W.; Goodenough, Ward H.; Jackson, Frederick H.; Marck, Jeffrey C.; Rehg, Kenneth L.; Sohn, Ho-min; Trussel, Stephen; Wang, Judith W. (2003). "Proto-Micronesian Reconstructions: I". Oceanic Linguistics. 42 (1): 1–110. doi:10.2307/3623449. JSTOR 3623449.
- Choi, John (1992). "Phonetic Underspecification and Target Interpolation: An Acoustic Study of Marshallese Vowel Allophony". Working Papers in Phonetics. 82. Los Angeles: UCLA.
- Miller, Rachel (2010). Wa kuk wa jimor: Outrigger canoes, social change, and modern life in the Marshall Islands. University of Hawai’i. hdl:10125/21114.
- Rudiak-Gould, Peter (2004). Practical Marshallese (PDF). WorldTeach.
- Willson, Heather (2002), The Marshallese Complementizer Phrase (PDF), Arizona State University, archived from the original (PDF) on 2016-03-04
- Willson, Heather (2003). A Brief Introduction to Marshallese Phonology (PDF). Archived from the original (PDF) on 2024-06-16.
- Willson, Heather (2008). Subject Positions in Marshallese (PDF). University of California, Los Angeles. Archived from the original (PDF) on 2011-11-13.
