= Rongerik Atoll =

Coral atoll in the Pacific Ocean

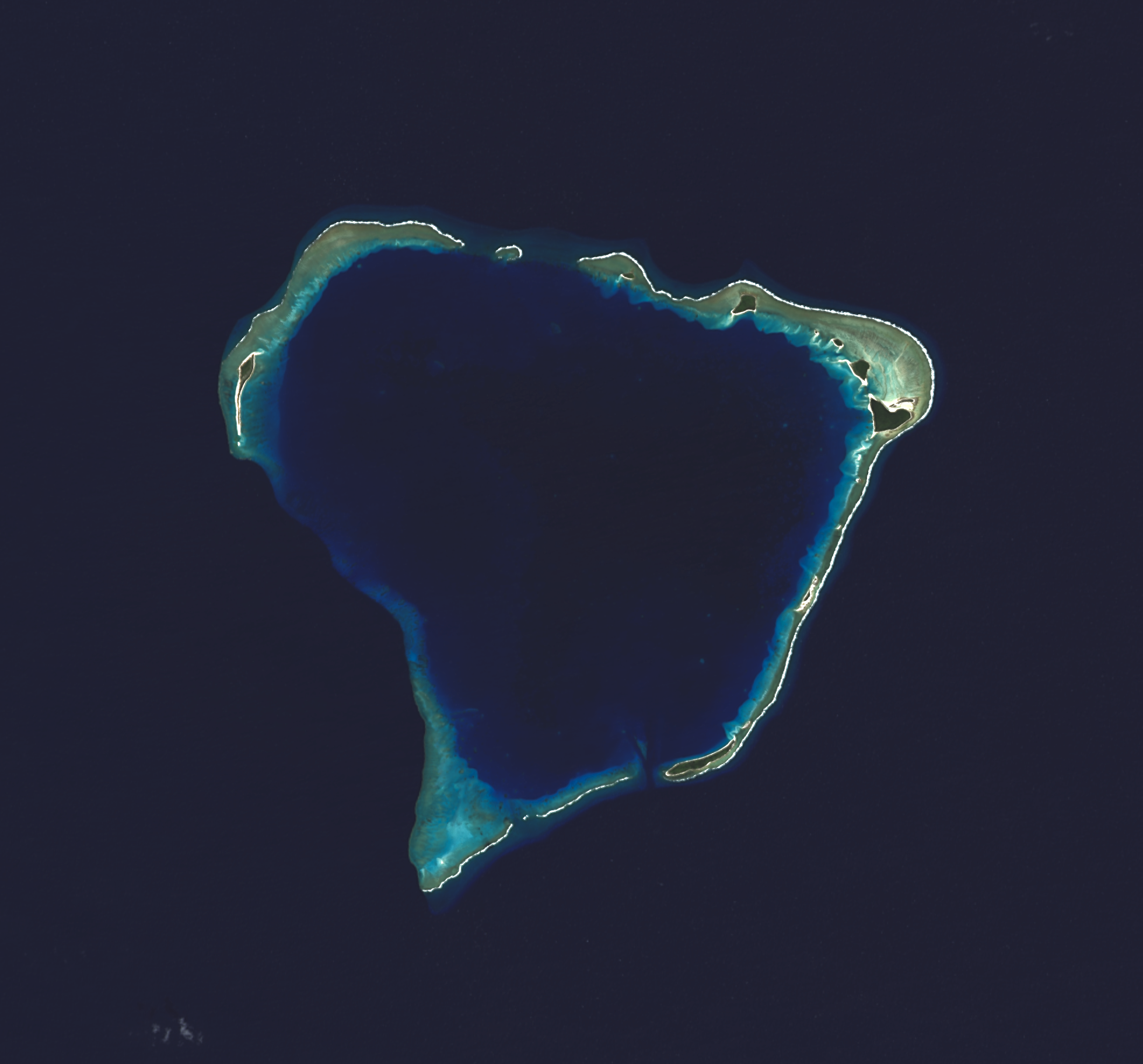
- NASA picture of Rongerik Atoll

- Location within Marshall Islands

Geography
- Location: North Pacific
- Coordinates: 11°20′N 167°27′E
- Archipelago: Ralik
- Total islands: 22
- Area: 1.68 km^{2} (0.65 sq mi)
- Highest elevation: 3 m (10 ft)

Administration
- Marshall Islands

Demographics
- Population: 0
- Ethnic groups: Marshallese (formerly)

Rongerik Atoll or Rongdrik Atoll (Marshallese: Ron̄dik, [rʷɔŋʷ(ɯ)rʲik]) is an unpopulated coral atoll of 17 islands in the Pacific Ocean, and is located in the Ralik Chain of the Marshall Islands, approximately 200 kilometers (120 mi) east of Bikini Atoll. Its total land area is only 1.68 square kilometers (0.65 sq mi), but it encloses a lagoon of 144 square kilometers (56 sq mi).

In 1946, Rongerik was briefly inhabited by Bikini Islanders who, working with United States Navy moved here temporarily, when Bikini was used for conducting nuclear tests. However, the islanders could not get enough food to support the population, so after two years they had to relocate again, choosing Kili Island.

Politically it was annexed by the German Empire in 1885, then seized by the Japanese in WW1, then the United States took it during WW2. After WW2, it was part of a United Nations trust territory. Eventually it became part of the Marshall Islands, an island nation founded in 1986, but with a compact of association with the United States.

== History ==
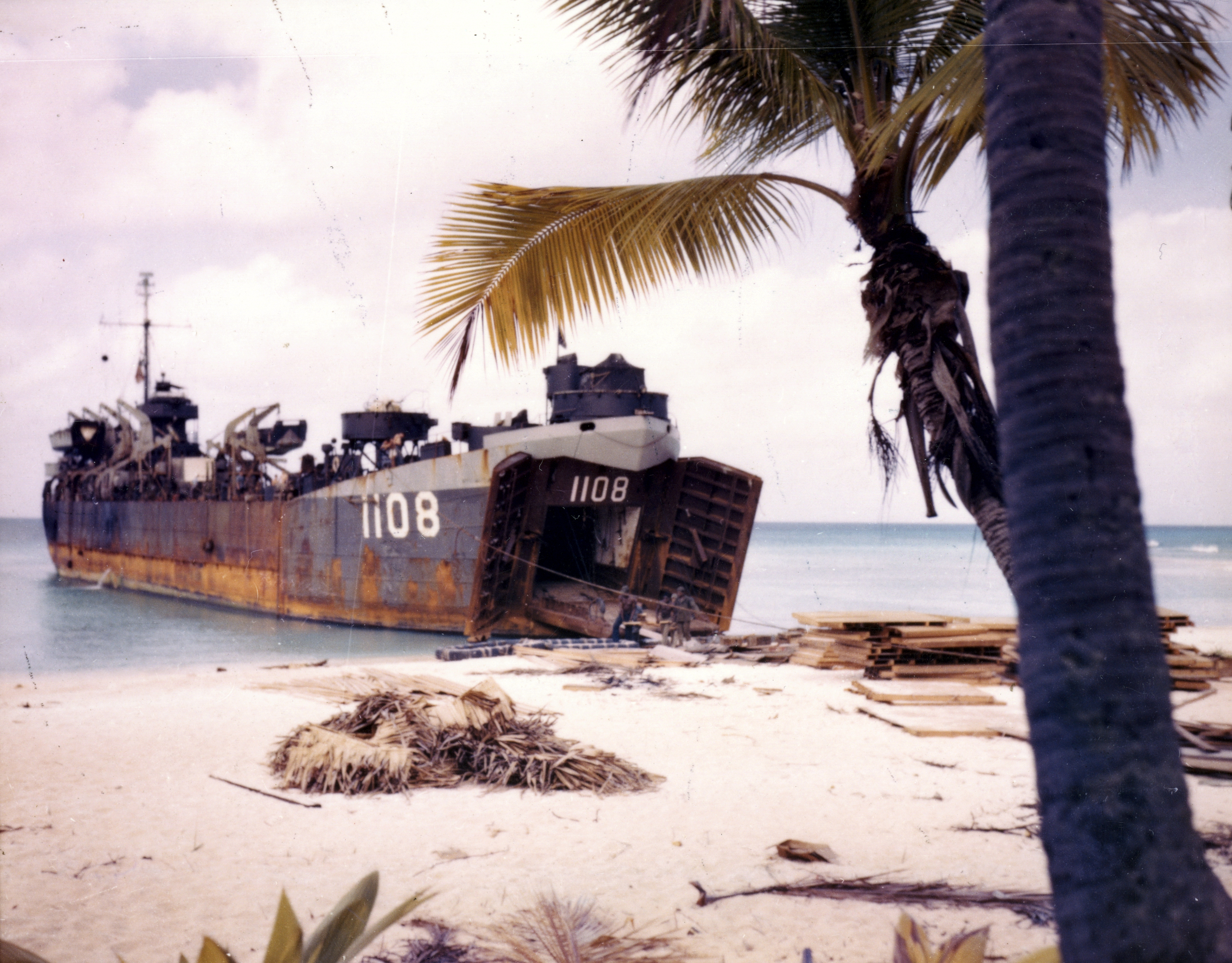
An American LST at Rongerik in March 1946

Rongerik Atoll was claimed by the German Empire along with the rest of the Marshall Islands in 1885. After World War I, the island came under the South Seas Mandate of the Empire of Japan, although the island was uninhabited. The island became part of the vast US Naval Base Marshall Islands. Following the end of World War II, it came under the control of the United States as part of the Trust Territory of the Pacific Islands until the independence of the Marshall Islands in 1986.

It is most famous as the temporary location, from March 7, 1946 until March 14, 1948, of the Bikini Atoll's indigenous population while the United States government conducted the Operation Crossroads nuclear tests. After months of food shortages and malnutrition, they were moved first to Kwajalein and finally to Kili Island. On March 1, 1954, Rongerik was exposed to radioactive fallout as a result of the detonation of Operation Castle's Bravo.

According to Spanish researcher Emilio Pastor in a paper submitted to his government in 1948, a number of small islands in Micronesia (Kapingamarangi or Pescadores, Mapia or Güedes, Kiritimati or Matador, Rongerik or Coroa and others) continue legally under Spanish sovereignty. This is because the text of the German–Spanish Treaty of 1899 which transferred sovereignty of certain Spanish possessions in the Pacific to Germany, namely the Northern Mariana Islands (except Guam) and the Caroline Islands (including Palau), failed to include these smaller islands. Although the Spanish government studied the case in 1949 and accepted this interpretation, it has not asserted its claim to the islands.

== See also ==
- Also contaminated by Castle Bravo test: Rongelap Atoll, Utirik Atoll, Ailinginae Atoll
- Desert island
- List of islands
