= Jeton Anjain =

Marshallese politician

- Born: March 25, 1933; Jaluit Atoll
- Died: 1993 (aged 59–60)
- Occupations: Dentist, senator
- Known for: Struggle against United States nuclear policy, support for Rongelap community after radiation exposure
- Awards: Right Livelihood Award, Goldman Environmental Prize

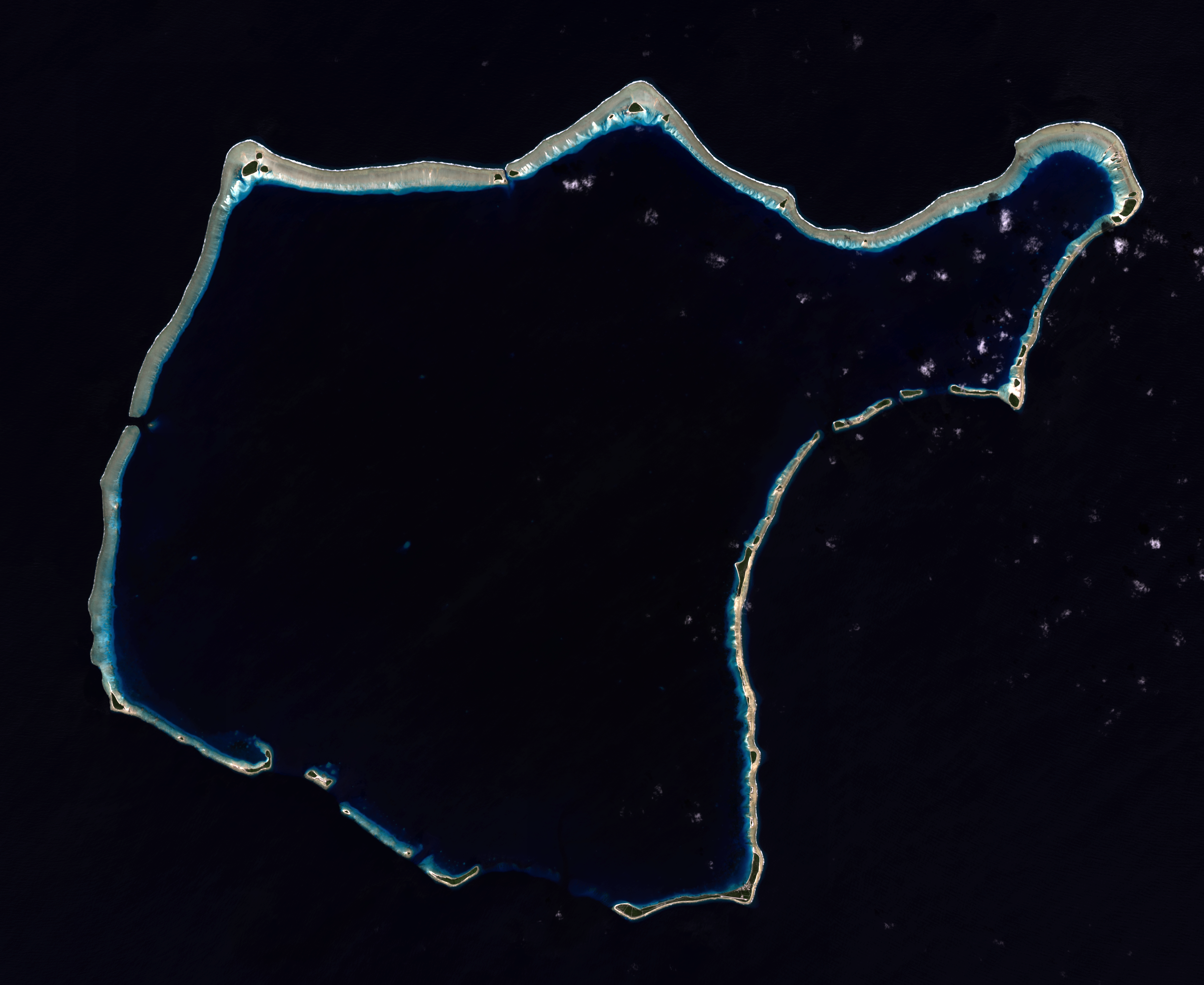
Rongelap Atoll

Jeton Anjain (25 March 1933 – 1993) was a minister of health and a senator of the Marshall Islands Legislature. He received the Goldman Environmental Prize in 1992, for his efforts to help people from Rongelap Atoll, which was subject to nuclear contamination after the Castle Bravo hydrogen bomb test in 1954. In 1991, he and the Rongelap people were awarded the Right Livelihood Award for "their steadfast struggle against United States nuclear policy in support of their right to live on an unpolluted Rongelap island."

== Career ==
Jeton Anjain was trained as a dentist. He was appointed Marshallese Health Minister, but resigned in order to work for the Rongelap community, and seek assistance in evacuating the atoll as well as justice for the islanders as a senator of the Legislature of the Marshall Islands.

== Rongelap Atoll rescue ==
Anjain carried out the evacuation of Rongelap in 1985 to Mejato island in Kwajalein Atoll with the help of Greenpeace. The people of Rongelap, a community of about 250, were afflicted with medical conditions and diseases such as growth retardation, thyroid tumours, cancer and unformed fetuses because of radiation exposure.

After the 1954 Castle Bravo test of the hydrogen bomb by the US in the South Pacific, the Rongelap people left the atoll for 3 years. They were assured by US authorities in 1956 that it would be safe to settle again in the area because they would not be exposed to radiation anymore. In fact, the islanders were exposed to highly-radioactive fallout because of the wind blowing in the direction of Rongelap Atoll on the day of the test. According to a study carried out by the US Department of Energy in 1982, the level of contamination of the soil, water and food was higher than in Bikini Atoll, where the bomb testing took place. Inhabitants of Bikini Atoll had been evacuated from the area years before, while it was not until 1985 that people of Rongelap were permanently removed from the atoll due to Anjain's efforts. He died in 1993 due to cancer, which was probably the result of radiation exposure.

Anjain was persistent in convincing the US government to evacuate the Rongelap community, as well as making the US take responsibility for the radiation danger on the island. He lobbied the US Congress for independent radiation tests as well as recruited foreign scientists to gather scientific evidence for the inhabitants of the island. Because Anjain kept the issue alive, islanders were evacuated from the Rongelap and the US agreed to carry out a health and radiation survey in 1991.

== Awards ==
Anjain received the Goldman Environmental Prize in 1992, and was granted the Right Livelihood Award in 1991 owing to his commitment and involvement into bringing help and justice to people from Rongelap. The Right Livelihood Award Foundation granted the award to Anjain "for [his] steadfast struggle against United States nuclear policy in support of their right to live on an unpolluted Rongelap island."
