= Rongelap Atoll =

Coral atoll in the Marshall Islands

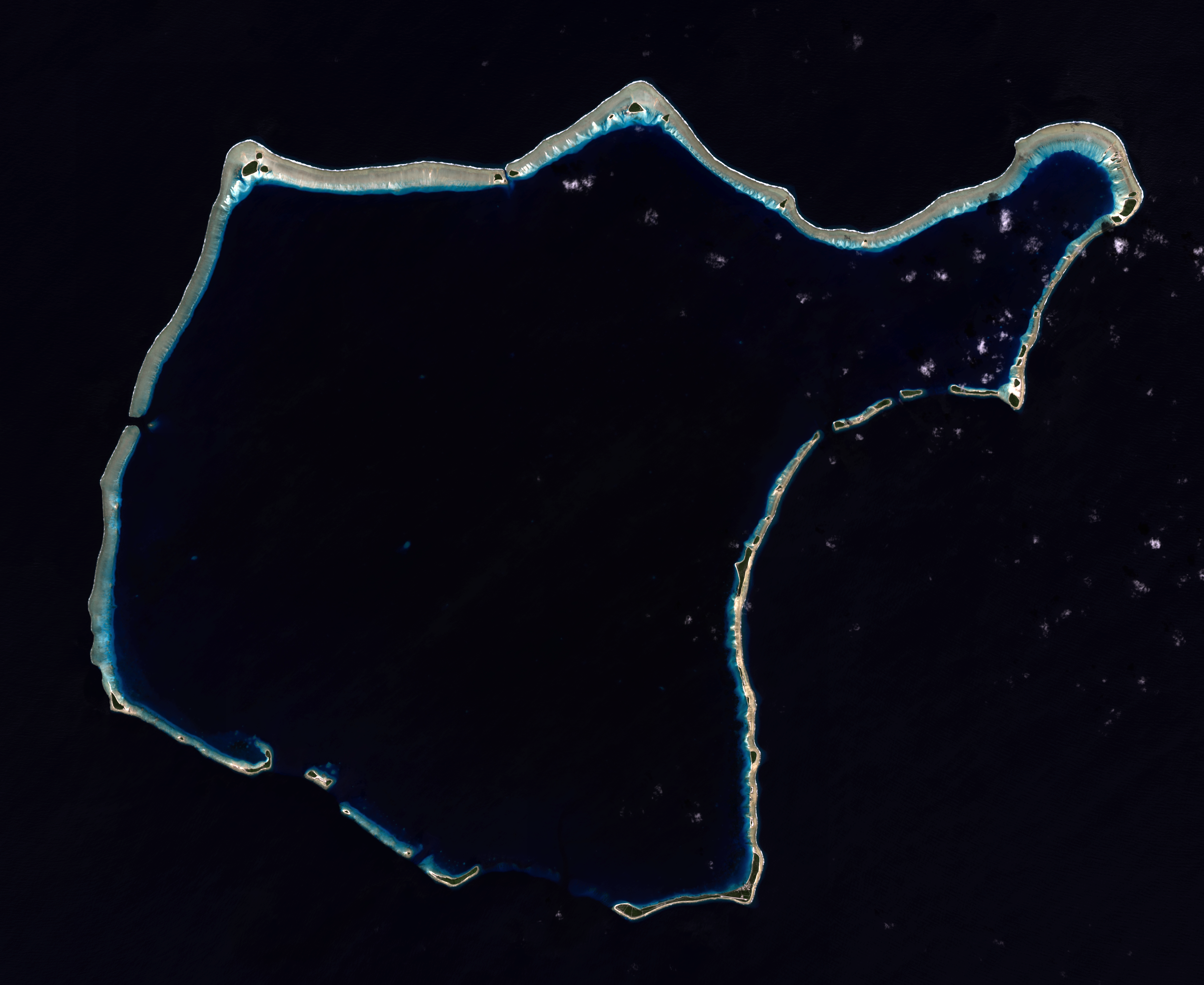
- NASA Landsat 8 image of Rongelap Atoll

- Location within Marshall Islands

Geography
- Location: North Pacific
- Coordinates: 11°19′N 166°47′E
- Archipelago: Ralik
- Total islands: 61
- Area: 21 km^{2} (8.1 sq mi)
- Highest elevation: 3 m (10 ft)

Administration
- Marshall Islands

Demographics
- Population: 0 (2021)
- Ethnic groups: Marshallese

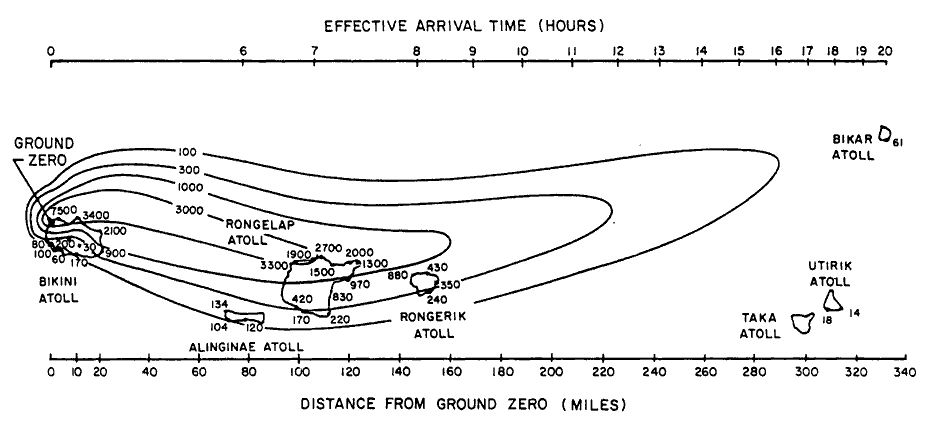
Fallout plume of 1954 nuclear test extending over Rongelap Atoll (centre). "Estimated total (accumulated) dose contours in rads at 96 hours after the BRAVO test explosion."

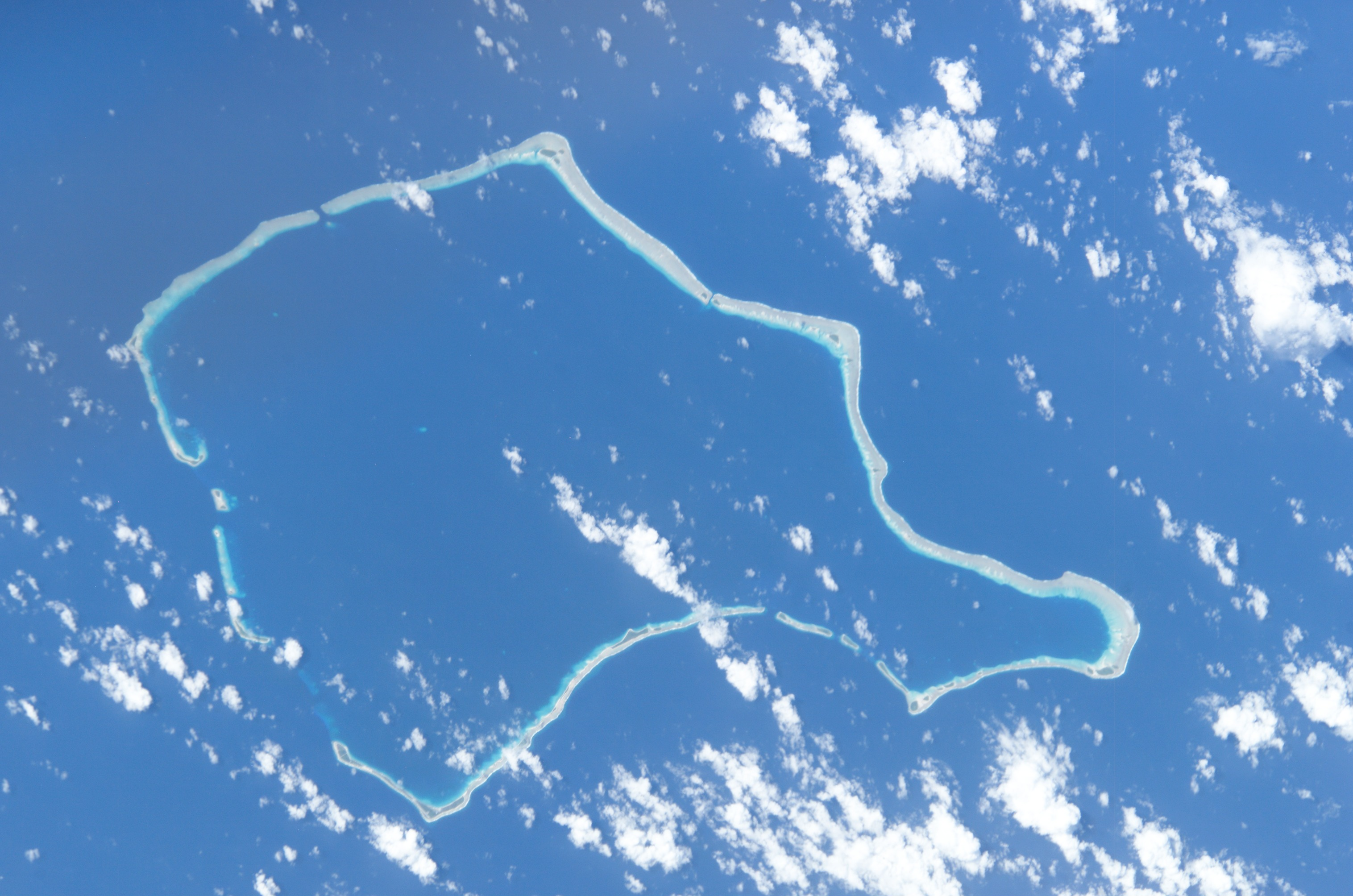
NASA astronaut photography image of Rongelap Atoll.

Rongelap Atoll (/ˈrɒŋɡəlæp/ RONG-gə-lap; Marshallese: Ron̄ļap, [rʷɔŋʷ(ɔ)lˠɑpʲ]) is a formerly inhabited coral atoll of 61 islands (or motus) in the Pacific Ocean, and forms a legislative district of the Ralik Chain of the Marshall Islands. Its total land area is 8 square miles (21 km^{2}). It encloses a lagoon with an area of 1,000 square miles (2,600 km^{2}). It is historically notable for its close proximity to US hydrogen bomb tests in 1954, and was particularly devastated by fallout from the Castle Bravo test. The U.S. initially waited two days to evacuate the Rongelapese people after this testing. In 1957, the U.S. moved these citizens back to Rongelap as a part of Project 4.1, and after 28 years of continued health issues due to radiation exposure, the population was forced to leave the atoll. Initially, the population asked the US (several times) to move them from Rongelap following the test due to high radiation levels, but with no success; so they asked global environmental group Greenpeace to help. The Rainbow Warrior made three trips moving the islanders, their possessions and over 100 tons of building materials to the island of Mejato in the Kwajalein Atoll, 180 kilometers away.

== History ==
The Marshall Islands, of which Rongelap Atoll is a part, were first settled by Micronesians.

The first sighting recorded by Europeans was by Spanish navigator Álvaro de Saavedra on 1 January 1528. Together with Utirik, Ailinginae and Toke atolls, they were charted as Islas de los Reyes (Islands of the Three Wise Kings in Spanish) due to the proximity of Epiphany. Fourteen years later it was visited by the Spanish expedition of Ruy López de Villalobos.

Rongelap Atoll was claimed by the German Empire along with the rest of the Marshall Islands in 1885. After World War I, the island came under the South Seas Mandate of the Empire of Japan. The base became part of the vast US Naval Base Marshall Islands. Following the end of World War II, Rongelap came under the control of the United States as part of the Trust Territory of the Pacific Islands.

== Nuclear testing impact ==
=== The tests ===
From 1946 until 1958 the United States military conducted multiple atmospheric nuclear weapons tests, including hydrogen bomb tests, primarily at Bikini Atoll, about 120 kilometers (75 mi) from Rongelap Atoll. On March 1, 1954, the testing of the Castle Bravo hydrogen device produced an explosion that was 2½ times more powerful than predicted, and produced unexpected amounts of fallout that resulted in widespread radioactive contamination. The mushroom cloud contaminated more than 7,000 square miles (18,000 km^{2}) of the surrounding Pacific Ocean including some of the then inhabited surrounding islands including Rongerik Atoll, Rongelap Atoll (120 kilometers (75 mi) away) and Utirik Atoll.

Irradiated debris fell up to 2 centimeters (0.8 in) deep over the island. A United States military medical team visited the island with geiger counters the day after the fallout, but left without telling the islanders of the danger they had been exposed to. Virtually all the inhabitants experienced severe radiation sickness, including itchiness, sore skin, vomiting, diarrhea, and fatigue. Their symptoms also included burning eyes and swelling of the neck, arms, and legs. The inhabitants were forced to abandon the islands, leaving all their belongings, three days after the test. They were relocated to Kwajalein for medical treatment. Six days after the Castle Bravo test, the U.S. government set up a secret project to study the medical effects of the weapon on the residents of the Marshall Islands.

The United States was subsequently accused of having used the inhabitants in medical research (without receiving consent) to study the effects of nuclear exposure. Until that time, the United States Atomic Energy Commission had given little thought to the potential impact of widespread fallout contamination and health and ecological impacts beyond the formally designated boundary of the test site.

=== Failed return to the atoll ===
In 1957, three years later, the United States government declared the area 'clean and safe' and allowed the islanders to return, though they were told to stick to canned foods and avoid the northern islets of the atoll. US scientists noted that "The habitation of these people on the island will afford most valuable ecological radiation data on human beings." Contrary to the US government's assurances, evidence of continued contamination mounted, as a number of residents developed thyroid-tumors, and many children died of leukemia. Rates of miscarriages and stillbirths in Rongelap were twice the rate of unexposed women in the Marshall Islands. The magistrate of Rongelap, John Anjain, whose own son died of leukemia, appealed for international help, without significant response.

=== Relocated by Greenpeace ===
In 1984, Marshall Islands senator, Jeton Anjain approached the environmental group Greenpeace to seek their help in relocating the people of Rongelap and in 1985, 'Operation Exodus' took place. In three trips, the Rainbow Warrior moved approximately 350 people and 100 metric tons (98 long tons; 110 short tons) of building material. to the islets of Mejato and Ebeye on Kwajalein atoll, approximately 180 kilometers (110 mi) away. The operation took 10 days, moving everyone from 80-year-olds to newborns, as well as their homes and belongings. Ebeye is significantly smaller than the islands of Rongelap, and joblessness, suicide, and overcrowding have proven to be problems following the resettlement.

=== Compensation ===
In September 1996, the United States Department of the Interior signed a $45 million resettlement agreement with the islanders, stipulating that the islanders themselves will scrape off a few inches of Rongelap's still contaminated surface. However, this is an operation deemed impossible by some critics. In recent years, James Matayoshi, the mayor of Rongelap, claimed that the cleanup was successful and envisioned a new promising future for the inhabitants and for tourists. Scientific measurements made in August 2014 verified a safe level of radiation on Rongelap.

=== Aftermath ===
In 1991, the People of Rongelap and Jeton Anjain received the Right Livelihood Award "for their steadfast struggle against United States nuclear policy in support of their right to live on an unpolluted Rongelap island."

In 2012, the US government under the Barack Obama administration reasserted its position that it had satisfactorily compensated the Rongelap victims.

In 2019 Chinese investor Cary Lan leased a large part of the atoll for a proposed special economic zone, in what was seen as part of ongoing efforts by China to expand its reach into the Pacific and conduct chequebook diplomacy against Taiwan. After his arrest in Thailand in 2020, the project was abandoned. He was deported to the United States in 2022 for allegedly bribing elected officials in this case.

== Education ==
Marshall Islands Public School System operates Mejatto Elementary School, which serves descendants of the community in Mejatto that resided in Rongelap Atoll.
