= Ailinginae Atoll =

Atoll in the Marshall Islands

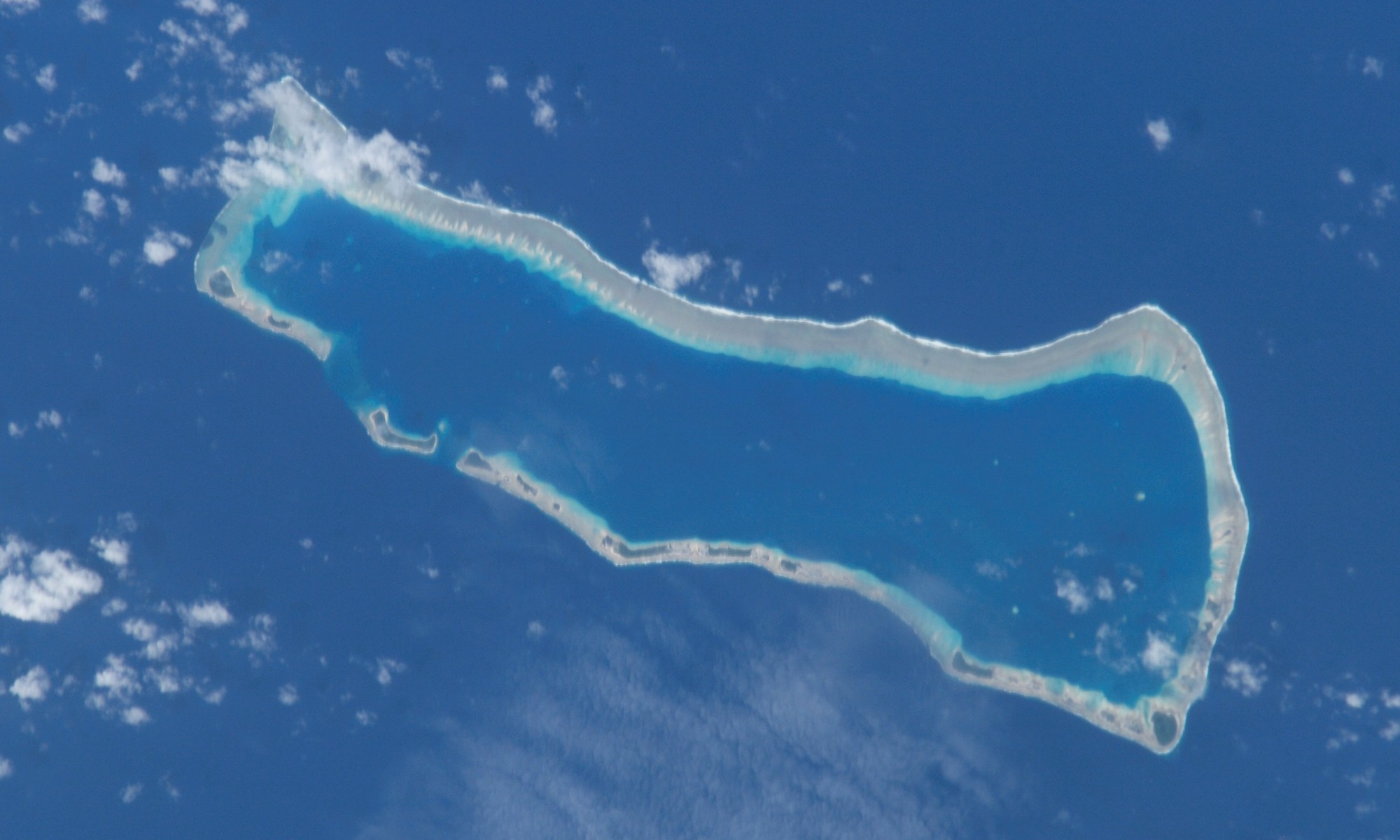
- NASA photo of Ailinginae Atoll

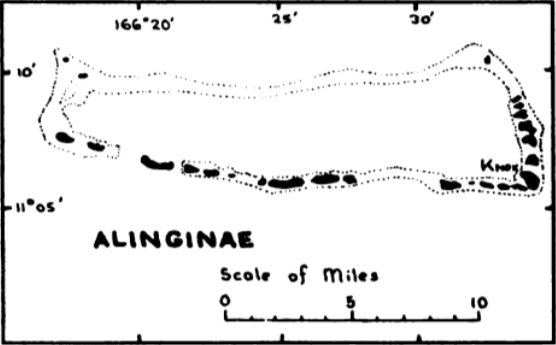
- Map of Ailingnae Atoll

- Location in the Marshall Islands

Geography
- Location: North Pacific
- Coordinates: 11°10′N 166°20′E
- Archipelago: Ralik
- Total islands: 25
- Area: 2.8 km^{2} (1.1 sq mi)
- Highest elevation: 3 m (10 ft)

Administration
- Marshall Islands

Demographics
- Population: 0
- Ethnic groups: Marshallese (former)

Ailinginae Atoll (Marshallese: Aelōn̄in Ae, [ɑelʲɤŋinʲɑːɛ]) is an uninhabited (due to Castle Bravo nuclear testing) coral atoll of 25 islands in the Pacific Ocean, on the northern end of the Ralik Chain of the Marshall Islands. Its total land area is only 2.8 square kilometers (1.1 sq mi), but it encloses a lagoon of 105.96 square kilometers (40.91 sq mi). It is located approximately 13 kilometers (8.1 mi) west of Rongelap Atoll. The landscape is low-lying with only the top 3 meters (9.8 ft) above sea level. The two entrances into the lagoon are 'Mogiri Pass' and 'Eniibukku Pass'. These are 1.45 and 0.48 kilometers (0.9 and 0.3 mi) wide respectively.

The average temperature of these islands is about 27 °C (81 °F) during daytime and slightly warmer during night-time due to cold weather associated with rain showers during daytime. The rainy season is from September through November. The island is covered with 29 species of plants scrub, grasses and some stands of Pisonia grandis trees.

== History ==
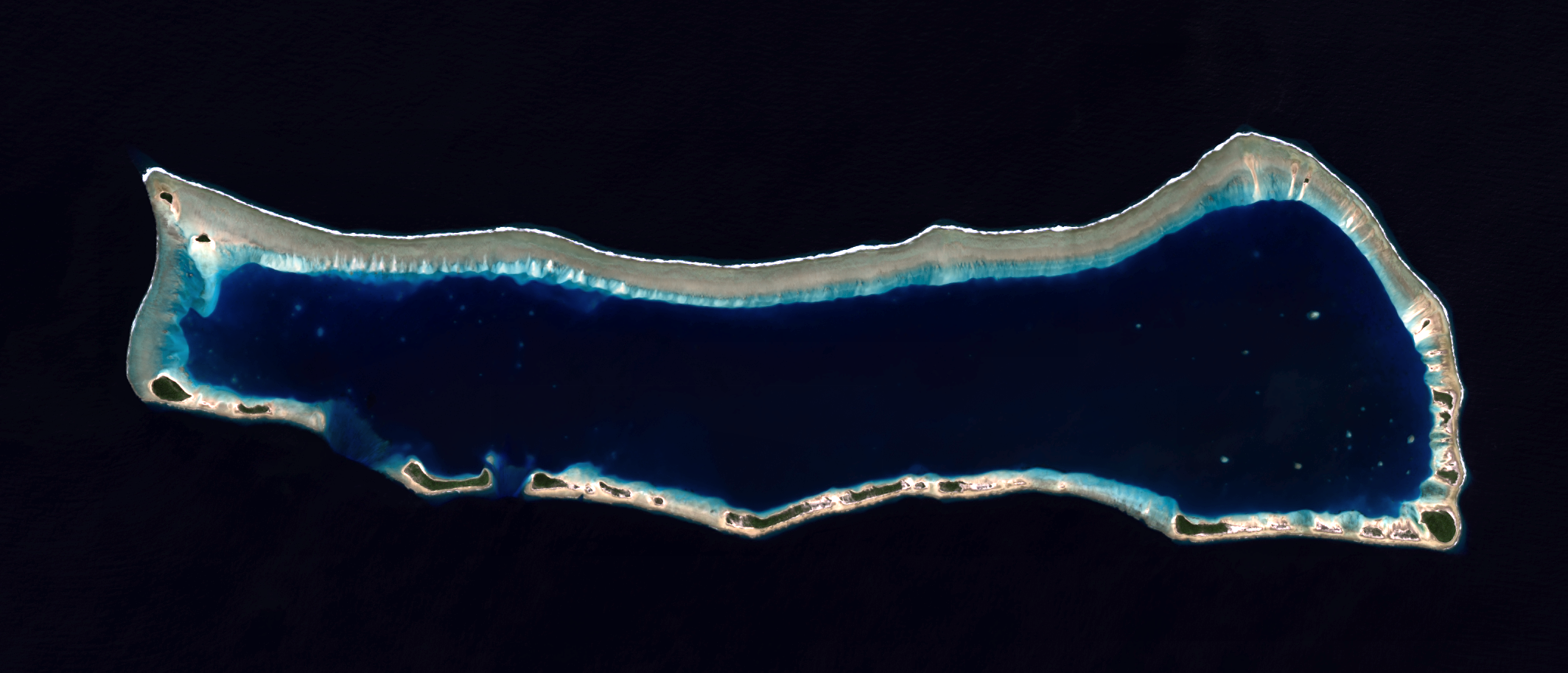
NASA Landsat 8 image of Ailinginae Atoll

The Spanish navigator Álvaro de Saavedra made the first sighting recorded by Europeans on 1 January 1528. Together with Utirik Atoll and Rongelap Atoll, they were charted as Islas de los Reyes (Islands of the Three Wise Kings in Spanish) due to the proximity of Epiphany

Ailinginae Atoll was claimed by the German Empire along with the rest of the Marshall Islands in 1885. After World War I, the island came under the South Seas Mandate of the Empire of Japan. Following the end of World War II, it came under the control of the United States as part of the Trust Territory of the Pacific Islands until the independence of the Marshall Islands in 1986. Ailinginae Atoll has been uninhabited since 1954 when the few islanders were evacuated due to nuclear fallout fears from the Castle Bravo test at Bikini Atoll to the northwest.

== See also ==
- Also contaminated by Castle Bravo test: Rongelap Atoll, Utirik Atoll, Rongerik Atoll
- Desert island
- List of islands
