= USS Caliente =

Oiler of the United States Navy

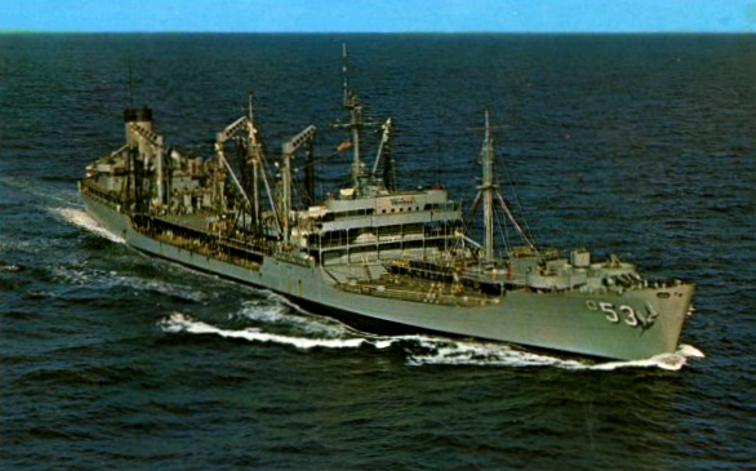

History

United States
- Name: USS Caliente
- Namesake: Caliente River in New Mexico; Caliente, California; Caliente, Nevada
- Builder: Bethlehem Shipbuilding Corporation, Bethlehem Sparrows Point Shipyard, Sparrows Point, Maryland
- Laid down: 2 January 1943
- Launched: 25 August 1943
- Sponsored by: Helen Essary
- Commissioned: 12 October 1943
- Decommissioned: 15 December 1973
- Stricken: 15 December 1973
- Fate: Sold for scrap, 5 April 1974

General characteristics
- Class & type: Cimarron-class oiler
- Displacement: 7,236 long tons (7,352 t) light; 25,440 long tons (25,848 t) full load
- Length: 553 ft (169 m)
- Beam: 75 ft (23 m)
- Draft: 32 ft (9.8 m)
- Propulsion: Geared turbines, twin screws, 30,400 shp (22,669 kW)
- Speed: 18 knots (21 mph; 33 km/h)
- Capacity: 146,000 barrels
- Complement: 314
- Armament: 1 × 5 in (130 mm)/38 cal. gun; 4 × 3 in (76 mm)/50 cal. guns (4×1); 4 × twin 40 mm AA guns; 4 × twin 20 mm guns AA guns

Service record
- Operations: World War II, Korean War, Vietnam War
- Awards: 10 battle stars (World War II); 4 battle stars (Korea); 8 campaign stars (Vietnam); Meritorious Unit Commendation

USS Caliente (AO-53) was a Cimarron-class fleet oiler built during World War II for the U.S. Navy. During her career in the Pacific Ocean, Caliente participated in World War II, the Korean War, and the Vietnam War. She was highly decorated for fulfilling her dangerous mission of carrying fuel into battle areas. She received ten battle stars for World War II, four for the Korean War and eight campaign stars for the Vietnam War.

== Construction and commissioning ==
The auxiliary oiler was built by Bethlehem Sparrows Point Shipyard as a type T3-S2-A1 fast petroleum carrier (Maritime Commission contract MC hull 719), and was laid down at Sparrows Point, Maryland, on 2 January 1943. She was launched on 25 August 1943, sponsored by Helen Essary, widow of noted American journalist, J. Frederick Essary. The ship was commissioned on 22 October 1943.

== World War II Pacific Theatre operations ==
After steaming to Norfolk, Virginia, on 25 October, Caliente spent the next month practiced refueling operations in the Chesapeake Bay, including one high-speed simulation with Bunch, and conducted standard training exercises. Her crew also worked up her fuel delivery systems and struggled to repair chronic engine trouble. On 11 December, after degaussing, calibrating her Radar-Directional-Finder and compass, and two changes of command, she got underway for Port Arthur, Texas. Escorted by Endicott, in case any German U-boats were lurking about, she moored at the Texas Oil Co. dock on 16 December. After loading fuel oil she got underway for Balboa, Panama Canal Zone, and transited the Panama Canal on 22 December.

She arrived at Pearl Harbor, the logistical nexus of the entire Pacific effort, on 7 January 1944. Attached to Service Squadron Eight, U.S. Pacific Fleet, the oiler conducted fueling exercises for the next two weeks. After a fueling stop at Lahaina Roads Caliente sailed on 25 January to support the Marshall Islands invasion. Attached to Task Group (TG) 50.17, a three oiler replenishment group, she berthed at Majuro atoll on 2 February (D+3). Fueling operations commenced immediately and she shifted berth to Funafuti Atoll, Ellice Islands. When her tanks emptied she took on fuel oil from SS Fort Sumter and returned to Majuro on 12 February. She remained in and around the atoll for two months, taking fuel from civilian tankers, and refueling Navy vessels. These included the aircraft carriers Yorktown, Saratoga, and Enterprise, their numerous escorts, as well as the battleships Mississippi and South Dakota.

Although most of the scheduled fueling at sea had been canceled, Majuro lagoon being large enough to accommodate the entire tanker fleet, the oiler got underway with TG 50.17 on 12 April for her first at sea replenishment mission. She fueled Bunker Hill and New Jersey on 19 April, part of Admiral Albert E. Montgomery's Task Force 58.2 that struck the Wakde and Hollandia airfields on 21 April, and distributed fuel to the many short-legged escorts in both task forces. After filling her tanks from SS Guadalupe at Seeadler Harbor, Admiralty Islands, the oiler supplied the returning carrier forces with avgas and fuel oil. Underway 28 April she steamed east and, despite multiple submarine contacts, arrived safely at Pearl Harbor on 9 May.

== Supporting ships of the Invasion of Saipan ==
After a brief period of repair she loaded up on cargo oil and avgas and departed for station at Majuro atoll. Arriving 3 June Caliente fueled dozens of ships in the lagoon and, in mid-June, supported the task forces during the Saipan landings. On 7 July, despite numerous submarine contacts, the oiler refueled the U.S. 5th Fleet carriers on their return from the Philippine Sea battles. For the remainder of the month, as part of Operation Forager, she carried logistical supplies, mostly diesel and black oil, from Enewetak to ships off Saipan. Caliente even made a run to Pearl Harbor, arriving 12 August, to assist the civilian tankers in the unending task of transporting oil and avgas to the fuel-guzzling carriers off the Marianas.

In September she fueled ships of the Palau invasion, including the carriers on 23 September, and sailed for Manus to receive fuel oil from SS Perote. Underway 10 October she carried fuel to the seventeen carriers of Admiral Halsey's U.S. 3rd Fleet, on their return from raids on Luzon and Formosa, before returning to Ulithi. Following a mission to shuttle fuel to the fast carriers, operating west of the Marianas on 11 November, she returned to that atoll for reassignment.

== Sinking of Mississinewa ==
On 20 November, after loading 97,975 barrels of black oil from SS Mission San Carlos, as well as a full load of avgas, diesel, and cargo oil, Caliente lay at anchor awaiting a destination. Ulithi, a regulating station of the Logistics Division, Pacific Fleet, had been deemed safe from enemy interference yet close enough to serve as a transshipment point for the forward operating areas. But on 20 November the Japanese struck at this logistical lifeline. At 0547 hours the oiler Mississinewa, a sister ship of Caliente, was hit by a kaiten, a Japanese manned torpedo, and burst into flames. Mississinewa was occupying a berth originally meant for Caliente. Caliente and the other oilers, to protect their volatile cargo, steamed out of the harbor. While at least three of the attackers were sunk, Mississinewa, having just loaded 107,000 barrels of fuel in her hold, exploded and sank, killing 60 of her crew.

== Supporting Philippine invasion forces ==
For the remainder of the year Caliente refueled task forces operating off the Philippines, easily weathering a tropical cyclone on 18 December, and even entered Leyte Gulf to fuel New Jersey and Lexington on 17 January 1945. In February she departed Ulithi atoll, remembered only for "movies on the cargo deck and beer parties at Mogmog island", for the long voyage to San Francisco, California. Her first overhaul, after 13 months of continuous operations, began on 7 March when she entered the graving dock in San Pedro harbor. On 25 April, with repairs complete, she got underway for Pearl Harbor. She took on passengers and fuel, departed for Ulithi 9 May, and arrived at the familiar flat atoll to await assignment on 20 May.

Underway 30 May, despite the breakdown of her port engine circulating pump, she refueled light carriers and cruisers after weathering her second typhoon on 4 June. After receiving fuel oil from SS Pamamset she fueled escorts, and the occasional carrier, off the Bonin Islands and Honshū throughout July and August. Arriving Ulithi on 18 August the oiler, despite the Japanese surrender, did not slow her tempo and quickly refilled her tanks with black oil.

== End-of-war activity ==
In the following month she supplied ships assigned to occupation duty, anchoring in Tokyo Bay on 10 September, before returning to Ulithi for more fuel. Returning to Tokyo Bay on 17 October she received more oil, from SS Mechanicsville and SS Point Pleasant, before sailing to China to support ships on occupation duty. The oiler refueled ships in Qingdao, and off the Shandong coast, before returning to Tokyo on 27 November. After receiving another cargo of oil she steamed to Kure Ko, Honshū, Japan on 2 December. She spent the remainder of the year in port, fueling small craft, conducting steam line repairs, and supplying oil to former Imperial Japanese navy vessels engaged in the repatriation of Japanese nationals from mainland Asia.

These post-war operations were to become normal for Caliente, especially as the huge American presence in Japan, China, and Korea, promised to continue into the indefinite future. During 1946 the oiler distributed fuel throughout the western Pacific, mainly Yokosuka, Singapore, and Manila, making two trips of her own to Bahrain to load fuel from the newly developed Persian Gulf oil fields. It was not until 14 November that the oiler finally steamed into San Pedro, California, harbor and home.

== Cold War activity ==
As the Navy reacted to the burgeoning "Cold War", in Asia as well as Europe, Caliente conducted two long cruises into 1948. The first, starting on 4 March 1947, took the oiler from west coast operations to the southern Pacific, Japan, the British base at Columbo, and Bahrain. After a shuttle run to Singapore and Yokosuka in July the oiler sailed for Norfolk via the Suez Canal in September. On 30 November she returned to Singapore, via the Suez Canal and Ras Tamira, before reaching San Pedro on 30 December. In 1948 she was assigned to shuttle runs between Western Pacific bases and Chinese ports. These Far East tours, centered around Japanese ports, continued into 1950 with Caliente attached to Service Squadron Three.

== Korean War operations ==
Upon the outbreak of war in Korea in June 1950, Caliente returned to wartime operations, supplying fuel oil and avgas to the Formosa Patrol Force and U.S. 7th Fleet in the Far East. After her third logistical support tour ended on 9 January 1952 she was homeported at Long Beach, California. The worn down oiler, in dire need of maintenance after delivering over 750,000 barrels of fuel to United Nations ships during the war, began her third yard overhaul later that month.

The following year Caliente continued deployments to the Far East, supplying mid-Pacific ports and the Japanese ports of Yokosuka, Sasebo, Yokohama, and Kobe. Caliente also served as station oiler at Kaohsiung, Formosa, in 1953, during which she helped upgrade harbor charts.

== Supporting Vietnam Evacuation and Atomic Testing ==
In August 1954, the oiler joined Operation Passage to Freedom, the sea lift of anti-communist Vietnamese out of communist-held territory following the Geneva peace agreements in 1954. Caliente operated out of Touraine Bay, refueling some of the 74 amphibious and 39 transports involved in the evacuation of some 300,000 refugees and military personnel from Haiphong to Saigon. The oiler also participated in Operation Redwing, a series of five atmospheric nuclear tests off Eniwetok and Bikini Atolls in the Marshall Islands between 3–27 July 1956. She then returned to more mundane cargo runs in the western Pacific, including the ironic task of providing replenishment for Japanese Self-Defense Force warships.

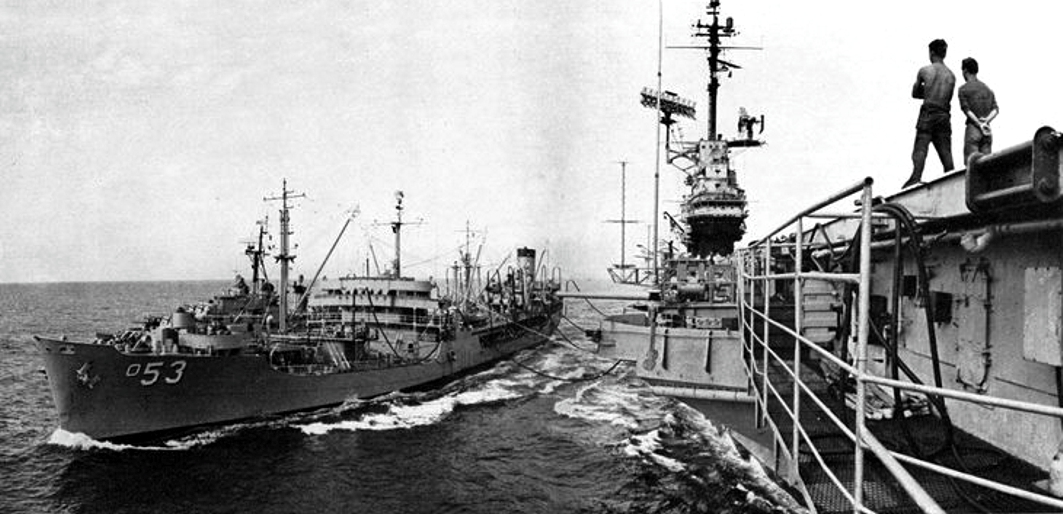
Caliente refueling USS Hancock, 1962

The new decade began with Caliente conducting WestPac Ops with U.S. 7th Fleet units, including underway replenishment of Kearsarge and Ticonderoga, in the western Pacific. After another repair period in Todd Shipyard, San Pedro, California, and tender availability at Long Beach, the oiler sailed for another WestPac tour in 1961. After avoiding a typhoon off Hong Kong, on 14 July, she finished replenishment operations out of Yokosuka and Sasebo, Japan, before sailing for Alaska. For ten days she steamed above the Arctic Circle, encountering intermittent fog and numerous whales, to refuel the United States Coast and Geodetic Survey ship USC&GS Surveyor, before departing for the warmer waters of California. On 15 August the oiler began her seventh yard overhaul at Long Beach.

== Vietnam War operations ==
After winning the Battle Efficiency "E", and the green "C" for Communications Excellence, Caliente entered Willamette Iron and Steel Works shipyard at Portland, Oregon, on 6 January 1964. The oiler received new communications equipment, modernized tension rigs, and new cargo pumps. On 27 July, after refresher training off San Diego, she departed for the Pearl Harbor. Following the Gulf of Tonkin Incident in early August 1964 USS Ranger was ordered to the South China Sea. On 16 August Caliente refueled Task Group 77.4, including the carrier, as she steamed towards Vietnamese waters. The oiler, however, was plagued by erratic generator failures and spent the following three months under restricted availability at Subic Bay, Philippines before returning to Long Beach.

The following year, after readiness training with U.S. 1st Fleet off California, Caliente arrived at Subic Bay on 24 June 1965. She made nine patrol cruises before the end of the year, carrying bulk and packaged fuels, bottled gases, fleet freight, mail, and personnel to the warships on station off Vietnam. Before her return the following March the oiler had serviced 431 ships alongside, transferred 57.3 million gallons of fuel, and delivered 77,420 pounds of mail. After three months of maintenance and upkeep at Long Beach the oiler departed for yet another logistical support tour in July 1966. Caliente, besides servicing ships, also managed to conduct port visits to Hong Kong, Taiwan, and Sasebo. The crew also donated $1,360.00 to provide a high school education for 17 Filipino children. She did not return to Long Beach until 27 March 1967.

After refresher training, equipment inspection, and routine shipyard overhaul, Caliente prepared for another WestPac tour on 8 January 1968. In addition to her cargo of fuel and lubricants the oiler also took a load of ammunition for the fire support ships. After a stormy crossing to Pearl she replenished the Oriskany and Yorktown carrier groups before arriving at Subic Bay on 2 February. Following voyage repairs, and loading supplies, the oiler departed for a standard ten-day run to the gun line and back. After a three-day run to the Gulf of Thailand the oiler spent five days replenishing ships at An Thoi, refueling Operation Market Time vessels, supplying ammunition to gunfire support ships, receiving retrograde ammunition, and servicing any other ships desiring UNREPs . On the final day Caliente consolidated fuel with another oiler off Yankee Station before steaming to Subic Bay. On most runs the oiler spent the two-day return trip with her decks piled high with empty ammunition casings.

== Operation LONGEX 1968 ==
The oiler conducted eight more line runs, interspersed with port visits to Hong Kong and Singapore, before departing for Auckland, New Zealand, on 12 July. Arriving two weeks later, after passing through the Solomon Islands, Caliente prepared for exercise "LONGEX" '68. This convoy exercise, involving British, Australian, and New Zealand ships, lasted from 29 July to 1 August. The following day, much to her crews' embarrassment, the oiler ran aground while entering the harbor at Auckland. A rising tide, however, lifted her off the channel bank, and she escaped with no damage.

After returning to Long Beach 24 August the oiler underwent her standard upkeep period and then commenced a series of training exercises off the coast. In October, during a month of restricted availability, she received the mounting and wiring for the new Pathfinder navigational radar system. Caliente returned to Sasebo, Japan, on 16 February 1969, and began two weeks of voyage repairs. Line runs to Vietnam continued until 10 July when the oiler replenished task groups in the Sea of Japan, where she earned the Armed Forces Expeditionary Medal. After participating in "LONGEX" '69 she returned to Long Beach on 15 September to service ships of First Fleet.

== Shadowing the Soviets ==
Following her standard period of upkeep Caliente departed 3 April 1970 for her sixth Vietnam deployment. In May the oiler was diverted to the Philippine Sea to shadow a Soviet fleet exercise. She gathered data on two Soviet oilers, Polyarnik and Yegorlyk, and observed the less efficient Soviet bow-to-stern underway replenishment method. After two weeks she of surveillance the oiler departed the area, arriving Sasebo, Japan on 7 May. Three weeks of servicing the Taiwan patrol followed before Caliente arrived at Subic Bay, 30 May, to begin line runs to Vietnam. These "line swings" were similar to previous tours; coastal areas were visited, including port replenishment operations at An Thoi and Vung Tau, and followed by a fuel consolidation on Yankee Station. Foul weather, and poor visual landmarks, made radar navigation essential during these operations.

== Operation HUKASWEX 4–70 ==
Caliente conducted seven line swings, interspersed with fuel loadouts at Kaohsiung, Taiwan, and a typhoon on 12–14 September, before departing the South China Sea on 3 October. After a brief stop at Yokosuka the oiler, followed by a poor weather front, steamed into Pearl on 21 October. Five days later, before returning to Long Beach, she replenished Ticonderoga and seven destroyer/minesweeper escorts participating in ASW exercise HUKASWEX 4–70. During this cruise she had serviced 113 ships and delivered 27,739,522 gallons of fuel. After leave and upkeep the oiler reported to Todd Shipyard for a major overhaul.

On 16 April, her first day out of the yard, Caliente suffered a reduction gear failure and immediately returned to Todd Shipyard. With repairs complete on 10 May she loaded fuel and returned to Long Beach. Local exercises and refresher training began in June but were cut short when a boiler became contaminated with fuel oil. Then, after partially cleaning out the boilers, she put into Todd Shipyard on 22 July to repair excessive stern tube leakage. An ill-timed shipyard strike then stranded Caliente in drydock until 19 August. The next day she was towed to the Long Beach Naval Shipyard and repairs commenced on the boilers the drive shaft bearings. Finally, on 1 October, she began refresher training and departed on a WestPac tour 22 October.

During her time spent in Todd Shipyard during the summer of 1971, she was featured prominently in the climax of the film Escape from the Planet of the Apes. In the film, the two ape leads, played by Roddy McDowall and Kim Hunter, hide out on board this ship and are subsequently hunted down the film's main antagonist, played by Eric Braeden. For the film she was made to look more like a derelict.

On 8 November Caliente refueled DesRon 15, running low on fuel in the empty mid-Pacific, before arriving at Yokosuka on 12 November. After a short UNREP in the Sea of Japan the oiler arrived in Subic Bay, on 2 December. She delivered fuel to Yankee Station on 6 December, refueled amphibious vessels around Subic Bay on 10 December, and departed for her first line swing on 13 December.

== Bay of Bengal operations ==
Three days later Caliente was diverted to the Bay of Bengal in response to the India-Pakistan war that had begun on 3 December. The successful invasion of East Pakistan by India, with the accompanying fighting and unrest, led to U.S. naval forces being sent to assist, if need be, in the evacuation of American citizens. The oiler replenished Task Force 74 between 16 and 23 December, delivering badly needed fuel, before returning to Subic Bay on 30 December for another loadout.

In January the oiler conducted two line swings, with only a two-day turnaround at Subic Bay, before steaming into Singapore on 25 January 1972. She loaded fuel, a successful trial experiment to determine the feasibility of using the port on a regular basis, and made a line swing along the Vietnamese coast. After a port visit to Hong Kong Caliente returned to Subic and the dull but essential logistical support missions.

After twelve line swings the oiler put into Sasebo, Japan, on 30 July for upkeep. Six days later she departed for Long Beach and the Bethlehem Steel Shipyard for a major fuel conversion. The oilers engines were converted to diesel fuel by 29 November and she began preparations for yet another WestPac deployment.

After loadout at the San Pedro, California, fuel pier the twenty-nine-year-old oiler got underway for Subic Bay on 22 January 1973. Following an uneventful, but exercise intensive, crossing the oiler began her first line swing on 17 February. After a second line swing she visited Kaohsiung, Taiwan. Then she provided logistical support during "Operation Golden Dragon", a training exercise with the South Korean Navy, conducted her third line swing as she worked her way south, and put into the ANZUK Naval Basin, Singapore, for upkeep on 16 April.

Three more line swings lasted until 22 June when Caliente conducted a training exercise, "Sharkhunt II", with ships of the Taiwanese Navy. After loadout at Kaohsiung, and line swing number seven, the ship returned to Subic Bay for two weeks of repair and upkeep. On 22 July she departed for Yokosuka and, after another exercise with Taiwanese ships and training Japanese Naval Defense Force midshipmen, Caliente put into port on 2 August. The oiler, assigned as an escort to five MSOs, departed on 7 August for the long trip, via Guam, back to Pearl Harbor. The oiler, having completed her last tour, sailed into Long Beach on 1 September 1973. There she received a Meritorious Unit Commendation for her logistics support efforts for Seventh Fleet.

== Decommissioning and Disposition ==
On 13 November, the Board of Inspection and Survey found Caliente unfit for further service. She was stricken from the Naval Vessel Register and decommissioned at Long Beach on 15 December. The hulk was then sold to National Metal & Steel Corp. on 5 April 1974.

== Awards ==
Caliente received ten battle stars for World War II.

- Marshall Island Operations Spring 1944
- Asiatic-Pacific Raids Spring 1944
- Hollandia Operation Spring 1944
- Marianas Operation Summer 1944
- Tinian Capture and Operation Summer 1944
- Western Caroline Islands Operation Summer-Fall 1944
- Leyte Operations Fall 1944
- Luzon Operation Winter 1944–45
- Okinawa Gunto Operation Summer 1945
- 3rd Fleet Operations Against Japan Summer 1945

She received four battle stars for the Korean War:

- Communist China Spring Offensive
- UN Summer-Fall Offensive
- Korean Defense Summer-Fall 1952
- Korea, Summer-Fall 1953

She received eight campaign stars for Vietnam War service:

- Vietnam Defense
- Tet Counteroffensive
- Vietnamese Counteroffensive – Phase IV
- Vietnamese Counteroffensive – Phase V
- Tet/69 Counteroffensive
- Vietnam Summer-Fall 1969
- Sanctuary Counteroffensive
- Vietnamese Ceasefire
