= Essary =

Essary is a surname. Notable people with the surname include:

- Helen Essary (1886–1951), American syndicated columnist
- Jesse Frederick Essary (1881–1942), American journalist

== See also ==
- Essary Springs, Tennessee, a census-designated place
- SS J. Fred Essary, US Navy cargo ship
