= Nuclear testing at Bikini Atoll =

US nuclear testing on Bikini Atoll in the Marshall Islands

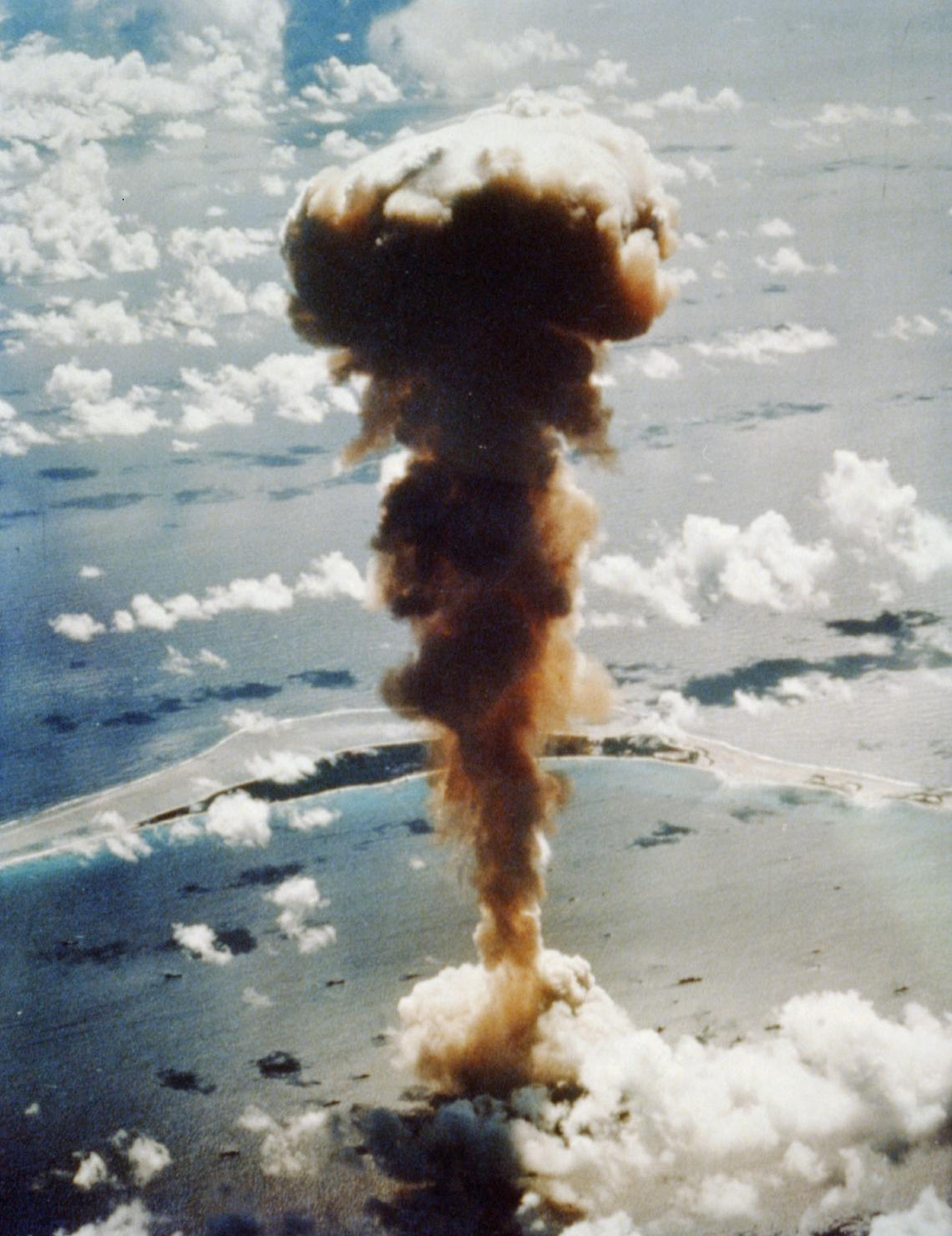
Aerial view of the Able test, a 23 kt (96 TJ) device detonated on July 1, 1946 at an altitude of 520 ft (160 m).

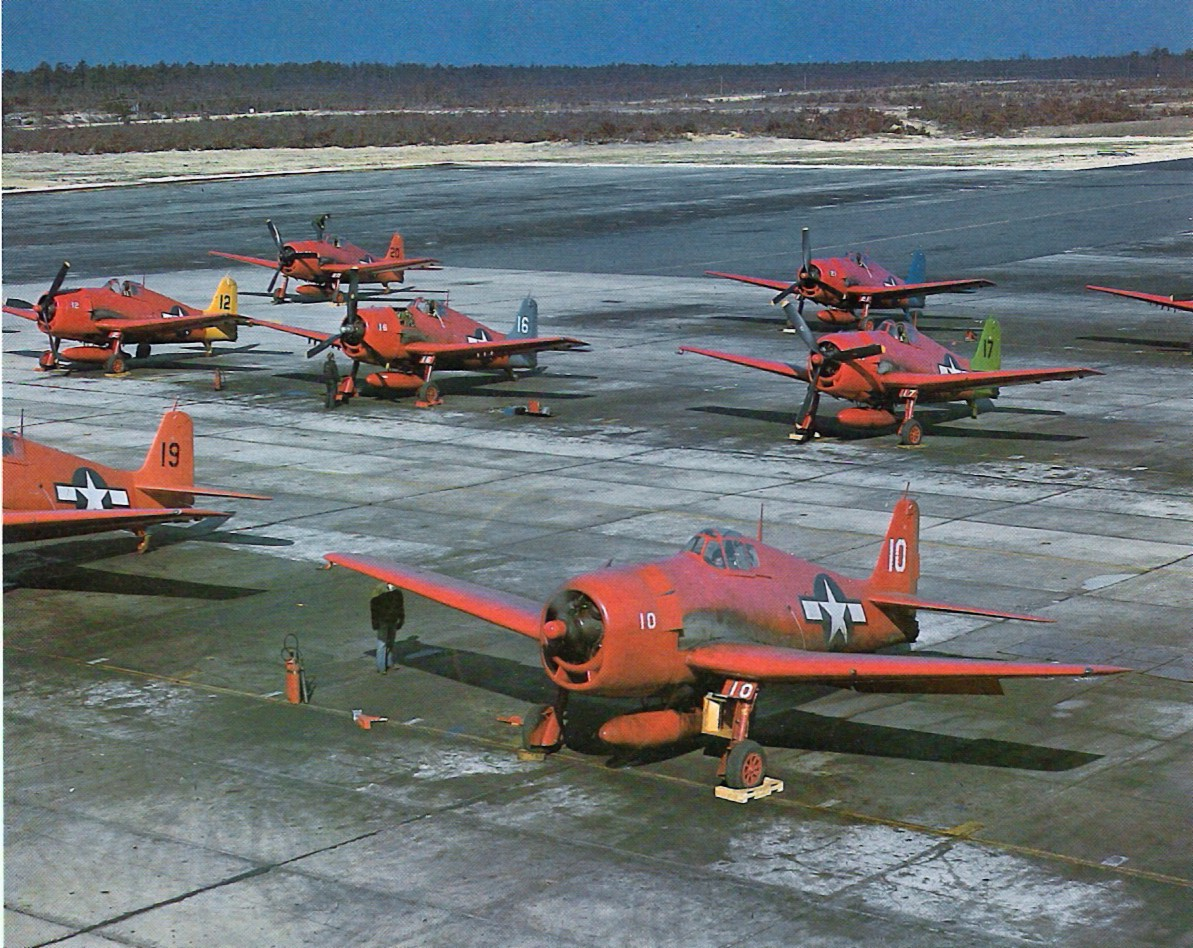
FH6-FK Hellcat unmanned aircraft are prepared for their flight through mushroom cloud.

Nuclear testing at Bikini Atoll consisted of the detonation of 23 (or 24 (Note: The Hardtack Yucca test was conducted using a stratospheric balloon. The ship with this balloon departed from Bikini Atoll. The launch of this balloon was made between Enewetak and Bikini Atolls, slightly closer to Bikini. The surface zero was closer to Enewetak Atoll. Therefore this test can only be conditionally classified as a test performed at Bikini Atoll.)) nuclear weapons by the United States between 1946 and 1958 on Bikini Atoll in the Marshall Islands. Tests occurred at seven test sites on the reef itself, on the sea, in the air, and underwater. The test weapons produced a combined yield of about 77–78.6 Mt of TNT in explosive power. After the inhabitants agreed to a temporary evacuation, to allow nuclear testing on Bikini, which they were told was of great importance to humankind, two nuclear weapons were detonated in 1946. About ten years later, additional tests with thermonuclear weapons in the late 1950s were also conducted. The first thermonuclear explosion was much more powerful than expected, and created a number of issues, but did demonstrate the dangers of such devices.

The United States and its allies were engaged in a Cold War nuclear arms race with the Soviet Union to build more advanced bombs from 1947 until 1991. The first series of tests over Bikini Atoll in July 1946 was codenamed Operation Crossroads. The first bomb, named Able, was dropped from an aircraft and detonated 520 ft (160 m) above the target fleet. The second, Baker, was suspended under a barge. It produced a large Wilson cloud and contaminated all of the target ships. Chemist Glenn T. Seaborg, the longest-serving chairman of the Atomic Energy Commission, called the second test "the world's first nuclear disaster." A third test, Charlie, was cancelled due to concerns over the lingering radiation from Baker's detonation.

The second series of tests in 1954 was codenamed Operation Castle. The first detonation was Castle Bravo, which tested a new design utilizing a dry-fuel thermonuclear bomb. It was detonated at dawn on March 1, 1954. Scientists miscalculated: the 15 Mt of TNT nuclear explosion far exceeded the expected yield of 4–8 Mt of TNT (6 predicted). This was about 1,000 times more powerful than either of the atomic bombs dropped on Hiroshima and Nagasaki during World War II. The scientists and military authorities were shocked by the size of the explosion, and many of the instruments that they had put in place to evaluate the effectiveness of the weapon were destroyed.

Authorities had promised the Bikini Atoll's residents that they would be able to return home after the nuclear tests. A majority of the island's family heads agreed to leave the island, and most of the residents were moved to the Rongerik Atoll and later to Kili Island. Both locations proved unsuitable to sustaining life, and the United States provides residents with on-going aid. Despite the promises made by authorities, these and further nuclear tests (Redwing in 1956 and Hardtack in 1958) rendered Bikini unfit for habitation, contaminating the soil and water, making subsistence farming and fishing too dangerous. The United States has paid more than $300 million into various trust funds to compensate the islanders and their descendants. A 2016 investigation found radiation levels on Bikini Atoll as high as 639 mrem/yr (6.39 mSv/yr), well above the established safety standard for habitation. However, Stanford University scientists reported "an abundance of marine life apparently thriving in the crater of Bikini Atoll" in 2017.

== Preparation ==
The major preparation was to relocate the residents after discussion with them. At the time it was thought it would be a temporary relocation. As time showed, the nuclear weapons contaminated the area in a way that made them dangerous to live in for an extended period.

=== Residents relocated ===
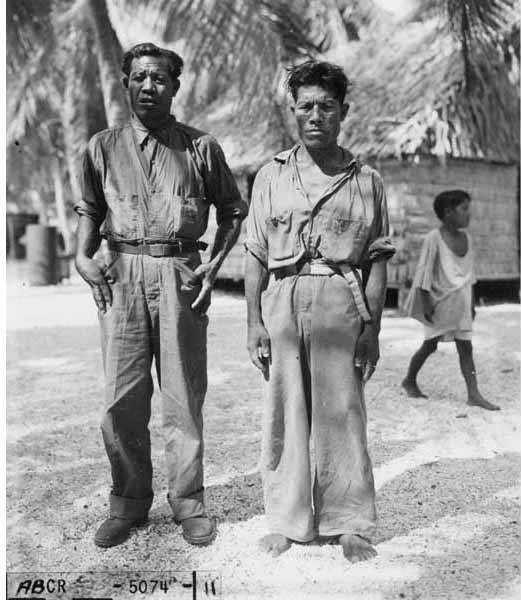
Bikini Chief Judah, island magistrate from Rongerik Atoll, with one of his subchiefs, August 1947

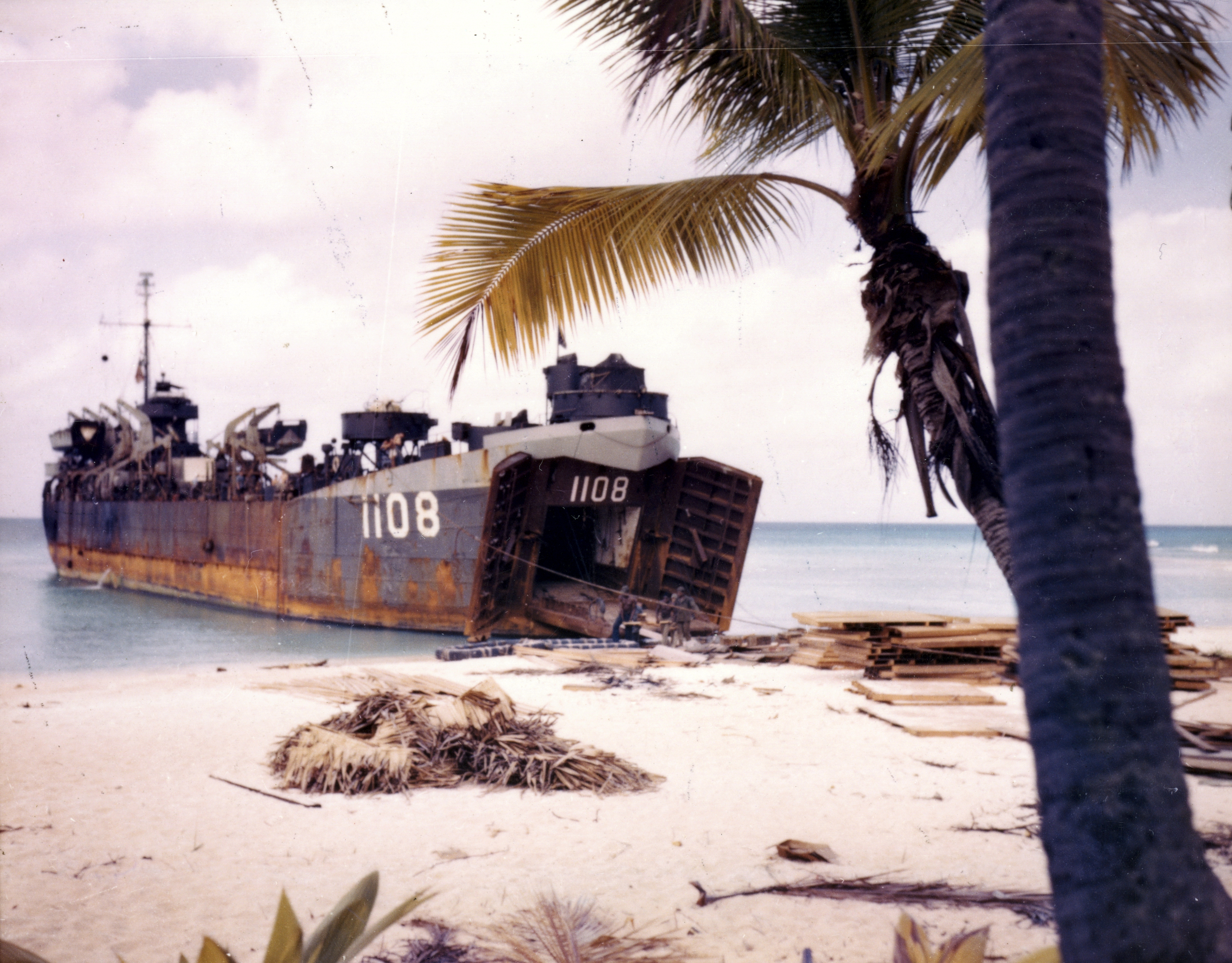
LST arrives in March 1946

In February 1946, the United States government forced the 167 Micronesian inhabitants of the atoll to temporarily relocate so that testing could begin on atomic bombs. King Juda agreed to the request, announcing that "we will go believing that everything is in the hands of God." Nine of the eleven family heads chose Rongerik as their new home. Navy Seabees helped them to disassemble their church and community house and prepare to relocate to their new home. On March 7, 1946, (now known as Bikini Day) the residents gathered their belongings and building supplies. They were transported 125 mi (201 km) eastward on Navy landing craft 1108 and LST 861 to the uninhabited Rongerik Atoll, which was one-sixth the size of Bikini Atoll. No one lived on Rongerik because it had an inadequate water and food supply, and also due to traditional beliefs that the island was haunted by the Demon Girls of Ujae. The Navy left them with a few weeks of food and water which soon proved inadequate.

=== Military services ===
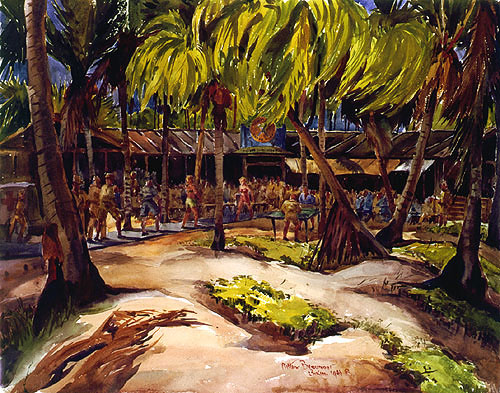
The Cross Spikes Club, painted by Navy artist Arthur Beaumont in 1946.

The United States assembled a support fleet of 242 ships that provided quarters, experimental stations, and workshops for more than 42,000 personnel. The islands were primarily used as recreation and instrumentation sites. Seabees built bunkers, floating dry docks, 75 ft (23 m) steel towers for cameras and recording instruments, and other facilities on the island to support the servicemen. These included the "Up and Atom Officer's Club" and the "Cross Spikes Club", a bar and hang-out created by servicemen on Bikini Island between June and September 1946. The "club" was little more than a small open-air building which served alcohol to servicemen and provided outdoor entertainment, including a ping pong table. The "Cross Spikes Club" was the only entertainment that the enlisted servicemen had access to during their June to September stay at Bikini.

=== Ship graveyard ===
The Navy designated Bikini Atoll lagoon as a ship graveyard, then brought in 95 ships, including carriers, battleships, cruisers, destroyers, submarines, attack transports, and landing ships. The proxy fleet would have comprised the sixth largest naval fleet in the world if the ships had been active. All carried varying amounts of fuel, and some carried live ordnance.

== Weapons tests ==
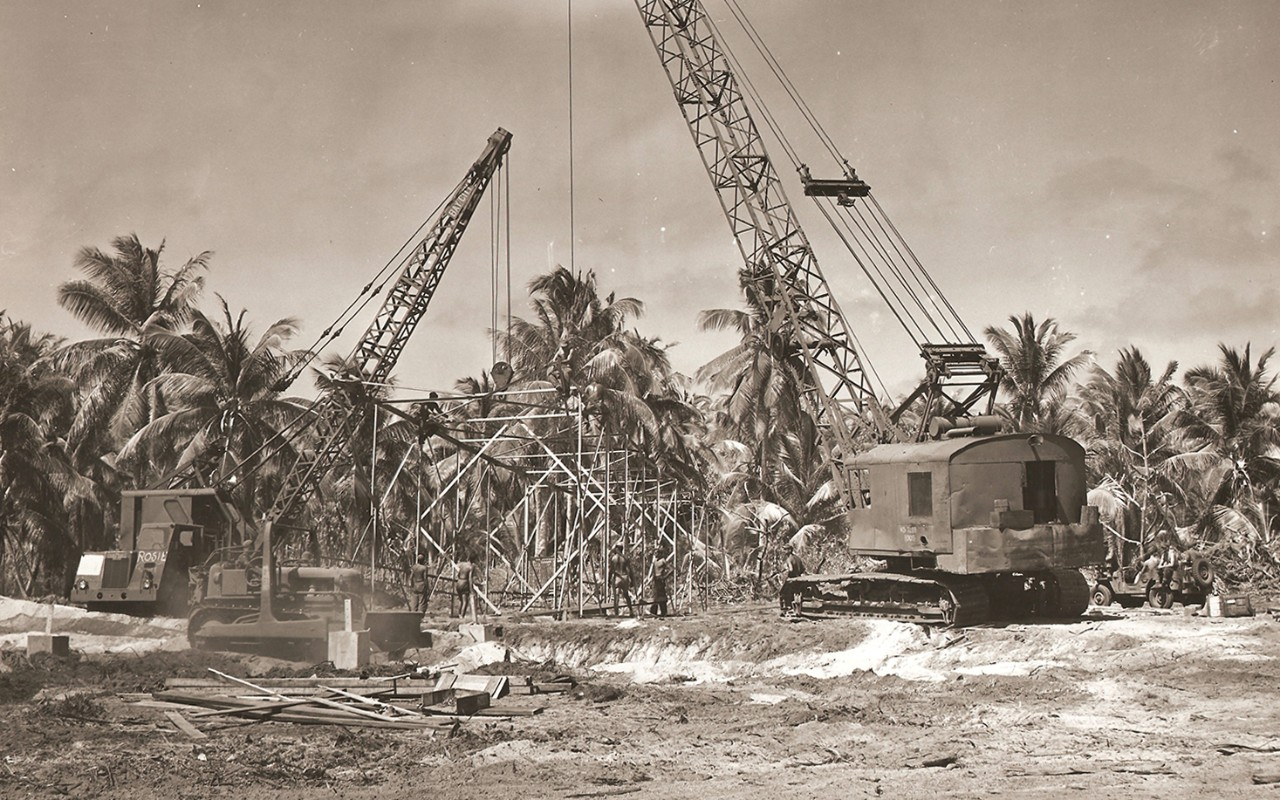
Members of the Seabees' 53rd Naval Construction Battalion build camera towers prior to atomic bomb testing on Bikini Atoll, July 1946.

=== Operation Crossroads ===
The Wilson cloud from test Baker, situated just offshore from Bikini Island at top of the picture.

Crossroads consisted of two detonations, each with a yield of 23 kt of TNT (96 TJ). Able was detonated over Bikini on July 1, 1946 and exploded at an altitude of 520 ft (160 m), but was dropped by aircraft about 1,500 to 2,000 ft (460 to 610 m) off target. It sank only five of the ships in the lagoon. Baker was detonated underwater at a depth of 90 ft (27 m) on July 25, sinking eight ships. The second underwater blast created a large condensation cloud and contaminated the ships with more radioactive water than was expected. Many of the surviving ships were too contaminated to be used again for testing and were sunk. The air-borne nuclear detonation raised the surface seawater temperature by 99,000 °F (55,000 °C), created blast waves with speeds of up to 26 ft/s (7.9 m/s), and shock and surface waves up to 98 ft (30 m) high. Blast columns reached the floor of the lagoon, which is approximately 230 ft (70 m) deep.

Charlie was planned for 1947 but was canceled primarily because of the Navy's inability to decontaminate the target ships after the Baker test. Charlie was rescheduled as Operation Wigwam, a deep water shot conducted in 1955 off the California coast.

=== Castle Bravo test ===
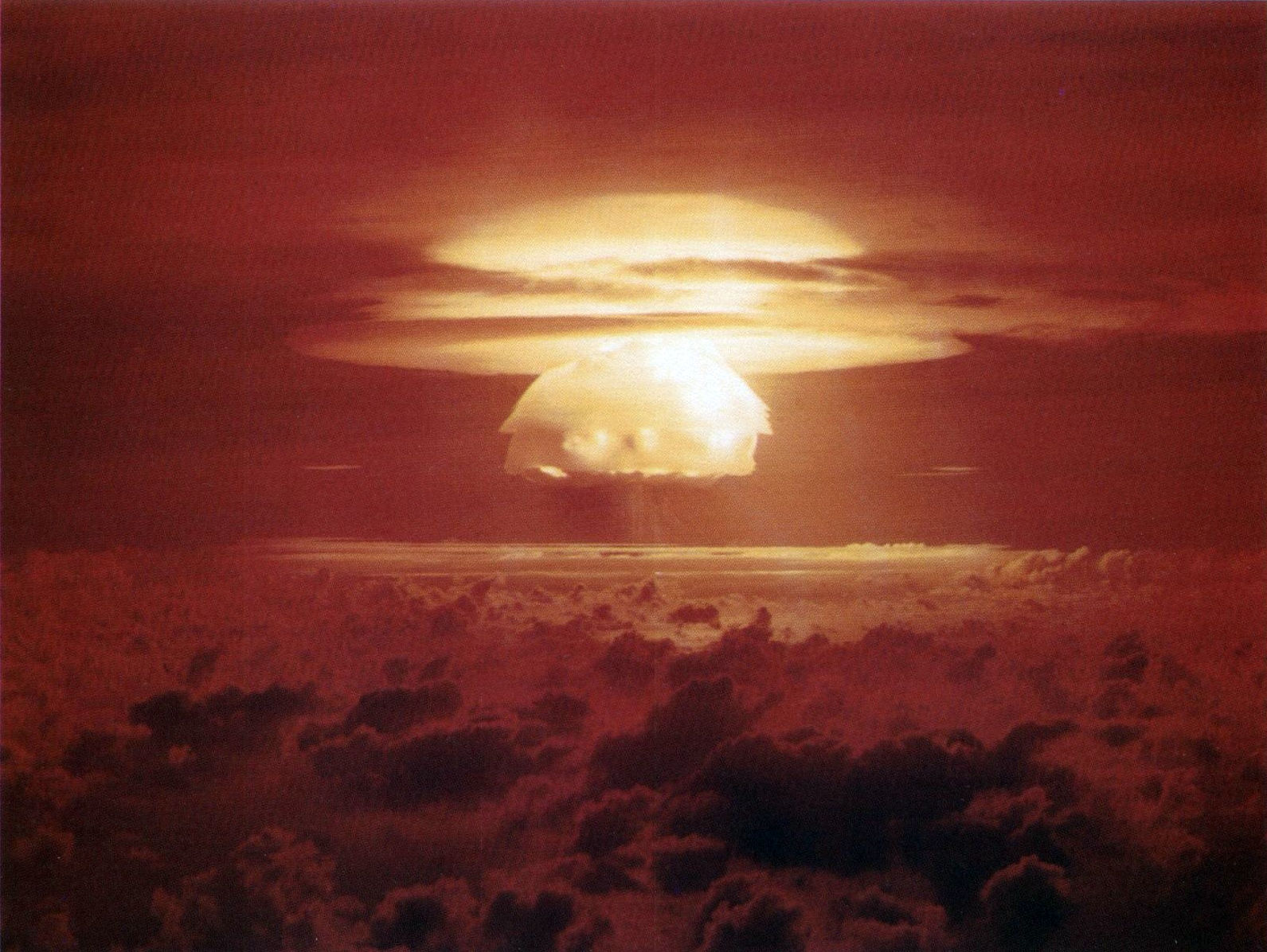
The size of the Castle Bravo test on March 1, 1954 far exceeded expectations, causing widespread radioactive contamination. The fallout spread traces of radioactive material as far as Australia, India, and Japan, and even to the United States and parts of Europe. It was organized as a secret test, but it quickly became an international incident, prompting calls for a ban on the atmospheric testing of thermonuclear devices.

The next series of tests over Bikini Atoll was codenamed Operation Castle. The first test of that series was Castle Bravo, a new design utilizing a dry fuel thermonuclear bomb. It was detonated at dawn on March 1, 1954.

The explosion yielded 15 Mt of TNT, far exceeding the expected yield of 4 to 8 Mt of TNT (6 predicted), and was about 1,000 times more powerful than each of the atomic bombs dropped on Hiroshima and Nagasaki during World War II. The device was the most powerful nuclear weapon ever detonated by the United States. Bravo had just under one third the energy of the Soviet Tsar Bomba, the largest nuclear device ever tested. However, while the Soviets intended to create such a large weapon, Castle Bravo's yield was much higher than anticipated. The scientists and military authorities were shocked by the size of the explosion, and it destroyed many of the instruments put in place to evaluate the effectiveness of the test.

The test (Codename Shrimp) was considered "the worst" nuclear test, with one designer saying "We had no idea what we were doing". The results of this test led to the limited test ban treaty of 1963.

=== Castle Bravo contamination ===
The unexpectedly large yield led to the most significant radiological contamination caused by the United States. A few minutes after the detonation, blast debris began to fall on Eneu/Enyu Island on Bikini Atoll where the crew who fired the device were located. Their Geiger counters detected the unexpected fallout, and they were forced to take shelter indoors for a number of hours before it was safe for an airlift rescue operation.

The fallout continued to spread across the inhabited islands of the Rongelap, Rongerik, and Utrik Atolls. The inhabitants of Rongelap and Rongerik Atolls were evacuated by servicemen two days after the detonation, but the residents of the more distant Utrik Atoll were not evacuated for three days. Many of them soon began to show symptoms of acute radiation syndrome. They returned to the islands three years later but were forced to relocate again when the islands were found to be unsafe.

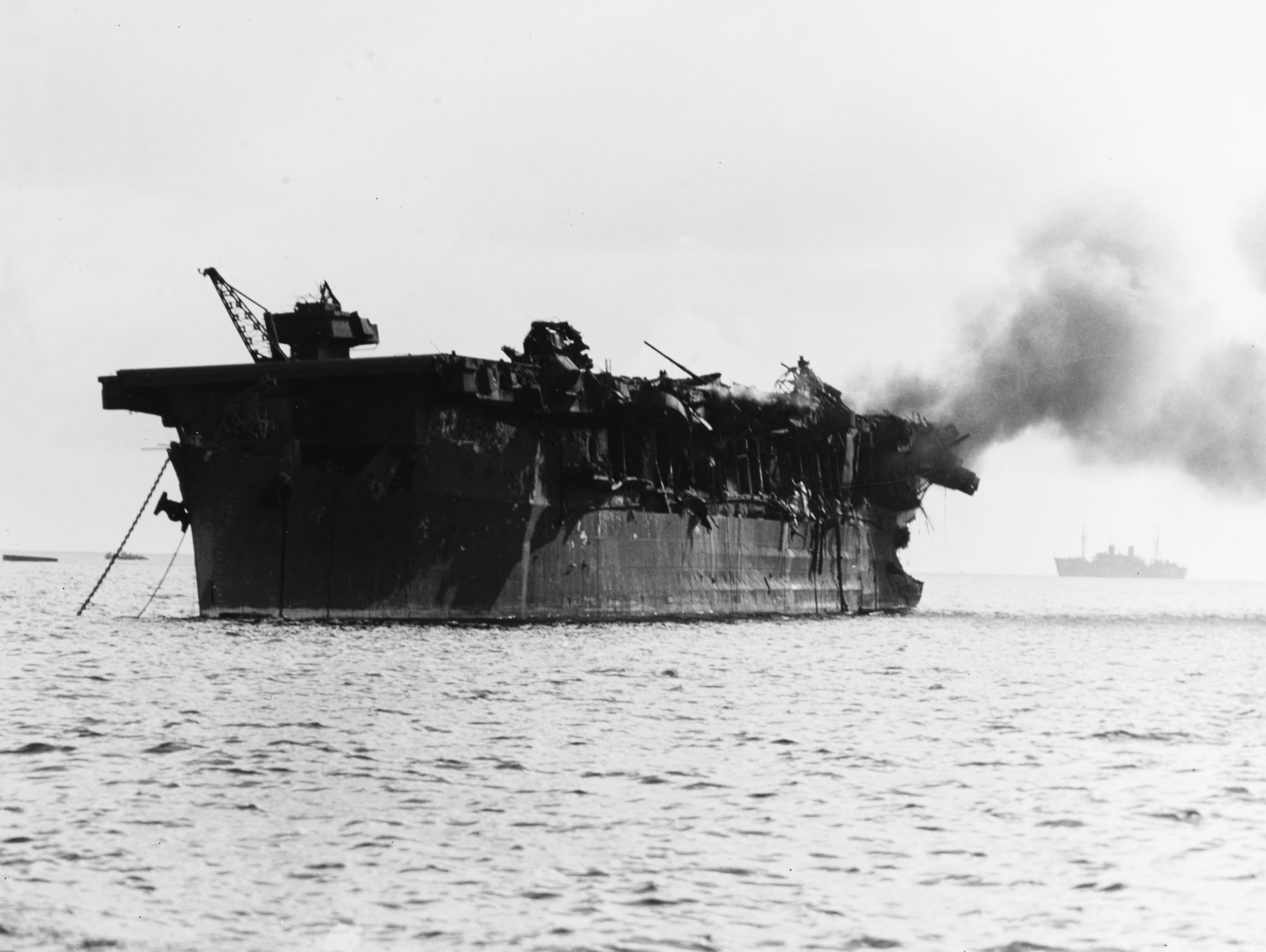
The light aircraft carrier USS Independence (CVL-22) afire aft, soon after the "Able Day" atomic bomb air burst test at Bikini on July 1, 1946

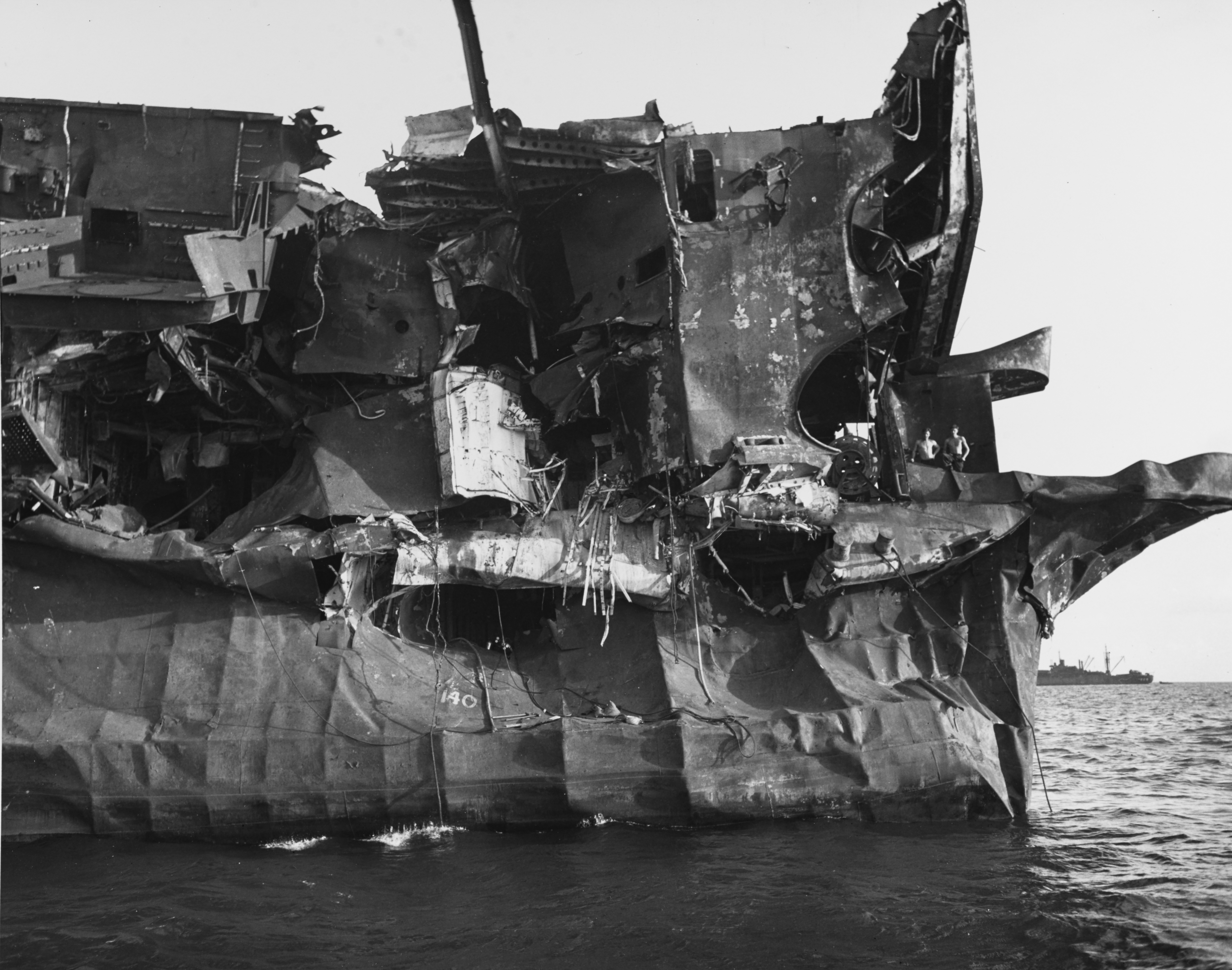
View of the USS Independence's port quarter showing severe blast damage caused by the "Able Day" atomic bomb air burst over Bikini Atoll on July 1, 1946

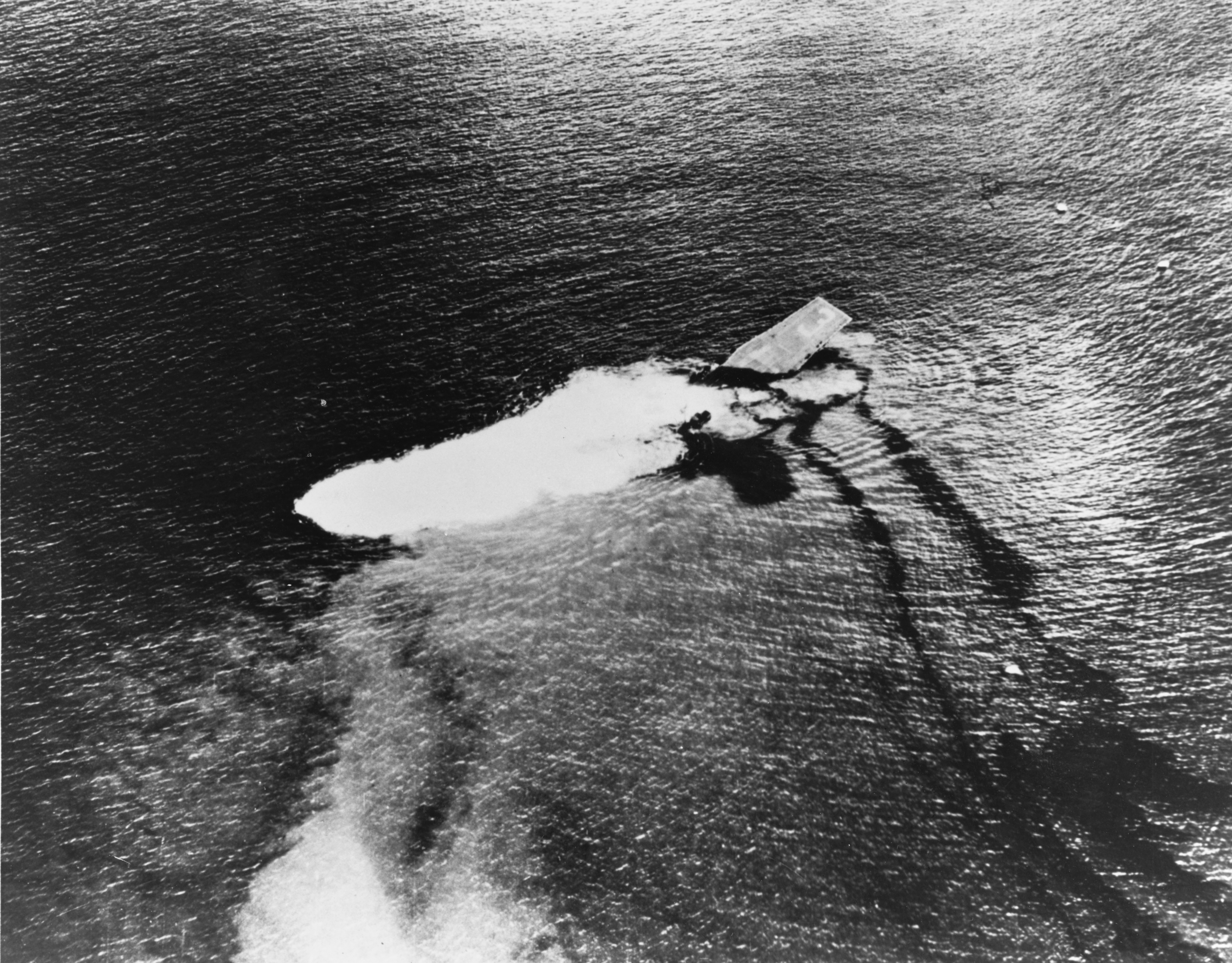
USS Saratoga (CV-3) sinking after Operation Crossroads

The fallout gradually dispersed around the globe, depositing traces of radioactive material in Australia, India, Japan, and parts of the United States of America and Europe. It had been organized as a secret test, but Castle Bravo quickly became an international incident prompting calls for a ban on atmospheric testing of thermonuclear weapons.

=== Local populations affected ===
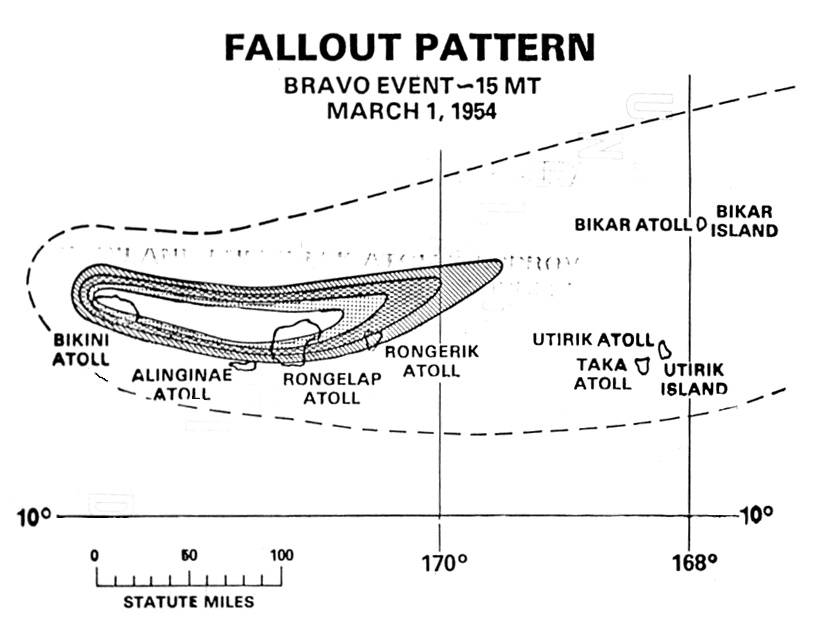
Path of the nuclear fallout plume after the Castle Bravo test: the large plume lead to evacuations of additional atolls

The Rongelap Atoll was coated with up to 0.8 in (2.0 cm) of snow-like irradiated calcium debris and ash over the entire island. Virtually all the inhabitants experienced severe radiation sickness, including itchiness, sore skin, vomiting, diarrhea, and fatigue. Their symptoms also included burning eyes and swelling of the neck, arms, and legs. They were forced to abandon the islands three days after the tests, leaving behind all their belongings. The U.S. government relocated them to Kwajalein for medical treatment.

Six days after the Castle Bravo test, the government set up a secret project to study the medical effects of the weapon on the residents of the Marshall Islands. The United States was subsequently accused of using the inhabitants as medical research subjects without obtaining their consent to study the effects of nuclear exposure. Until that time, the Atomic Energy Commission had given little thought to the potential impact of widespread fallout contamination and health and ecological impacts beyond the formally designated boundary of the test site.

=== Japanese fishermen contaminated ===
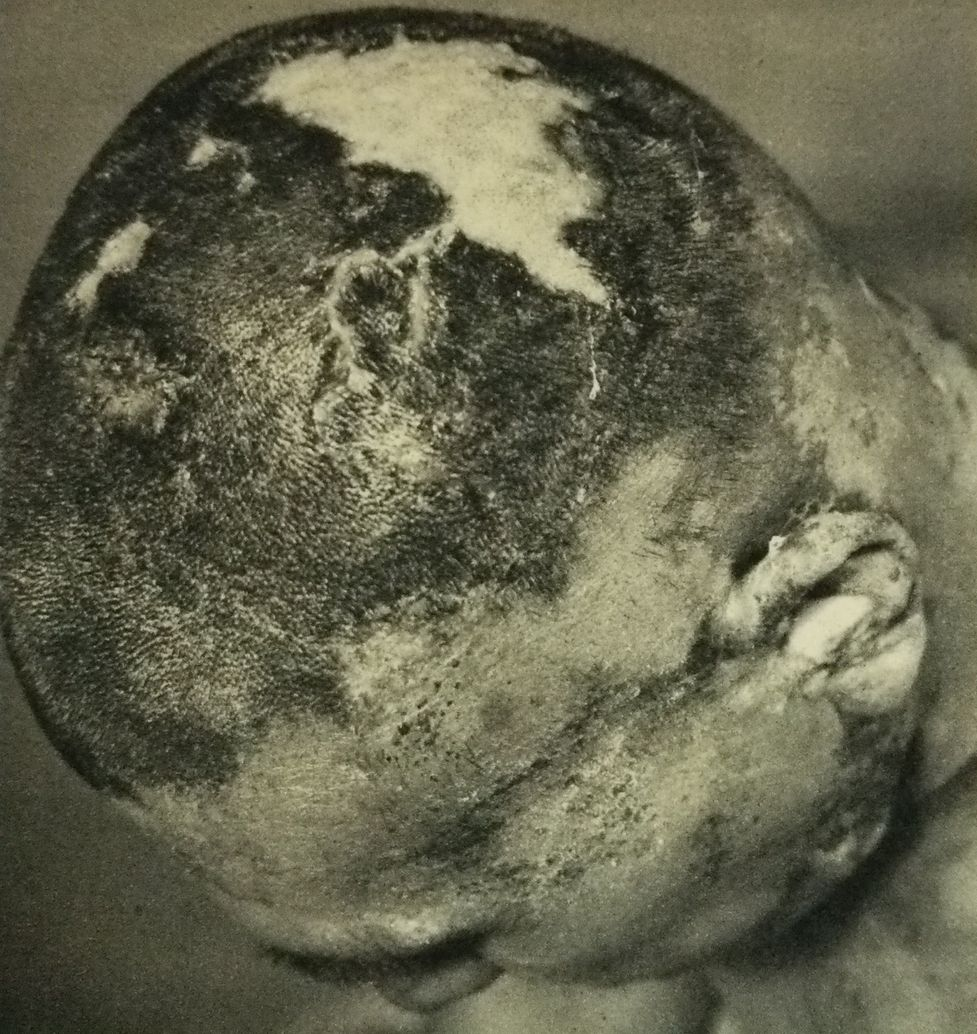
The head of one of the crew members of Daigo Fukuryū Maru showing radiation burns caused by fallout that collected in his hair; dated April 7, 1954, 38 days after the nuclear test

Ninety minutes after the detonation, 23 crew members of the Japanese fishing boat the Daigo Fukuryū Maru ("Lucky Dragon No. 5") were contaminated by the snow-like irradiated debris and ash. They had no idea what the explosion was and no understanding of the debris that rained down like snow, but they all soon became ill with the effects of acute radiation sickness. One fisherman died about six months later while under medical supervision; his cause of death was ruled a pre-existing liver cirrhosis compounded by a hepatitis C infection. The majority of medical experts believe that the crew members were infected with hepatitis C through blood transfusions during part of their acute radiation syndrome treatment.

Edward Teller was one of the driving minds behind the development of the hydrogen bomb and an architect of the Marshall Island tests. After the mass media painted the fisherman's death as an anti-nuclear call to arms, Teller notoriously commented, "It's unreasonable to make such a big deal over the death of a fisherman."

=== Later tests ===
The 17-shot Redwing series followed—11 tests at Enewetak Atoll and six at Bikini. The island residents had been promised that they would be able to return home to Bikini, but the government thwarted that indefinitely by deciding to resume nuclear testing at Bikini in 1954. During 1954, 1956, and 1958, 21 more nuclear bombs were detonated at Bikini, yielding a total of 75 Mt of TNT (310 PJ), equivalent to more than three thousand Baker bombs. The 3.8 Mt of TNT Redwing Cherokee test was the only air burst. Air bursts distribute fallout in a large area, but surface bursts produce intense local fallout. These tests were followed by the 33-shot Hardtack tests, which began in late April 1958. The last of ten tests were detonated on Bikini Atoll on July 22, 1958.

=== Shipwrecks ===
Shipwrecks in the lagoon include:

- USS Saratoga (CV-3) —aircraft carrier
- USS Arkansas (BB-33) —battleship
- USS Gilliam (APA-57) —attack transport
- USS Carlisle (APA-69) —attack transport
- USS Lamson (DD-367) —destroyer
- USS Anderson (DD-411) —destroyer
- USS Apogon (SS-308) —submarine
- USS Pilotfish (SS-386) —submarine
- Japanese battleship Nagato —battleship
- Japanese cruiser Sakawa —light cruiser
- German cruiser Prinz Eugen —heavy cruiser—currently capsized on the surface of Kwajalein Atoll lagoon

== Nuclear test detonations at Bikini Atoll ==
The following above-ground nuclear device tests were conducted on or near Bikini Atoll from 1946 to 1958, comprising 15.1 % of total test yield worldwide. These dates are given in US Eastern time zone. The days of the week are a day earlier than they were at Bikini.

Series	Test Date	Names	Location	Device	Yield Predicted	Yield Actual
Crossroads	30 June 1946	Able	NE Lagoon, Bikini Atoll; 11.59°N 165.50°E	Gilda; Mk III	21 kt of TNT	23 kt of TNT
Crossroads	24 July 1946	Baker	NE Lagoon, Bikini Atoll; 11.59°N 165.50°E	Helen of Bikini; Mk III		23 kt of TNT
Crossroads	1 August 1946	Charlie (cancelled)	NE Lagoon, Bikini Atoll; 11.75°N 165.51°E	Mk III	21 kt of TNT	—
Castle	1 March 1954	Bravo	Artificial island on reef 2,950 feet (900 m) from Namu Island; 11.69722°N 165.27486°E	Shrimp; TX-21	4–8 Mt of TNT	15 Mt of TNT
Castle	25 April 1954	Union	Yurochi aka Irioj (Dog), Bikini Atoll; 11.6664°N 165.3872°E	Alarm Clock; EC-14	3–4 Mt of TNT	6.9 Mt of TNT
Castle	4 May 1954	Yankee I (cancelled)	Yurochi aka Irioj (Dog), Bikini Atoll; 11.6656°N 165.3869°E	Jughead/Runt-II; TX/EC-16/TX/EC-24	—	—
Castle	27 April 1954	Yankee II	Yurochi aka Irioj (Dog), Bikini Atoll; 11.6656°N 165.3869°E	Ramrod; TX-22	8 Mt of TNT	13.5 Mt of TNT
Castle	27 March 1954	Romeo	Yurochi aka Irioj (Dog), Bikini Atoll; 11.69428°N 165.26519°E	Runt; TX/EC-17A	4 Mt of TNT	11 Mt of TNT
Castle	7 April 1954	Koon	Eninmen (Tare), Bikini Atoll; 11.50376°N 165.36852°E	Morgenstern; TX-22	1 Mt of TNT	110 kt of TNT (fizzle)
Redwing	20 May 1956	Cherokee	Namu (Charlie), Bikini Atoll; 11.73973°N 165.33985°E	TX-15-X1	3.8 Mt of TNT	3.8 Mt of TNT
Redwing	27 May 1956	Zuni	Eninmen (Tare), Bikini Atoll; 11.50325°N 165.37049°E	Mk-41	3.5 Mt of TNT	3.5 Mt of TNT
Redwing	6 June 1956	Flathead	Eninmen (Tare), Bikini Atoll; 11.50325°N 165.37049°E	TX-28S		365 kt of TNT
Redwing	11 June 1956	Tewa	Yurochi aka Irioj (Dog), Bikini Atoll; 11.67896°N 165.34042°E	Mk-41; Bassoon		5 Mt of TNT
Redwing	25 June 1956	Dakota	NE Lagoon, Bikini Atoll; 11.6028°N 165.4514°E	TX-28C		1.1 Mt of TNT
Redwing	10 July 1956	Navajo	NE Lagoon, Bikini Atoll; 11.68743°N 165.38263°E	TX21C		4.5 Mt of TNT
Hardtack 1	28 April 1958	Yucca	Bikini and Enewetak Atolls; 12.617°N 167.025°E	W-25		1.7 kt of TNT
Hardtack 1	11 May 1958	Fir	Namu (Charlie), Bikini Atoll; 11.6908°N 165.2733°E			1.4 Mt of TNT
Hardtack 1	21 May 1958	Nutmeg	Eninmen (Tare), Bikini Atoll; 11.50355°N 165.3722°E	early XW-47?		25.1 kt of TNT
Hardtack 1	31 May 1958	Sycamore	Namu (Charlie), Bikini Atoll; 11.69722°N 165.27486°E	TX-41		92 kt of TNT
Hardtack 1	10 June 1958	Maple	Yurochi aka Irioj (Dog), Bikini Atoll; 11.6915°N 165.41582°E			213 kt of TNT
Hardtack 1	14 June 1958	Aspen	Namu (Charlie), Bikini Atoll; 11.6908°N 165.2733°E	XW-47 ?		319 kt of TNT
Hardtack 1	27 June 1958	Redwood	Yurochi aka Irioj (Dog), Bikini Atoll; 11.6915°N 165.41582°E	XW-47 ?		412 kt of TNT
Hardtack 1	29 June 1958	Hickory	Eninmen (Tare), Bikini Atoll; 11.4961°N 162.3708°E	XW-47 ?		14 kt of TNT
Hardtack 1	2 July 1958	Cedar	Namu (Charlie), Bikini Atoll; 11.69722°N 165.27486°E			220 kt of TNT
Hardtack 1	12 July 1958	Poplar	Namu (Charlie), Bikini Atoll; 11.69704°N 165.26708°E	TX-41		9.3 Mt of TNT
Hardtack 1	22 July 1958	Juniper	Eninmen (Tare), Bikini Atoll; 11.50355°N 165.3722°E	XW-47		65 kt of TNT, Final Bikini atmospheric shot
Hardtack 1	August 1958	Piñon (cancelled)	Bikini and Enewetak Atolls; 12°N 162°E	—	—	—
Total						≈76.9 Mt of TNT

== Relocation issues ==
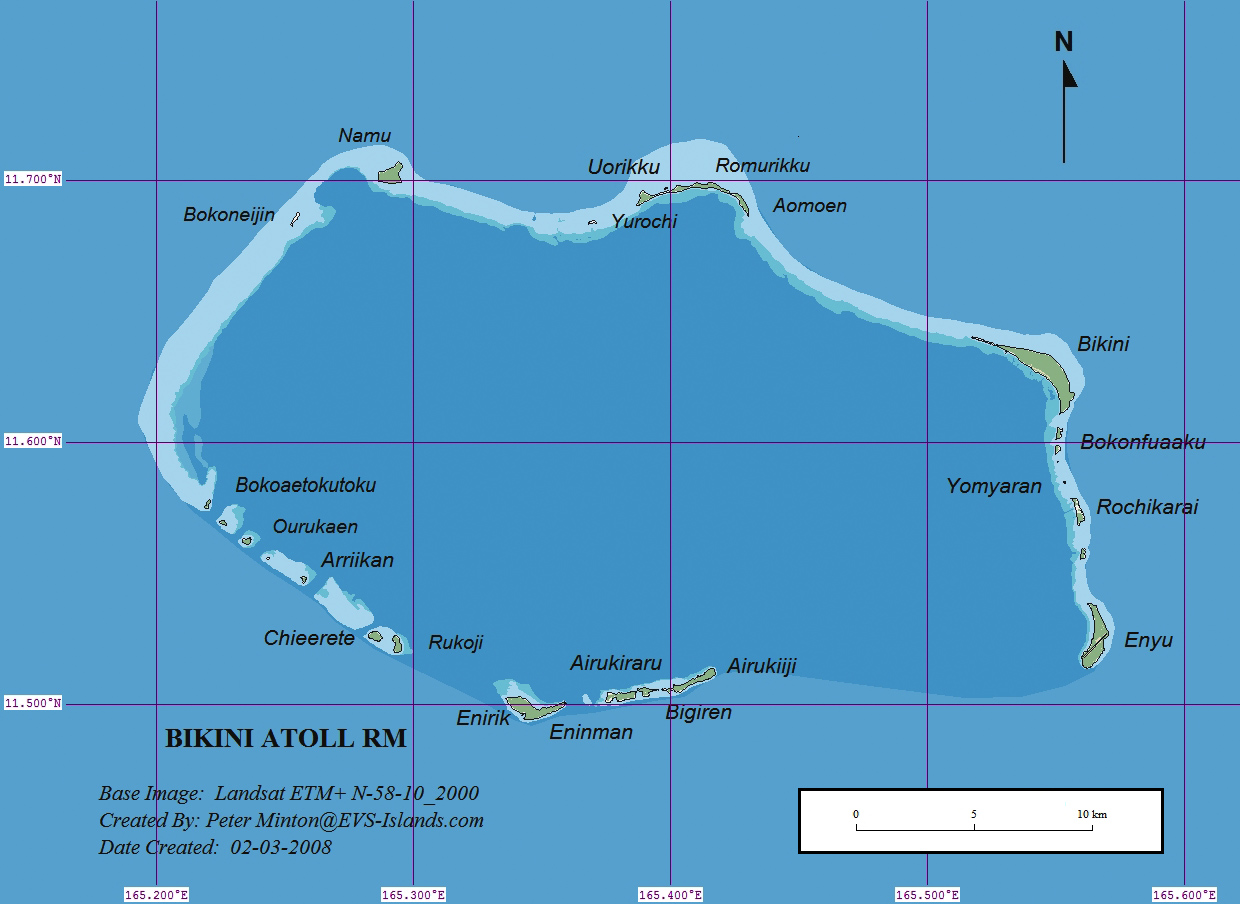
Map of Bikini Atoll as of 2008. The islands of Bokonijien, Aerokojlol and part of Nam were destroyed by the nuclear tests.

=== Strategic Trust Territory ===
In 1947, the United States petitioned the United Nations Security Council to designate the islands of Micronesia a United Nations Strategic Trust Territory. This was the only strategic trust ever granted by the Security Council. The U.S. Navy controlled the trust from a headquarters in Guam until 1951, when the Department of the Interior took over control, administering the territory from a base in Saipan. The directive stipulated that the U.S. would "promote the economic advancement and self-sufficiency of the inhabitants" and "protect the inhabitants against the loss of their lands and resources".

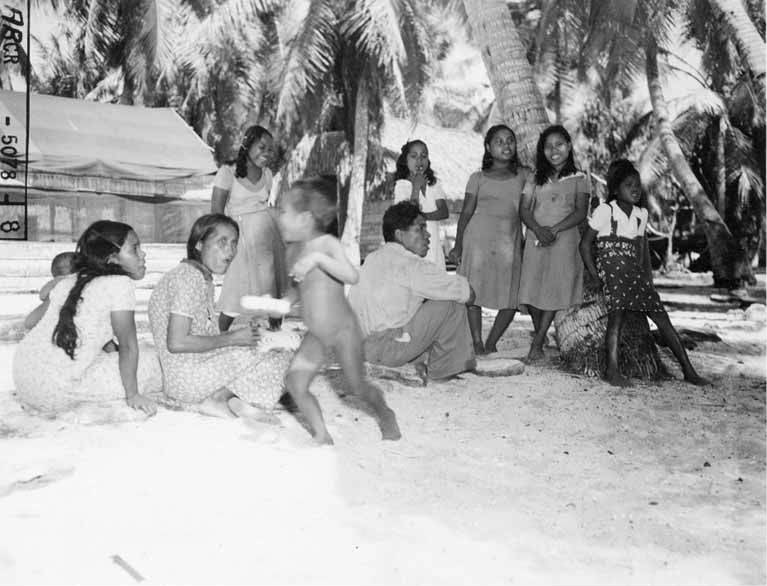
Group of Rongerik Island natives waiting for food to be distributed by Captain Christian Engleman, summer 1947

The residents of Bikini Atoll were left alone on Rongerik Atoll from July 1946 through July 1947. Leonard E. Mason, an anthropologist from the University of Hawaii, visited the islanders on Rongerik Atoll in January 1948 and found that they were starving. A team of U.S. investigators concluded in late 1947 that the islanders must be moved immediately. Press from around the world harshly criticized the U.S. Navy for ignoring them. Columnist Harold Ickes wrote that "the natives are actually and literally starving to death."

The Navy then selected Ujelang Atoll for their temporary home, and some young men from the Bikini Atoll population went ahead to begin constructing living accommodations. But U.S. Trust Authorities decided to use Enewetak Atoll as a second nuclear weapons test site, and they relocated Enewetak's residents to Ujelang Atoll to the homes built for the Bikini Islanders.

In March 1948, 184 malnourished Bikini islanders were temporarily relocated again to Kwajalein Atoll. In June 1948, the Bikini residents chose Kili Island as a long-term home. The 200 acres (81 ha) (0.3125 square miles (0.809 km^{2})) island is one of the smallest in the Marshall Island chain; it was uninhabited and was not ruled by a paramount iroij (king). The Bikini islanders moved there in November 1948.

=== Return to Bikini Island ===
President Lyndon B. Johnson promised the 540 Bikini Atoll families living on Kili and other islands in June 1968 that they would be able to return to their home, based on scientific advice that the radiation levels were sufficiently reduced. But the Atomic Energy Commission learned that the coconut crabs, an essential food source, retained high levels of radioactivity and could not be eaten. The Bikini Council voted to delay a return to the island as a result.

In 1987, a few Bikini elders returned to the island to re-establish old property lines. Construction crews began building a hotel on Bikini and installed generators, desalinators, and power lines. A packed coral and sand runway still exists on Enyu Island. A few extended families began moving back to their home island in the early 1970s despite the risk, eventually totaling about 100 people. But few years later, a team of scientists found that some wells were too radioactive for use and determined that the pandanus and breadfruit were also dangerous for human consumption. Women were experiencing miscarriages, stillbirths, and genetic abnormalities in their children. The U.S.-administered Strategic Trust Territory decided that the islanders had to be evacuated from the atoll a second time.

=== Second evacuation ===
An 11-year-old boy who was born on Bikini in 1971 died from cancer that was linked to radiation exposure that he received on Bikini. The records obtained by the Marshallese Nuclear Claims Tribunal later revealed that Dr. Robert Conard, head of Brookhaven National Laboratory (BNL)'s medical team in the Marshall Islands, understated the risk of returning to the atoll. BNL then contracted Dr. Konrad Kotrady to treat the Marshall Island residents. In 1977, he wrote a 14-page report to BNL that questioned the accuracy of Brookhaven's prior work on the islands. The Bikini Atoll islanders grew to distrust the official reports of the U.S. scientists.

The special International Atomic Energy Agency (IAEA) Bikini Advisory Group determined in 1997 that it was "safe to walk on all of the islands" and that the residual radioactivity was "not hazardous to health at the levels measured". They further stated that "the main radiation risk would be from the food", but they also added that "eating coconuts or breadfruit from Bikini Island occasionally would be no cause for concern". IAEA estimated that living in the atoll and consuming local food would result in an effective dose of about 15 mSv/yr.

The leaders of the Bikini community have insisted since the early 1980s that the top 15 inches (38 cm) of soil should be excavated from the entire island. Scientists reply that removing the soil would rid the island of cesium-137, but it would also severely damage the environment, turning the atoll into a virtual wasteland of windswept sand. The Bikini Council has repeatedly contended that removing the topsoil is the only way to guarantee safe living conditions for future generations.

In 1997, researchers found that the dose received from background radiation on the island was between 2.4 mSv/yr—the same as natural background radiation—and 4.5 mSv/yr, assuming that residents consumed a diet of imported foods. The local food supply is still irradiated and the group did not recommend resettling the island. A 1998 IAEA report found that Bikini should not be permanently resettled because of dangerous levels of radiation in the locally produced food. A permanent rehabitation would likely require the use of potassium fertilizer.

A 2002 survey found that the coral inside the Bravo Crater has partially recovered. Zoe Richards of the ARC Centre of Excellence for Coral Reef Studies and James Cook University observed matrices of branching Porites coral up to 8 m high.

=== Compensation and reparations ===
The Bikini islanders sued the United States for the first time in 1975, and they demanded a radiological study of the northern islands. The United States set up The Hawaiian Trust Fund for the People of Bikini in 1975, totaling $3 million. Residents were removed from the island in 1978, and the government added $3 million to the fund and created The Resettlement Trust Fund for the People of Bikini, containing $20 million in 1982. The government added another $90 million to that fund to pay to clean up, reconstruct homes and facilities, and resettle the islanders on Bikini and Eneu islands.

In 1983, the U.S. and the Marshall islanders signed the Compact of Free Association which gave the Marshall Islands independence. The Compact became effective in 1986 and was subsequently modified by the Amended Compact that became effective in 2004. It also established the Nuclear Claims Tribunal, which was given the task of adjudicating compensation for victims and families affected by the nuclear testing program. Section 177 of the compact provided for reparations to the Bikini islanders and other northern atolls for damages. It included $75 million to be paid over 15 years. On March 5, 2001, the Nuclear Claims Tribunal ruled against the United States for damages done to the islands and its people.

The payments began in 1987 with $2.4 million paid annually to the entire Bikini population, while the remaining $2.6 million is paid into The Bikini Claims Trust Fund. This trust is intended to exist in perpetuity and to provide the islanders a 5 % payment from the trust annually. The United States provided $150 million in compensation for damage caused by the nuclear testing program and their displacement from their home island.

By 2001, 70 of the 167 relocated residents were still alive, and the entire population had grown to 2,800. Most of the islanders and their descendants live on Kili, in Majuro, or in the United States. Only a few living people were born on the Bikini Atoll. Most of the younger descendants have never lived there or even visited. The population is growing at a four percent growth rate, so increasing numbers are taking advantage of terms in the Marshall Islands' Compact of Free Association that allow them to obtain jobs in the United States.

== Recovery of marine ecosystem ==
Stanford University professor Steve Palumbi led a study in 2017 that reported on ocean life that seems highly resilient to the effects of radiation poisoning. The team described substantial diversity in the marine ecosystem, with animals appearing healthy to the naked eye. According to Palumbi, the atoll's "lagoon is full of schools of fish all swirling around the living coral. In a strange way they are protected by the history of this place, the fish populations are better than in some other places because they have been left alone, the sharks are more abundant and the coral are big. It is a remarkable environment, quite odd." Both corals and long-lived animals such as coconut crabs should be vulnerable to radiation-induced cancers, and understanding how they have thrived might lead to discoveries about preserving DNA. Pambuli notes that the Bikini Atoll is "an ironic setting for research that might help people live longer". PBS documented field work undertaken by Palumbi and his graduate student Elora López on Bikini Atoll for the second episode ("Violent") of their series Big Pacific. The episode explored "species, natural phenomena and behaviors of the Pacific Ocean" and the way that the team is using DNA sequencing to study the rate and pattern of any mutations. López suggested possible explanations for the health of the marine life to The Stanford Daily, such as a mechanism for DNA repair that is superior to that possessed by humans, or a method of maintaining a genome in the face of nuclear radiation.

The area has effectively become an unplanned marine-life sanctuary; this has also occurred in Europe in the Chernobyl exclusion zone, where scientists are studying the effects of radiation on animal life. Most fish have relatively short lifespans, and Palumbi suggested that "it is possible the worst-affected fish died off many decades ago… and the fish living in Bikini Atoll today are only subject to low levels of radiation exposure as they frequently swim in and out of the atoll." Nurse sharks have two dorsal fins, but Palumbi's team observed individuals with only a single fin, and they theorized that they might be mutations. Pambuli and his team have focused on the hubcap-sized crabs, as their coconut diet is contaminated with radioactive caesium-137 from ground water, and on the corals, because both have longer life spans that allow the scientists "to delve into what effect the radiation exposure has had on the animals' DNA after building up in their systems for many years."

Bikini Atoll remains uninhabitable for humans due to what United Nations reporter Călin Georgescu described as "near-irreversible environmental contamination". Gamma radiation levels in 2016 averaged 184 mrem yr^{−1} (1.84 mSv/yr), well above the maximum allowed for human habitation, thereby rendering the water, seafood, and plants unsafe for human consumption. Timothy Jorgensen reports on the increased cancer risk among the residents of the nearby islands, especially for leukemia and thyroid cancers.

== Health impacts ==
The Castle Bravo test produced the highest fallout levels in history. The detonation produced an explosion approximately 2.5 times the predicted 6.0 megatons, equal to 15 Mt of TNT. The residents of Rongelap and Utirik atolls were exposed to high levels of radiation, the heaviest of which was in the form of pulverized surface coral from the detonation. They experienced mild radiation sickness including nausea, vomiting, and diarrhea. Several weeks later many people began suffering from alopecia (hair loss) and skin lesions. The fallout was the source of most people's radiation exposure, which has been linked to increases in leukemia and thyroid cancer. Residents of the Marshall Islands who received significant exposure to radionuclides incurred a much greater risk of developing cancer. There is a presumed association between radiation levels and female reproductive system functioning.

The female population of the Marshall Islands have a sixty times greater cervical cancer mortality than a comparable mainland United States population. The Islands populations also have a five times greater likelihood of breast or gastrointestinal mortality, and lung cancer mortality is three times higher than the mainland population. The male population on the Marshall Islands' lung cancer mortality is four times greater than the overall United States rates, and the oral cancer rates are ten times greater. Fallout produced from nuclear tests affected the residents externally and internally. External irradiation was caused by gamma rays that originated from fallout on the ground. While the levels of external radiation exposure can be reduced by sheltering indoors, the islanders spent most of their time outside. Internal exposure to radiation can occur through inhalation, ingestion, and skin exposure. The greatest exposure is from consuming contaminated food like coconut, pandanus, papaya, banana, arrowroot, taro, limes, breadfruit, and the ducks, pigs, and chickens raised on the islands.

Food shipped into the islands could also be irradiated by contaminated cooking utensils. Iodine-131, a highly radioactive isotope, can be ingested or inhaled and is concentrated in a person's thyroid.

== See also ==
- Chagai-I
- Chagai-II
