= Survey =

Survey may refer to:

- Survey (human research), including opinion polls
- Surveying, the technique and science of measuring positions and distances on Earth
- Statistical survey, a method for collecting quantitative information about items in a population
- Astronomical survey, imaging or mapping regions of the sky
- Field survey, or field research
  - Archaeological field survey, collection of information by archaeologists prior to excavation
- Geological survey, investigation of the subsurface of the ground to create a geological map or model
- Site survey, inspection of an area where work is proposed
- Vessel safety survey, required for ships
- Survey article, a scholarly publication to summarize an area of research
- Surveys, apellation of the estate holdings of the Duchy of Lancaster

== See also ==
- Surveyor (disambiguation)
- Survey says (disambiguation)
