= Surveyor (disambiguation) =

A surveyor (land surveyor) is a professional who determines positions on or near the Earth's surface.

Surveyor may also refer to:

== Professions and their activities ==
- Marine surveyor or "ship surveyor", someone who inspects and examines ships
- Quantity surveyor, someone who controls costs on construction projects
- Pollster, someone who conducts surveys or opinion polls
- Surveyor General, an official responsible for government surveying in a specific country or territory

== Ships ==
- NOAAS Surveyor (S 132), a National Oceanic and Atmospheric Administration survey ship in service from 1960 to 1995 or 1996
- USC&GS Surveyor, the name of more than one ship of the United States Coast and Geodetic Survey
- USS Surveyor (1917), an armed steamer in commission in the United States Navy from 1917 to 1919

== Other uses ==
- Surveyor (typeface), a Didone classification serif typeface
- Surveyor, Pennsylvania, a community in the United States
- The Surveyors, a 1972 Swiss film
- Surveyor magazine, a British professional weekly
- Surveyor program, a series of unmanned spaceflights to the Moon
- Mars Global Surveyor, a spacecraft sent to Mars

== See also ==
- Survey (disambiguation)
