= Project 56 =

Project 56 may refer to:

- Project 56 (nuclear test), a series of nuclear safety tests
- Project 56 (album), a 2008 album by Deadmau5
- Kotlin-class destroyer
