= Operation Golden Dragon =

Operation Golden Dragon was a combined United States-South Korea military naval training exercise in February 1973. The operation was held outside of Yang Po Ri island, South Korea. The exercise was designed to train the South Korea's naval troops and prepare South Korea for any attack from North Korea or Japan.

== Naval Ships ==
- USS Blue Ridge (LCC-19): The ship was at Okinawa before travelling to South Korea for the operation. After that, it headed to Vietnamese waters to join in the Vietnam war.
- USS Bausell (DD-845)
- USS Gurke (DD-783)
- USS Leonard F. Mason (DD-852): The destroyer was dry docked at Japan for two weeks to be repaired before heading to South Korea to participate in the operation.
- USS Tripoli (LPH-10): The ship was operating in the Philippines and Hong Kong before arriving at South Korea to contribute to the operation. Later, USS Tripoli was sent to South Vietnam to support the U.S. troops in the Vietnam war.
- USS Caliente (AO-53)

== Notes ==
Mann, Raymond A. “Blue Ridge III (LCC-19).” Naval History and Heritage Command, 7 July 2016, 1:00:47, www.history.navy.mil/content/history/nhhc/research/histories/ship-histories/danfs/b/blue-ridge-iii.html.

USS Leonard F. Mason (DD-852) The Unofficial (and More Complete) History, 1971 to Present, cosmicshipmedia.net/history2.htm.

Mooney, James L., and Arleigh Burke. Dictionary of American Naval Fighting Ships. Naval Historical Center Department of the Navy, 1991.
