= Project 57 =

1957 open-air nuclear test at the Nellis Air Force Range in Nevada, United States

Information
- Country: United States
- Test site: NTS Area 13
- Period: 1957
- Number of tests: 1
- Test type: dry surface
- Max. yield: 0

Test series chronology

Project 57 was an open-air nuclear test conducted by the U.S. Atomic Energy Commission (now the Department of Energy) at the Nellis Air Force Range on April 24, 1957, following Operation Redwing, and preceding Operation Plumbbob. The test area, also known as Area 13, was a 10 miles (16 km) by 16 miles (26 km) block of land in the western Emigrant Valley, abutting the northeast boundary of the Nevada National Security Site.

Project 57 was a combination safety test. The high explosives of a nuclear weapon were detonated asymmetrically to simulate an accidental detonation. The purposes of the test were to verify that no yield would result, study the extent of plutonium contamination, and to develop methods of both surface decontamination and biomedical evaluation techniques for use in plutonium-laden environments.

The contaminated area was initially fenced off and the contaminated equipment buried in place. In 1981, the U.S. Department of Energy decontaminated and decommissioned the site. The transportation of plutonium (which prefers to attach to smaller particles) by wind caused hundreds of thousands of cubic yards of soil and debris to be removed from Area 13 and disposed of in a waste facility at the Nevada Test Site.

United States' Project 57 series tests and detonations
Name (Note: The US, France and Great Britain have code-named their test events, while the USSR and China did not, and therefore have only test numbers (with some exceptions – Soviet peaceful explosions were named). Word translations into English in parentheses unless the name is a proper noun. A dash followed by a number indicates a member of a salvo event. The US also sometimes named the individual explosions in such a salvo test, which results in "name1 – 1(with name2)". If test is canceled or aborted, then the row data like date and location discloses the intended plans, where known.)	Date time (UT)	Local time zone (Note: To convert the UT time into standard local, add the number of hours in parentheses to the UT time; for local daylight saving time, add one additional hour. If the result is earlier than 00:00, add 24 hours and subtract 1 from the day; if it is 24:00 or later, subtract 24 hours and add 1 to the day. Historical time zone data obtained from the IANA time zone database.)	Location (Note: Rough place name and a latitude/longitude reference; for rocket-carried tests, the launch location is specified before the detonation location, if known. Some locations are extremely accurate; others (like airdrops and space blasts) may be quite inaccurate. "~" indicates a likely pro-forma rough location, shared with other tests in that same area.)	Elevation + height (Note: Elevation is the ground level at the point directly below the explosion relative to sea level; height is the additional distance added or subtracted by tower, balloon, shaft, tunnel, air drop or other contrivance. For rocket bursts the ground level is "N/A". In some cases it is not clear if the height is absolute or relative to ground, for example, Plumbbob/John. No number or units indicates the value is unknown, while "0" means zero. Sorting on this column is by elevation and height added together.)	Delivery (Note: Atmospheric, airdrop, balloon, gun, cruise missile, rocket, surface, tower, and barge are all disallowed by the Partial Nuclear Test Ban Treaty. Sealed shaft and tunnel are underground, and remained useful under the PTBT. Intentional cratering tests are borderline; they occurred under the treaty, were sometimes protested, and generally overlooked if the test was declared to be a peaceful use.) Purpose (Note: Include weapons development, weapon effects, safety test, transport safety test, war, science, joint verification and industrial/peaceful, which may be further broken down.)	Device (Note: Designations for test items where known, "?" indicates some uncertainty about the preceding value, nicknames for particular devices in quotes. This category of information is often not officially disclosed.)	Yield (Note: Estimated energy yield in tons, kilotons, and megatons. A ton of TNT equivalent is defined as 4.184 gigajoules (1 gigacalorie).)	Fallout (Note: Radioactive emission to the atmosphere aside from prompt neutrons, where known. The measured species is only iodine-131 if mentioned, otherwise it is all species. No entry means unknown, probably none if underground and "all" if not; otherwise notation for whether measured on the site only or off the site, where known, and the measured amount of radioactivity released.)	References	Notes
1	April 24, 1957 14:27:??	PST (–8 hrs)	NTS Area 13 37.31935°N 115.90608°W	1,400 m (4,600 ft) + 0	dry surface, safety experiment	XW-25	no yield			Contamination hazard test of the XW-25 air defense warhead; successful.

== See also ==
- Project 56
- Operation Roller Coaster
