= Site survey =

Inspections of an area where work is proposed, to gather information

Site surveys are inspections is an area where work is proposed, to gather information for a design or an estimate to complete the initial tasks required for an outdoor activity. It can determine a precise location, access, best orientation for the site and the location of obstacles. The type of site survey and the best practices required depend on the nature of the project. Examples of projects requiring a preliminary site survey include urban construction, specialized construction (such as the location for a telescope) and wireless network design.

In hydrocarbon exploration, for example, site surveys are run over the proposed locations of offshore exploration or appraisal wells. They consist typically of a tight grid of high resolution (high frequency) reflection seismology profiles to look for possible gas hazards in the shallow section beneath the seabed and detailed bathymetric data to look for possible obstacles on the seafloor (e.g. shipwrecks, existing pipelines) using multibeam echosounders.

== See also ==
- Wireless site survey
- Site analysis
- Survey
