= USS Sagittarius =

Cargo ship of the United States Navy

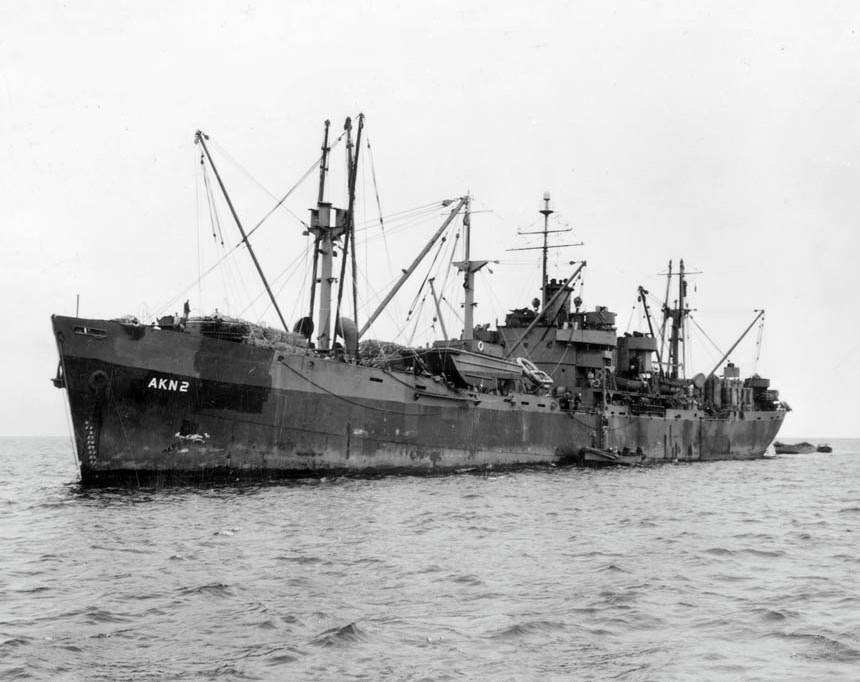
- Sagittarius preparing to lower a Sea Mule over the side in April or May 1945 during the invasion of Okinawa

History

United States
- Name: USS Sagittarius
- Namesake: Sagittarius
- Builder: Bethlehem-Fairfield Shipyard, Baltimore, Maryland
- Laid down: 8 November 1943
- Launched: 30 November 1943
- Acquired: 8 December 1943
- Commissioned: 18 March 1944
- Decommissioned: 16 January 1946
- Stricken: 7 February 1946
- Honors and awards: 2 battle stars (World War II)
- Fate: Scrapped, 1972

General characteristics
- Type: Indus-class net cargo ship
- Displacement: 14,500 long tons (14,733 t) full
- Length: 441 ft 6 in (134.57 m)
- Beam: 56 ft 11 in (17.35 m)
- Draft: 28 ft 4 in (8.64 m)
- Speed: 12.5 knots (23.2 km/h; 14.4 mph)
- Complement: 228 officers and enlisted
- Armament: 1 × 5 in (130 mm) gun; 4 × 40 mm guns

USS Sagittarius (AKN-2) was an S-class Indus net cargo ship in the service of the United States Navy in World War II. Named after the constellation Sagittarius, it was the only ship of the Navy to bear this name.

Sagittarius was laid down on 8 November 1943 as liberty ship SS J. Fred Essary (MCE hull 1835) by Bethlehem-Fairfield Shipyard, Inc., Baltimore, Maryland, under a Maritime Commission contract; launched on 30 November 1943, sponsored by Mrs. J. Fred Essary; acquired by the Navy from the Maritime Commission on a bare-boat charter on 8 December 1943; converted to a net cargo ship; and commissioned as Sagittarius (AKN-2) on 18 March 1944.

== Service history ==
Following shakedown in Chesapeake Bay, Sagittarius departed Norfolk on 1 May; transited the Panama Canal on 9 May; and arrived at San Diego on 21 May. Ten days later, she put into Pearl Harbor; and, on 8 June, she sailed for the Marianas. Arriving at Saipan on 1 August, she installed harbor defense nets there and at Tinian until early September. On 4 September, she sailed for Nouméa, New Caledonia; took on nets as cargo; and steamed for Ulithi, where she laid nets from mid-October to mid-November. She then got underway for Pearl Harbor, arriving on 29 November.

In December, Sagittarius continued on to San Francisco for repairs and alterations at Mare Island. At the end of January 1945, she headed back to Hawaii; and, in March, she steamed for Ulithi. Arriving on 2 April, she became flagship of TU 52.8.3; then waited for further routing to the Ryukyus.

Ten days later, the AKN sailed for Okinawa. She arrived in the Hagushi anchorage on 18 April; joined TF 51; and, within hours, underwent her first enemy air attack. On 28 April, she splashed her first kamikaze. On 2 May, she shifted to Nakagusuku Wan, where, as at Hagushi, the almost daily air raids continued. Despite the interruptions, however, Sagittarius conducted net laying operations until 26 May. On 27 May, having downed her second kamikaze and assisted in destroying a third, she headed for Pearl Harbor.

Steaming via the Marianas, she exploded a drifting Japanese mine one day out of Saipan, on 4 June. On 17 June, she arrived at Pearl Harbor only to depart again, laden with nets, on 8 July. From 24 July to 9 August, she conducted net operations at Ulithi, then returned to Pearl Harbor.

Arriving after the cessation of hostilities in the Pacific, Sagittarius steamed west again in mid-September; took on reclaimed nets at Ulithi; transported them to Saipan; then headed back to Pearl Harbor and San Francisco. She arrived at the latter on 19 November; and, in December, continued on to the east coast for inactivation. Sagittarius was decommissioned at Norfolk on 16 January 1946 and returned to the Maritime Commission three days later. Her name was struck from the Navy List on 7 February 1946. Sagittarius was scrapped in 1972.

== Awards ==
Sagittarius earned two battle stars during World War II.
