= W21 =

The W21 was a hydrogen bomb design for the US military. It would have used the physics package of the TX-21 bomb. The TX-21 was a weaponized version of the "Shrimp" device tested in the Bravo shot of Operation Castle. A TX-21C was tested as the Navajo shot, Operation Redwing. The TX-21 was a scaled-down version of the Runt device (M-17 hydrogen bomb). Smaller in size and weight to the Mk-17, the Mk-21 was considered as a potential missile warhead. Far more powerful than the TX-13, which was a high-yield atomic bomb developed from the Mk-6 bomb, the XW21 was to replace the XW13 in the weapons pod of the B-58 bomber and for the SM-64 Navaho missile.

At the same time the Mk-21 bomb was being developed, the Mk-15 was also being developed. A missile warhead version was developed for the Navajo, Matador and Regulus missiles (a XW29 version was designed for Snark and Redstone). The XW15 design developed into the XW39 which was eventually deployed on Redstone and Snark missiles.

The XW21 was cancelled in favor of the much smaller and lighter XW-39 in 1957. Though several hundred Mk-21 hydrogen bombs were briefly stockpiled, no W21 warheads were ever constructed.

The W21 is an example of how the rapid development of hydrogen bombs in the mid-1950s created many dead-end designs which were quickly overtaken by smaller, lighter, and more efficient weapons.
