= Survey says =

Survey says may refer to:

- "Survey says" (TV phrase), heard on the TV show Family Feud
- Survey Says (song), by The Dismemberment Plan from their 1995 album !
