= Project 56 (nuclear test) =

Series of 1950s US nuclear tests

Information
- Country: United States
- Test site: NTS, Areas 1–4, 6–10, Yucca Flat
- Period: 1955–1956
- Number of tests: 4
- Test type: dry surface
- Max. yield: 10 tonnes of TNT (42 GJ)

Test series chronology

Operation Project 56 was a series of 4 nuclear tests conducted by the United States in 1955–1956 at the Nevada Test Site. These tests followed the Operation Wigwam series and preceded the Operation Redwing series.

== Introduction ==
These experiments were safety tests, the purpose of which were to determine whether a weapon or warhead damaged in an accident would detonate with a nuclear yield, even if some or all of the high explosive components burned or detonated. The procedure for these tests was to fault the test bomb by removing a detonator wire, or perhaps all but one, for example, possibly enhancing the weapon with extra initiators or an especially enriched core, and then to fire the weapon normally (see Warhead design safety). If there is any nuclear yield in the firing, then the test is deemed a failure from a safety standpoint. A successful test will measure only the chemical explosive in the test bomb exploding, which still, of course, blasts the bomb core and causes the core material to be spread over a wide area if the test is in open air, as all the Project 56 tests were.

== Aftermath ==
Over 895 acres (362 ha) of Area 11 at the NTS were contaminated with plutonium dust and fragments. The area has become known as Plutonium Valley, and continues to be used on an intermittent basis for realistic drills in radiological monitoring and sampling operations.

United States' Project 56 series tests and detonations
Name (Note: The US, France and Great Britain have code-named their test events, while the USSR and China did not, and therefore have only test numbers (with some exceptions – Soviet peaceful explosions were named). Word translations into English in parentheses unless the name is a proper noun. A dash followed by a number indicates a member of a salvo event. The US also sometimes named the individual explosions in such a salvo test, which results in "name1 – 1(with name2)". If test is canceled or aborted, then the row data like date and location discloses the intended plans, where known.)	Date time (UT)	Local time zone (Note: To convert the UT time into standard local, add the number of hours in parentheses to the UT time; for local daylight saving time, add one additional hour. If the result is earlier than 00:00, add 24 hours and subtract 1 from the day; if it is 24:00 or later, subtract 24 hours and add 1 to the day. Historical time zone data obtained from the IANA time zone database.)	Location (Note: Rough place name and a latitude/longitude reference; for rocket-carried tests, the launch location is specified before the detonation location, if known. Some locations are extremely accurate; others (like airdrops and space blasts) may be quite inaccurate. "~" indicates a likely pro-forma rough location, shared with other tests in that same area.)	Elevation + height (Note: Elevation is the ground level at the point directly below the explosion relative to sea level; height is the additional distance added or subtracted by tower, balloon, shaft, tunnel, air drop or other contrivance. For rocket bursts the ground level is "N/A". In some cases it is not clear if the height is absolute or relative to ground, for example, Plumbbob/John. No number or units indicates the value is unknown, while "0" means zero. Sorting on this column is by elevation and height added together.)	Delivery (Note: Atmospheric, airdrop, balloon, gun, cruise missile, rocket, surface, tower, and barge are all disallowed by the Partial Nuclear Test Ban Treaty. Sealed shaft and tunnel are underground, and remained useful under the PTBT. Intentional cratering tests are borderline; they occurred under the treaty, were sometimes protested, and generally overlooked if the test was declared to be a peaceful use.) Purpose (Note: Include weapons development, weapon effects, safety test, transport safety test, war, science, joint verification and industrial/peaceful, which may be further broken down.)	Device (Note: Designations for test items where known, "?" indicates some uncertainty about the preceding value, nicknames for particular devices in quotes. This category of information is often not officially disclosed.)	Yield (Note: Estimated energy yield in tons, kilotons, and megatons. A ton of TNT equivalent is defined as 4.184 gigajoules (1 gigacalorie).)	Fallout (Note: Radioactive emission to the atmosphere aside from prompt neutrons, where known. The measured species is only iodine-131 if mentioned, otherwise it is all species. No entry means unknown, probably none if underground and "all" if not; otherwise notation for whether measured on the site only or off the site, where known, and the measured amount of radioactivity released.)	References	Notes
1	November 1, 1955 22:10:??	PST (–8 hrs)	NTS Area 11a 36.98444°N 115.96151°W	1,271 m (4,170 ft) + 0	dry surface, safety experiment	TX-15/39 primary ?	no yield			One point safety test of sealed pit, successful. Extra oralloy in the core and three zippers were used to make sure of a worst case condition in the pit for supporting fission, which would have been deemed a test failure.
2	November 3, 1955 21:15:??	PST (–8 hrs)	NTS Area 11b 36.9801°N 115.9594°W	1,263 m (4,144 ft) + 0	dry surface, safety experiment	W-25	no yield			One point safety test of W-25 sealed pit, successful. 3 zippers used to make sure of plentiful neutrons.
3	November 5, 1955 19:55:??	PST (–8 hrs)	NTS Area 11c 36.97572°N 115.95732°W	1,260 m (4,130 ft) + 0	dry surface, safety experiment	TX/W-28 primary	no yield			One point safety test of TX/W-28 primary, successful. 3 zippers used to make sure of plentiful neutrons.
4	January 18, 1956 21:30:??	PST (–8 hrs)	NTS Area 11d 36.97135°N 115.95539°W	1,252 m (4,108 ft) + 0	dry surface, safety experiment	TX/W-28 primary	10 t			One point safety test partial failure, due to large neutron initiation (6 zippers) in what would otherwise have been a just-barely-critical device.

== See also ==
- Project 57
- Operation Roller Coaster
- Nuclear weapon design
