= Helen Essary =

American syndicated columnist (1886–1951)

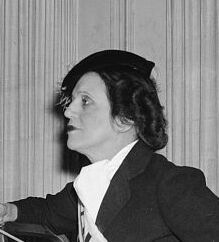
- Essary in 1940
- Born: Helen Forman Kerchner; 1886; Baltimore, Maryland, US
- Died: August 15, 1951 (aged 65); Washington, D.C., US
- Resting place: Rock Creek Cemetery
- Occupations: Journalist, columnist
- Spouses: Jesse Frederick Essary (m. 1910, d. 1942); William Murphy (m. 1944)
- Children: 3
- Writing career
- Years active: 1904–1951
- Subjects: U.S. politics, international affairs

Helen Forman Essary Murphy (née Kerchner; 1886 – August 15, 1951), known professionally as Helen Essary, was an American journalist. Beginning her newspaper career at age 18, Essary worked as a reporter, society editor, foreign correspondent and finally a syndicated columnist writing from Washington, D.C. In the New Deal era, she edited a Democratic magazine and was in the 1940s president of the Women's National Press Club. According to Alice Roosevelt Longworth's biographer, Essary may have originated a famous quip about Thomas E. Dewey looking like "the little man on the wedding cake" and attributed it to Longworth.

== Early life and career ==
Essary was born in Baltimore. She began her newspaper career at 18 as a reporter under H. L. Mencken at The Baltimore Sun and later became society editor of the Sun. She married Jesse Frederick "Fred" Essary, the Sun's Washington correspondent, in 1910, and moved to Washington.

== Syndicated columnist ==
Essary stepped back from writing for several years after her marriage, but she resumed reporting in 1926, when Fred Essary was sent to London as a Sun correspondent. She filed reports for U.S. papers from Central Europe and the League of Nations. After their return to Washington, she became a columnist for The Washington Times (later the Times-Herald). Her political column, called "Dear Washington", was syndicated to up to 40 newspapers by King Features. Writing for an isolationist paper, Essary in December 1939 interviewed Nazi German chargé d'affaires Hans Thomsen, who defended the Soviet invasion of Finland and predicted that the Soviet Union would take over Romania and the Bosporus, was shocking to many in the capital and triggered the British ambassador to cable London while disregarding Essary as "a local journalist [with] no special reputation for trustworthiness as a reporter." In 1940, she wrote a column reporting that German diplomats had become desirable dinner guests with many U.S. businessmen seeking business opportunities in Nazi Germany as its conquest of the Low Countries continued.

During the early New Deal period, Essary edited Democratic Digest, a magazine published by the Women's Democratic Club of Washington. She was president of the Women's National Press Club in 1940–41 and hosted Franklin D. Roosevelt at a club meeting—the first time a sitting president had visited the club.

Her columns covered domestic politics as well. For example, she urged New York governor and presidential candidate Thomas E. Dewey to shave his mustache in 1944, arguing that "it takes from the strength and seriousness of his face." Essary has been credited with coming up with a famous quip about Dewey: "He looks just like the little man on the wedding cake," which contributed to Dewey's public image during the 1944 presidential election. In 1968, Essary's Democratic Digest collaborator Isabel Kinnear Griffin wrote to Alice Roosevelt Longworth, to whom the quip had been widely attributed, confessing that Essary had come up with the quip, but wanting it to get a broader audience for it than their magazine, the two women had attended an embassy party and asked everyone in attendance if it was true that Longworth had made the remark—which resulted in Washington society spreading the word that Longworth had indeed said it.

She interviewed then-Vice President Harry S. Truman shortly before the death of Roosevelt and found him to have an unexpectedly "vigorous, lively personality." Essary also covered the trial in the murder of Harry Oakes for the Times-Herald.

== Personal life ==
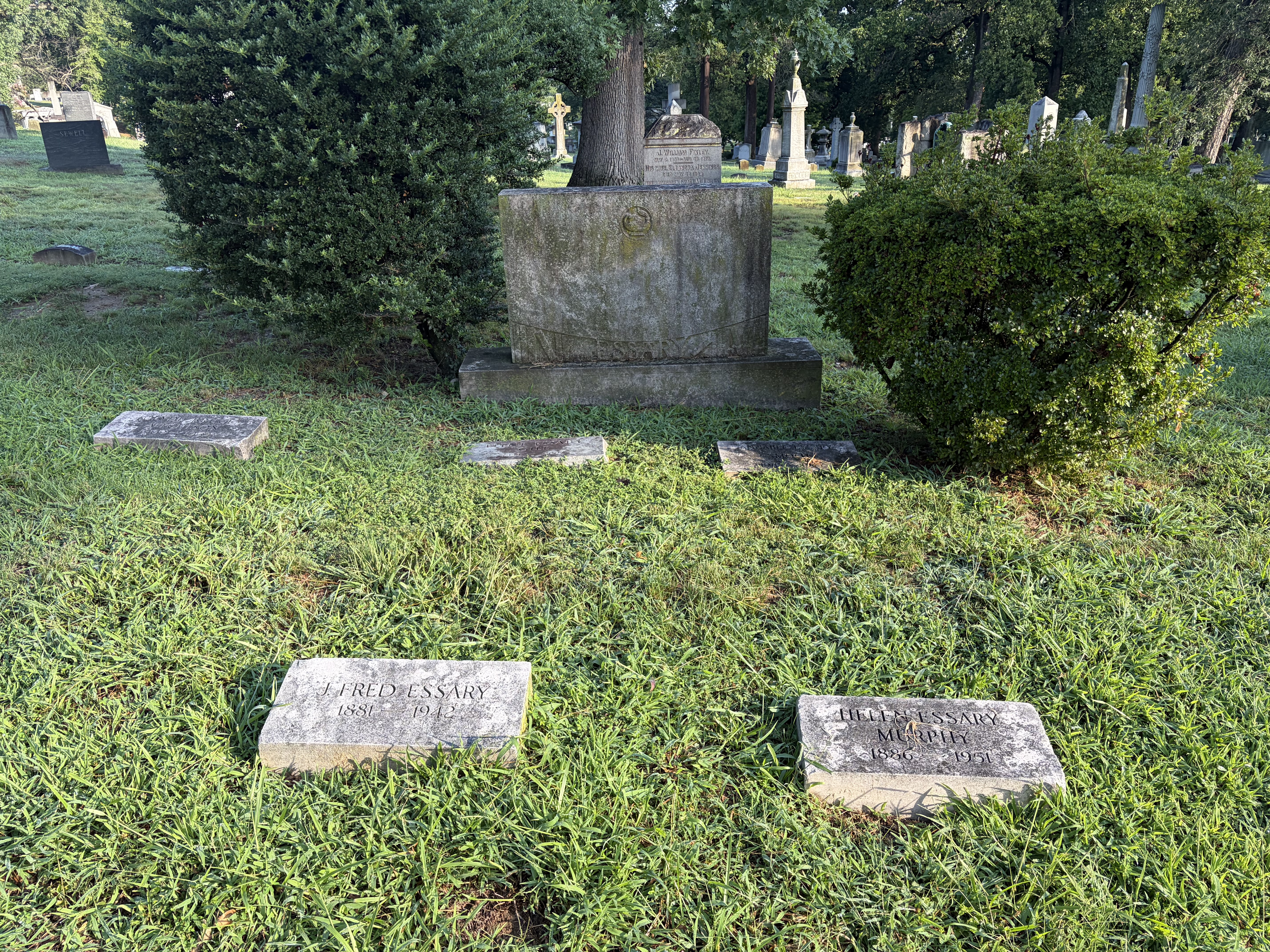
Helen Essary's grave (right) alongside Fred Essary's in Rock Creek Cemetery

Essary's first husband died in 1942, and she funded a $3,000 journalism prize at George Washington University in his memory. They had three daughters. She remarried to William Murphy in 1944, although she continued to publish under the name Helen Essary. She died in Washington of cancer in 1951 at the age of 65. She was buried in Rock Creek Cemetery.

Essary had family ties to fellow Baltimorean Wallis Simpson and was good friends with Simpson's aunt "Bessie" Merryman. In 1943, Essary hosted a private cocktail party to introduce the duke and duchess of Windsor to Washington society during the duke's time as governor of the Bahamas.
