= USC&GS Surveyor =

USC&GS Surveyor or NOAA Ship Surveyor has been the name of more than one United States Coast and Geodetic Survey or National Oceanic and Atmospheric Administration ship, and may refer to:

- USC&GS Surveyor (1917), a survey ship in service in the Coast and Geodetic Survey in 1917 and from 1919 to 1956
- USC&GS Surveyor (OSS 32), an ocean survey ship in service in the Coast and Geodetic Survey from 1960 to 1970 which then served as the survey ship NOAAS Surveyor (S 132) with the National Oceanic and Atmospheric Administration from 1970 to 1996
