= Operation Redwing =

Series of 1950s US nuclear tests

- Redwing-Cherokee, 3.8Mt. First air-deployed thermonuclear weapons test by the United States.

Information
- Country: United States
- Test site: Aomon (Sally), Enewetak Atoll; Bokon (Irene), Enewetak Atoll; Ebiriru (Ruby), Enewetak Atoll; Elugelab (Flora), Enewetak Atoll; Eninmen (Tare), Bikini Atoll; Namu (Charlie), Bikini Atoll; NE Lagoon, Bikini Atoll; Rujoru (Pearl), Enewetak Atoll; Runit (Yvonne), Enewetak Atoll; Yurochi aka Irioj (Dog), Bikini Atoll
- Period: 1956
- Number of tests: 17
- Test type: barge, dry surface, free air drop, tower
- Max. yield: 5 megatonnes of TNT (21 PJ)

Test series chronology

Operation Redwing was a United States series of 17 nuclear test detonations from May to July 1956. They were conducted at Bikini and Enewetak atolls by Joint Task Force 7 (JTF7). The entire operation followed Project 56 and preceded Project 57. The primary intention was to test new, second-generation thermonuclear weapons. Also tested were fission devices intended to be used as primaries for thermonuclear weapons, and small tactical weapons for air defense. Redwing demonstrated the first United States airdrop of a deliverable hydrogen bomb during test Cherokee. Because the yields for many tests at Operation Castle in 1954 were dramatically higher than predictions, Redwing was conducted using an "energy budget": There were limits to the total amount of energy released, and the amount of fission yield was also strictly controlled. Fission, primarily "fast" fission of the natural uranium tamper surrounding the fusion capsule, greatly increases the yield of thermonuclear devices, and constitutes the great majority of the fallout, as nuclear fusion is a relatively clean reaction.

All shots were named after various Native American tribes.

== Redwing series tests ==
United States' Redwing series tests and detonations
Name (Note: The United States, France and Great Britain have code-named their test events, while the USSR and China did not, and therefore have only test numbers (with some exceptions – Soviet peaceful explosions were named). Word translations into English in parentheses unless the name is a proper noun. A dash followed by a number indicates a member of a salvo event. The US also sometimes named the individual explosions in such a salvo test, which results in "name1 – 1(with name2)". If test is canceled or aborted, then the row data like date and location discloses the intended plans, where known.)	Date time (UT)	Local time zone (Note: To convert the UT time into standard local, add the number of hours in parentheses to the UT time; for local daylight saving time, add one additional hour. If the result is earlier than 00:00, add 24 hours and subtract 1 from the day; if it is 24:00 or later, subtract 24 hours and add 1 to the day. All historical time zone data are derived from here:)	Location (Note: Rough place name and a latitude/longitude reference; for rocket-carried tests, the launch location is specified before the detonation location, if known. Some locations are extremely accurate; others (like airdrops and space blasts) may be quite inaccurate. "~" indicates a likely pro-forma rough location, shared with other tests in that same area.)	Elevation + height (Note: Elevation is the ground level at the point directly below the explosion relative to sea level; height is the additional distance added or subtracted by tower, balloon, shaft, tunnel, air drop or other contrivance. For rocket bursts the ground level is "N/A". In some cases it is not clear if the height is absolute or relative to ground, for example, Plumbbob/John. No number or units indicates the value is unknown, while "0" means zero. Sorting on this column is by elevation and height added together.)	Delivery (Note: Atmospheric, airdrop, balloon, gun, cruise missile, rocket, surface, tower, and barge are all disallowed by the Partial Nuclear Test Ban Treaty (PTBT). Sealed shaft and tunnel are underground, and remained useful under the PTBT. Intentional cratering tests are borderline; they occurred under the treaty, were sometimes protested, and generally overlooked if the test was declared to be a peaceful use.) Purpose (Note: Include weapons development, weapon effects, safety test, transport safety test, war, science, joint verification and industrial/peaceful, which may be further broken down.)	Device (Note: Designations for test items where known, "?" indicates some uncertainty about the preceding value, nicknames for particular devices in quotes. This category of information is often not officially disclosed.)	Yield (Note: Estimated energy yield in tons, kilotons, and megatons. A ton of TNT equivalent is defined as 4.184 gigajoules (1 gigacalorie).)	Fallout (Note: Radioactive emission to the atmosphere aside from prompt neutrons, where known. The measured species is only iodine-131 if mentioned, otherwise it is all species. No entry means unknown, probably none if underground and "all" if not; otherwise notation for whether measured on the site only or off the site, where known, and the measured amount of radioactivity released.)	References	Notes
Lacrosse	May 4, 1956 18:25:29.9	MHT (11 hrs)	Runit (Yvonne), Enewetak Atoll 11.55392°N 162.34808°E	2 m (6 ft 7 in) + 5 m (16 ft)	dry surface, weapons development	TX-39 primary	40 kt			Mockup of the TX-39. Left a visible Crater off Runit Island, next to Cactus Dome, 600 ft (180 m) in diameter.
Cherokee	May 20, 1956 17:50:38.7	MHT (11 hrs)	Namu (Charlie), Bikini Atoll 11.73973°N 165.33985°E	0 + 1,320 m (4,330 ft)	free air drop, weapons development	TX-15-X1	3.8 Mt			The United States' first air deliverable thermonuclear device. Navigation error landed weapon 4 mi (6.4 km) off aim point (Namu), negated effects data gathering and placing unprotected military personnel facing the blast they had been arranged to have their backs to. The air force identified the test technician that disclosed the miss as Airman First Class Jackson H. Kilgore, for which he was reprimanded. Effects test, but also an international political statement about readiness to drop thermonuclear weapons.
Zuni	May 27, 1956 17:56:00.3	MHT (11 hrs)	Eninmen (Tare), Bikini Atoll 11.50325°N 165.37049°E	2 m (6 ft 7 in) + 3 m (9.8 ft)	dry surface, weapons development	Mk-41 Bassoon	3.5 Mt			First test of 3 stage device. Clean version using lead tamper, 85% fusion; Tewa is dirty version of same bomb. Design evolved into Mk-41, largest deployed US bomb.
Yuma	May 27, 1956 19:56:??	MHT (11 hrs)	Aomon (Sally), Enewetak Atoll 11.61569°N 162.31935°E	2 m (6 ft 7 in) + 60 m (200 ft)	tower, weapons development	Swift	190 t			Smallest (5 in (130 mm) diameter), lightest (96 lb (44 kg)) air defense warhead to date, a boosted, asymmetrical linear implosion device. Fizzled when boost didn't work.
Erie	May 30, 1956 18:15:29.3	MHT (11 hrs)	Runit (Yvonne), Enewetak Atoll 11.53999°N 162.35793°E	2 m (6 ft 7 in) + 90 m (300 ft)	tower, weapons development	TX-28C primary	14.9 kt			Test of boosted primary for TX-28C (for "clean") thermonuke.
Seminole	June 6, 1956 00:55:30.0	MHT (11 hrs)	Bokon (Irene), Enewetak Atoll 11.67226°N 162.210367°E	2 m (6 ft 7 in) + 2 m (6 ft 7 in)	dry surface, weapons development	TX-28 primary	13.7 kt			Exploded in a water tank to simulate underground nuke test. Left crater 660 ft × 32 ft (201.2 m × 9.8 m).
Blackfoot	June 11, 1956 18:26:00.3	MHT (11 hrs)	Runit (Yvonne), Enewetak Atoll 11.54598°N 162.35252°E	2 m (6 ft 7 in) + 60 m (200 ft)	tower, weapons development		8 kt			Small air defense prototype. A near-minimal diameter spherical implosion system, 11.5 in (290 mm) in diameter.
Flathead	June 11, 1956 18:26:00.1	MHT (11 hrs)	NE Lagoon, Bikini Atoll 11.6°N 165.4514°E	0 + 4.5 m (15 ft)	barge, weapons development	TX-28S	365 kt			TX-28S (for "salted") test, intentionally dirty high fallout, 73% fission.
Kickapoo	June 13, 1956 23:26:??	MHT (11 hrs)	Aomon (Sally), Enewetak Atoll 11.61569°N 162.31935°E	2 m (6 ft 7 in) + 90 m (300 ft)	tower, weapons development	Swallow	1.5 kt			Linear implosion, air defense warhead test.
Osage	June 16, 1956 01:13:53.1	MHT (11 hrs)	Runit (Yvonne), Enewetak Atoll 11.54374°N 162.35408°E	0 + 210 m (690 ft)	free air drop, weapons development	XW-25	1.7 kt			Proof test of XW-25.
Inca	June 21, 1956 21:26:??	MHT (11 hrs)	Rujoru (Pearl), Enewetak Atoll 11.62831°N 162.28828°E	2 m (6 ft 7 in) + 60 m (200 ft)	tower, weapons development	XW-45 Swan	15.2 kt			Test of tactical warhead, evolved into XW-45.
Dakota	June 25, 1956 18:06:00.2	MHT (11 hrs)	NE Lagoon, Bikini Atoll 11.6028°N 165.4514°E	0 + 2 m (6 ft 7 in)	barge, weapons development	TX-28C	1.1 Mt			Prototype of XW-28C. Became the most versatile, widely used design in the US, from 1958 to 1990.
Mohawk	July 2, 1956 18:06:??	MHT (11 hrs)	Ebiriru (Ruby), Enewetak Atoll 11.62717°N 162.29393°E	2 m (6 ft 7 in) + 90 m (300 ft)	tower, weapons development	Swan/Flute	360 kt			
Apache	July 8, 1956 18:06:00.2	MHT (11 hrs)	Elugelab (Flora), Enewetak Atoll 11.66451°N 162.19446°E	0 + 2 m (6 ft 7 in)	barge, weapons development	XW-27 / Zither	1.9 Mt			Same primary as Lacrosse; Prototype of XW-27 warhead for Regulus missile.
Navajo	July 10, 1956 17:56:00.3	MHT (11 hrs)	NE Lagoon, Bikini Atoll 11.68743°N 165.38263°E	0 + 6 m (20 ft)	barge, weapons development	TX-21C	4.5 Mt			95% fusion, cleanest shot fired until 1958.
Tewa	July 20, 1956 17:46:00.0	MHT (11 hrs)	Yurochi aka Irioj (Dog), Bikini Atoll 11.67896°N 165.34042°E	0 + 4.5 m (15 ft)	barge, weapons development	Mk-41 ? "Bassoon Prime"	5 Mt			87% fission; first US 3 stage device, dirty version of Bassoon tested in Zuni, with tamper change. Developed into Mk-41.
Huron	July 21, 1956 18:16:00.1	MHT (11 hrs)	Elugelab (Flora), Enewetak Atoll 11.6719°N 162.3692°E	0 + 2 m (6 ft 7 in)	barge, weapons development	XW-50 ? Proto "Egg"	250 kt			2 Stage thermonuke, XW-50 prototype.

== Gallery ==
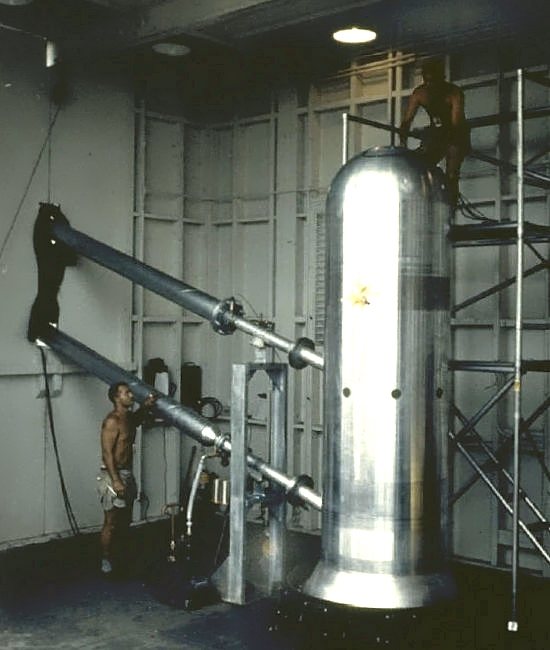
Redwing-Tewa device within shot-cab.

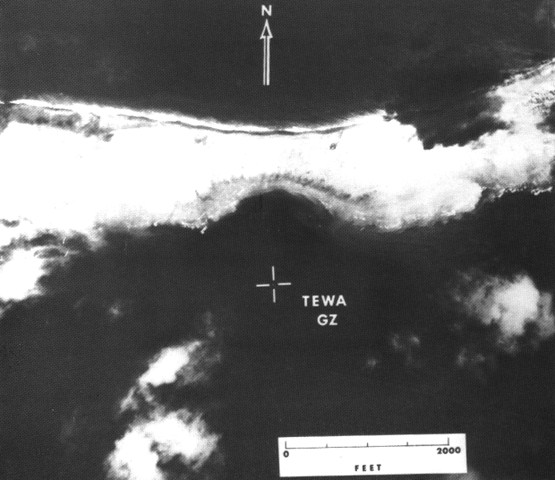
Redwing-Tewa event crater.

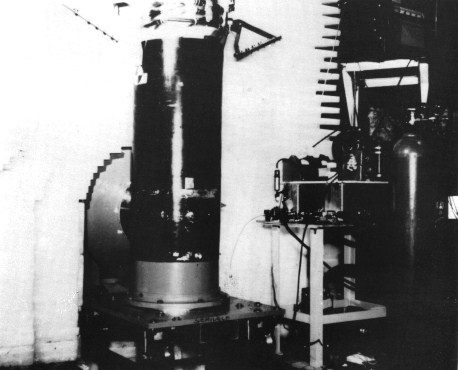
Redwing-Seminole test device.

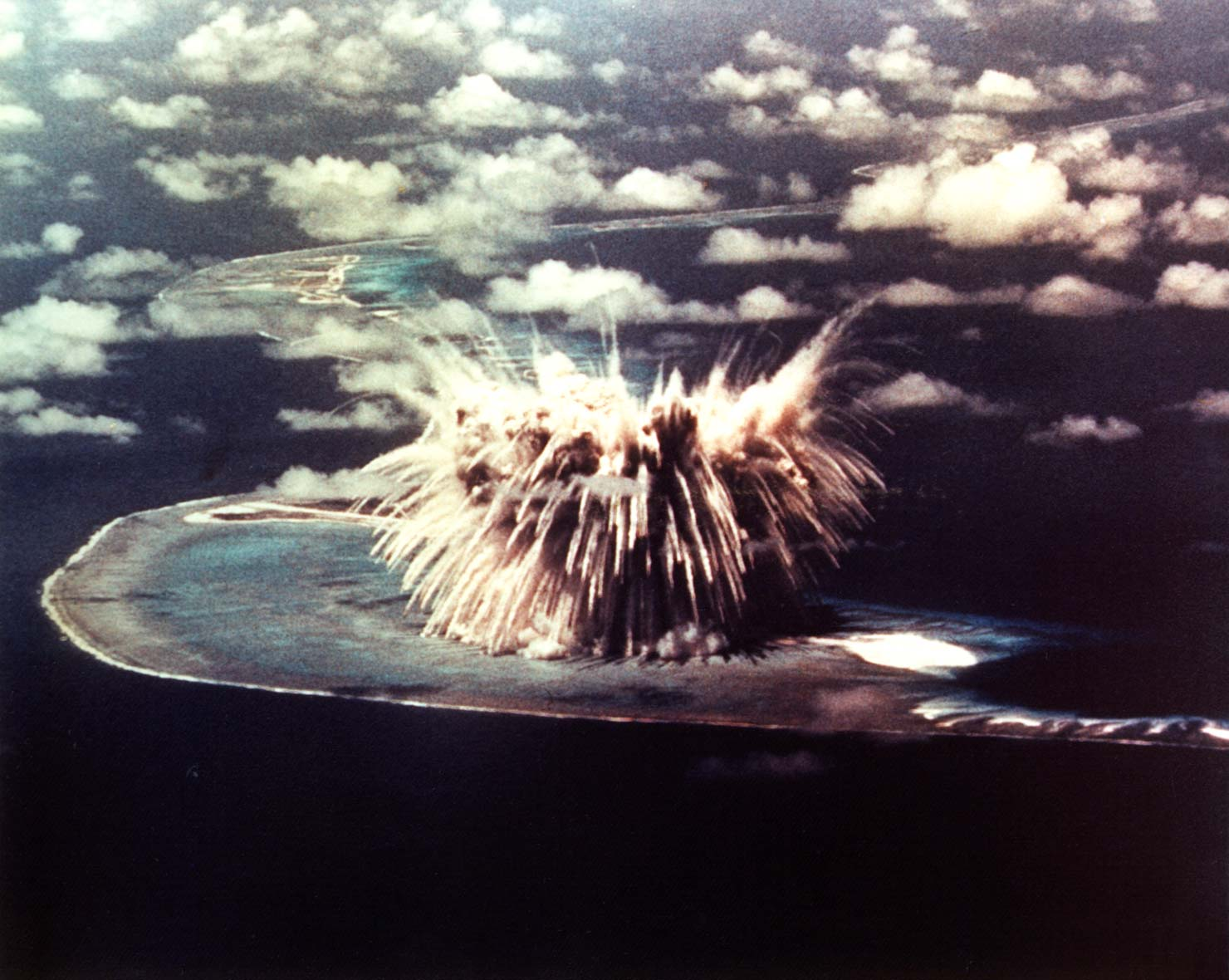
Redwing-Seminole, 13.7-kilotons.

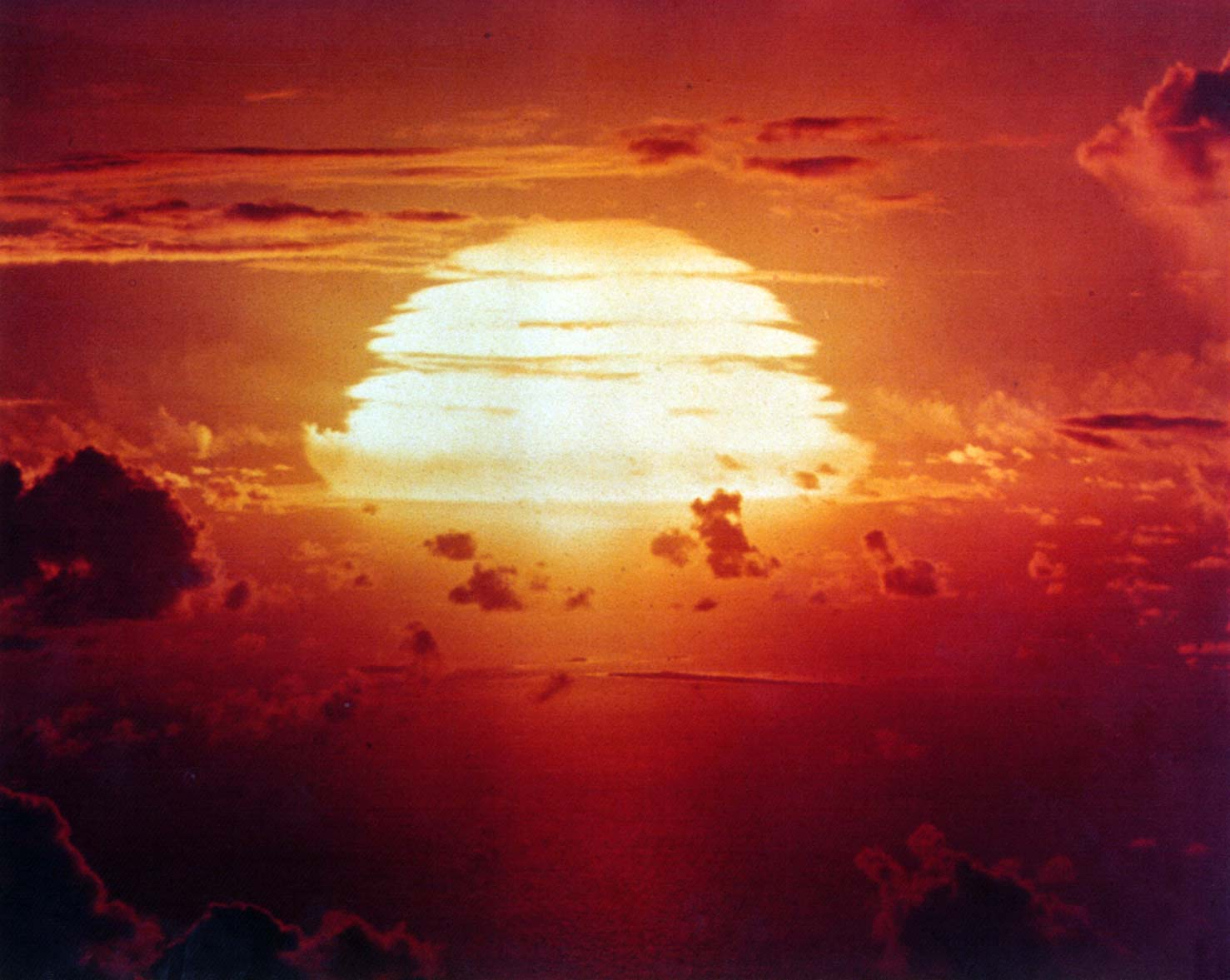
Redwing-Apache, 1.8-megatons.

Redwing-Zuni, 3.5-megatons.

Redwing-Tewa, 5-megatons.

Redwing-Lacrosse, 40-kilotons.

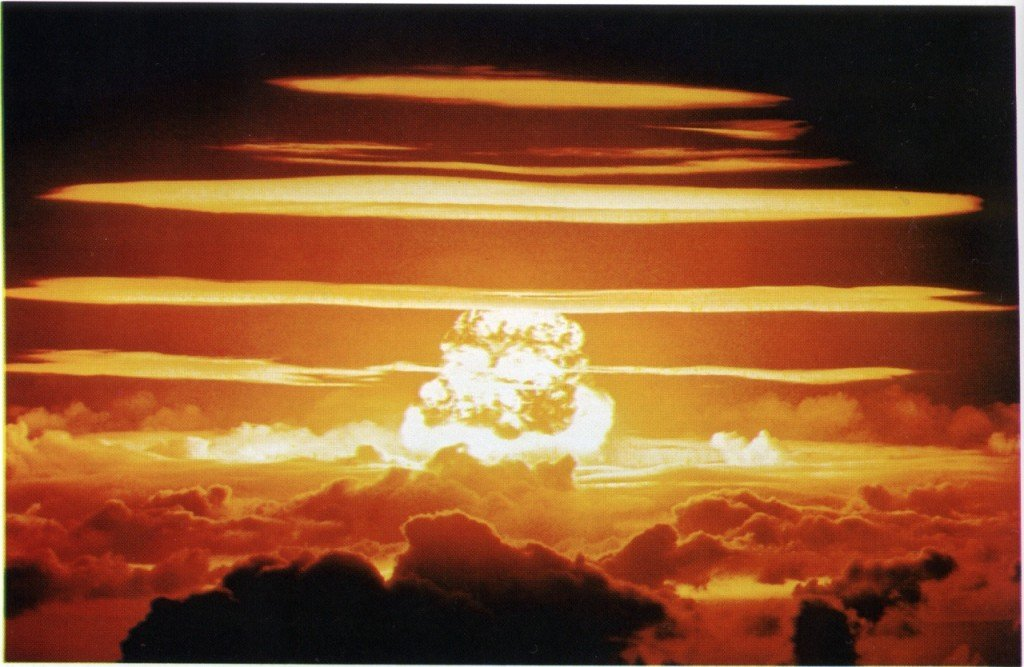
Redwing-Dakota., 1.1-megatons.

Redwing-Cherokee, 3.8-megatons.

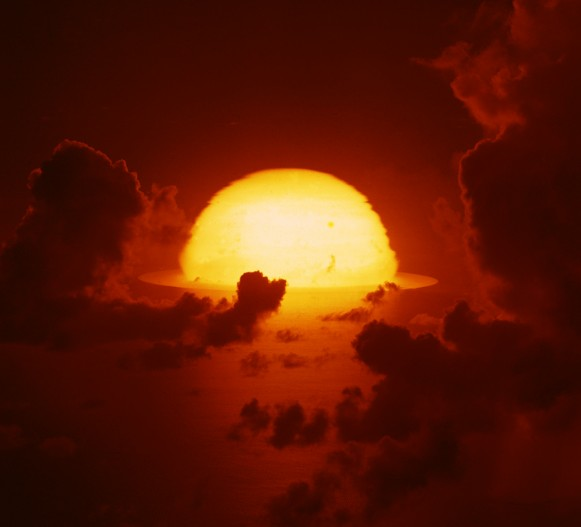
Redwing-Huron, 250-kilotons.
