= Jesse Frederick Essary =

American journalist

Jesse Frederick Essary (August 22, 1881 – March 11, 1942) was an American journalist. He was part of the White House press corps in the decades before the Second World War.

== Education and career ==
Born in Washburn, Tennessee., north of Knoxville, on August 22, 1881, Essary was the son of attorney John Thurman Essary and Maetta Hill Essary. He graduated from Nashville's Montgomery Bell Academy in 1899, attended Emory and Henry College, and entered the newspaper trade in 1903 with the Norfolk Ledger in Virginia. With a knack for being in the right place at the right time, Essary was one of just two reporters on hand at Kitty Hawk in April 1908 as the Wright brothers made their first public flights, disproving skeptics who had called them “better liars than flyers.”.

Essary moved on to become Washington correspondent for a series of papers before 1912 settling in at the Baltimore Sun, where he remained for the rest of his 39-year career.

Essary went to Versailles with President Wilson for peace negotiations in 1919.

He was president of the Gridiron Club.

In late 1925, he moved to the Sun's London bureau for a year.

He was the author of Covering Washington (1927) -- surprisingly familiar accounts of spin and manipulation.

The Post reported that "President [Franklin] Roosevelt came to know Essary so well that he could recognize his deep baritone at crowded White House press conferences and would call him by name even when he could not see him.".

== Retirement and death ==
He retired as bureau chief in late 1941, remaining as a correspondent. J. Fred Essary died in his Washington office on March 11, 1942, aged 60.

On his death, President Roosevelt sent personal condolences to the widow, while Secretary of State Cordell Hull, a Tennessean, wrote to her that “Fred and I were close personal friends for 35 years.” Senate Majority Leader Alben Barkley paid tribute to him on the Senate floor. Colleague H.L. Mencken was among the active pallbearers.

The Washington Post editorialized: "It was not even because his career as Washington correspondent extended over nine administrations that he was called 'the Dean' by his colleagues.... The term was primarily one of affection and respect pinned onto him by younger men who looked up to him as a friend and guide and an exemplar of what a Washington correspondent ought to be."

== Sources ==
"Newspaper Man to Make Change." Washington Post, March 3, 1912.

"Newspaper Men Sent 'Leak' Wires." (Essary's role in insider trading scandal) New York Times, Feb. 4, 1917

"'Covering Washington' Relates Story of Work of Correspondent Here." Washington Post, June 26, 1927.

"J. F. Essary Dead; Noted Journalist." New York Times, March 12, 1942.

"J. Fred Essary" (editorial). Washington Post, March 12, 1942.

The American Literary Yearbook. A biographical and bibliographical dictionary of living North American authors. Volume 1, 1919. Edited by Hamilton Traub. Henning, MN: Paul Traub, 1919.

Biography Index. A cumulative index to biographical material in books and magazines. Volume 2: August, 1949-August, 1952. New York: H.W. Wilson Co., 1953.

Who Was Who in America. A companion biographical reference work to Who's Who in America. Volume 2, 1943-1950. Chicago: A.N. Marquis Co., 1963.

List of Liberty ships including one named for Essary.
