= Darlene Keju =

Marshallese activist (1951–1996)

- Occupation: Activist
- Spouse: Giff Johnson

Darlene Keju, also known as Darlene Keju-Johnson, (1951 – June 18, 1996) was a Marshallese activist. She was born on Ebeye Island in the Marshall Islands group in 1951. The Northern Islands where she grew up were downwind from Bikini and Enewetak atolls where the United States tested 67 nuclear weapons. She witnessed the evacuation of Regelap and Utirik Atolls after they were contaminated by radioactive fallout. Keju is credited for bringing to the attention of the world the suffering of the Marshall Islanders as a result of the nuclear testing and that many more people were affected than acknowledged by the U.S. government.

The book Don't Ever Whisper written by her husband Giff Johnson tells of her fight to share the Marshall Islanders' plight with the rest of the world wasn't being told of the events. He was interviewed by ABC Radio presenter Geraldine Coutts in 2013. On June 17, 2006 she was commemorated on the 20th anniversary of the founding of Youth-to-Youth in Health (YTYIH) organization, which she established in 1986.

== Activism ==
She researched nuclear testing impacts on the small downwind outer islands, which led her to reveal to the world the existence of birth defects and "jelly-fish" babies in Marshallese communities. Through speaking tours in the U.S., Canada and Europe, she told the story of Marshall Islands nuclear test survivors — their forced relocations to allow the nuclear weapons to be tested, the exposure of thousands of people to radioactive fallout, and the damage to the islands from the testing and fallout.

She was a pioneering critic of the U.S. government's response, charging that its limited health care programs were inadequate to address the many islanders affected by fallout. Formerly secret U.S. government reports declassified around the time of her death from breast cancer in 1996 confirmed her statements from the 1980s that many more than the four U.S. acknowledged atolls were actually contaminated with radioactive fallout from multiple nuclear weapons tests.

In 1983 she stood on the podium and told a global church audience in Vancouver at the Pacific Plenary of the World Council of Churches Assembly, an event that was held every seven to eight years, about the radioactive fallout from the 67 nuclear tests being more widespread than the U.S. had admitted. She spoke of the many unrecognized health issues in the Marshall Islands.

The WCC event brought together hundreds of church leaders from around the world. Netherlands based Madeleen Helmar who has worked on Pacific issues said "Her impressive speech tore up the curtain of silence around the nuclear legacy in the Pacific (and) caused a wave that went as far as Europe, where it landed on the fertile ground of the anti-nuclear movement." ABC Pacific correspondent Sean Dorney referred to an online clip posted by the World Council of Churches of her giving the speech as an "extremely moving address".

In 2013 she was posthumously named 2013 Pacific Person of the Year by Islands Business. Islands Business said the recognition came because of her fearless innovation. Also years after her death with the issues confronting Pacific Islanders today, her words and actions continued to speak to the key issues of the day.

== Personal ==
Keju was born on Ebeye Island in Kwajalein Atoll, but was raised on her mother's atoll, Wotje. She lived in Hawaii for 17 years where she graduated from President Theodore Roosevelt High School, Kapiʻolani Community College, Chaminade College and the University of Hawaiʻi's School of Public Health. She returned to the Marshall Islands in 1984 with a master's degree in public health.

She was married for 14 years to Pacific journalist and Marshall Islands Journal editor, Giff Johnson.

She died of breast cancer at age 45 on June 18, 1996. A celebration of her life with short speeches and Marshallese music was held at the Church of the Crossroads, 1212 University Ave in Hawaii.
