= Ulamila Kurai Wragg =

Fijian journalist

Ulamila Kurai Wragg (born 18 June 1968) is a Fijian journalist based in Rarotonga, Cook Islands.

== Personal life ==
Wragg was born in Natewa, Fiji, and is the daughter of the Fijian chief Ratu Tevita Vakalalabure (the Vunivalu of Natewa) and Nooroa Edna Tupuna Strickland (of the Tearetoa and Strickland families of Aitutaki, Cook Islands). She is the younger sister of former politician Ratu Rakuita Vakalalabure. She was educated at Adi Cakobau School, and at Rotorua Girls High School in New Zealand, before pursuing higher education at the University of the South Pacific in Fiji, and the University of Otago and the University of Canterbury in New Zealand. She moved to the Cook Islands after the 2000 Fijian coup d'état and married Graham Wragg. The couple have four children – Adi Tara Chloe-Ane, Henry, Jean and Ratu Tevita. The family resides in Vaima'anga, Rarotonga, Cook Islands.

== Career ==
Wragg's career as a journalist in the Pacific region spans over twenty years as of 2008. Her first job was as a writer with Rubine Public Relations Company in Suva, Fiji. She next took a position as a reporter for Communications Fiji, Ltd., which is Fiji's largest commercial radio company.

Wragg was hired by publisher Floyd Takeuchi as a senior reporter for The Daily Post. Following a stint at The Daily Post, Wragg took posts as a sub-editor at both the Fiji Times and the Fiji Sun. Additionally, Wragg led a team which developed the Fiji Sun's Sunday Magazine.

Wragg relocated to the Cook Islands to take a position as a writer with the Pitt Media Group. She also joined the Cook Islands News as a reporter. Wragg was later promoted to deputy editor of the Cook Islands News, a position she held until her departure from the newspaper in May 2008. Wragg has also worked as a correspondent for Radio Australia in the Cook Islands.

On October 1, 2008, Floyd Takeuchi, the publisher of Pacific Magazine, appointed Wragg as the managing editor of Pacific Magazine. She replaced editor Giff Johnson, who had supervised Pacific Magazine's transition from a print publication to a strictly online magazine. Takeuchi had previously hired Wragg as a reporter at The Daily Post. Wragg had also worked as Pacific Magazine's Cook Islands correspondent before her appointment as its editor. Takeuchi praised Wragg, saying, "I’m extremely pleased that Ulamila Wragg is joining us as Managing Editor...she’s one of the finest journalists working in the region." Pacific Magazine suspended operations on January 1, 2009, citing the 2008 financial crisis and a decline in advertising revenue.

In December 2008, Wragg co-founded the Pacific NGO "WAVE" (Woman Advancing a Vision of Empowerment) with the Cook Islands-born journalist Lisa Williams. WAVE is a not-for-profit Pacific network with three thematic areas: climate change, HIV/Aids and Violence Against Women.

Since 2009, Wragg has been part of the Cook Islands' delegation to the United Nations Framework Convention on Climate Change.
