= Castle Union =

Hydrogen bomb test

Coordinates: 11°41′02″N 165°24′36″E

- The Castle Union test of the Mark 14 design

Information
- Country: United States
- Test series: Operation Castle
- Test site: Bikini Atoll
- Date: 26 April 1954; 72 years ago
- Test type: Atmospheric
- Yield: 6.9 megatons of TNT

Test chronology

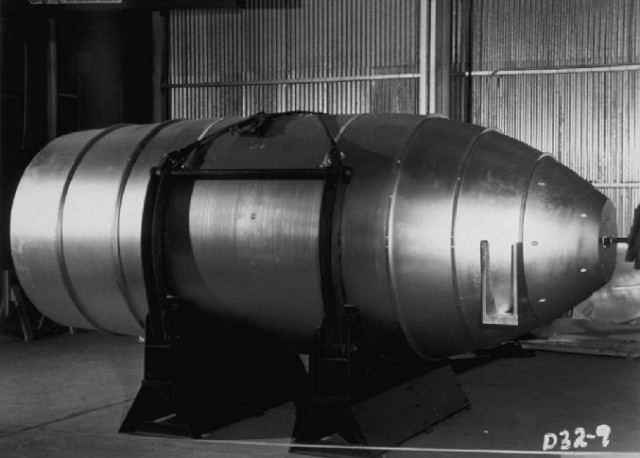
Mark 14 nuclear bomb

Castle Union was the code name given to one of the tests in the Operation Castle series of United States nuclear tests. It was the first test of the TX-14 thermonuclear weapon (initially the "emergency capability" EC-14), one of the first deployed U.S. thermonuclear bombs.

An "Alarm Clock" device is a "dry" fusion bomb, using lithium deuteride fuel for the fusion stage of a "staged" fusion bomb, unlike the cryogenic liquid deuterium of the first-generation Ivy Mike fusion device.

It differed from the Castle Romeo "Runt" device, tested shortly before, in using highly enriched lithium (approximately 95% lithium-6; natural lithium is a mixture of lithium-6 and lithium-7 isotopes). The "Runt" device had 7.5% lithium-6 in the fusion fuel.

The test took place on 26 April 1954 at Bikini Atoll of the Marshall Islands, on a barge moored in the lagoon, off Yurochi island. The yield of 6.9 megatons of TNT was roughly double the predicted 3-4 megatons. Although the barge had been moored in over 160 feet (49 m) of water, the test left a crater 3,000 feet (910 m) in diameter and 90 feet (27 m) deep in the bottom of the lagoon.

Like the Ivy Mike, Castle Bravo, and Castle Romeo tests, a large percentage of the yield was produced by fast fission of the natural uranium tamper, which contributed to the extensive fallout caused by these tests.

As the highly enriched lithium was both expensive and scarce at the time, it limited the number of these weapons that could be produced. The "Runt" design tested in Castle Romeo and Castle Yankee was preferred for deployment.
