= Mark 14 nuclear bomb =

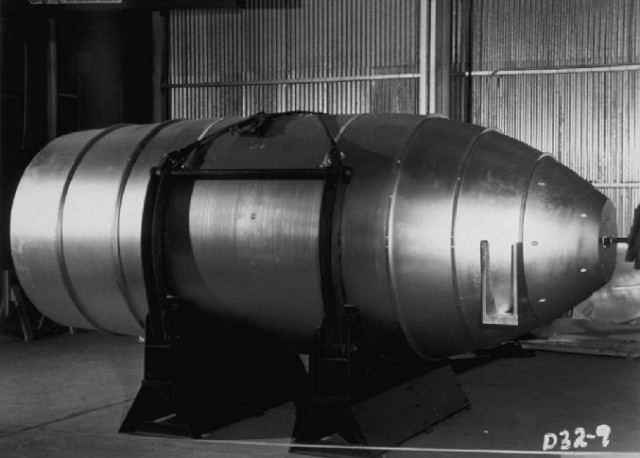
- A photo of a Mk14 without tail section attached
- Type: Thermonuclear gravity bomb
- Place of origin: United States

Service history
- In service: 1954-1956
- Wars: Cold War

Production history
- Designer: Los Alamos National Laboratory
- Designed: 1954
- Produced: Feb-Oct 1954
- No. built: 5

Specifications
- Mass: 28,950–31,000 lb (13,130–14,060 kg)
- Length: 222 in (5.6 m)
- Diameter: 61.4 in (156 cm)
- Detonation mechanism: Air burst
- Blast yield: 5–7 megatonnes of TNT (21–29 PJ) (deployed Mk-14); 6.9 megatonnes of TNT (29 PJ) (Castle Union test device)

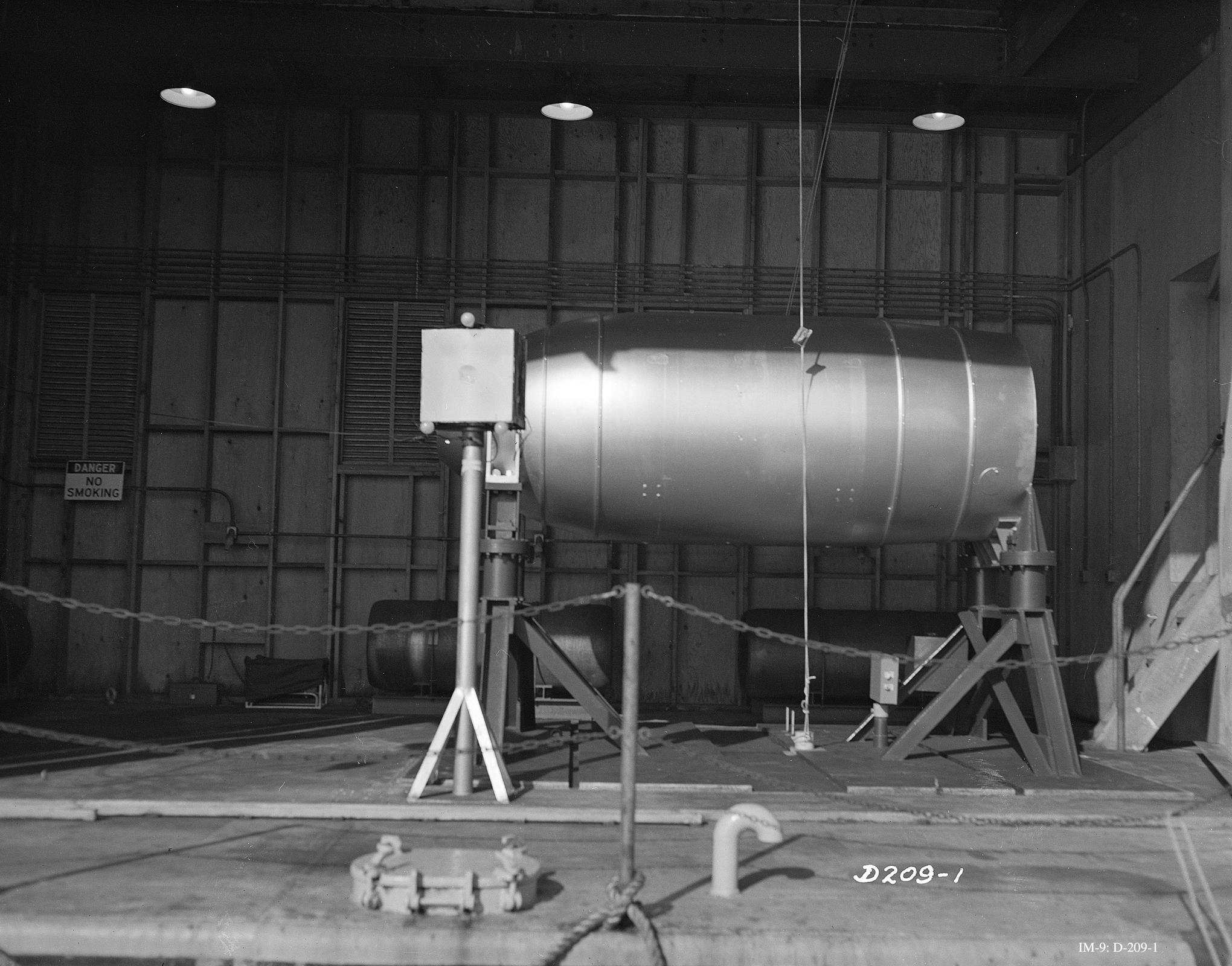
A test device in a Mark 14 casing during Operation Castle, possibly the Castle Union test of the Mark 14 design.

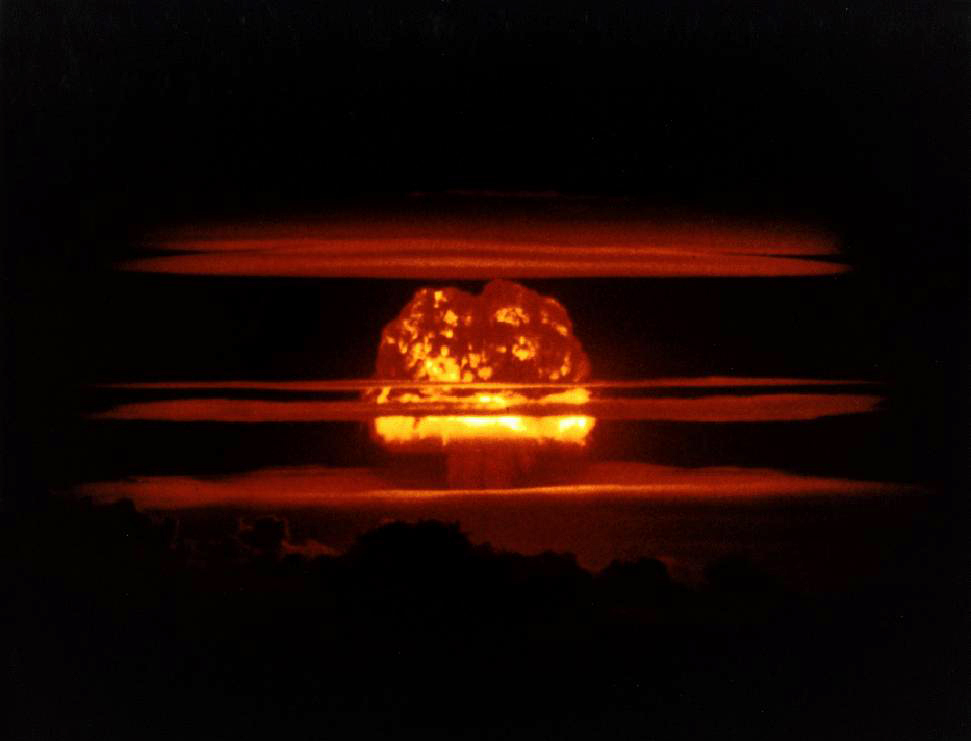
The Castle Union test of the Mark 14 design.

The Mark 14 nuclear bomb was a 1950s strategic thermonuclear weapon, the first deployed solid-fuel hydrogen bomb. It was an experimental design, and only five units were produced in early 1954. It was tested in April 1954 during the Castle Union nuclear test and had a yield of 6.9 Mt. The bomb is often listed as the TX-14 (for "experimental") or EC-14 (for "Emergency Capability"). It has also been referred to as the "Alarm Clock" device though it has nothing to do with the design by the same name proposed earlier by Edward Teller and known as the Sloika in the Soviet Union.

The fusion fuel used by the bomb was 95% enriched Lithium isotope 6 lithium deuteride, which at the time was a scarce resource, this scarcity being chiefly responsible for its limited deployment. The Castle Bravo test showed that unenriched Lithium isotope 7 functioned as well for nuclear fusion reactions as isotope 6. The Mk-14 bomb had a diameter of 61.4 inches (1.56 m) and a length of 222 inches (5.64 m). They weighed between 28,950 and 31,000 pounds (13,100 and 14,100 kg), and used a 64 feet (20 m) parachute.

The version tested at Castle Union used a RACER IV primary. 5 Mt of its total yield came from fission, making it a very "dirty" weapon.

By 1956, the components of all five of the produced Mk-14 bombs had been recycled into Mark 17s.

== See also ==
- List of nuclear weapons
