= Pacific Magazine =

- Staff writers: Giff Johnson; David Miho; Fili Sagapolutele; Alex Rheeney
- Categories: Current events Culture; News; Politics; Pacific Island issues
- Frequency: Bi-monthly until July 2008, e-zine until January 1, 2009
- Founded: 1976
- Final issue: 2008
- Company: TransOceanic Media
- Country: USA
- Based in: Honolulu
- Language: English
- Website: www.pacificmagazine.net
- ISSN: 1533-3183

Pacific Magazine was a regional news and current affairs magazine and online news agency specializing in the coverage of the Pacific Islands region, including Melanesia, Micronesia and Polynesia. The magazine was headquartered and published in Honolulu, Hawaii.

Pacific Magazine was published bi-monthly from 1976 until July 2008, when it transitioned to a completely online magazine. The magazine remained the oldest continuously published regional magazine in the Pacific Islands region at the time of its suspension of publication on January 1, 2009. The magazine's readership grew to include subscribers outside of the Pacific Islands region, including Asia, Australia, Europe, North America and the Middle East.

== History ==
Pacific Magazine was founded in Honolulu, Hawaii, in 1976. The magazine was purchased by TransOceanic Media, a subsidiary of the AIO Group, from its former publisher, Bruce Jensen, in May 2000. Pacific Magazine distributed approximately 7,500 copies throughout the Northern Pacific region, and an additional 7,500 copies through a former competitor based in Fiji as of July 2001.

TransOceanic Media expanded the magazine's monthly readership to a circulation of more than 35,000 following its acquisition. TransOceanic Media also launched Pacific Magazine's web-based news service. The Pacific Magazine site took news stories from across the Pacific Islands and Asia-Pacific region. The site published stories from other Pacific news services, such as Tahitipresse and Oceania Flash, as well as from regional or national newspapers from across the Pacific.

Pacific Magazine published its last print edition to date in July 2008. The magazine's editors and staff began to focus exclusively on its web site, which included an archive of past stories and an almanac of important Pacific Island people. Giff Johnson, the magazine's foreign correspondent based in Majuro, Marshall Islands, was named the interim managing editor in 2008 to supervise Pacific Magazine's transition from print to a strictly online magazine. The Pacific Magazine web site continued to draw over 50,000 unique visitors per month in 2008.

On October 1, 2008, Fijian journalist Ulamila Kurai Wragg was appointed the new managing editor of Pacific Magazine. She replaced interim editor, Giff Johnson. Wragg, who was previously the Cook Islands correspondent for Pacific Magazine, worked as the managing editor from her home base in Rarotonga.

As part of the 2008 editorial leadership shake-up, Pacific Magazine publisher Floyd Takeuchi became the magazine's "Publisher-Editor", working in conjunction with Wragg to develop the magazine's new editorial direction. The senior management team which Wragg joined also included Florence Betham, the magazine's associate publisher who hailed from Tafuna, American Samoa.

The Great Recession continued to decrease the advertising revenue collected by Pacific Magazine.

=== Suspension of publication ===
Pacific Magazine suspended all operations on January 1, 2009, after 32 years of continuous publication, either in print or online, due to the 2008 financial crisis. Pacific Magazine's correspondents and journalists, who are based throughout the Pacific Islands region, were informed of the magazine's planned suspension in early December 2008. The suspension of operations left open the possibility that Pacific Magazine could be relaunched in the future once economic conditions improve.
