= The Marshall Islands Journal =

Marshallese newspaper (1970–)

- Masthead
- Type: Weekly newspaper
- Founder(s): Joe Murphy and Mike Malone
- Founded: 1970
- Language: English and Marshallese
- Country: Marshall Islands
- Circulation: 2,000 (as of 2018)
- Website: marshallislandsjournal.com

The Marshall Islands Journal is a bilingual weekly newspaper published in the Marshall Islands. Founded in 1970, it is the sole newspaper in the country and has a circulation of approximately 2,000 copies each week as of 2018. It is published in English and Marshallese.

== History ==
The Marshall Islands Journal was co-founded in 1970 as the Micronitor by Joe Murphy and Mike Malone, two American Peace Corps volunteers without any previous experience in journalism. Publication began in Malone's home, with the first copy released on February 13, 1970. The name changed to the Micronesian Independent and then The Marshall Islands Journal shortly afterward, and they moved into a new building, where construction had begun in 1969. Murphy became the head of the newspaper.

The newspaper benefited from the lack of competition, and its early criticism of Micronesian politicians and the American Trust Territory of the Pacific Islands gave it credibility among the Marshallese public. It has been especially critical of earlier American nuclear weapons tests in the Marshall Islands such as Castle Bravo. Murphy hired Giff Johnson as a reporter for the paper shortly after Johnson's immigration to the country in 1984. Johnson became editor-in-chief four months later.

Murphy coined the slogan "world's worst newspaper" in the 1990s as a response to what he felt were insufficient slogans of other newspapers, bringing it international attention. The Boston Globe commented on The Marshall Islands Journal in its 1994 list of worst newspapers, describing it as "first-class". Murphy rejected this praise, saying that he "must have sent [The Boston Globe] the wrong issues". The paper has covered climate change in the Marshall Islands with increasing frequency since 1992, eventually leading to weekly content on the issue. Murphy retired from the paper in 2019 as his health declined.

== Publication and circulation ==
The Marshall Islands Journal is privately owned. As of 2018, it is staffed by approximately 20 people with a 60-year-old printing press. As the Marshall Islands is isolated from much of the world, The Marshall Islands Journal must order supplies such as paper several months in advance. The paper is bilingual, with publications in both English and Marshallese.

It had a circulation of approximately 3,000 copies weekly in 2004, and 2,000 in 2018. Most copies are circulated in the capital, Majuro, while many are flown to Kwajalein each week. It has an additional online subscriber readership of a few hundred readers, including several members of the United States Department of State, which uses the paper as a major source of information on the Marshall Islands.
