= Castle Bravo =

1954 U.S. thermonuclear weapon test in the Marshall Islands

- Time-lapse of the Bravo detonation and subsequent mushroom cloud

- Location within Pacific Ocean

Information
- Country: United States
- Test series: Operation Castle
- Test site: Bikini Atoll
- Coordinates: 11°41′50″N 165°16′19″E
- Date: 1 March 1954; 72 years ago
- Test type: Atmospheric
- Yield: 15 megatons of TNT (63 PJ)

Test chronology

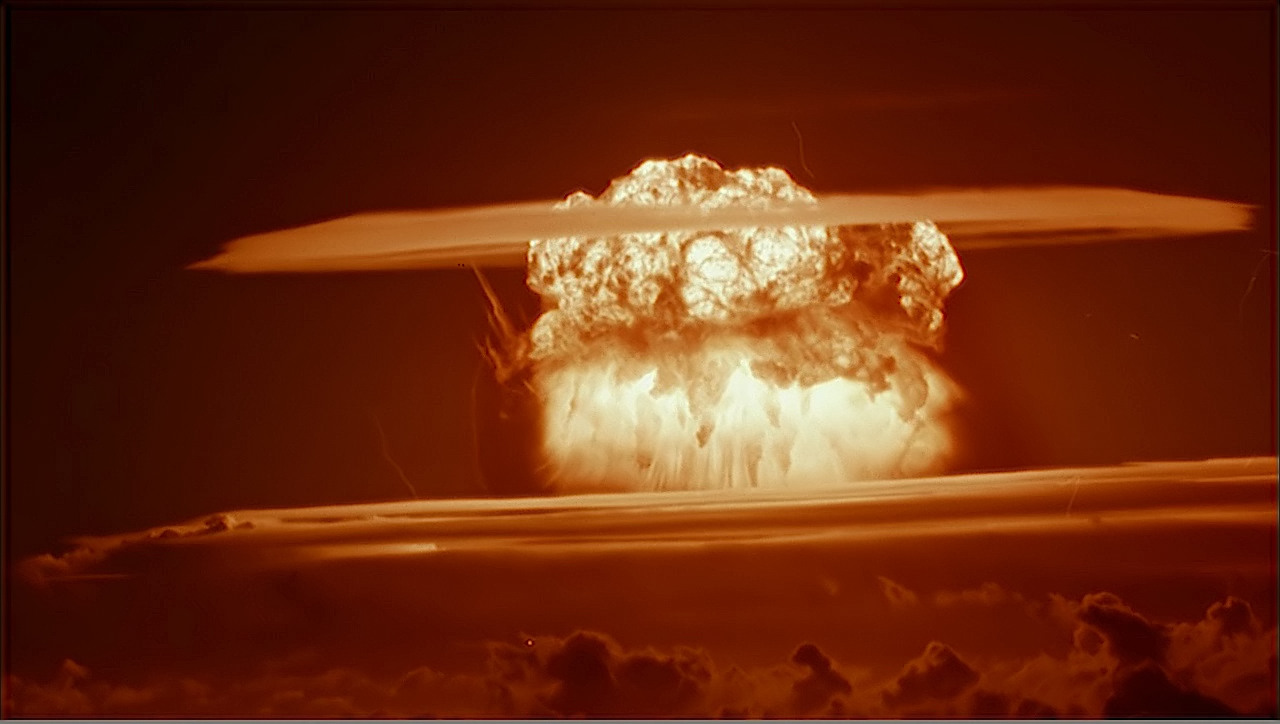
another image of the test

Castle Bravo was the first in a series of high-yield thermonuclear weapon design tests conducted by the United States at Bikini Atoll, Marshall Islands, as part of Operation Castle. Detonated on March 1, 1954, the device remains the most powerful nuclear device ever detonated by the United States and the first lithium deuteride–fueled thermonuclear weapon tested using the Teller–Ulam design. Castle Bravo's yield was 15 megatons of TNT [Mt] (63 PJ), 2.5 times the predicted 6 Mt (25 PJ), due to unforeseen additional reactions involving lithium-7, which led to radioactive contamination in the surrounding area.

Radioactive nuclear fallout, the heaviest of which was in the form of pulverized surface coral from the detonation, fell on residents of Rongelap and Utirik atolls, while the more particulate and gaseous fallout spread around the world. The inhabitants of the islands were evacuated three days later and suffered radiation sickness. Twenty-three crew members of the Japanese fishing vessel Daigo Fukuryū Maru ("Lucky Dragon No. 5") were also contaminated by the heavy fallout, experiencing acute radiation syndrome, including the death six months later of Kuboyama Aikichi, the boat's chief radioman. The blast incited a strong international reaction over atmospheric thermonuclear testing.

The Bravo Crater is located at 11°41′50″N 165°16′19″E. The remains of the Castle Bravo causeway are at 11°42′6″N 165°17′7″E.

== Bomb design ==
SHRIMP
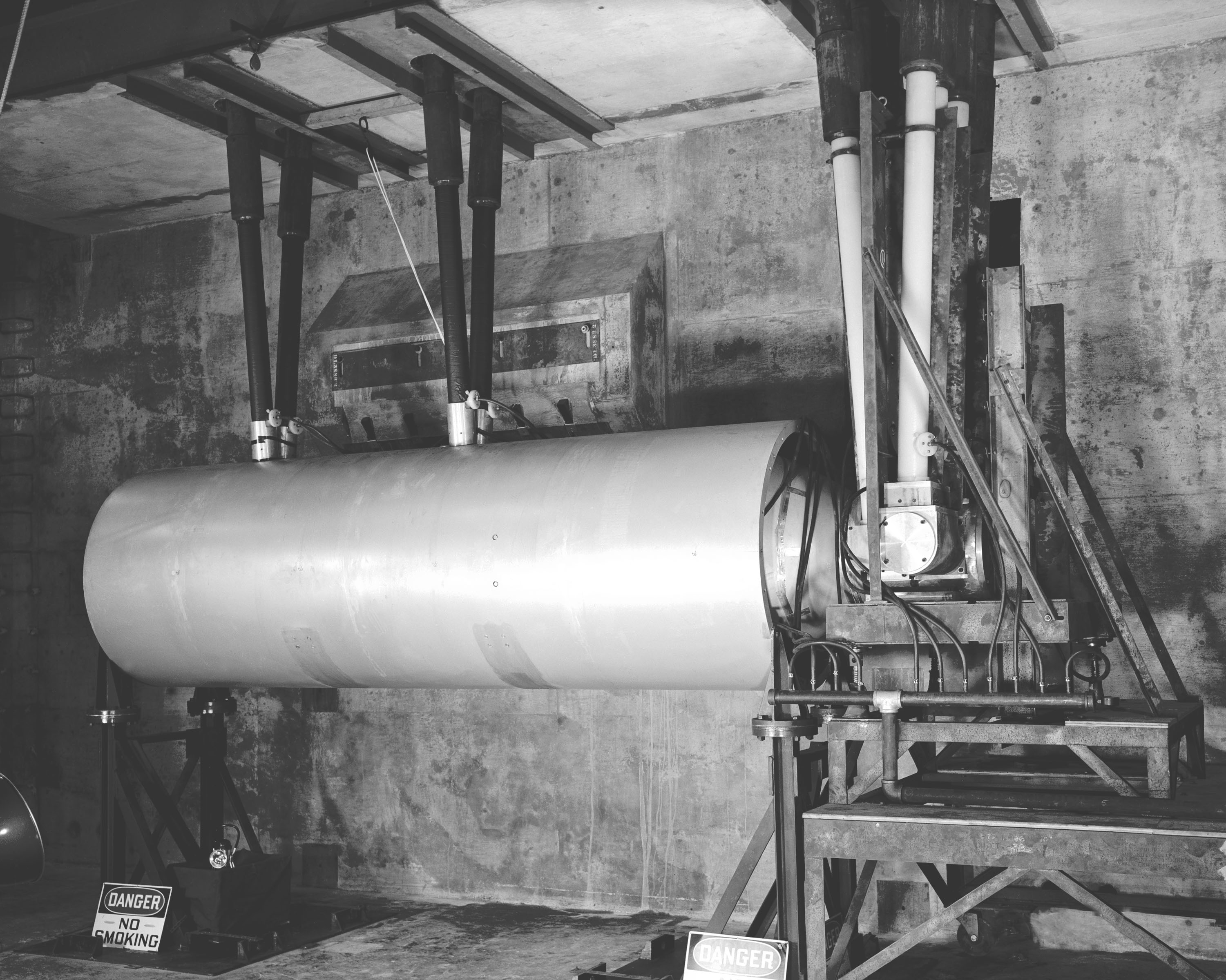
- The SHRIMP device in its shot cab
- Type: Teller–Ulam design thermonuclear weapon

Production history
- Designer: Ben Diven (project engineer)
- Designed: 24 February 1953
- Manufacturer: Los Alamos National Laboratory
- Unit cost: $2.7 million (1954) ($25.6 million in 2025 dollars)
- Produced: October 1953
- No. built: 1
- Variants: TX-21C, TX-26

Specifications
- Mass: 10,659 kg (23,499 lb)
- Length: 455.93 cm (179.50 in)
- Diameter: 136.90 cm (53.90 in)
- Filling: Lithium-6 deuteride
- Filling weight: 400 kg (880 lb)
- Blast yield: Expected: 5 megatons of TNT (21 PJ); Actual: 15 megatons of TNT (63 PJ)

=== Primary system ===
The Castle Bravo device was housed in a cylinder that weighed 23,500 pounds (10,700 kg) and measured 179.5 inches (456 cm) in length and 53.9 inches (137 cm) in diameter.

The primary device was a COBRA deuterium–tritium gas-boosted atomic bomb made by Los Alamos Scientific Laboratory, a very compact MK 7 device. This boosted fission device had been tested in the Upshot–Knothole Climax event and yielded 61 kilotons of TNT [kt] (260 TJ) (out of 50–70 kt expected yield range). It was considered successful enough that the planned operation series Domino, designed to explore the same question about a suitable primary for thermonuclear bombs, could be canceled. The implosion system was quite lightweight at 900 lb (410 kg), because it eliminated the aluminum pusher shell around the tamper (Note: In the Mark 7 HE system, the irregularities in the implosion front were relatively small rendering the pusher component unnecessary.) and used the more compact ring lenses, (Note: Ring lenses were used in conjunction with 1E23 type bridge-wire detonators. The ring lenses reduced the weapon's external diameter by making the HE layer thinner, and their simultaneity of shock wave emergence was considerably higher compared to previous hyperboloid lenses, enabling better and more accurate compression (LA-1632, table 4.1). At the same time, since the high explosive layer was thinner it was less opaque for the X-rays emitted by the pit.) a design feature shared with the Mark 5, 12, 13 and 18 designs. The explosive material of the inner charges in the MK 7 was changed to the more powerful Cyclotol 75/25, instead of the Composition B used in most stockpiled bombs at that time, as Cyclotol 75/25 was denser than Composition B and thus could generate the same amount of explosive force in a smaller volume (it provided 13 percent more compressive energy than Comp B). The composite uranium-plutonium COBRA core was levitated in a type-D pit. COBRA was Los Alamos' most recent product of design work on the "new principles" of the hollow core. A copper pit liner encased within the weapon-grade plutonium inner capsule prevented DT gas diffusion into the plutonium, a technique first tested in Greenhouse Item. The assembled module weighed 1,840 lb (830 kg), measuring 30.5 in (770 mm) across. It was located at the end of the device, which, as seen in the declassified film, shows a small cone projecting from the ballistic case. This cone is the part of the paraboloid that was used to focus the radiation emanating from the primary into the secondary.

=== Deuterium and lithium ===
The device was called SHRIMP, and had the same basic configuration (radiation implosion) as the Ivy Mike wet device, except with a different type of fusion fuel. SHRIMP used lithium deuteride (LiD), which is solid at room temperature; Ivy Mike used cryogenic liquid deuterium (D_{2}), which required elaborate cooling equipment. Castle Bravo was the first test by the United States of a practical deliverable fusion bomb, even though the TX-21 as proof-tested in the Bravo event was not weaponized. The successful test rendered obsolete the cryogenic design used by Ivy Mike and its weaponized derivative, the JUGHEAD, which was slated to be tested as the initial Castle Yankee. It also used a 3.7 in (9.5 cm)-thick 7075 aluminum ballistic case. Aluminum was used to drastically reduce the bomb's weight and simultaneously provided sufficient radiation confinement time to raise yield, a departure from the heavy stainless steel casing (304L or MIM 316L) employed by other weapon projects at the time.

The SHRIMP was at least in theory and in many critical aspects identical in geometry to the RUNT and RUNT II devices later proof-fired in the Romeo and Yankee shots. On paper it was a scaled-down version of these devices, and its origins can be traced back to 1953. The United States Air Force indicated the importance of lighter thermonuclear weapons for delivery by the B-47 Stratojet and B-58 Hustler. Los Alamos National Laboratory responded to this indication with a follow-up enriched version of the RUNT scaled down to a 3/4 scale radiation-implosion system called the SHRIMP. The proposed weight reduction from TX-17's 42,000 pounds (19,000 kg) to TX-21's 25,000 pounds (11,000 kg)) would provide the Air Force with a much more versatile deliverable gravity bomb. The final version tested in Castle used partially enriched lithium as its fusion fuel. Natural lithium is a mixture of lithium-6 and lithium-7 isotopes (with 7.5% of the former). The enriched lithium used in Bravo was nominally 40% lithium-6 (the remainder was the much more common lithium-7, which was incorrectly assumed to be inert). The fuel slugs varied in enrichment from 37 to 40% in ^{6}Li, and the slugs with lower enrichment were positioned at the end of the fusion-fuel chamber, away from the primary. The lower levels of lithium enrichment in the fuel slugs, compared with the ALARM CLOCK and many later hydrogen weapons, were due to shortages in enriched lithium at that time, as the first of the Alloy Development Plants (ADP) started production in late 1953. The volume of LiD fuel used was approximately 60% the volume of the fusion fuel filling used in the wet SAUSAGE and dry RUNT I and II devices, or about 500 liters (110 imp gal; 130 U.S. gal), (Note: Both SAUSAGE and the two RUNTs (SAUSAGE's "lithiated" versions) had fusion fuel volumes of 840 liters. SAUSAGE used an 840-liter version of a cryogenic vessel developed for the PANDA committee (PANDA was SAUSAGE's unclassified name) and in part by the National Bureau of Standards (see more information here). This vessel fits the description of Richard Rhodes in Dark Sun (p. 490) and Mike's fusion fuel volume assumed by Andre Gsponer and Jean-Pierre Hurni in their paper "The physical principles of thermonuclear explosives, inertial confinement fusion, and the quest for fourth generation nuclear weapons", p. 68.) corresponding to about 390 kg of lithium deuteride (as LiD has a density of 0.78201 g/cm^{3}). The mixture cost about 4.54 USD/g at that time. The fusion burn efficiency was close to 25.1%, the highest attained efficiency of the first thermonuclear weapon generation. This efficiency is well within the figures given in a November 1956 statement, when a DOD official disclosed that thermonuclear devices with efficiencies ranging from 15% to up about 40% had been tested. Hans Bethe reportedly stated independently that the first generation of thermonuclear weapons had (fusion) efficiencies varying from as low as 15% to up about 25%.

The thermonuclear burn would produce (like the fission fuel in the primary) pulsations (generations) of high-energy neutrons with an average temperature of 14 MeV through Jetter's cycle.

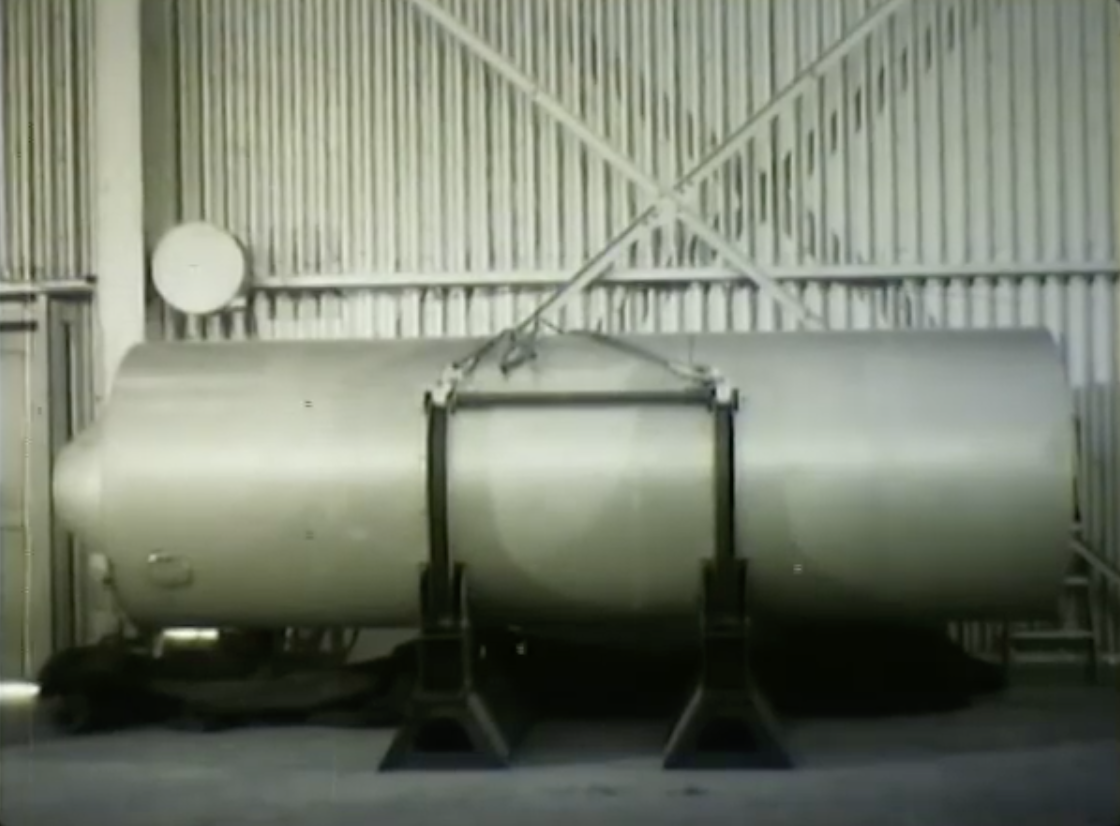
The SHRIMP shortly before installation in its shot cab

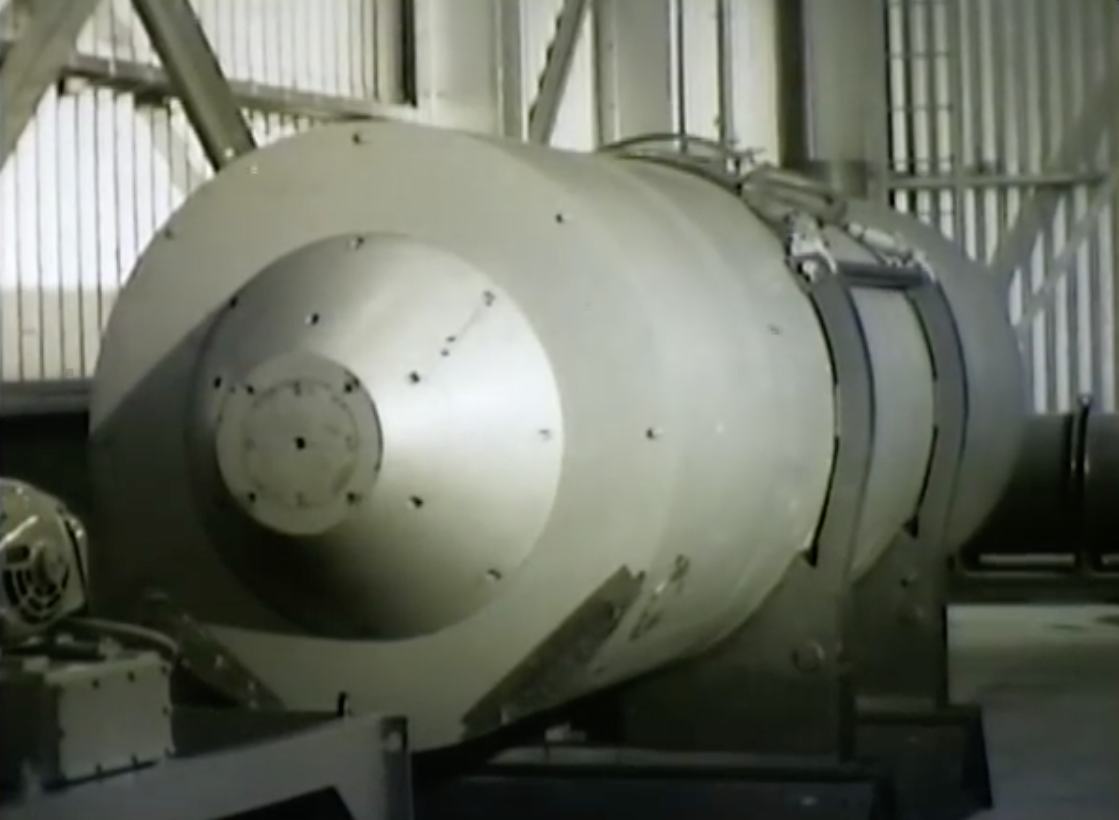
SHRIMP's parabolic projection

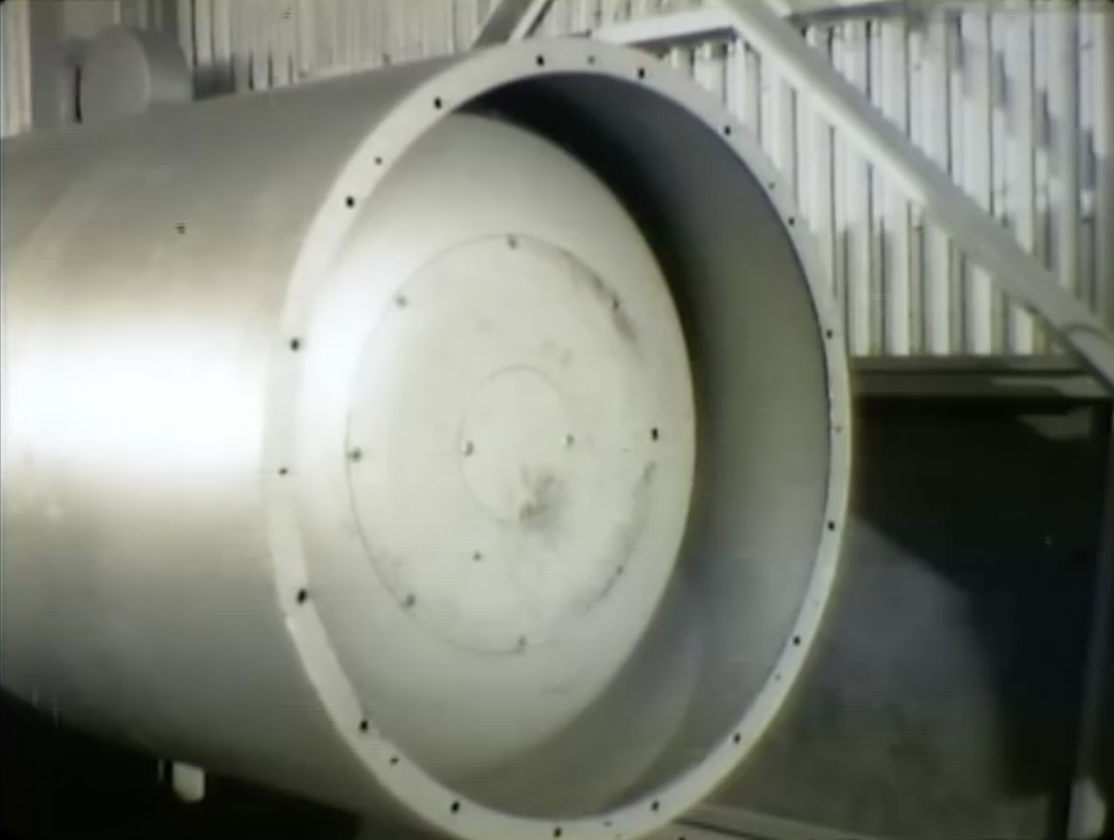
SHRIMP's cylindrical end

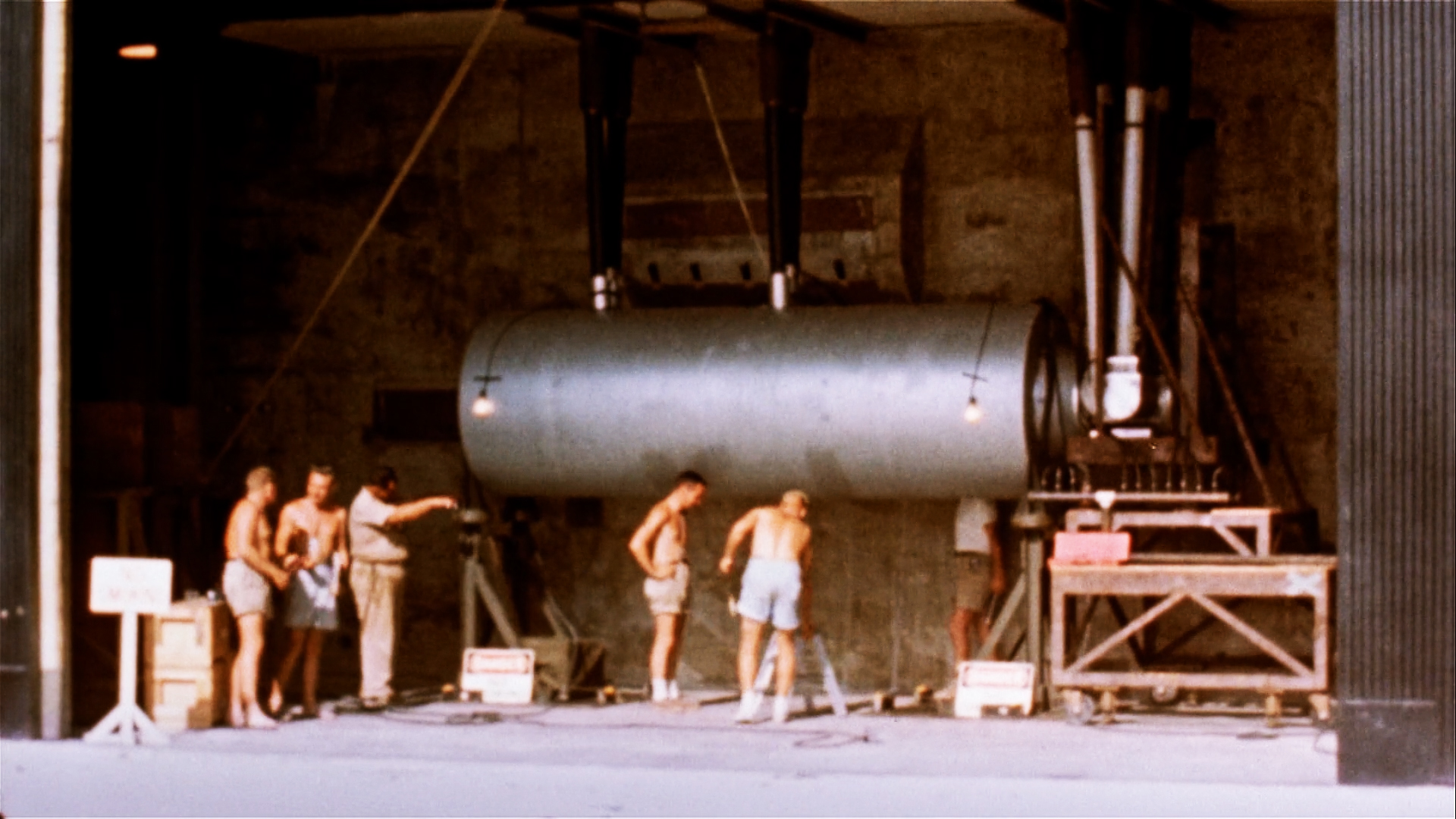
Shot-cab installation of SHRIMP device, with humans for scale

==== Jetter's cycle ====

The Jetter cycle is a combination of reactions involving lithium, deuterium, and tritium. It consumes lithium-6 and deuterium, and in two reactions (with energies of 17.6 MeV and 4.8 MeV, mediated by a neutron and tritium) it produces two alpha particles.

The reaction would produce high-energy neutrons with 14 MeV, and its neutronicity was estimated at ≈0.885 (for a Lawson criterion of ≈1.5).

==== Possible additional tritium for high-yield ====
As SHRIMP, along with the RUNT I and ALARM CLOCK, were to be high-yield shots required to assure the thermonuclear "emergency capability", their fusion fuel may have been spiked with additional tritium, in the form of ^{6}LiT. In this context, "emergency capability" was understood as to mean that the system would require trained scientists and engineers to use, and would "thus be in a state corresponding to the Little Boy and Fat Man bombs at their time of use in World War II." All of the high-energy 14 MeV neutrons would cause fission in the uranium fusion tamper wrapped around the secondary and the spark plug's plutonium rod. The ratio of deuterium (and tritium) atoms burned by 14 MeV neutrons spawned by the burning was expected to vary from 5:1 to 3:1, a standardization derived from Mike, while for these estimations, the ratio of 3:1 was predominantly used in ISRINEX. The neutronicity of the fusion reactions harnessed by the fusion tamper would dramatically increase the yield of the device.

=== SHRIMP's indirect drive ===
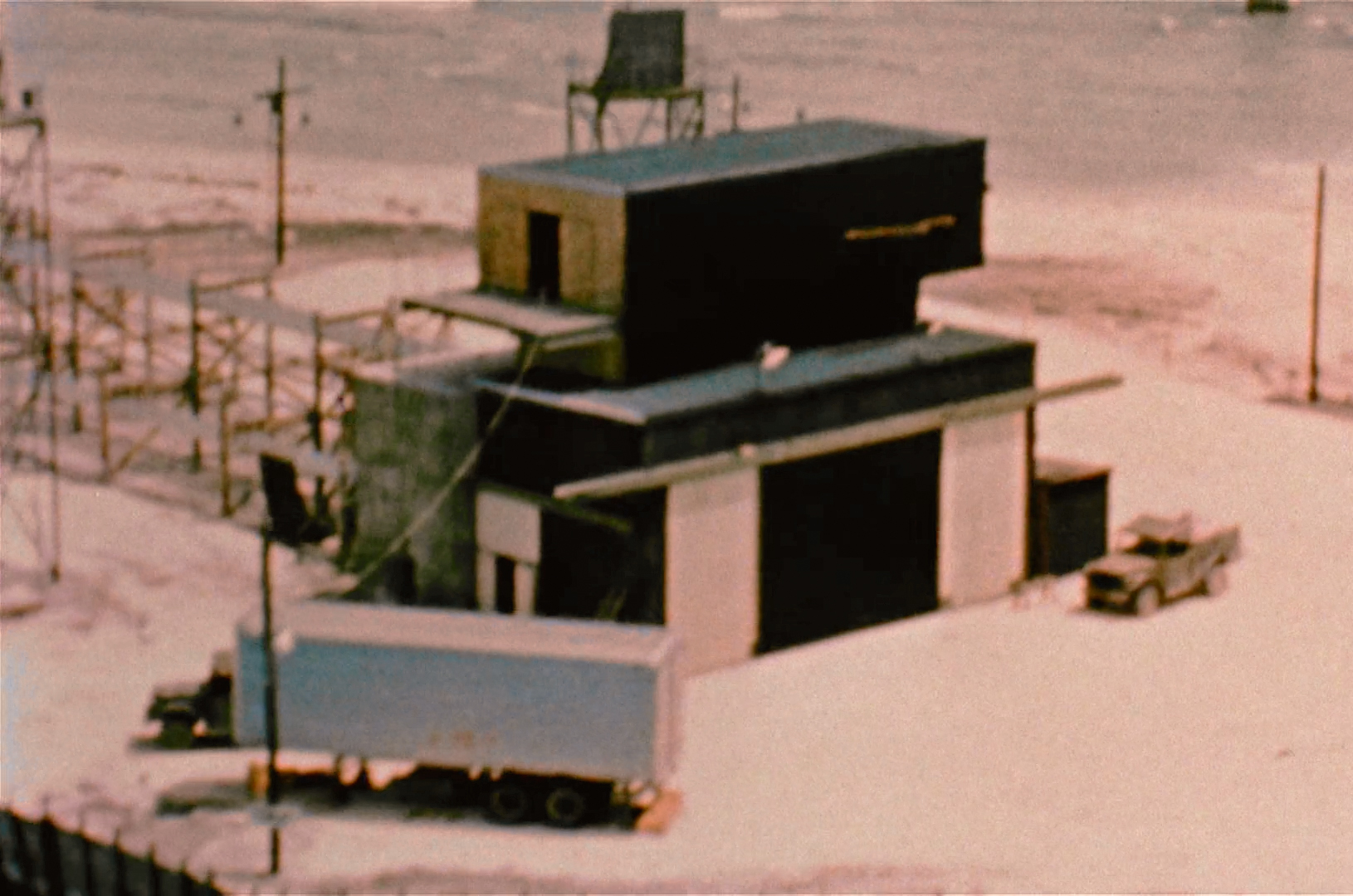
Bravo SHRIMP device shot-cab

Attached to the cylindrical ballistic case was a natural-uranium liner, the radiation case, that was about 2.5 cm thick. Its internal surface was lined with about 240 μm-thick copper foil to increase the overall albedo of the hohlraum. Copper possesses excellent reflecting properties, and its low cost, compared to other reflecting materials like gold, made it useful for mass-produced hydrogen weapons. Hohlraum albedo is a very important design parameter for any inertial-confinement configuration. A relatively high albedo permits higher interstage coupling due to the more favorable azimuthal and latitudinal angles of reflected radiation. The limiting value of the albedo for high-Z materials is reached when the thickness is 5–10 g/cm^{2}, or 0.5–1.0 free paths. Thus, a hohlraum made of uranium much thicker than a free path of uranium would be needlessly heavy and costly. At the same time, the angular anisotropy increases as the atomic number of the scatterer material is reduced. Therefore, hohlraum liners require the use of copper (or, as in other devices, gold or aluminium), as the absorption probability increases with the value of Z_{eff} of the scatterer. There are two sources of X-rays in the hohlraum: the primary's irradiance, which is dominant at the beginning and during the pulse rise; and the wall, which is important during the required radiation temperature's (T_{r}) plateau. The primary emits radiation in a manner similar to a flash bulb, and the secondary needs constant T_{r} to properly implode. This constant wall temperature is dictated by the ablation pressure requirements to drive compression, which lie on average at about 0.4 keV (out of a range of 0.2 to 2 keV) (Note: This temperature range is compatible with a hohlraum filling made of a low-Z material because the fission bomb's tamper, pusher and high-explosive lenses as well as interstage's plastic foam strongly attenuate the radiation emitted by the core. Thus, X-rays deposited into the hohlraum liner from primary's interface with the interstage (i.e. the primary's outer surface) were "cooler" than the maximum temperature of a fission device.), corresponding to several million kelvins. Wall temperature depended on the temperature of the primary's core which peaked at about 5.4 keV during boosted-fission. The final wall-temperature, which corresponds to energy of the wall-reradiated X-rays to the secondary's pusher, also drops due to losses from the hohlraum material itself. (Note: These losses were associated with material's properties like back-scattering, quantum tunneling, exitance etc.) Natural uranium nails, lined to the top of their head with copper, attached the radiation case to the ballistic case. The nails were bolted in vertical arrays in a double-shear configuration to better distribute the shear loads. This method of attaching the radiation case to the ballistic case was first used successfully in the Ivy Mike device. The radiation case had a parabolic end, which housed the COBRA primary that was employed to create the conditions needed to start the fusion reaction, and its other end was a cylinder, as also seen in Bravo's declassified film.

The space between the uranium fusion tamper, (Note: Tamper is the metal cladding encasing the secondary, and it is also termed pusher; both terms can be used interchangeably) and the case formed a radiation channel to conduct X-rays from the primary to the secondary assembly; the interstage. It is one of the most closely guarded secrets of a multistage thermonuclear weapon. Implosion of the secondary assembly is indirectly driven, and the techniques used in the interstage to smooth the spatial profile (i.e. reduce coherence and nonuniformities) of the primary's irradiance are of utmost importance. This was done with the introduction of the channel filler—an optical element used as a refractive medium, also encountered as random-phase plate in the ICF laser assemblies. This medium was a polystyrene plastic foam filling, extruded or impregnated with a low-molecular-weight hydrocarbon (possibly methane gas), which turned to a low-Z plasma from the X-rays, and along with channeling radiation it modulated the ablation front on the high-Z surfaces; it "tamped" (Note: Not to be confused with the function of the fusion tamper) the sputtering effect that would otherwise "choke" radiation from compressing the secondary. (Note: Sputtering is the manifestation of the underdense plasma corona of the ablating hohlraum and the tamper surfaces. It is a problem also shared with fusion reactors such as tokamaks, that has to do with the ablated heavy particles; For a hydrogen weapon, these particles are blown-off high-Z granular particles (made of uranium or Pb–Bi eutectic; the selected material depends on the "cocktail", or high-Z element mixture, of the hohlraum design to tailor its opacity), which fly inside the radiation channel and absorb radiation or reflect it, hampering radiation "ducting".) The reemitted X-rays from the radiation case must be deposited uniformly on the outer walls of the secondary's tamper and ablate it externally, driving the thermonuclear fuel capsule (increasing the density and temperature of the fusion fuel) to the point needed to sustain a thermonuclear reaction. (see Nuclear weapon design). This point is above the threshold where the fusion fuel would turn opaque to its emitting radiation, as determined from its Rosseland opacity, meaning that the generated energy balances the energy lost to fuel's vicinity (as radiation, particle losses). After all, for any hydrogen weapon system to work, this energy equilibrium must be maintained through the compression equilibrium between the fusion tamper and the spark plug, hence their name equilibrium supers.

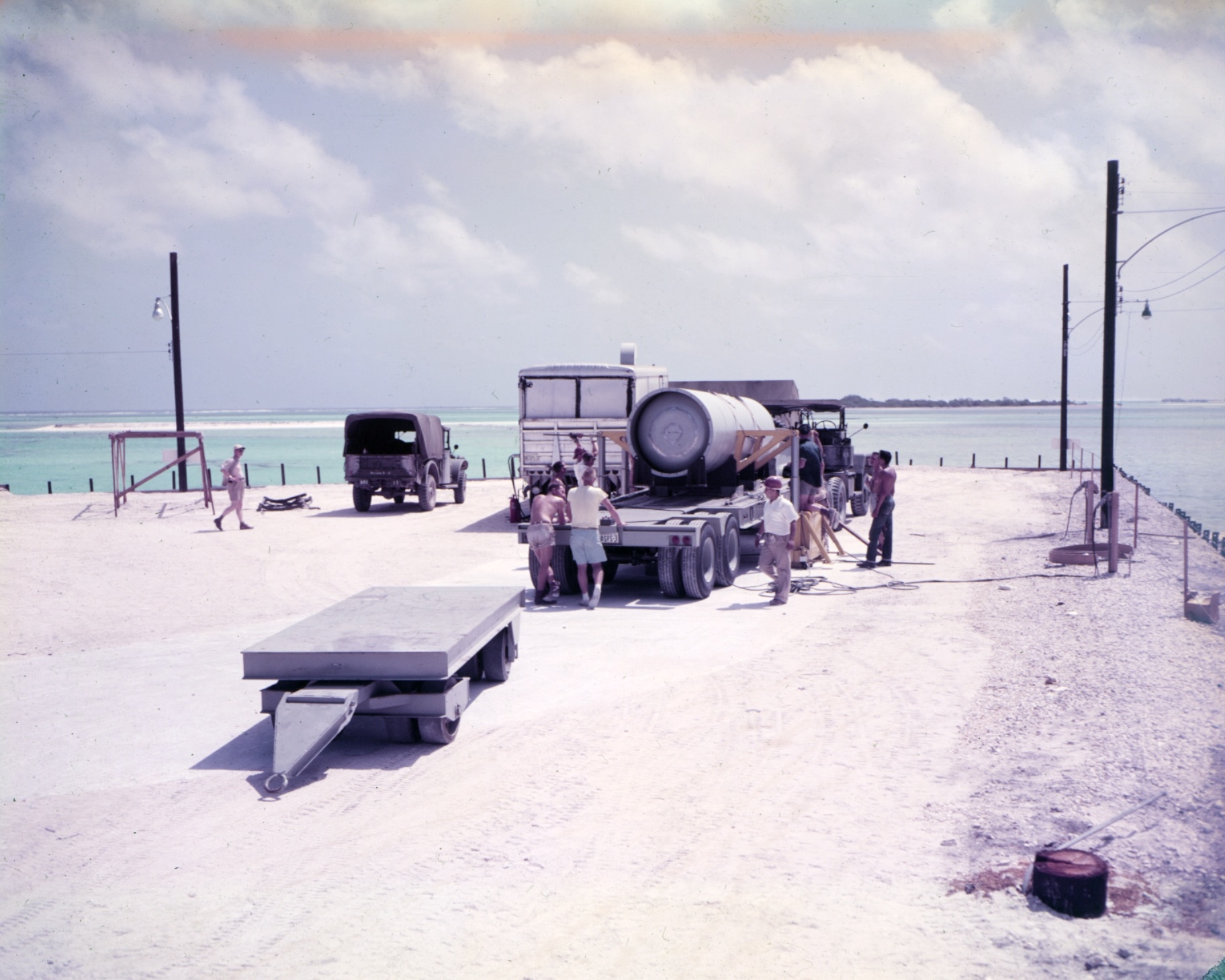
SHRIMP device delivered via truck awaiting installation

Since the ablative process takes place on both walls of the radiation channel, a numerical estimate made with ISRINEX (a thermonuclear explosion simulation program) suggested that the uranium tamper also had a thickness of 2.5 cm, so that an equal pressure would be applied to both walls of the hohlraum. The rocket effect on the surface of tamper's wall created by the ablation of its several superficial layers would force an equal mass of uranium that rested in the remainder of the tamper to speed inwards, thus imploding the thermonuclear core. At the same time, the rocket effect on the surface of the hohlraum would force the radiation case to speed outwards. The ballistic case would confine the exploding radiation case for as long as necessary. The fact that the tamper material was uranium enriched in ^{235}U is primarily based on the final fission reaction fragments detected in the radiochemical analysis, which conclusively showed the presence of ^{237}U, found by the Japanese in the shot debris. The first-generation thermonuclear weapons (MK-14, 16, 17, 21, 22 and 24) all used uranium tampers enriched to 37.5% ^{235}U. The exception to this was the MK-15 ZOMBIE that used a 93.5% enriched fission jacket.

=== The secondary assembly ===
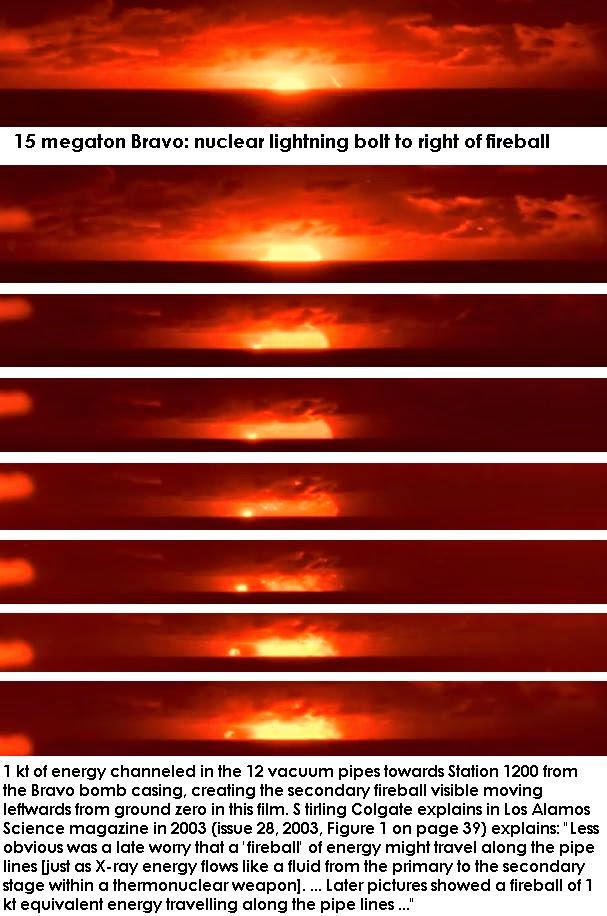
In a similar manner to the earlier pipes filled with a partial pressure of helium, as used in the Ivy Mike test of 1952, the 1954 Castle Bravo test was likewise heavily instrumented with Line-of-Sight (LOS) pipes, to better define and quantify the timing and energies of the x-rays and neutrons produced by these early thermonuclear devices. One of the outcomes of this diagnostic work resulted in this graphic depiction of the transport of energetic x-ray and neutrons through a vacuum line, some 2.3 km long, whereupon it heated solid matter at the "station 1200" blockhouse and thus generated a secondary fireball.

The secondary assembly was the actual SHRIMP component of the weapon. The weapon, like most contemporary thermonuclear weapons at that time, bore the same codename as the secondary component. The secondary was situated in the cylindrical end of the device, where its end was locked to the radiation case by a type of mortise and tenon joint. The hohlraum at its cylindrical end had an internal projection, which nested the secondary and had better structural strength to support the secondary's assembly, which had most of the device's mass. A visualization to this is that the joint looked much like a cap (the secondary) fitted in a cone (the projection of the radiation case). Any other major supporting structure would produce interference with radiation transfer from the primary to the secondary and complex vibrational behavior. With this form of joint bearing most of the structural loads of the secondary, the latter and the hohlraum-ballistic case ensemble behaved as a single mass sharing common eigenmodes. To reduce excessive loading of the joint, especially during deployment of the weapon, the forward section of the secondary (i.e. the thermal blast/heat shield) was anchored to the radiation case by a set of thin wires, which also aligned the center line of the secondary with the primary, as they diminished bending and torsional loads on the secondary, another technique adopted from the SAUSAGE. The secondary assembly was an elongated truncated cone. From its front part (excluding the blast-heat shield) to its aft section it was steeply tapered. Tapering was used for two reasons. First, radiation drops by the square of the distance, hence radiation coupling is relatively poor in the aftermost sections of the secondary. This made the use of a higher mass of fusion fuel in the rear end of the secondary assembly ineffective and the overall design wasteful. This was also the reason why the lower-enriched slugs of fusion fuel were placed far aft of the fuel capsule. Second, as the primary could not illuminate the whole surface of the hohlraum, in part due to the large axial length of the secondary, relatively small solid angles would be effective to compress the secondary, leading to poor radiation focusing. By tapering the secondary, the hohlraum could be shaped as a cylinder in its aft section obviating the need to machine the radiation case to a parabola at both ends. This optimized radiation focusing and enabled a streamlined production line, as it was cheaper, faster and easier to manufacture a radiation case with only one parabolic end. The tapering in this design was much steeper than its cousins, the RUNT, and the ALARM CLOCK devices. SHRIMP's tapering and its mounting to the hohlraum apparently made the whole secondary assembly resemble the body of a shrimp. The secondary's length is defined by the two pairs of dark-colored diagnostic hot spot pipes attached to the middle and left section of the device. (Note: Both the ballistic case and hohlraum were perforated in these points so that light emanating from the nuclear components could travel unobstructed to the recording station. A slight drop in yield was expected because of those apertures, much like in the Mike test. The hot-spot openings, similar to the "starburst" diagnostics in hohlraums used in inertial confinement fusion (ICF) indirect drive experiments, caused local radiation decoupling and hence poor radiation reflection by the hohlraum. Radiation decoupling in turn reduced locally the efficiency of the ablation process on the surface of secondary's tamper, destabilizing implosion by a small degree. Nevertheless, even minor instabilities during ablation amplified the already dreaded Taylor mixing.) These pipe sections were 8 5/8 inches (220 mm) in diameter and 40 feet (12 m) long and were butt-welded end-to-end to the ballistic case leading out to the top of the shot cab. They would carry the initial reaction's light up to the array of 12 mirror towers built in an arc on the artificial 1-acre (0.40 ha) shot island created for the event. From those pipes, mirrors would reflect early bomb light from the bomb casing to a series of remote high-speed cameras, and so that Los Alamos could determine both the simultaneity of the design (i.e. the time interval between primary's firing and secondary's ignition) and the thermonuclear burn rate in these two crucial areas of the secondary device.

This secondary assembly device contained the lithium deuteride fusion fuel in a stainless-steel canister. Running down to the center of the secondary was a 1.3 cm thick hollow cylindrical rod of plutonium, nested in the steel canister. This was the spark plug, a tritium-boosted fission device. It was made from plutonium rings and had a hollow volume inside that measured about 0.5 cm in diameter. This central volume was lined with copper, which like the liner in the primary's fissile core prevented DT gas diffusion in plutonium. The spark plug's boosting charge contained about 4 grams of tritium and, imploding together with the secondary's compression, was timed to detonate by the first generations of neutrons that arrived from the primary. Timing was defined by the geometric characteristics of the sparkplug (its uncompressed annular radius), which detonated when its criticality, or k_{eff}, transcended 1. Its purpose was to compress the fusion material around it from its inside, equally applying pressure with the tamper. The compression factor of the fusion fuel and its adiabatic compression energy determined the minimal energy required for the spark plug to counteract the compression of the fusion fuel and the tamper's momentum. The spark plug weighed about 18 kg, and its initial firing yielded 0.6 kilotonnes of TNT (2.5 TJ). Then it would be completely fissioned by the fusion neutrons, contributing about 330 kilotonnes of TNT (1,400 TJ) to the total yield. The energy required by the spark plug to counteract the compression of the fusion fuel was lower than the primary's yield because coupling of the primary's energy in the hohlraum is accompanied by losses due to the difference between the X-ray fireball and the hohlraum temperatures. The neutrons entered the assembly by a small hole (Note: The cylindrical hole was plugged with ^{10}B-doped paraffin wax to time the neutrons' arrival.) through the ≈28 cm thick ^{238}U blast-heat shield. It was positioned in front of the secondary assembly facing the primary. Similar to the tamper-fusion capsule assembly, the shield was shaped as a circular frustum, with its small diameter facing the primary's side, and with its large diameter locked by a type of mortise and tenon joint to the rest of the secondary assembly. The shield-tamper ensemble can be visualized as a circular bifrustum. All parts of the tamper were similarly locked together to provide structural support and rigidity to the secondary assembly. Surrounding the fusion-fuel–spark-plug assembly was the uranium tamper with a standoff air-gap about 0.9 cm wide that was to increase the tamper's momentum, a levitation technique used as early as Operation Sandstone and described by physicist Ted Taylor as hammer-on-the-nail-impact. Since there were also technical concerns that high-Z tamper material would mix rapidly with the relatively low-density fusion fuel—leading to unacceptably large radiation losses—the stand-off gap also acted as a buffer to mitigate the unavoidable and undesirable Taylor mixing.

=== Use of boron ===
Boron was used at many locations in this dry system; it has a high cross-section for the absorption of slow neutrons, which fission ^{235}U and ^{239}Pu, but a low cross-section for the absorption of fast neutrons, which fission ^{238}U. Because of this characteristic, ^{10}B deposited onto the surface of the secondary stage would prevent pre-detonation of the spark plug by stray neutrons from the primary without interfering with the subsequent fissioning of the ^{238}U of the fusion tamper wrapping the secondary. Boron also played a role in increasing the compressive plasma pressure around the secondary by blocking the sputtering effect, leading to higher thermonuclear efficiency. Because the structural foam holding the secondary in place within the casing was doped with ^{10}B, the secondary was compressed more highly, at a cost of some radiated neutrons. By contrast, the Castle Koon MORGENSTERN device did not use ^{10}B in its design; as a result, the intense neutron flux from its RACER IV primary predetonated the spherical fission spark plug, which in turn "cooked" the fusion fuel, leading to an overall poor compression. The plastic's low molecular weight is unable to implode the secondary's mass. Its plasma-pressure is confined in the boiled-off sections of the tamper and the radiation case so that material from neither of these two walls can enter the radiation channel that has to be open for the radiation transit.

== Detonation ==
The device was mounted in a "shot cab" on an artificial island built on a reef off Namu Island, in Bikini Atoll. A sizable array of diagnostic instruments were trained on it, including high-speed cameras trained through an arc of mirror towers around the shot cab.

The detonation took place at 06:45 on 1 March 1954, local time (18:45 on 28 February GMT).

When Bravo was detonated, within one second it formed a fireball almost 4.5 miles (7.2 km) across. This fireball was visible on Kwajalein Atoll over 250 miles (400 km) away. The explosion left a crater 6,500 feet (2,000 m) in diameter and 250 feet (76 m) in depth. The mushroom cloud reached a height of 47,000 feet (14,000 m) and a diameter of 7 miles (11 km) in about a minute, a height of 130,000 feet (40 km) and 62 mi (100 km) in diameter in less than 10 minutes and was expanding at more than 160 meters per second (580 km/h; 360 mph). As a result of the blast, the cloud contaminated more than 7,000 square miles (18,000 km^{2}) of the surrounding Pacific Ocean, including some of the surrounding small islands like Rongerik, Rongelap, and Utirik.

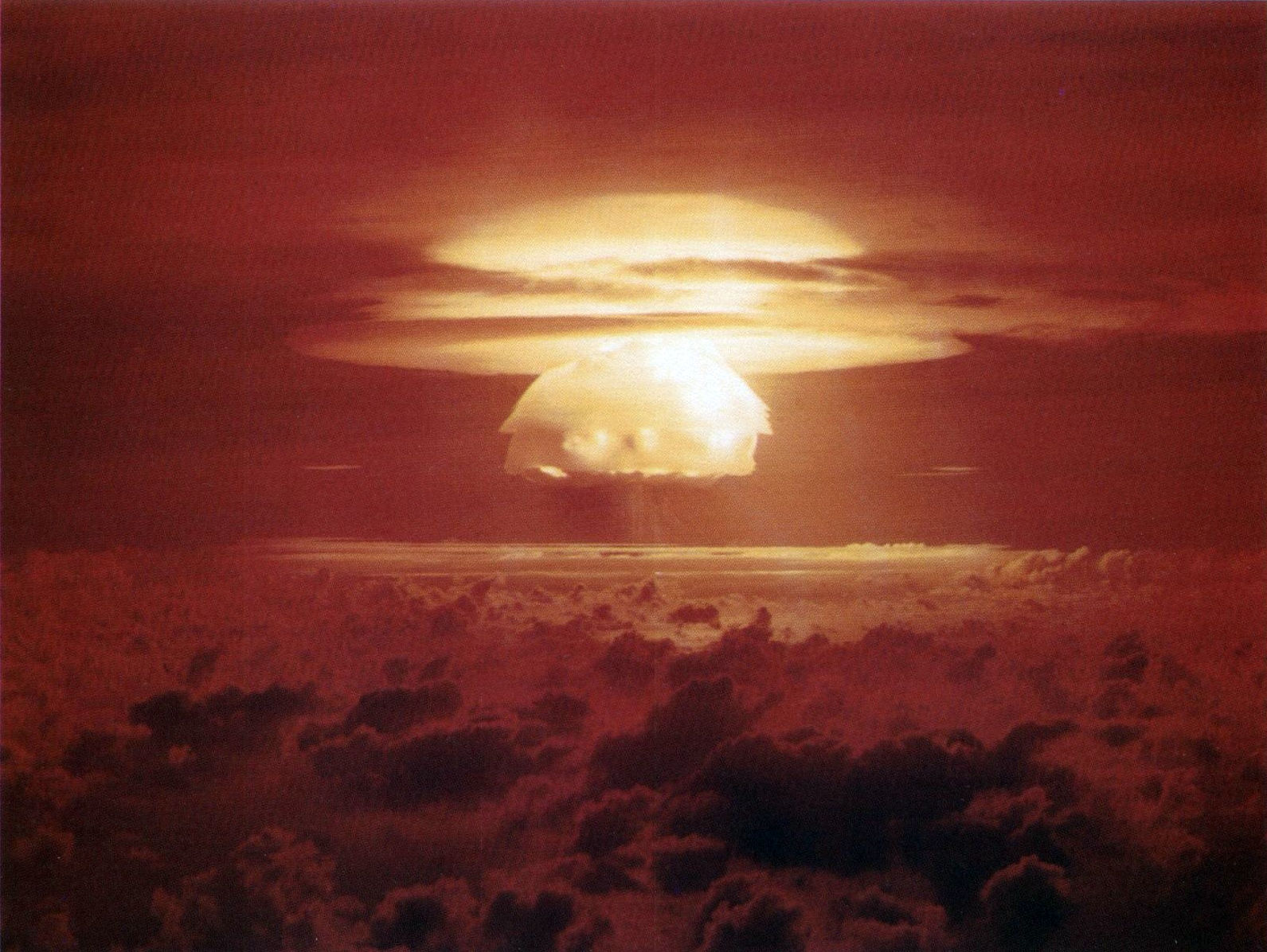
Castle Bravo mushroom cloud a few seconds after detonation

In terms of energy released (usually measured in TNT equivalence), Castle Bravo was about 1,000 times more powerful than the atomic bomb that was dropped on Hiroshima during World War II. Castle Bravo is the sixth largest nuclear explosion in history, exceeded by the Soviet tests of Tsar Bomba at approximately 50 Mt, Test 219 at 24.2 Mt, and three other (Test 147, Test 173 and Test 174) ≈20 Mt Soviet tests in 1962 at Novaya Zemlya.

=== High yield ===
Diagram of Tritium bonus provided by Lithium-7 isotope

The yield of 15 (± 5) Mt was triple that of the 5 Mt predicted by its designers. The cause of the higher yield was an error made by designers of the device at Los Alamos National Laboratory. They considered only the lithium-6 isotope in the lithium deuteride secondary to be reactive; the lithium-7 isotope, accounting for 60% of the lithium content, was assumed to participate in reactions that were too slow to contribute to the yield. It was correctly expected that the lithium-6 isotope would absorb a neutron from the fissioning plutonium and emit an alpha particle and tritium in the process, of which the latter would then fuse with the deuterium and increase the yield in a predicted manner.

It was assumed that the lithium-7 would absorb one neutron, producing lithium-8, which decays (through beta decay into beryllium-8) to a pair of alpha particles on a timescale of nearly a second, vastly longer than the timescale of nuclear detonation. However, when lithium-7 is bombarded with energetic neutrons with an energy greater than 2.47 MeV, rather than simply absorbing a neutron, it undergoes nuclear fission into an alpha particle, a tritium nucleus, and another neutron. As a result, much more tritium was produced than expected, the extra tritium fusing with deuterium and producing an extra neutron. The extra neutron produced by fusion and the extra neutron released directly by lithium-7 decay produced a much larger neutron flux. The result was greatly increased fissioning of the uranium tamper and increased yield.

Summarizing, the reactions involving lithium-6 result in some combination of the two following net reactions:

^{1}n + ^{6}Li → ^{3}H + ^{4}He + 4.783 MeV
^{6}Li + ^{2}H → 2 ^{4}He + 22.373 MeV

But when lithium-7 is present, one also has some amounts of the following two net reactions:

^{7}Li + ^{1}n → ^{3}H + ^{4}He + ^{1}n
^{7}Li + ^{2}H → 2 ^{4}He + ^{1}n + 15.123 MeV

This resultant extra fuel (both lithium-6 and lithium-7) contributed greatly to the fusion reactions and neutron production and in this manner greatly increased the device's explosive output. The test used lithium with a high percentage of lithium-7 only because lithium-6 was then scarce and expensive; the later Castle Union test used almost pure lithium-6. Had sufficient lithium-6 been available, the usability of the common lithium-7 might not have been discovered.

The unexpectedly high yield of the device severely damaged many of the permanent buildings on the control site island on the far side of the atoll. Little of the desired diagnostic data on the shot was collected; many instruments designed to transmit their data back before being destroyed by the blast were instead vaporized instantly, while most of the instruments that were expected to be recovered for data retrieval were destroyed by the blast.

In an additional unexpected event, albeit one of far less consequence, X-rays traveling through line-of-sight (LOS) pipes caused a small second fireball at Station 1200 with a yield of 1 kiloton of TNT (4.2 TJ).

Modern simulations at Los Alamos in 2024 using contemporary codes bring the excessive lithium-7 reactivity explanation for the unexpectedly high yield into question. The Los Alamos paper claims, "Indeed, our modern calculations show that ^{7}Li reactions did not contribute very significantly to the yield of Bravo. It is the case that the computational treatment of neutron reactions on ^{7}Li were very crude in the early 1950s, but that does not imply that this led to a large yield underprediction by a factor of 2."

== High levels of fallout ==
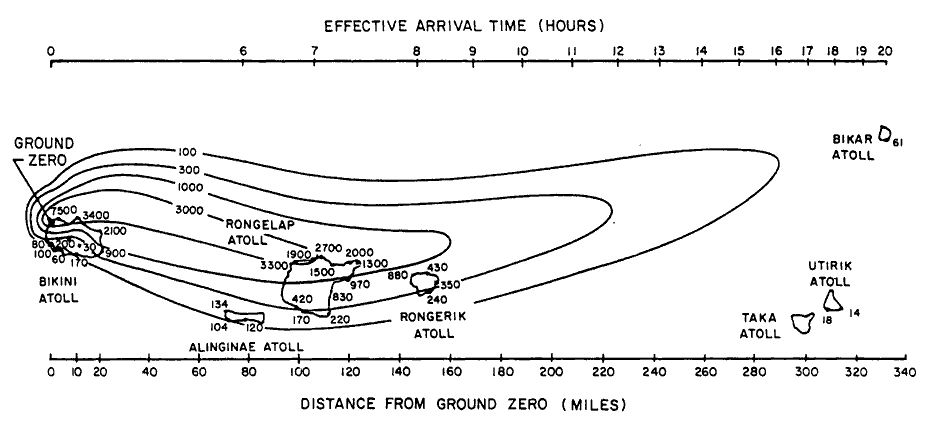
The Bravo fallout plume spread dangerous levels of radioactivity over an area over 280 miles (450 km) long, including inhabited islands. The contour lines show the cumulative radiation exposure in roentgens (R) for the first 96 hours after the test. Although widely published, this fallout map is not perfectly correct

The fission reactions of the natural uranium tamper were quite dirty, producing a large amount of fallout. That, combined with the larger than expected yield and a major wind shift, produced some very serious consequences for those in the fallout range. In the declassified film Operation Castle, the task force commander Major General Percy Clarkson pointed to a diagram indicating that the wind shift was still in the range of "acceptable fallout", although just barely.

The decision to carry out the Bravo test under the prevailing winds was made by Dr. Alvin C. Graves, the Scientific Director of Operation Castle. Graves had total authority over detonating the weapon, above that of the military commander of Operation Castle. Graves appears in the widely available film of the earlier 1952 test "Ivy Mike", which examines the last-minute fallout decisions. The narrator, the western actor Reed Hadley, is filmed aboard the control ship in that film, showing the final conference. Hadley points out that 20,000 people live in the potential area of the fallout. He asks the control panel scientist if the test can be aborted and is told "yes", but it would ruin all their preparations in setting up timed measuring instruments. In Mike, the fallout correctly landed north of the inhabited area but, in the 1954 Bravo test, there was a large amount of wind shear, and the wind that was blowing north the day before the test steadily veered towards the east.

=== Inhabited islands affected ===
Radioactive fallout was spread eastward onto the inhabited Rongelap and Rongerik atolls, which were evacuated 48 hours after the detonation. In 1957, the Atomic Energy Commission deemed Rongelap safe to return, and allowed 82 inhabitants to move back to the island. Upon their return, they discovered that their previous staple foods, including arrowroot, makmok, and fish, had either disappeared or gave residents various illnesses, and they were again removed. Ultimately, 15 islands and atolls were contaminated, and by 1963 Marshall Islands natives began to suffer from thyroid tumors, including 20 of 29 Rongelap children at the time of Bravo, and many birth defects were reported. The islanders received compensation from the U.S. government, relative to how much contamination they received, beginning in 1956; by 1995 the Nuclear Claims Tribunal reported that it had awarded $43.2 million, nearly its entire fund, to 1,196 claimants for 1,311 illnesses. A medical study, named Project 4.1, studied the effects of the fallout on the islanders.

Map showing points (X) where contaminated fish were caught or where the sea was found to be excessively radioactive. B=original "danger zone" around Bikini announced by the U.S. government. W="danger zone" extended later. xF=position of the Lucky Dragon fishing boat. NE, EC, and SE are equatorial currents.

Although the atmospheric fallout plume drifted eastward, once fallout landed in the water it was carried in several directions by ocean currents, including northwest and southwest.

=== Fishing boats ===
A Japanese fishing boat, Daigo Fukuryū Maru (Lucky Dragon No. 5), came in direct contact with the fallout, which caused many of the crew to grow ill due to radiation sickness. One member died of a secondary infection six months later after acute radiation exposure, and another had a child that was stillborn and deformed. This resulted in an international incident and reignited Japanese concerns about radiation, especially as Japanese citizens were once more adversely affected by US nuclear weapons. The official US position had been that the growth in the strength of atomic bombs was not accompanied by an equivalent growth in radioactivity released, and they denied that the crew was affected by radioactive fallout, despite data from the Japanese fishing vessel and other international sources showing the contrary.

Sir Joseph Rotblat, working at St Bartholomew's Hospital, London, demonstrated that the contamination caused by the fallout from the test was far greater than that stated officially. Rotblat deduced that the bomb had three stages and showed that the fission phase at the end of the explosion increased the amount of radioactivity a thousand-fold. Rotblat's paper was taken up by the media, and the outcry in Japan reached such a level that diplomatic relations became strained and the incident was even dubbed by some as a "second Hiroshima". Nevertheless, the Japanese and US governments quickly reached a political settlement, with the transfer to Japan of $15.3 million as compensation, with the surviving victims receiving about ¥2 million each ($5,550 in 1954, or about $66,500 in 2025). It was also agreed that the victims would not be given Hibakusha status.

In 2016, 45 Japanese fishermen from other ships sued their government for not disclosing records about their exposure to Operation Castle fallout. Records released in 2014 acknowledge that the crews of 10 ships were exposed but under health-damaging levels. In 2018 the suit was rejected by the Kochi District Court, who acknowledged the fishermen's radiation exposure but could not "conclude that the state persistently gave up providing support and conducting health surveys to hide the radiation exposure".

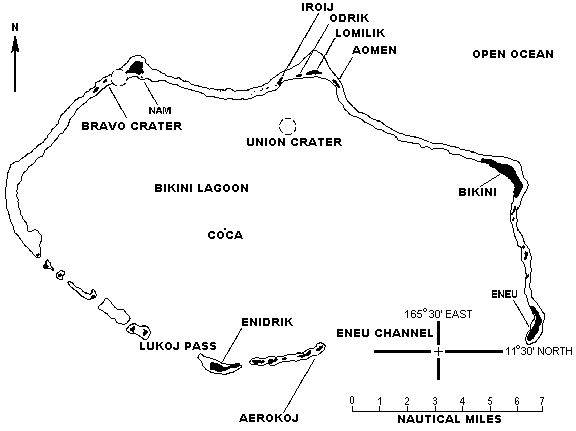
The device's firing crew was located on Enyu island, variously spelled as Eneu island, as depicted here

=== Bomb test personnel take shelter ===
Unanticipated fallout and the radiation emitted by it also affected many of the vessels and personnel involved in the test, in some cases forcing them into bunkers for several hours. In contrast to the crew of the Lucky Dragon No. 5, who did not anticipate the hazard and therefore did not take shelter in the hold of their ship, or refrain from inhaling the fallout dust, the firing crew that triggered the explosion safely sheltered in their firing station when they noticed the wind was carrying the fallout in the unanticipated direction towards the island of Enyu on the Bikini Atoll where they were located, with the fire crew sheltering in place ("buttoning up") for several hours until outside radiation decayed to safer levels. "25 roentgens per hour" was recorded above the bunker.

=== US Navy ships affected ===
The US Navy tanker USS Patapsco was at Enewetak Atoll in late February 1954. Patapsco lacked a decontamination washdown system, and was therefore ordered on 27 February, to return to Pearl Harbor at the highest possible speed. A breakdown in her engine systems, namely a cracked cylinder liner, slowed Patapsco to one-third of her full speed, and when the Castle Bravo detonation took place, she was still about 180 to 195 nautical miles east of Bikini. Patapsco was in the range of nuclear fallout, which began landing on the ship in the mid-afternoon of 2 March. By this time Patapsco was 565 to 586 nautical miles from ground zero. The fallout was at first thought to be harmless and there were no radiation detectors aboard, so no decontamination measures were taken. Measurements taken after Patapsco had returned to Pearl Harbor suggested an exposure range of 0.18 to 0.62 R/hr. Total exposure estimates range from 3.3 R to 18 R of whole-body radiation, taking into account the effects of natural washdown from rain, and variations between above- and below-deck exposure.

=== International incident ===
The fallout spread traces of radioactive material as far as Australia, India and Japan, and even the United States and parts of Europe. Though organized as a secret test, Castle Bravo quickly became an international incident, prompting calls for a ban on the atmospheric testing of thermonuclear devices.

A worldwide network of gummed film stations was established to monitor fallout following Operation Castle. Although meteorological data was poor, a general connection of tropospheric flow patterns with observed fallout was evident. There was a tendency for fallout/debris to remain in tropical latitudes, with incursions into the temperate regions associated with meteorological disturbances of the predominantly zonal flow. Outside of the tropics, the Southwestern United States received the greatest total fallout, about five times that received in Japan.

Stratospheric fallout particles of strontium-90 from the test were later captured with balloon-borne air filters used to sample the air at stratospheric altitudes; the research (Project Ashcan) was conducted to better understand the stratosphere and fallout times, and arrive at more accurate meteorological models after hindcasting.

The fallout from Castle Bravo and other testing on the atoll also affected islanders who had previously inhabited the atoll, and who returned there some time after the tests. This was due to the presence of radioactive caesium-137 in locally grown coconut milk. Plants and trees absorb potassium as part of the normal biological process, but will also readily absorb caesium if present, being of the same group on the periodic table, and therefore very similar chemically. Islanders consuming contaminated coconut milk were found to have abnormally high concentrations of caesium in their bodies and so had to be evacuated from the atoll a second time.

The American magazine Consumer Reports warned of the contamination of milk with strontium-90.

== Impact on US policy ==
The test caused a reassessment of US policies towards nuclear weapons and energy in order to contend with massive international backlash that declared the disaster "intolerable". The following year's Russell–Einstein Manifesto explicitly focused on the hydrogen bomb's threat to human existence demonstrated by the test:

No doubt in an H-bomb war great cities would be obliterated ... If everybody in London, New York and Moscow were exterminated the world might, in the course of a few centuries, recover from the blow. But we now know, especially since the Bikini test, that nuclear bombs can gradually spread destruction over a very much wider area than had been supposed. It is stated on very good authority that a bomb can now be manufactured which will be 2,500 times as powerful (37.5 megatons) as that which destroyed Hiroshima (15 kilotons). Such a bomb, if exploded near the ground or under water, sends radio-active particles into the upper air. They sink gradually and reach the surface of the earth in the form of a deadly dust or rain. It was this dust which infected the Japanese fishermen and their catch of fish.

— Russell-Einstein Manifesto, 9 July 1955

In May 1954 National Security Council meeting, President Dwight D. Eisenhower said "everybody seems to think that we are skunks, saber-rattlers, and warmongers." Secretary of State John Foster Dulles said "comparisons are now being made between ours and Hitler's military machine."

Attempts to repair this image included the yield and fallout limiting of all future tests, and an emphasis on peaceful nuclear energy production, from both nascent fission reactor plants and speculative fusion implosion facilities.

=== Nuclear testing policies ===
==== Total yield and fission yield energy budgets ====
Following the higher-than-expected yields throughout Operation Castle (48.2 Mt total yield to the expected 23 Mt), US policy on thermonuclear testing in the Pacific changed. In 1956, Operation Redwing was conducted on an "energy budget", limiting the total testing yield to 20 Mt, and specifically limiting the fission yield, contentiously divided between Los Alamos Scientific Laboratory and University of California Radiation Laboratory at Livermore. While some very "dirty" fission weapons were tested, this also began the usage of the "materials substitution method", where the fission product fallout-producing uranium-238 tamper was replaced with a "clean" lead tamper, at the cost of halving the yield.

==== 15 megaton yield standard ====
In 1958, during preparation for Operation Hardtack I, the second round of thermonuclear testing since Castle, President Eisenhower established an unwritten rule that no single American test could exceed the 15 Mt yield of Castle Bravo. His successor, John F. Kennedy, adhered to this standard, even following the 50 Mt Soviet Tsar Bomba test in 1961 and pressure from the Department of Defense, Atomic Energy Commission, and the Livermore laboratory. Following the 1963 Partial Nuclear Test Ban Treaty against non-underground tests, American testing continued underground, with the largest yield in the 1971 Grommet Cannikin test at 5 Mt.

=== Impact on scientific direction ===
==== Fission energy ====
The US government's attempts at public relations damage control focused around the existing language of the Atoms for Peace initiative launched four months prior, expanding to the concept of the "peaceful thermonuclear atom". Speaking at a conference six months later, Lewis Strauss, the chair of the Atomic Energy Commission and a primary influence in the crash program of hydrogen bomb development, famously promised a peaceful era of nuclear energy:

It is not too much to expect that our children will enjoy in their homes electrical energy too cheap to meter, will know of great periodic regional famines in the world only as matter of history, will travel effortlessly over the seas and under them and through the air with a minimum of danger and at great speeds, and will experience a lifespan far longer than ours, as disease yields and man comes to understand what causes him to age. This is the forecast for an age of peace.

— Lewis Strauss, Speech to the National Association of Science Writers, September 1954

The Soviet Union had already announced electrical grid connection of the Obninsk Nuclear Power Plant on 27 June. The United States would achieve this briefly with the BORAX-III reactor in 1955 and permanently with the Shippingport Atomic Power Station in 1957.

==== Fusion energy ====
===== Energy from conventional yields =====
In 1957, hydrogen bomb architect Edward Teller and other Livermore weapons scientists proposed a gigawatt-level electrical plant, based on steam generation from 1 megaton bombs dropped every 12 hours into a 1,000 ft cavity. American research on such plants continued throughout the Cold War.

===== Energy from minimal yields =====
Livermore scientist John Nuckolls began a "hectoton group" (100 tons) at the laboratory, investigating ways to remove the fission primary and inventing the concept of low-yield implosions of deuterium-tritium pellets i.e. inertial confinement fusion.

== Weapon history ==
The Soviet Union had previously used lithium deuteride in its Sloika design (known as the "Joe-4" in the U.S.), in 1953. It was not a true hydrogen bomb; fusion provided only 15–20% of its yield, most coming from boosted fission reactions. Its yield was 400 kilotons, and it could not be infinitely scaled, as with a true thermonuclear device.

The Teller–Ulam-based "Ivy Mike" device had a much greater yield of 10.4 Mt, but most of this also came from fission: 77% of the total came from fast fission of its natural-uranium tamper.

Castle Bravo had the greatest yield of any U.S. nuclear test, 15 Mt, though again, a substantial fraction came from fission. In the Teller–Ulam design, the fission and fusion stages were kept physically separate in a reflective cavity. The radiation from the exploding fission primary brought the fuel in the fusion secondary to critical density and pressure, setting off thermonuclear (fusion) chain reactions, which in turn set off a tertiary fissioning of the bomb's ^{238}U fusion tamper and casing. Consequently, this type of bomb is also known as a "fission-fusion-fission" device. The Soviet researchers, led by Andrei Sakharov, developed and tested their first Teller–Ulam device in 1955.

The publication of the Bravo fallout analysis was a militarily sensitive issue, with Joseph Rotblat possibly deducing the staging nature of the Castle Bravo device by studying the ratio and presence of tell-tale isotopes, namely uranium-237, present in the fallout. This information could potentially reveal the means by which megaton-yield nuclear devices achieve their yield. Soviet scientist Andrei Sakharov hit upon what the Soviet Union regarded as "Sakharov's third idea" during the month after the Castle Bravo test, the final piece of the puzzle being the idea that the compression of the secondary can be accomplished by the primary's X-rays before fusion began.

The Shrimp device design later evolved into the Mark 21 nuclear bomb, of which 275 units were produced, weighing 17,600 pounds (8,000 kg) and measuring 12.5 feet (3.8 m) long and 58 inches (1.5 m) in diameter. This 18-megaton bomb was produced until July 1956. In 1957, it was converted into the Mark 36 nuclear bomb and entered into production again.

== Health impacts ==
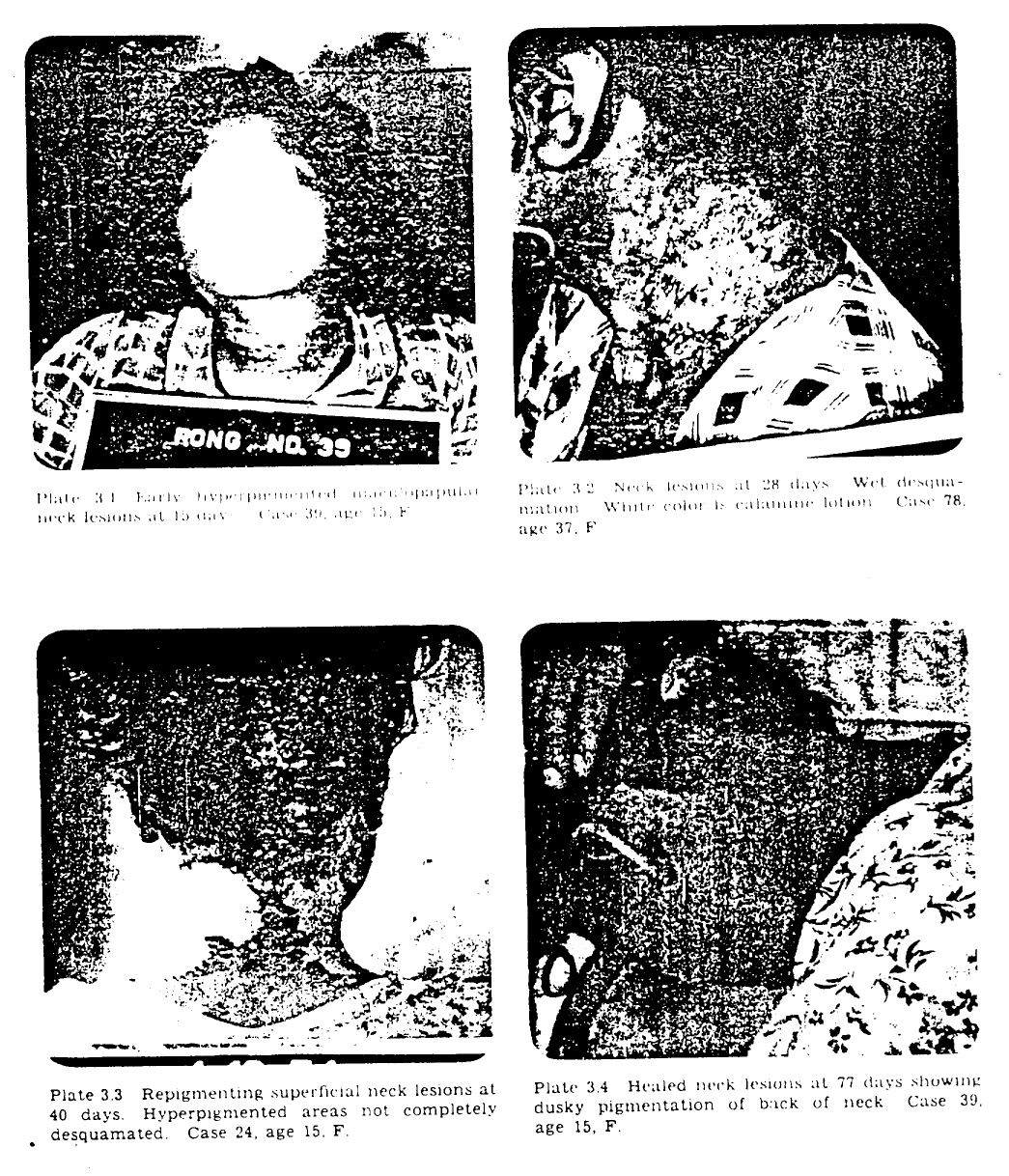
Page 36 from the Project 4.1 final report, showing four photographs of exposed Marshallese. Faces blotted out for privacy reasons.

Following the test, the United States Department of Energy estimated that 253 inhabitants of the Marshall Islands were impacted by the radioactive fallout. This single test exposed the surrounding populations to varying levels of radiation. The fallout levels attributed to the Castle Bravo test are the highest in history. Populations neighboring the test site were exposed to high levels of radiation resulting in mild radiation sickness of many (nausea, vomiting, diarrhea). The unexpected strength of the detonation, combined with shifting wind patterns, sent some of the radioactive fallout over the inhabited atolls of Rongelap and Utrik. Within 52 hours, the 86 people on Rongelap and 167 on Utrik were evacuated to Kwajalein for medical care. Several weeks later, many people began suffering from alopecia (hair loss) and skin lesions.

The exposure to fallout has been linked to increase the likelihood of several types of cancer such as leukemia and thyroid cancer. The relationship between iodine-131 levels and thyroid cancer is still being researched. There are also correlations between fallout exposure levels and diseases such as thyroid disease like hypothyroidism. Populations of the Marshall Islands that received significant exposure to radionuclides have a much greater risk of developing cancer.

There is a presumed association between radiation levels and functioning of the female reproductive system.

== In popular culture ==
The Castle Bravo detonation and the subsequent poisoning of the crew aboard Daigo Fukuryū Maru led to an increase in antinuclear protests in Japan. It was compared to the bombings of Hiroshima and Nagasaki, and the Castle Bravo test was frequently part of the plots of numerous Japanese media, especially in relation to Japan's most widely recognized media icon, Godzilla. In the 2019 film Godzilla: King of the Monsters, Castle Bravo becomes the call sign for Monarch Outpost 54 located in the Atlantic Ocean, near Bermuda.

The Donald Fagen song "Memorabilia" from his 2012 album Sunken Condos mentions both the Castle Bravo and Ivy King nuclear tests.

In 2013, the Defense Threat Reduction Agency published Castle Bravo: Fifty Years of Legend and Lore. The report is a guide to off-site radiation exposures, a narrative history, and a guide to primary historical references concerning the Castle Bravo test. The report focuses on the circumstances that resulted in radioactive exposure of the uninhabited atolls, and makes no attempt to address in detail the effects on or around Bikini Atoll.

== Gallery ==
De-classified military effects-studies for Operation Castle (1954).

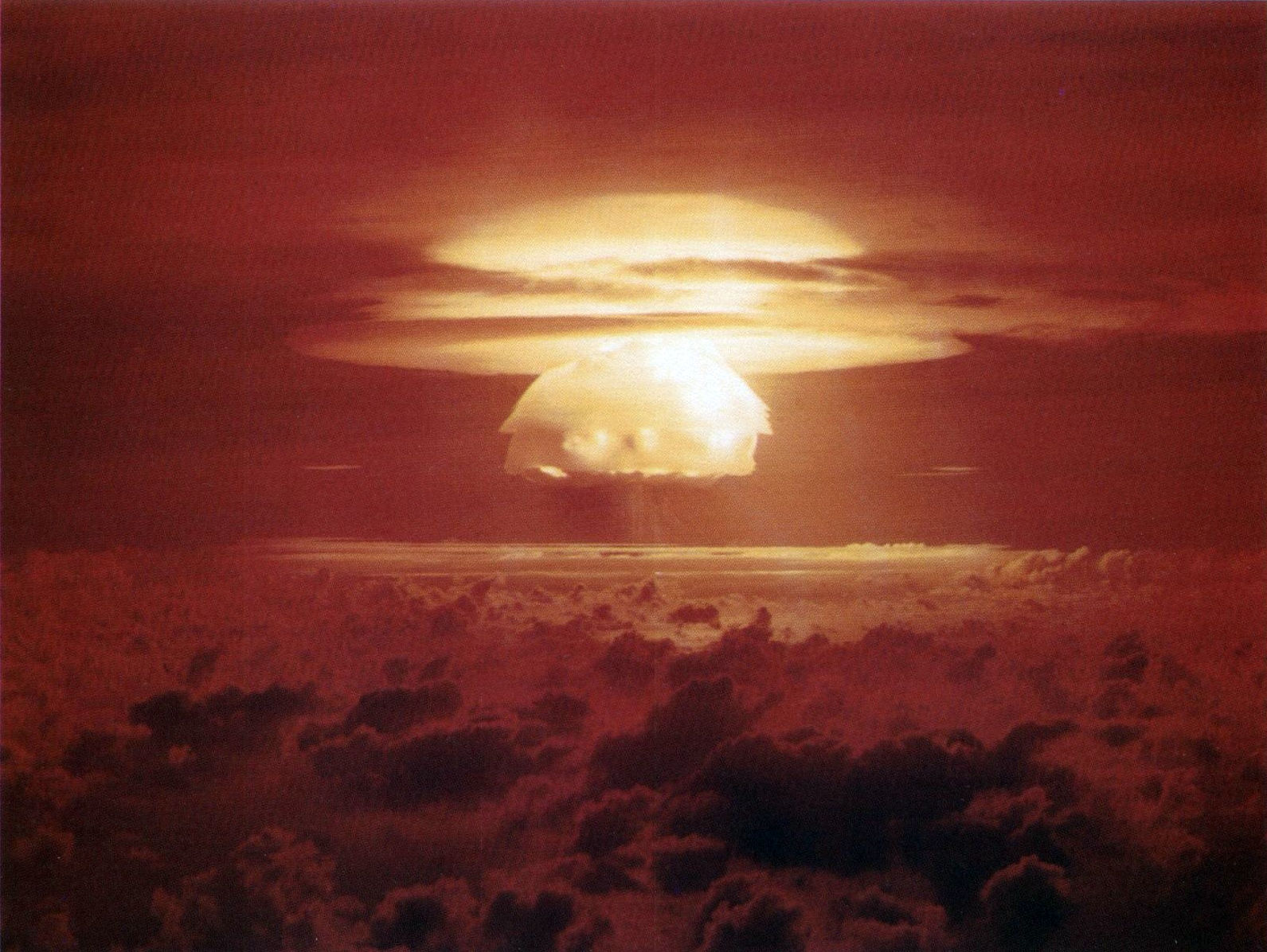

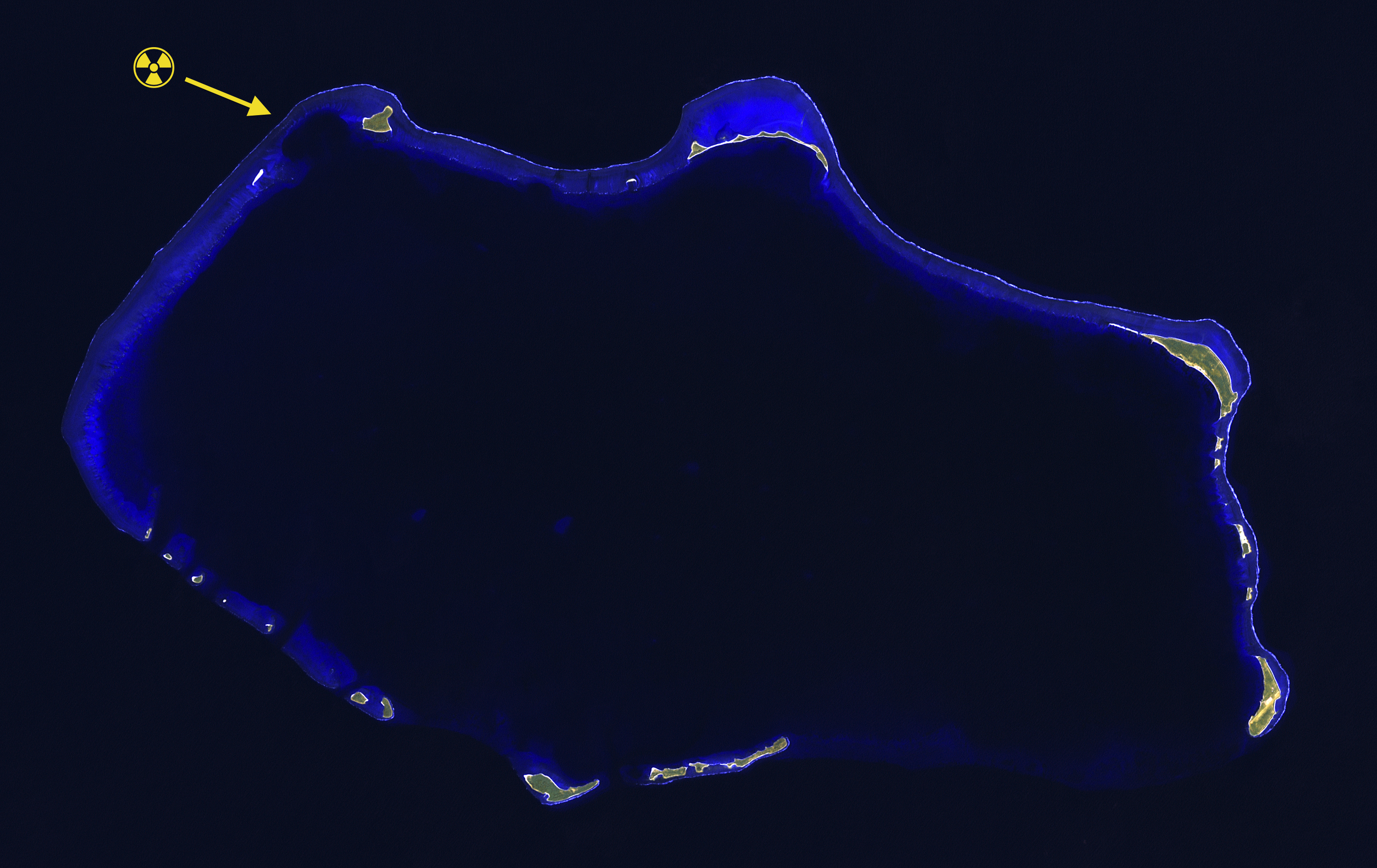
Bravo crater, relative to Bikini Atoll.

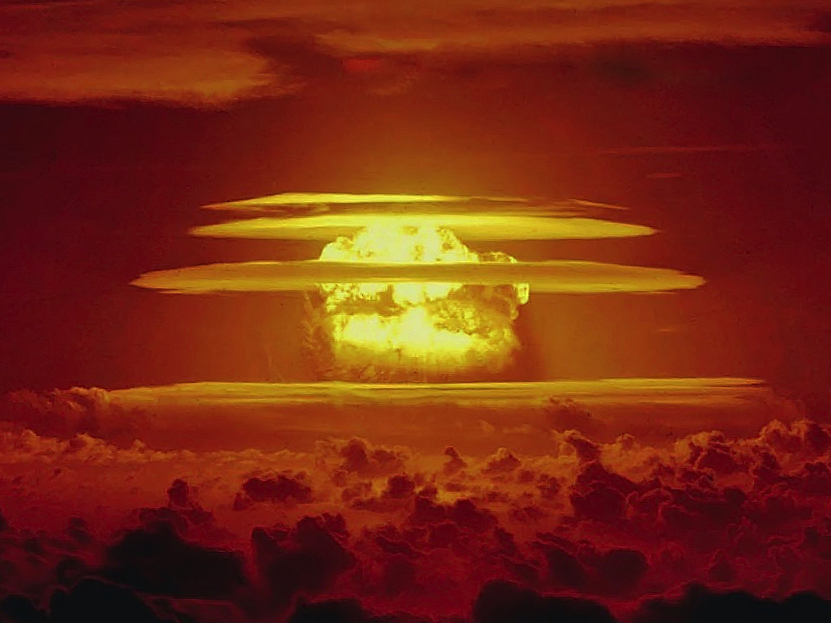

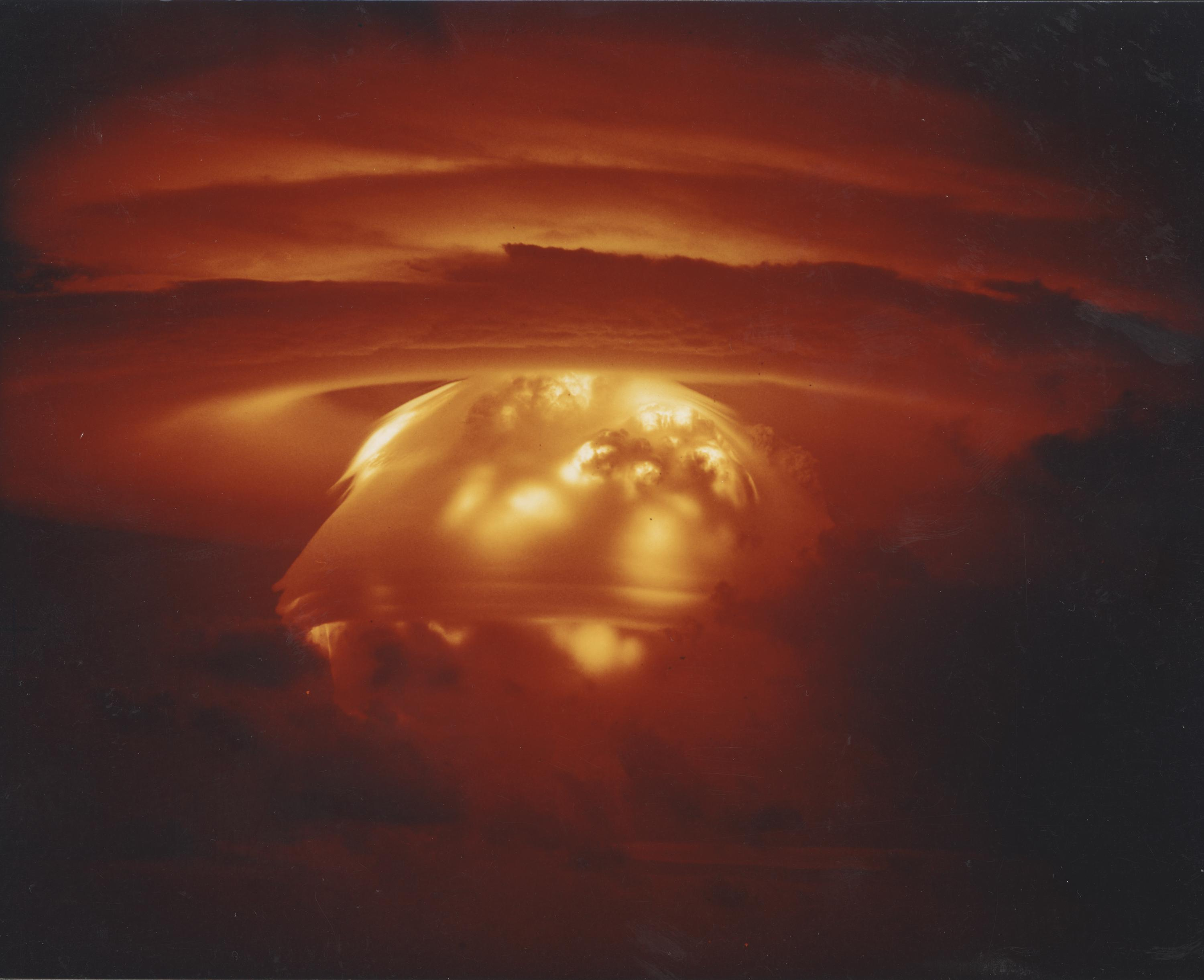

== See also ==
- History of nuclear weapons
- Operation Ivy – Series of 1950s US nuclear tests
- Tsar Bomba – Most powerful nuclear weapon ever tested
- Moruroa, nuclear weapons testing – Atoll in French Polynesia
