= Project 4.1 =

Radioactive fallout exposure study and experiment

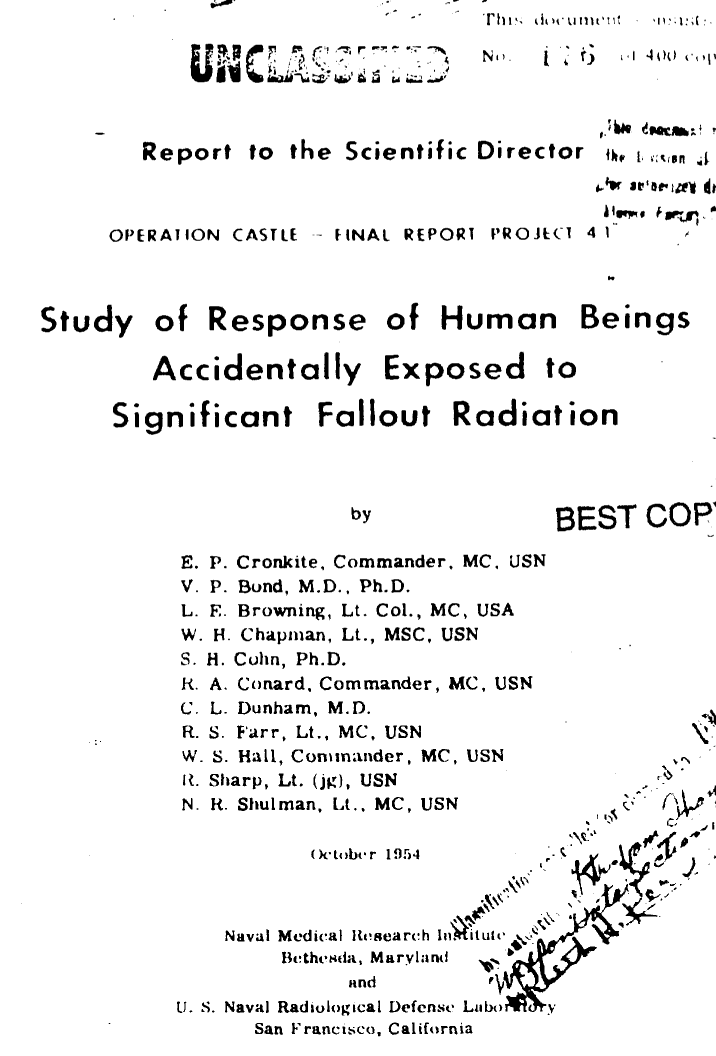
The cover to the Project 4.1 Final Report, "Study of Response of Human Beings Accidentally Exposed to Significant Fallout Radiation"

Project 4.1 was the designation for a medical study and experimentation conducted by the United States of those residents of the Marshall Islands exposed to radioactive fallout from the 1 March 1954 Castle Bravo nuclear test at Bikini Atoll, which had an unexpectedly large yield. Government and mainstream historical sources point to the study being organized on March 6 or 7, 1954, less than a week after the Bravo shot.

== Establishment and secrecy ==
In the wake of the Castle Bravo detonation, a new research section was added to the Castle Bravo Weapons Effects research section. Program 4, "Biomedical effects," was to include one project, Project 4.1, titled "Study of Response of Human Beings exposed to Significant Beta and Gamma Radiation due to Fall-out from High-Yield Weapons." Eugene P. Cronkite of the National Naval Medical Center was designated as Project Officer. Cronkite's instructions stressed the importance of secrecy surrounding the project:

... the project is classified SECRET RESTRICTED DATA. Due to possible adverse public reaction, you will specifically instruct all personnel in this project to be particularly careful not to discuss the purpose of this project and its background or findings with any except those who have specific "need to know."

The purpose of the project, as a 1982 Defense Nuclear Agency report explained, was both medical as well as for research purposes:

The purposes of [Project 4.1] were to (1) evaluate the severity of radiation injury to the human beings exposed, (2) provide for all necessary medical care, and (3) conduct a scientific study of radiation injuries to human beings.

== Preparation ==
As a Department of Energy Committee writing on the human radiation experiments wrote, "It appears to have been almost immediately apparent to the AEC and the Joint Task Force running the Castle series that research on radiation effects could be done in conjunction with the medical treatment of the exposed populations." The DOE report also concluded that "The dual purpose of what is now a DOE medical program has led to a view by the Marshallese that they were being used as 'guinea pigs' in a 'radiation experiment.'"

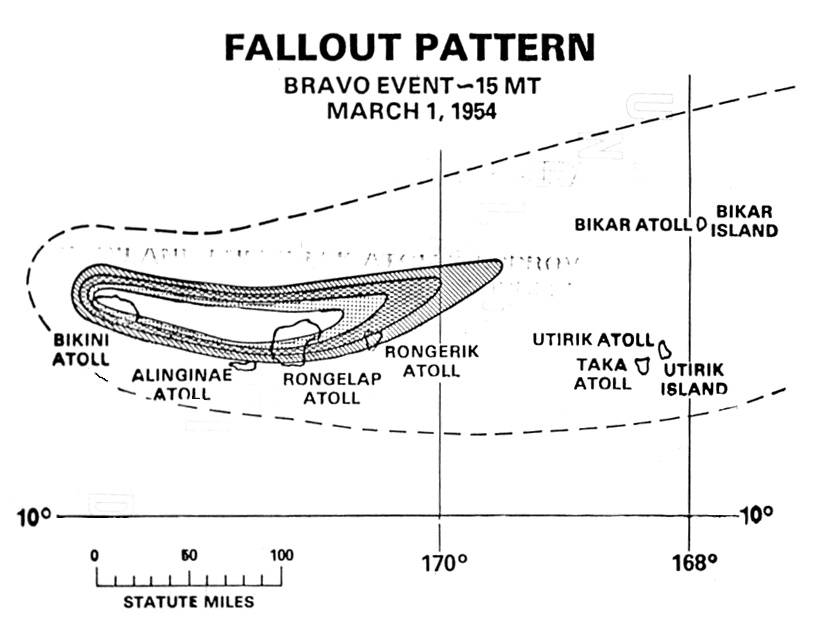
The Castle Bravo fallout plume spread dangerous levels of radiation over an area over 100 miles long, including inhabited islands

Organizations involved in the project included the Naval Medical Research Institute, the Naval Radiological Defense Laboratory, Patrol Squadron 29, the Naval Air Station, Kwajalein, Los Alamos National Laboratory, the Applied Fisheries Laboratory at the University of Washington, and Hanford Atomic Power Operations. Three U.S. Navy ships were used in the project: USS Nicholas, USS Renshaw, and USS Philip. The primary study of the Marshallese was terminated around 75 days after the time of exposure. In July 1954 a meeting at the Division of Biology at the U.S. Atomic Energy Commission decided to complete 6- and 12-month follow-up exposure studies, some of which were later written up as addendums to Project 4.1.

== Intentionality ==
Some Marshallese have alleged that the exposure of the Marshallese was premeditated. In 1972, Micronesian Representative Ataji Balos charged at the Congress of Micronesia that the exposure during Bravo was purposeful so that the AEC could develop medical capabilities for treating those exposed to fallout during nuclear war, and charged that the Marshallese were chosen because of their marginal status in the world at large. According to a U.S. internal transcription of Balos' talk, Balos alleged that "The U.S. chose to make guinea pigs out of our people because they are not white but some brown natives in some remote Pacific islands. Medical treatment that Rongelapese and Utrikese have been receiving is also highly questionable." The AEC issued a staff comment denying these charges.

In 1994, a 1953 Castle Bravo program prospectus was found which included reference to Project 4.1 apparently written before the Bravo shot had occurred. The U.S. government responded that someone had gone back into the project list after the Bravo test to insert Project 4.1; thus, according to the U.S. government, the acts were not premeditated. All other U.S. documents point to Project 4.1 having been established after the Bravo test—most sources point to its having been organized on 7 March 1954. The final Project 4.1 report began in its preface with the statement that "Operation CASTLE did not include a biomedical program" (it mentions this in discussing the ad hoc nature by which the project personnel were assembled). All official and mainstream historical accounts of the Bravo test indicate that its high level of fallout was a result of a miscalculation in relation to its design and was not deliberate (see the Castle Bravo article for more information on the alleged accident).

Barton C. Hacker, the official historian of U.S. nuclear testing exposures (who considered the U.S. handling of the Bravo incident to be subpar), characterized the controversy in the following way:

In March 1954, the AEC had quickly decided that learning how the Marshallese victims of Castle Bravo responded to their accidental exposure could be of immense medical and military value. Immediate action centered on seeing them evacuated and decontaminated, then cared for medically. But studies of their exposures and aftereffects also began. That effort became project 4.1 in the Castle experimental program. This unfortunate choice of terminology may help explain later charges that the AEC had deliberately exposed the Marshallese to observe the effects. Like the American radium dial painters of the 1920s and the Japanese of Hiroshima and Nagasaki in 1945, the Marshallese of 1954 inadvertently were to provide otherwise unobtainable data on the human consequences of high radiation exposures. Findings from project 4.1 soon began to appear in print.

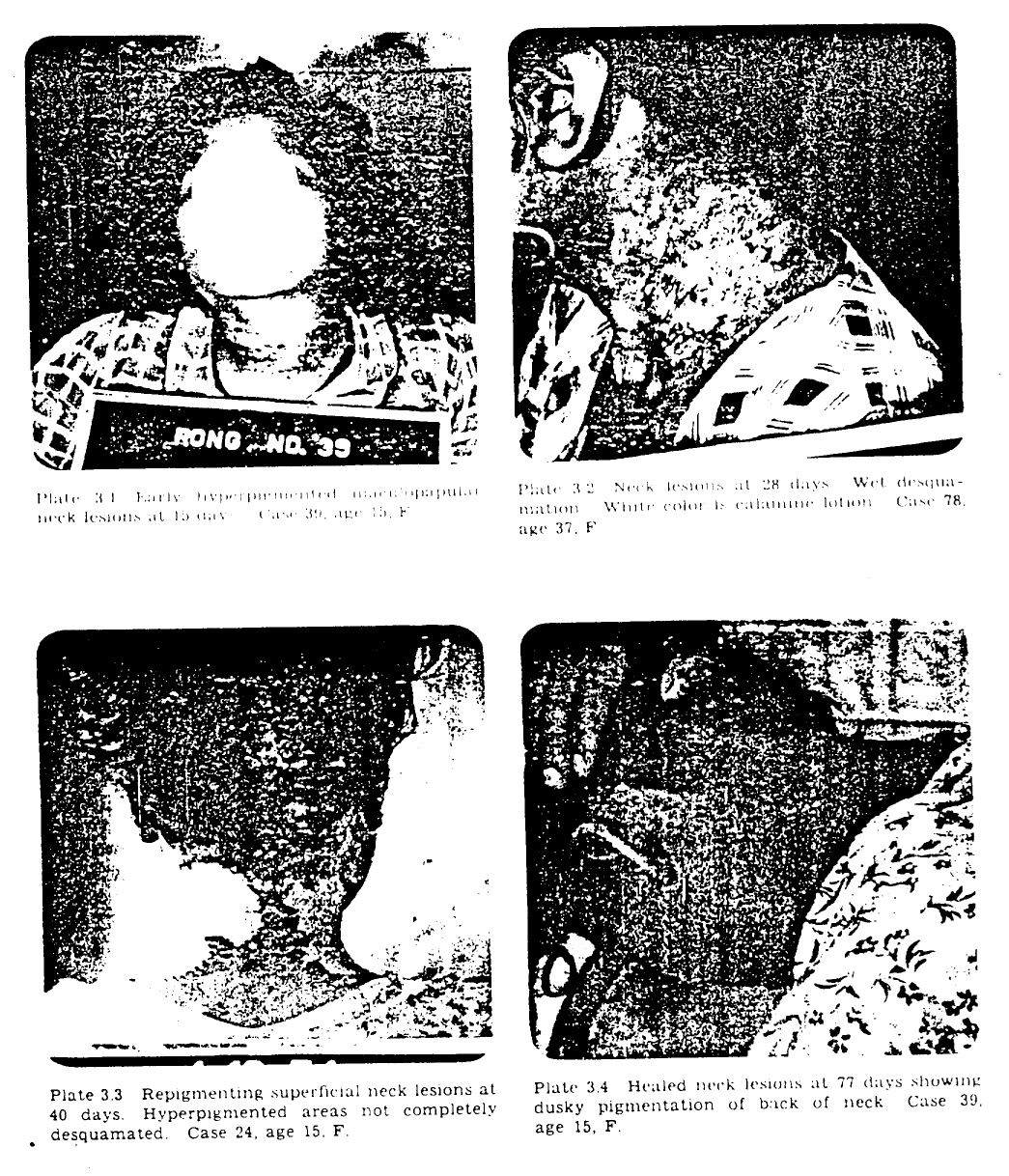
Photographs of exposed Marshallese studied during Project 4.1 (in this case, the photographs are showing the development and healing of neck lesions) caused by the nuclear fallout sticking to the common damp areas of exposed human skin, and the resulting beta burns

Controversy continues however, fed by the legacy of mistrust sown by American nuclear testing in the Marshall Islands, which involved relocating hundreds of people and rendering several atolls uninhabitable. While most sources do not think that the exposure was intentional, there is no dispute that the United States did carefully study the exposed Marshallese, but never obtained informed consent from the study subjects. This study of the Marshallese was in some cases beneficial for their treatment, and in other cases not. In these ways, the study of the exposed Marshallese reflects the same ethical lapses as were undertaken in other aspects of the secret human radiation experiments conducted by the Atomic Energy Commission in the 1940s and 1950s, which came to light only after the end of the Cold War.

== Results about effects ==
According to the Final Project 4.1 report, the Bravo test exposed 239 Marshallese on the Utirik, Rongelap, and Ailinginae Atolls to significant level of radiation, and 28 Americans stationed on the Rongerik Atoll were also exposed. Those on the Rongelap Atoll were the most seriously affected, receiving approximately 175 rads of radiation before they were evacuated. Those on Ailinginae received 69 rads, those on Utirik received 14 rads, and the Americans on Rongerik received an average dose of 78 rads.

The results of the original Project 4.1 were published by the study's authors in professional medical journals in 1955, such as the Journal of the American Medical Association.

In 2010 it was calculated that by sub-population, the projected proportion of cancers attributable to radiation from fallout from all nuclear tests conducted in the Marshall Islands is 55% (with a 28% to 69% uncertainty range) among 82 persons exposed in 1954 on Rongelap Atoll and Ailinginae Atoll.

Most of the individuals exposed did not immediately show signs of radiation sickness, though within a few days other effects of significant radiation exposure manifested: loss of hair and significant skin damage, including "raw, weeping lesions", among the Rongelap and Ailinginae groups. The lesions healed quickly, however, consistent with radiation exposure. The report abstract concluded that "estimates of total body burden indicate that there is no long term hazard."

Additional follow-up checks on the Marshallese studied in Project 4.1 were conducted at regular intervals afterwards every year since 1954. Though the Marshallese experienced far milder immediate effects than the Japanese fishermen exposed to Bravo fallout on the fishing boat Daigo Fukuryū Maru, the long-term effects were more pronounced as they depended largely on subsistence living and were relocated to the site of the testing in Bikini, Ene Wetak, and Rongelap while the Japanese fisherman were returned to Japan. For the first decade after the test, the effects were ambiguous and statistically difficult to correlate to radiation exposure: miscarriages and stillbirths among exposed Rongelap women doubled in the first five years after the accident, but then returned to normal; some developmental difficulties and impaired growth appeared in children, but in no clear-cut pattern. In the decades that followed, though, the effects were undeniable. Children began to disproportionately develop thyroid cancer (due to exposure to radioiodines), and almost a third of those exposed developed neoplasms by 1974.

== Report citations ==
This is a list of reports made under Project 4.1. This list is not exhaustive.

- E.P. Cronkite, V.P. Bond, L.E. Browning, W.H. Chapman, S.H. Cohn, R.A. Conard, C.L. Dunham, R.S. Farr, W.S. Hall, R. Sharp, N.R. Shulman, Study of Response of Human Beings Accidentally Exposed to Significant Fallout Radiation, Operation CASTLE, Project 4.1, Naval Medical Research Institute, Naval Radiological Defense Laboratory, Defense Atomic Support Agency, Oak Ridge National Laboratory, Report #WT-923 (October 1954). Online at http://worf.eh.doe.gov/data/ihp2/2776_.pdf.
- S.H. Cohn, R.W. Rinehart, J.K. Gong, J.S. Robertson, W.L. Milne, W.H. Chapman, V.P. Bond, Nature and Extent of Internal Radioactive Contamination of Human Beings, Plants, and Animals Exposed to Fallout, Operation CASTLE, Project 4.1, Naval Radiological Defense Laboratory, Naval Medical Research Institute, Report #WT-936 (December 1955). Online at http://worf.eh.doe.gov/data/ihp1d/6205e.pdf.
- V.P. Bond, R.A. Conrad, J.S. Robertson, E.A. Weden, Medical Examination of Rongelap People Six Months After Exposure to Fallout, Operation CASTLE, Project 4.1 Addendum, Naval Medical Research Institute, Naval Radiological Defense Laboratory, Report #WT-937 (April 1955). Online at http://worf.eh.doe.gov/data/ihp2/2774_.pdf.
- R. Sharp, W.H. Chapman, Exposure of Marshall Islanders and American Military Personnel to Fallout, Operation CASTLE, Project 4.1 Addendum, Naval Medical Research Institute, Report #WT-938 EX (March 1957). Online at http://worf.eh.doe.gov/data/ihp2a/0283_a.pdf.
- C.A. Sondhaus, V.P. Bond, Physical Factors and Dosimetry in the Marshall Island Radiation Exposures, Operation CASTLE, Report on Addendum Report for Project 4.1 Naval Radiological Defense Laboratory Report #WT-939 (December 1955). Online at http://worf.eh.doe.gov/data/ihp1d/15187e.pdf.
