= Giff Johnson =

Marshall Islands editor and journalist

- Occupations: Editor, Journalist, Correspondent, author
- Spouse: Darlene Keju (Deceased)

Giff Johnson is a Marshall Islands-based editor and journalist. He is also the author of the self-published book Don't Ever Whisper, which tells of his late wife Darlene Keju's fight to share the Marshall Islanders plight with the rest of the world. In 2013, he was interviewed by ABC Radio presenter Geraldine Coutts in relation to the book.

== Career ==
Johnson is the editor of the Marshall Islands Journal. He is also the Marshall Islands correspondent for Radio New Zealand and for ABC Radio Australia.

=== Previous roles ===
He was for a period of time from early 2001 to 2003, the interim managing editor of Pacific Magazine. He continued as Pacific Magazine’s contributing editor from where he was based in Majuro, Marshall Islands until Pacific Magazine halted publication in 2008. He has been a freelance writer and was also an editor for the Honolulu-published Micronesia Bulletin from 1976 to 1984.

=== Books ===
- "Collision Course at Kwajalein: Marshall Islanders in the Shadow of the Bomb," 1984, Pacific Concerns Resource Center, Honolulu.
- "Nuclear Past, Unclear Future," 2009, Micronitor News and Printing Co., Majuro.
- Don't ever whisper : Darlene Keju, Pacific health pioneer, champion for nuclear survivors, 2013
- "Idyllic No More: Pacific Island Climate, Corruption and Development Dilemmas," 2015.

== Personal ==
Johnson, who is originally from the United States, has lived in the Marshall Islands since 1984. In 1982, he married Darlene Keju on Wotje Atoll in the Marshall Islands. Keju was an outspoken advocate for nuclear weapons test victims in the Marshall Islands and a public health worker who engaged young people with innovative programs for community health development. They were married for 14 years. She died of cancer at the age of 45. A celebration of her life with short speeches and Marshallese music and singing was held at the Church of the Crossroads in Hawaii. In 1998, Johnson married Mathilda Rakin in Majuro. They have one son, Iohaan, and one daughter, Beverly.
