= Castle Romeo =

Codename for one of the first thermonuclear bomb tests

Coordinates: 11°41′50″N 165°16′19″E

- Castle Romeo mushroom cloud

Information
- Country: United States
- Test series: Operation Castle
- Test site: Bikini Atoll
- Date: 27 March 1954; 72 years ago
- Test type: Atmospheric
- Yield: 11 Mt

Test chronology

Castle Romeo was the code name given to one of the tests in the Operation Castle series of U.S. nuclear tests. It was the first test of the TX-17 thermonuclear weapon, the first deployed thermonuclear bomb.

It was detonated on 27 March 1954, at Bikini Atoll of the Marshall Islands, on a barge moored in the middle of the crater from the Castle Bravo test. It was the first of several such barge-based tests at Bikini after the Castle Bravo disaster.

== Deployment ==
The tested design became the first air-droppable thermonuclear device, initially the "emergency capability" EC-17, of which only five were made. The first deployable staged radiation implosion Teller-Ulam thermonuclear weapon evolved into the Mark 17, of which 200 were made. Both of those were huge devices, weighing 39,000 pounds (18 t) and 42,000 pounds (19 t) respectively. As a result, only the B-36 was capable of carrying that first generation of thermonuclear bombs. They were also some of the largest yield devices deployed by Strategic Air Command — the EC-17 producing around 10 megatonnes (Mt), and the Mk 17 between 11 and 15 Mt. They were all out of service by August 1957.

== Design ==
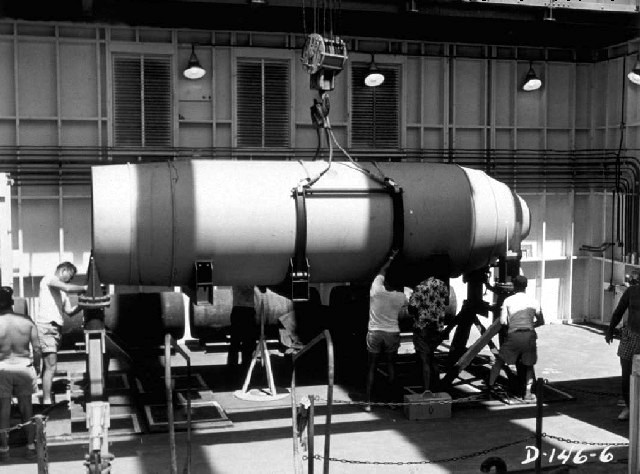
The Runt device

The Runt TX-15 device was a weaponized dry fusion bomb, using lithium deuteride fuel for the fusion stage of a staged fusion bomb, unlike the cryogenic liquid deuterium of the first-generation Ivy Mike fusion device.

Similar to the Shrimp TX-21 device tested before in the Castle Bravo test, it differed from that device in using lithium deuteride derived from natural lithium (a mixture of 7.5% lithium-6 and 92.5% lithium-7 isotopes) as the source of the tritium and deuterium fusion fuels, as opposed to the relative high enrichment level of lithium (approximately 40% lithium-6) deuteride used in Bravo.

== Yield ==
Like the Bravo test, it produced far more than its predicted yield, and for the same reason — an unexpected participation of the common lithium-7 isotope in fusion reactions. Although it had been predicted to produce a yield of 4 megatons with a range of 1.5 to 7 megatons (before the results of the Bravo test caused an upgrade in the estimates, it had originally been estimated to produce 3–5 megatons), it actually produced a yield of 11 megatons, the third-largest test ever conducted by the U.S.

Like the Ivy Mike and Castle Bravo tests, a large percentage of the yield was produced by fast fission of the natural uranium "tamper"; 7 megatons of the yield were from this source.

== Fireball in popular culture ==
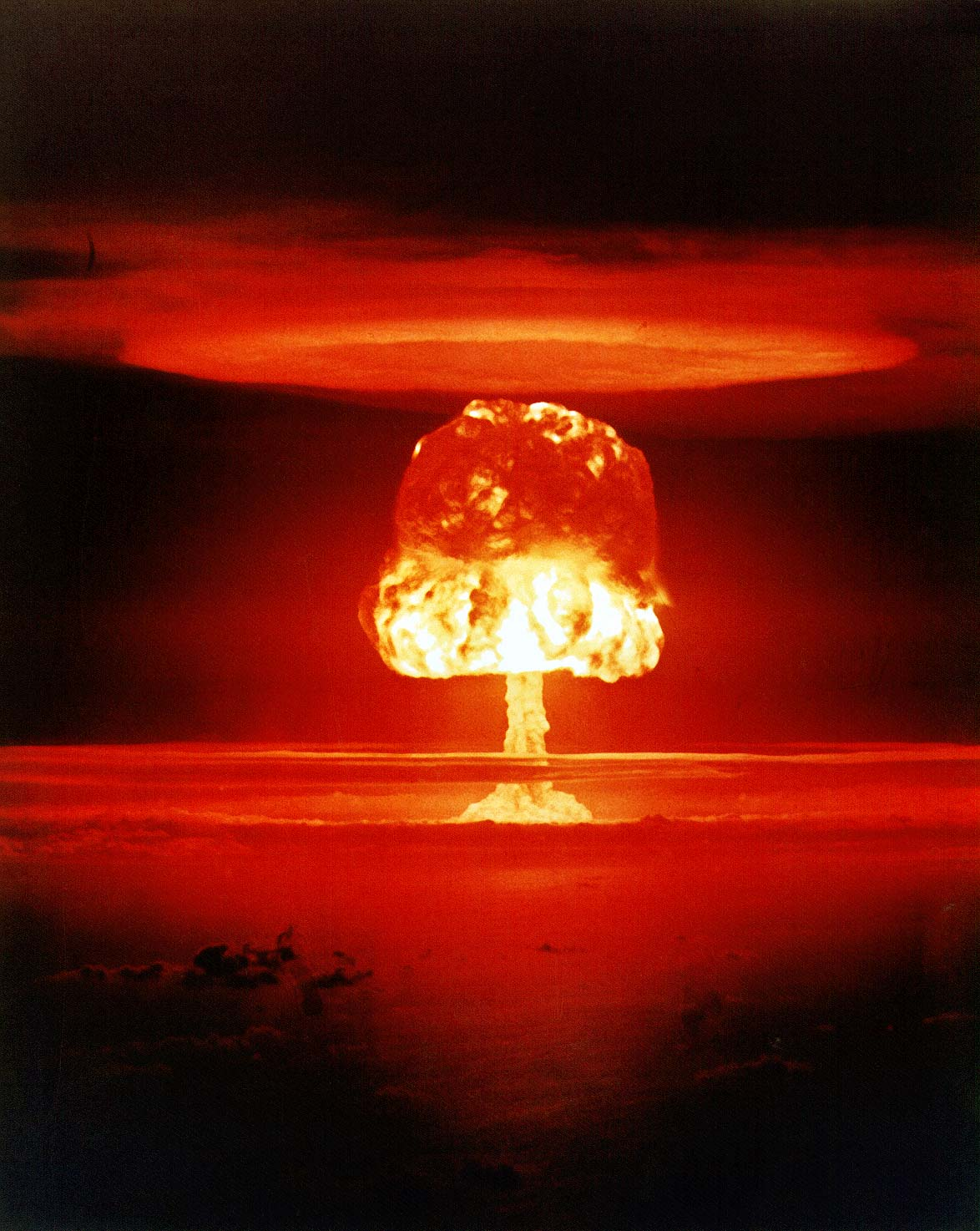
Iconic image of the Castle Romeo mushroom cloud, 27 March 1954

One particular image of the Castle Romeo mushroom cloud has been one of the most highly reprinted images of a nuclear explosion. It often serves as a stand-in for nuclear weapons in general for news stories, book covers, magazine articles, etc., likely because of its threatening appearance and extreme red, orange, and yellow hues. The fact that the explosion is of a U.S. megaton-range weapon has not prevented it from being used to represent the arsenals of other states or weapons of far lower yields in many cases, which would have a very different appearance.

One prominent usage is as the backdrop for American thrash metal band Megadeth's compilation album Greatest Hits: Back to the Start, released in 2005. The image of Castle Romeo was also used on the cover of the New York hardcore music pioneers Cro-Mags debut studio album The Age of Quarrel in 1986. It is also featured on the title screen of Team17's turn-based artillery game Worms Armageddon.

The Castle Romeo photos are sometimes confused with that of Castle Bravo. The two nuclear blasts looked very similar, and they were both conducted in the same location, but much of Bravo's photographic record was destroyed because of its unexpectedly high yield.
