= Gummed film =

Nuclear fallout measurement technique

Gummed film refers to a technique used to measure nuclear fallout. It involves the use of a sheet of plastic (cellulose acetate) or paper substrate coated on one side with an adhesive (e.g., rubber cement). The sheet is exposed (adhesive-side up) to the environment to be monitored, where fallout particles land on (and thus adhere to) the gummed film. After some period, the films are collected and analyzed for radioactivity.
