= Strategic nuclear weapon =

Nuclear weapons used on strategic targets outside of battlefields

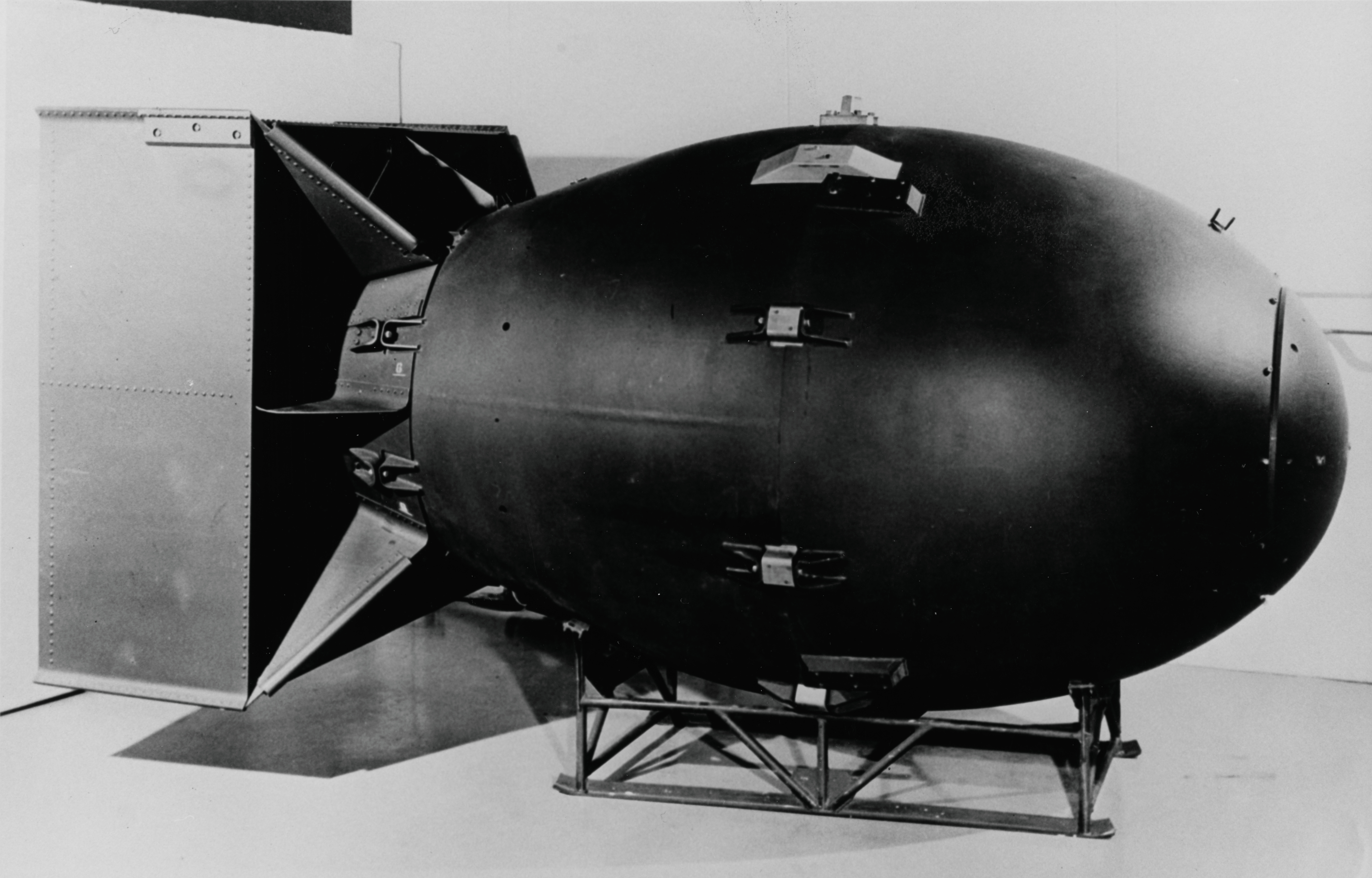
Fat Man was a strategic nuclear weapon dropped on the Japanese city of Nagasaki during the final stages of World War II.

A strategic nuclear weapon (SNW) is a nuclear weapon that is designed to be used on targets often in settled territory far from the battlefield as part of a strategic plan, such as military bases, military command centers, arms industries, transportation, economic, and energy infrastructure, and countervalue targets such areas such as cities and towns. It is in contrast to a tactical nuclear weapon, which is designed for use in battle as part of an attack with and often near friendly conventional forces, possibly on contested friendly territory. As of 2026, strategic nuclear weapons have been used twice in the 1945 United States bombings of Hiroshima and Nagasaki.

== Definition ==
Strategic nuclear weapons generally have significantly larger yields, typically starting from 100 kilotons up to destructive yields of multiple megaton for use especially to maximize damage in the enemy nation's interior far from friendly forces, with targets including buried hard targets like a missile silo, or wide area targets like a large bomber or naval base. However, yields can overlap, and many weapons such as the variable yield B61 nuclear bomb which could be used at low power by a fighter-bomber in an interdiction strike or at high yield dropped by a strategic bomber against an enemy submarine pen. The W89 200 kiloton (0.2 MT) warhead armed both the tactical Sea Lance area effect anti-submarine weapon for use far out at sea and the strategic bomber launched SRAM II stand off missile designed for use in the Soviet Union's interior. The strategic attacks on Hiroshima and Nagasaki utilized weapons of between 10 and 20 kilotons, but that was because the "Little Boy" and "Fat Man" bombs were the most destructive and only nuclear weapons then available. There is no precise definition of the "strategic" category for either range nor yield. The yield of tactical nuclear weapons is generally lower than that of strategic nuclear weapons, but larger ones are still very powerful, and some variable-yield warheads serve in both roles. Modern tactical nuclear warheads have yields up to the tens or potentially hundreds of kilotons, several times that of those used in the atomic bombings of Hiroshima and Nagasaki.

== History ==
Strategic thinking under the Eisenhower administration and Secretary of State John Foster Dulles was that of massive retaliation in the face of the Soviet Union's nuclear arsenal. The two superpowers developed many of the most destructive deployed thermonuclear weapons. Every bit of destructive power that could be delivered to the enemy's interior was considered advantageous in maintaining deterrence and would become the basis of the US strategic arsenal. Flexible response was a defense strategy first implemented by President John F. Kennedy in 1961 to address the administration's skepticism of the policy of massive retaliation in the face of strike options limited to total war during the Cuban Missile Crisis. That, along with cost, increasingly-accurate targeting, multiple warheads per delivery vehicle, and a desire for greater flexibility in targeting especially with respect to increasing sensitivity to collateral damage in some scenarios, began the trend to reducing individual warhead yields in strategic weapon systems.

Strategic missiles and bombers are assigned preplanned targets including enemy airfields, radars, and surface to air defenses; but the strategic mission was to eliminate the enemy nation's national defenses to allow following strategic bombers and missiles to penetrate and threaten in force the enemy nation's strategic forces, command, population, and economy more realistically, rather than targeting purely military assets in nearly real time using tactical weapons, with range and yield optimized for this type of time-sensitive attack mission often near friendly forces.

Early ICBMs had an unfavorable circular error probable (CEP); the strategic missiles and, in some conditions, bombers had low targeting accuracy. Additionally, much early Cold War strategic asset construction was above-ground soft targets or minimally-hardened such as airfields, pre-nuclear command and control installations, defensive infrastructure, and even ICBM bases. When every missile carried only one poorly-guided warhead designing systems with massive warhead yields to cause a huge damage footprint, with the possibility of potentially destroying several nearby soft targets of opportunity and increasing the likelihood that the primary target was within the overlap of CEP and destruction circle the highest possible yield warhead for the missile was considered an advantage. The enemy being targeted a continent away was a low ratio of side effects to friendly areas, which contrasted the potential damage to enemy assets. As navigation technology improved the accuracy and many missiles and nearly all bombers were equipped with multiple nuclear warheads the trend was to reduce warhead yield both for weight and to give more flexibility in targeting with respect to collateral damage, target hardening also created a situation in which even a very large warhead with excellent targeting would still destroy only one target, gaining no advantage to its large weight and expense, as opposed to several smaller MIRVs.

A feature of strategic nuclear weapons, especially in the transcontinental nature of the Cold War, with continent-spanning superpowers that are oceans apart, is the greater range of their delivery apparatus, such as ICBMs, giving them the ability to threaten the enemy's command and control structure and national infrastructure even though they were based many thousands of miles away in friendly territory. ICBMs with nuclear warheads are the primary strategic nuclear weapons, and short-range missiles are tactical. In addition, while tactical weapons are designed to meet battlefield objectives without destroying nearby friendly forces, one main purpose of strategic weapons is deterrence under the theory of mutually assured destruction. In the case of two small bordering nations, a strategic weapon could have a quite short range and still be designed or intended for strategic targeting. Specifically, on the Korean Peninsula, with a nuclear-armed North Korea facing off against an NPT-compliant South Korea there have been calls to request a return of US-owned short range low yield nuclear weapons, nomenclatured as tactical by the US military, to provide a local strategic deterrent to the North's growing domestically produced nuclear arsenal and delivery systems.

After the Cold War, the tactical nuclear weapon stockpiles of NATO and Russia were greatly reduced. Highly-accurate strategic missiles like the Trident II can also be used in substrategic, tactical strikes.

== De-escalation strikes ==
According to several reports, including by the Carnegie Endowment for International Peace and Bulletin of the Atomic Scientists, as a result of the effectiveness and acceptability of United States Air Force use of precision munitions with little collateral damage in the Kosovo conflict in what amounted to strategic destruction once only possible with nuclear weapons or massive bombing, Vladimir Putin, then-secretary of the Security Council of Russia, formulated a concept ("escalate to de-escalate") of using both tactical and strategic nuclear threats and strikes to de-escalate or cause an enemy to disengage from a conventional conflict threatening what Russia considers a strategic interest. The lowered threshold for use of nuclear weapons by Russia is disputed by other experts.

== List of strategic nuclear weapons of the US ==
- Mark 14 nuclear bomb
- Mark 15 nuclear bomb
- Mark 16 nuclear bomb
- Mark 17 nuclear bomb
- Mark 21 nuclear bomb
- Mark 24 nuclear bomb
- B41 nuclear bomb
- B53 nuclear bomb
- B61 nuclear bomb except Mod-4 and Mod-10
- B83 nuclear bomb
- W62 nuclear warhead
- W76 nuclear warhead except Mod-2
- W78 nuclear warhead
- W80 nuclear warhead
- W87 nuclear warhead
- W88 nuclear warhead
- W93 nuclear warhead (future)
