= Jughead (disambiguation) =

Jughead Jones is a fictional character in Archie Comics.

Jughead may also refer to:

- Jughead (comic book), a comic book series
- "Jughead" (Lost), a 2009n TV episode
- Jughead (search engine), for the Gopher protocol
- John Jughead Pierson, an American musician, writer, actor, and podcaster
- "Jughead", a song on the 1991 Prince album Diamonds and Pearls
- Jughead, a Mark 16 nuclear bomb due to be tested in the 1954 Castle Yankee thermonuclear bomb test

== See also ==
- Jughaid, a character in the newspaper comic Barney Google and Snuffy Smith
