= Mk 21 =

Mark 21 or Mk XXI or variation, may refer to:

- 5"/38 MK 30, a variant of the 5-inch/38-caliber gun
- Beaufighter Mark 21, a variant of the Bristol Beaufighter
- Mk 21 (type 356), a variant of the Supermarine Spitfire (Griffon-powered variants)
- Freighter Mk 21, a variant of the Bristol Freighter
- Mk 21 Mod 0, a 7.62×51mm variant of the M1919 Browning machine gun
- Mk. 21 aircraft interception radar
- Mark 21 nuclear bomb
- Mk 21 Precision Sniper Rifle (PSR), based on the Remington MSR
- MK 21 Mod 0 Scalable Offensive Hand Grenade
