= Mark 24 =

Mark 24 or MK24 or variation, may refer to:

== Military ==
- HK45, a .45 ACP-caliber handgun designated as the MK24
- The MK24 variant of the Griffon-powered Supermarine Spitfire
- Mark 24 Tigerfish, a British torpedo
- Mark 24 nuclear bomb
- Mark 24 Mine
