= Jughead (Lost) =

- Lost episode
- Daniel Faraday (Jeremy Davies) examines the Jughead, a hydrogen bomb.
- Episode no.: Season 5 Episode 3
- Directed by: Rod Holcomb
- Written by: Elizabeth Sarnoff; Paul Zbyszewski
- Production code: 503
- Original air date: January 28, 2009
- Running time: 43 minutes

Guest appearances
- Nestor Carbonell as Richard Alpert; Sonya Walger as Penny Widmore; Alan Dale as Charles Widmore; Tom Connolly as Young Charles Widmore; Alexandra Krosney as Ellie; Imelda Corcoran as Abigail Spencer; Matthew Alan as Cunningham; Dan Hildebrand as Custodian; Mary Ann Taheny as Moira; Raymond Ma as Efren Salonga; Sarah Farooqui as Theresa Spencer; Tuli Roy-Kirwan as Melanie

Episode chronology
← Previous "The Lie"	Next → "The Little Prince"
- Lost season 5

"Jughead" is the third television episode of the fifth season of ABC's Lost. The 89th episode of the show overall, "Jughead" aired on January 28, 2009, on ABC in the United States, being simulcast on A in Canada. The episode was written by co-executive producer Elizabeth Sarnoff and supervising producer Paul Zbyszewski and directed by "Hearts and Minds" director Rod Holcomb.

In 2007, Desmond Hume searches for a woman who could help the survivors stuck on the island stop the shifts. On the island, in 1954, John Locke, James "Sawyer" Ford and Juliet Burke try to save Daniel Faraday, Charlotte Lewis and Miles Straume from the Others.

== Plot ==
The episode opens with a flashback of Desmond Hume (Henry Ian Cusick), in the Philippines, searching for a doctor to help his wife Penny Widmore (Sonya Walger), who is giving birth to their son, Charlie. In 2007, Desmond and Penny arrive in London, (Note: After the events of Because You Left.) where Desmond plans to look for Daniel Faraday's (Jeremy Davies) mother, who is believed to be at Oxford University. However, the university has no record of either Faraday, even though Daniel was a professor there. Desmond breaks into Faraday's lab (which he visited during the events of "The Constant") and searches it. He meets a janitor who tells him that Faraday conducted experiments on a woman and provides an address for her. At her house, Desmond finds that the woman is in a vegetative state after experiencing temporal disassociation, similar to Desmond's experiences on the freighter. (Note: As depicted in The Constant.) He learns that Penny's father, Charles Widmore (Alan Dale), is not only paying her medical expenses, but also funded Daniel's research. Desmond confronts Widmore, who gives him the address of Daniel's mother in Los Angeles. Desmond returns to Penny, who agrees that they must travel to Los Angeles.

In 1954, (Note: After the events of The Lie.) Juliet Burke (Elizabeth Mitchell), John Locke (Terry O'Quinn) and James "Sawyer" Ford (Josh Holloway) interrogate the two men they have captured. Juliet deduces that they are members of the Others because they can speak Latin. One of the men, who is revealed to be a young Widmore (Tom Connolly), kills the other when he agrees to lead them to Richard Alpert (Nestor Carbonell) and flees to his campsite to warn his people. Locke follows him and meets with Alpert, using Jacob's name and the compass Alpert gave him to gain his trust; however, Alpert is not entirely convinced. Locke tells Alpert to visit him after he is born in 1956. (Note: As depicted in Cabin Fever.) Locke attempts to convince Alpert to show him how to leave the island, but runs out of time as the next time shift jump occurs.

At the same time, the freighter team, consisting of Miles Straume (Ken Leung), Charlotte Lewis (Rebecca Mader), and Daniel Faraday, are captured by another group of Others, led by Ellie (Alexandra Krosney). Faraday deduces that the American military had come to the island to test hydrogen bombs, and that the Others killed them and are in possession of a bomb. When he convinces Alpert to let him defuse the bomb, Alpert counters and asked Faraday to prove that he is not on a suicide mission to detonate the bomb. Faraday then confesses his love for Charlotte as proof that he will not detonate the bomb on purpose. Ellie leads Faraday to the bomb (the titular Jughead), and after an inspection, he discovers that it is leaking radiation. Faraday immediately advises Ellie that the bomb should be buried and will not go off for at least 50 years, inadvertently revealing that he is from the future. Ellie doesn't believe him, but Juliet and Sawyer shows up and disarm her. The time shift jump occurs once again and the group is safe, but Charlotte suddenly collapses with a nosebleed.

== Production ==
"Jughead" is the first episode of Lost to be co-written by Paul Zbyszewski, who joined the writing staff prior to the start of production on season five. Elizabeth Mitchell learned as much Latin as she could for the episode. Mitchell said she could not "just learn it phonetically", so she spent the "whole weekend" trying to learn the language on the phone with a Latin professor.

"Jughead" was the name of an actual Mark 16 nuclear bomb that was never detonated in the South Pacific. It was scheduled to be detonated in the Castle Yankee series of tests in 1954. The tower where the bomb is hanging was based on designs from the Manhattan Project, and the Others' camp uses actual Korean War military tents.

== Reception ==
13.009 million American viewers watched the episode's premiere. In Australia, the episode brought in 465,000 viewers, ranking 29th for the night. Chris Carabott of IGN gave the episode a positive review, saying "almost every scene in this episode contained some sort of surprise, development or unexpected twist" and praising the use of time travel. Noel Murray of The A.V. Club graded the episode an A−, stating "'Jughead' went a lot more smoothly, because it was anchored to the one relationship on this show that has real gravitas: Desmond and Penny. I firmly believe that Desmond wants to keep Penny safe, and that any choices he makes to the contrary are made with great reluctance, and only because he’s answering to a higher calling. Desmond can talk about duty and time travel and be credible in a way most other Lost characters never can. And when Desmond’s providing the connective tissue in an episode as tightly plotted and straightforward as 'Jughead,' it helps a great deal."
