= Mark 16 nuclear bomb =

American hydrogen bomb design

The Mark 16 nuclear bomb was a large American thermonuclear bomb (hydrogen bomb), based on the design of the Ivy Mike, the first thermonuclear device ever test fired. The Mark 16 is more properly designated TX-16/EC-16 as it only existed in Experimental/Emergency Capability (EC) versions. The TX-16 was the only deployed thermonuclear bomb which used a cryogenic liquid deuterium fusion fuel, the same fuel used in the Ivy Mike test device, and required an elaborate cryogenic system for use. A small number of EC-16s were produced to provide a stop-gap thermonuclear weapon capability without being tested. The TX-16 was scheduled to be tested as the Castle Yankee "Jughead" device until the overwhelming success of the Castle Bravo "Shrimp" test device, which showed that "dry" lithium deuteride fusion fuel could be very productively used for thermonuclear weapons, rendered it obsolete.

== Specifications ==
The TX-16 bomb was 5 ft 1.4 in (1.56 m) in diameter, 24 ft 8.7 in (7.54 m) in length, and weighed 39,000 to 42,000 lb (17,690 to 19,050 kg). Design yield was 6-8 megatons of TNT.

== Manufacture and service ==
The TX-16 was a weaponized version of the Ivy Mike "Sausage" device. As the "Sausage" was meant to be a proof of concept, and not a deployable weapon, this required both a considerable reduction in weight of the explosive package and the replacement of the elaborate cryogenic system with vacuum flasks for replenishing boiled-off deuterium. The B-36 and B-47 were selected as carriers that would be modified for TX-16 deployment under Operation Barroom; only one B-36 was so modified.

A TX-16 Panel was created at in mid-January 1953 to study the logistics of the weapon, with representatives from Los Alamos National Laboratory, Sandia National Laboratory, and the Air Force Special Weapons Center. Wind-tunnel studies of the weapon ballistic casing were completed by October 1953. A parachute was used to guarantee that a bomber would be able to get to a safe distance before the weapon detonated. The first drop test of a TX-16 system was on December 7, 1953, at Salton Sea Test Base. Later drop tests continued there and at Edwards Air Force Base, and were ended on April 13, 1954. Sandia, who was in charge of designing the afterbody, fuze (barometric fuze), parachute, and power supply, released its components on April 15, with the provision that the weapon was usable only as an airburst, with the hope that later a proximity fuze might be developed for a near-surface burst.

The TX-16 shared common forward and aft casing sections with the TX-14 and TX-17/24 and in the emergency capability (EC-16) version was almost indistinguishable from the EC-14.

Five units were manufactured in January 1954, and deployed in an interim "emergency capability" role with the designation EC-16. In this context, "emergency capability" was understood as to mean that the system would require trained scientists and engineers to use, and would "thus be in a state corresponding to the Little Boy and Fat Man bombs at their time of use in World War II."

By April 1954, all EC-16 units were retired, as alternative solid-fueled thermonuclear weapons had been tested successfully at Operation Castle. These solid-fuel thermonuclear bombs were far easier to handle, requiring no cryogenic temperature materials or cooling system. It was replaced with the five EC-14 weapons brought up to an acceptable standard as the TX-14 and production Mark 17 nuclear bombs in mid-1954.

== See also ==
- List of nuclear weapons
