= Operation Castle =

Series of 1950s US nuclear tests

- Shot Bravo, 15 megatons, the most powerful US nuclear test ever conducted

Information
- Country: United States
- Test site: Ebiriru (Ruby), Enewetak Atoll; Elugelab (Flora), Enewetak Atoll; Eninmen (Tare), Bikini Atoll; Namu (Charlie), Bikini Atoll; Yurochi aka Irioj (Dog), Bikini Atoll
- Period: 1954
- Number of tests: 6
- Test type: barge, dry surface
- Max. yield: 15 megatonnes of TNT (63 PJ)

Test series chronology

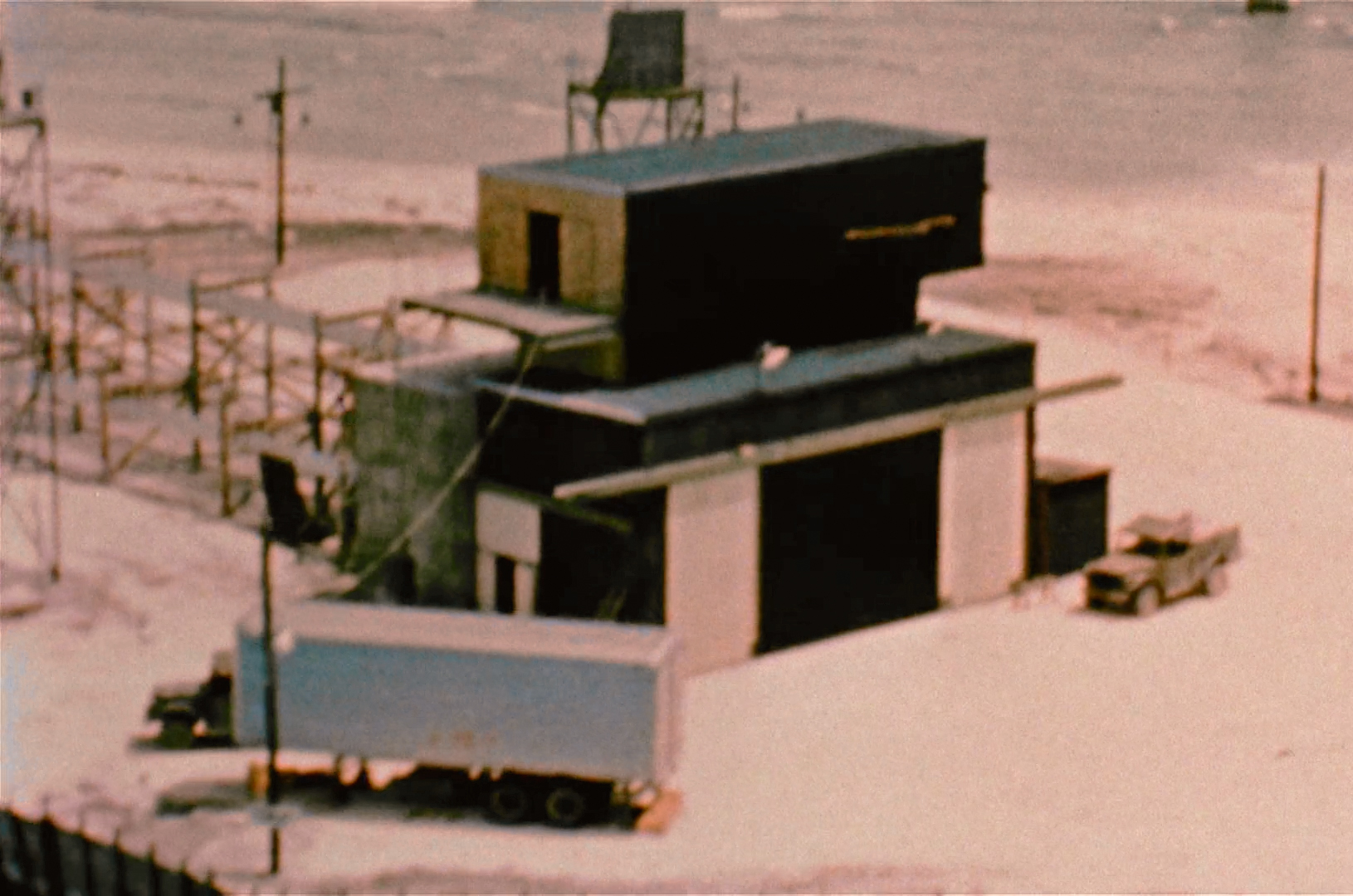
Bravo SHRIMP device shot cab

Operation Castle was a United States series of high-yield (high-energy) nuclear tests by Joint Task Force 7 (JTF-7) at Bikini Atoll beginning in March 1954. It followed Operation Upshot–Knothole and preceded Operation Teapot.

Conducted as a joint venture between the Atomic Energy Commission (AEC) and the Department of Defense (DoD), the ultimate objective of the operation was to test designs for an aircraft-deliverable thermonuclear weapon. All the devices tested, which ranged in weight from 6,520 to 39,600 pounds (2,960 to 17,960 kg), were built to be dropped from aircraft. However, ballistic casings, fins and fusing systems would have to be attached.

Operation Castle was considered by government officials to be a success as it proved the feasibility of deployable "dry" fuel designs for thermonuclear weapons. There were technical difficulties with some of the tests: one device had a yield much lower than predicted (a "fizzle"), while two other bombs detonated with over twice their predicted yields. One test in particular, Bravo, resulted in extensive radiological contamination. The fallout affected nearby islands, including inhabitants and U.S. soldiers stationed there, as well as a nearby Japanese fishing boat (the Daigo Fukuryū Maru), resulting in one direct fatality and continued health problems for many of those exposed. Public reaction to the tests and an awareness of the long-range effects of nuclear fallout has been attributed as being part of the motivation for the Partial Test Ban Treaty of 1963.

== Background ==
Bikini Atoll had previously hosted nuclear testing in 1946 as part of Operation Crossroads where the world's fourth and fifth atomic weapons were detonated in Bikini Lagoon. Since then, American nuclear weapons testing had moved to the Enewetak Atoll to take advantage of generally larger islands and deeper water. Both atolls were part of the American Pacific Proving Grounds.

The extremely high yields of the Castle weapons caused concern within the AEC that potential damage to the limited infrastructure already established at Enewetak would delay other operations. Additionally, the cratering from the Castle weapons was expected to be comparable to that of Ivy Mike, a 10.4 megatons of TNT (Mt) device tested at Enewetak in 1952 leaving a crater approximately 1 mile (1.6 km) in diameter marking the location of the obliterated test island Elugelab.

The Ivy Mike test was the world's first "hydrogen bomb", producing a full-scale thermonuclear or fusion explosion. The Ivy Mike device used liquid deuterium, an isotope of hydrogen, making it a "wet" bomb. The complex dewar mechanisms needed to store the liquid deuterium at cryogenic temperatures made the device three stories tall and 82 tons in total weight, far too heavy and bulky to be a usable weapon. With the success of Ivy Mike as proof of the Teller-Ulam bomb concept, research began on using a "dry" fuel to make a practical fusion weapon so that the United States could begin production and deployment of thermonuclear weapons in quantity. The final result incorporated lithium deuteride as the fusion fuel in the Teller-Ulam design, vastly reducing size and weight and simplifying the overall design. Operation Castle was charted to test four dry fuel designs, two wet bombs, and one smaller device. The approval for Operation Castle was issued to JTF-7 by Major General Kenneth D. Nichols, the General Manager of the AEC, on 21 January 1954.

== Experiments ==
Operation Castle was organized into seven experiments, all but one of which were to take place at Bikini Atoll. Below is the original test schedule (as of February 1954).

Operation Castle Schedule, 1954
| Experiment | Device | Prototype | Fuel | Date | Predicted yield | Manufacturer | Test location |
|---|---|---|---|---|---|---|---|
| Bravo | Shrimp | TX-21 | 40% ^{6}Li D (dry) | 1 March | 6.0 Mt | Los Alamos Scientific Laboratory | Reef off Nam Is, Bikini |
| Union | Alarm Clock | EC-14 | 95% ^{6}Li D (dry) | 11 March | 3.0 to 4.0 Mt | Los Alamos Scientific Laboratory | Barge off Iroij, Bikini |
| Yankee | Jughead / Runt-II | TX/EC-16 / TX/EC-24 | Cryo D_{2} (wet) / 40% ^{6}Li D (dry) | 22 March | 8.0 Mt | Los Alamos Scientific Laboratory | Barge off Iroij, Bikini |
| Echo | Ramrod | TX-22 | Cryo D_{2} (wet) | 29 March | 65–275 kt | University of California Radiation Laboratory (Livermore) | Eberiru, Enewetak |
| Nectar | Zombie | TX-15 | Dry | 5 April | 1.8 Mt | Los Alamos Scientific Laboratory | Barge in MIKE crater, Enewetak |
| Romeo | Runt | TX/EC-17A | 7.5% ^{6}Li deuteride (natural) | 15 April | 4.0 Mt | Los Alamos Scientific Laboratory | Barge off Iroij, Bikini |
| Koon | Morgenstern | TX-22 | 7.6% ^{6}Li deuteride (natural) | 22 April | 1.0 Mt | University of California Radiation Laboratory (Livermore) | Eneman, Bikini |

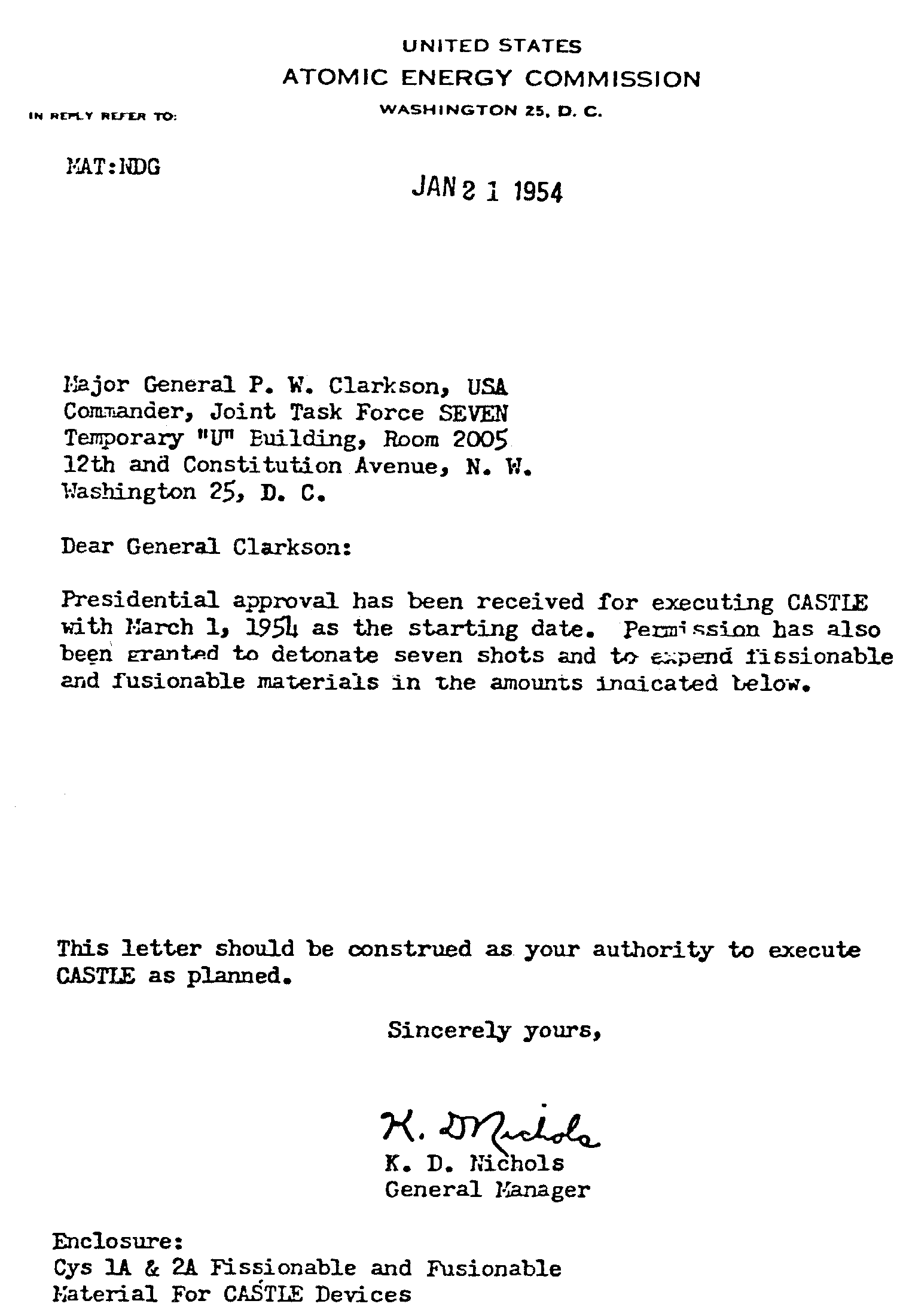
AEC Authorization for Operation Castle

The Echo test was canceled due to the liquid fuel design becoming obsolete with the success of dry-fueled Bravo as noted above. Yankee was similarly considered obsolete, and the Jughead device was replaced with a "Runt II" device (similar to the Union device), which was hastily completed at Los Alamos and flown to Bikini. With this revision, both of the wet fuel devices were removed from the test schedule.

Operation Castle was intended to test lithium deuteride (LiD) as a thermonuclear fusion fuel. A solid at room temperature, LiD, if it worked, would be far more practical than the cryogenic liquid deuterium fuel in the Ivy Mike device. The same Teller-Ulam principle would be used as in the Ivy Mike so-called "Sausage" device, but the fusion reactions were different. Ivy Mike fused deuterium with deuterium, but the LiD devices would fuse deuterium with tritium. The tritium was produced during the explosion by irradiating the lithium with fast neutrons.

Bravo, Yankee (II), and Union used lithium enriched in the ^{6}Li isotope (Bravo and Yankee used lithium enriched to 40% ^{6}Li, while the lithium used in Union was enriched to 95% ^{6}Li), while Romeo and Koon were fueled with natural lithium (92% ^{7}Li, 7.5% ^{6}Li). The use of natural lithium would be important to the ability of the US to rapidly expand its nuclear stockpile during the Cold War nuclear arms race since the so-called "Alloy Development Plants" were in an early stage at the time Castle was carried out. The first plant started production in late 1953.

As a hedge, the development of liquid deuterium weapons continued in parallel. Even though they were much less practical because of the logistical problems dealing with the transport, handling, and storage of a cryogenic device, the Cold War arms race drove the demand for a viable fusion weapon. The "Ramrod" and "Jughead" devices were liquid fuel designs greatly reduced in size and weight from their so-called "Sausage" predecessor. The "Jughead" device was eventually weaponized, and it saw limited fielding by the U.S. Air Force until the "dry" fuel H-bombs became common.

Nectar was not a fusion weapon in the same sense as the rest of the Castle series. Even though it used lithium fuel for fission boosting, the principal reaction material in the second stage was uranium and plutonium. Similar to the Teller-Ulam configuration, a nuclear fission explosion was used to create high temperatures and pressures to compress a second fissionable mass. This would have otherwise been too large to sustain an efficient reaction if it were triggered with conventional explosives. This experiment was intended to develop intermediate yield weapons for expanding the inventory (around 1-2 Mt vs. 4-8).

Many fusion or thermonuclear weapons generate much, or even most, of their yields from fission. Although the ^{238}U isotope of uranium will not sustain a chain reaction, it still fissions when irradiated by the intense fast neutron flux of a fusion explosion. Because ^{238}U is plentiful and has no critical mass, it can be added in (in theory) almost unlimited quantities as a tamper around a fusion bomb, helping contain the fusion reaction and contributing its own fission energy. For example, the fast-fission of the ^{238}U tamper contributed 77% (8.0 megatons) to the yield of the 10.4 Mt Ivy Mike explosion.

== Test execution ==
The most notable event of Operation Castle was the Castle Bravo test. The dry fuel for Bravo was 40% ^{6}Li and 60% ^{7}Li. Only the ^{6}Li was expected to breed tritium for the deuterium-tritium fusion reaction; the ^{7}Li was expected to be inert. Yet J. Carson Mark, the head of the Los Alamos Theoretical Design Division, had speculated that Bravo could "go big", estimating that the device could produce an explosive yield as much as 20% more than had been originally calculated. It was discovered, because of the unexpected larger yield, that when bombarded by high-energy neutrons the ^{7}Li in the device also undergoes breeding that produces tritium. In practice, Bravo exceeded expectations by 150%, yielding 15 Mt — about 1,000 times more powerful than the Little Boy weapon used on Hiroshima. Castle Bravo remains, to this day, the largest detonation ever carried out anywhere by the United States and the fifth largest H-bomb detonation in history.

Because Castle Bravo greatly exceeded its expected yield, JTF-7 was caught unprepared. Much of the permanent infrastructure on Bikini Atoll was heavily damaged. The intense thermal flash ignited a fire at a distance of 20 nautical miles (37 km) on the island of Eneu (base island of Bikini Atoll). The ensuing fallout contaminated all of the atoll, so much so that it could not be approached by JTF-7 for 24 hours after the test, and even then, exposure times were limited. As the fallout spread downwind to the east, more atolls were contaminated by radioactive calcium ash from the incinerated underwater coral banks. Although the atolls were evacuated soon after the test, 239 Marshallese on the Utirik, Rongelap, and Ailinginae Atolls were subjected to significant levels of radiation. 28 Americans stationed on the Rongerik Atoll were also exposed. Follow-up studies of the contaminated individuals began soon after the blast as Project 4.1, and though the short-term effects of the radiation exposure for most of the Marshallese were mild and/or hard to correlate, the long-term effects were pronounced. Additionally, 23 Japanese fishermen aboard Daigo Fukuryū Maru were also exposed to high levels of radiation. They suffered symptoms of radiation poisoning, and one crew member died in September 1954.

The heavy contamination and extensive damage from Bravo delayed the rest of the series. A revised test schedule was officially released on 14 April 1954. The Castle Romeo and Koon tests were complete by the time this revision was published.

Operation Castle schedule (Post Bravo) for 1954
| Experiment | Original date | Revised date | Original yield | Revised yield |
|---|---|---|---|---|
| Union | 11 March | 22 April | 3-4 Mt | 5-10 Mt |
| Yankee | 22 March | 27 April | 8.0 Mt | 9.5 Mt |
| Nectar | 5 April | 20 April | 1.8 Mt | 1.0 to 3.0 Mt |
| Romeo | 15 April | 27 March | 4.0 Mt | 8.0 Mt |
| Koon | 22 April | 7 April | 1.0 Mt | 1.5 Mt |

Castle-Union, 6.9 megatons.

Castle-Yankee, 13.6 megatons

Castle-Romeo, 11 megatons.

As Operation Castle progressed, the increased yields and fallout caused test locations to be reevaluated. While the majority of the tests were planned for barges near the sand spit of Iroij, some were moved to the craters of Bravo and Union. In addition, Castle Nectar was moved from Bikini Atoll to the crater of Ivy Mike at Eniwetok for expediency, since Bikini was still heavily contaminated from the previous tests.

The final test in Operation Castle took place on 14 May 1954.

== Results ==
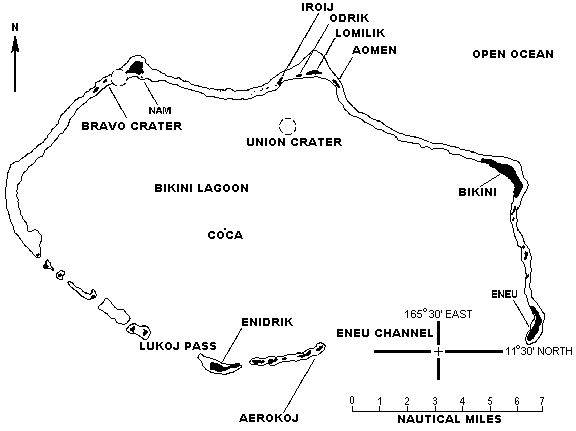
Bikini Atoll in the summer 1954 after the completion of Operation Castle

Operation Castle was an unqualified success for the implementation of dry fuel devices. The Bravo design was quickly weaponized and is suspected to be the progenitor of the Mk-21 gravity bomb. The Mk-21 design project began on 26 March 1954 (just three weeks after Bravo), with production of 275 weapons beginning in late 1955. Romeo, relying on natural lithium, was rapidly turned into the Mk-17 bomb, the first deployable US thermonuclear weapon, and was available to strategic forces as an Emergency Capability weapon by mid-1954. Most of the Castle dry fuel devices eventually appeared in the inventory and ultimately grandfathered the majority of thermonuclear configurations.

In contrast, the Livermore-designed Koon was a failure. Using natural lithium and a heavily modified Teller-Ulam configuration, the test produced only 110 kilotons of an expected 1.5 megaton yield. While engineers at the Radiation Laboratory had hoped it would lead to a promising new field of weapons, it was eventually determined that the design allowed premature heating of the lithium fuel, thereby disrupting the delicate fusion conditions.

== Video ==
De-classified military effects-studies of Operation Castle, 1954

== List ==
United States' Castle series tests and detonations in 1954
| Name (Note: The United States, France, and Great Britain have code-named their test events, while the USSR and China did not, and therefore have only test numbers (with some exceptions – Soviet peaceful explosions were named). Word translations into English in parentheses unless the name is a proper noun. A dash followed by a number indicates a member of a salvo event. The United States also sometimes named the individual explosions in such a salvo test, which results in "name1 – 1(with name2)". If test is canceled or aborted, then the row data like date and location discloses the intended plans, where known.) | Date time (UT) | Local time zone (Note: To convert the UT time into standard local, add the number of hours in parentheses to the UT time; for local daylight saving time, add one additional hour. If the result is earlier than 00:00, add 24 hours and subtract 1 from the day; if it is 24:00 or later, subtract 24 hours and add 1 to the day. Historical time zone data obtained from the IANA time zone database.) | Location (Note: Rough place name and a latitude/longitude reference; for rocket-carried tests, the launch location is specified before the detonation location, if known. Some locations are extremely accurate; others (like airdrops and space blasts) may be quite inaccurate. "~" indicates a likely pro-forma rough location, shared with other tests in that same area.) | Elevation + height (Note: Elevation is the ground level at the point directly below the explosion relative to sea level; height is the additional distance added or subtracted by tower, balloon, shaft, tunnel, air drop or other contrivance. For rocket bursts the ground level is "N/A". In some cases it is not clear if the height is absolute or relative to ground, for example, Plumbbob/John. No number or units indicates the value is unknown, while "0" means zero. Sorting on this column is by elevation and height added together.) | Delivery, (Note: Atmospheric, airdrop, balloon, gun, cruise missile, rocket, surface, tower, and barge are all disallowed by the Partial Nuclear Test Ban Treaty. Sealed shaft and tunnel are underground, and remained useful under the PTBT. Intentional cratering tests are borderline; they occurred under the treaty, were sometimes protested, and generally overlooked if the test was declared to be a peaceful use.) purpose (Note: Include weapons development, weapon effects, safety test, transport safety test, war, science, joint verification and industrial/peaceful, which may be further broken down.) | Device (Note: Designations for test items where known, "?" indicates some uncertainty about the preceding value, nicknames for particular devices in quotes. This category of information is often not officially disclosed.) | Yield (Note: Estimated energy yield in tons, kilotons, and megatons. A ton of TNT equivalent is defined as 4.184 gigajoules (1 gigacalorie).) | Fallout (Note: Radioactive emission to the atmosphere aside from prompt neutrons, where known. The measured species is only iodine-131 if mentioned, otherwise it is all species. No entry means unknown, probably none if underground and "all" if not; otherwise notation for whether measured on the site only or off the site, where known, and the measured amount of radioactivity released.) | References | Notes |
|---|---|---|---|---|---|---|---|---|---|---|
| Bravo | February 28, 1954 18:45:00.0 | MHT (11 hrs) | Namu (Charlie), Bikini Atoll 11.6972°N 165.2749°E | 2 m (6 ft 7 in) + 2 m (6 ft 7 in) | dry surface, weapons development | TX-21 "Shrimp" | 15 Mt | | | Used a RACER IV primary. Over twice as powerful as predicted, error in assessing ^{7}Li. Lethal fallout, killed radioman on Japanese vessel Daigo Fukuryu Maru (Fifth Lucky Dragon); 1 fatality, 93+ injured. Design used in Mk-21/36. Largest US atmospheric detonation. |
| Romeo | March 26, 1954 18:30:00.4 | MHT (11 hrs) | Yurochi aka Irioj (Dog), Bikini Atoll 11.6943°N 165.2652°E | 0 + 4.3 m (14 ft) | barge, weapons development | TX/EC-17A "Runt" | 11 Mt | | | Exceeded yield expectations, by almost a factor of 3. Proof test of the Mk-17, deployed as the EC-17. |
| Echo (canceled) | March 29, 1954 | MHT (11 hrs) | Ebiriru (Ruby), Enewetak Atoll 11.6199°N 162.2940°E | 3 m (9.8 ft) + | barge, weapons development | Cryo design "ramrod" | N/A | | | Scheduled for Castle but not executed, location and time are as planned. It was canceled when the Bravo test was so unexpectedly successful, making cryogenic thermonuclear concepts obsolete. |
| Koon | April 6, 1954 18:20:00.4 | MHT (11 hrs) | Eninmen (Tare), Bikini Atoll 11.5038°N 165.3685°E | 2 m (6 ft 7 in) + 1 m (3 ft 3 in) | dry surface, weapons development | "Morgenstern" | 110 kt | | | UCRL design, last one that Teller worked on, secondary delayed too long, and fizzled at 110 kt yield. |
| Union | April 25, 1954 18:10:00.6 | MHT (11 hrs) | Yurochi aka Irioj (Dog), Bikini Atoll 11.6664°N 165.3872°E | 0 + 4 m (13 ft) | barge, weapons development | TX-14 w/ RACER IV "Alarm Clock" | 6.9 Mt | | | Prototype EC-14, used expensive 95% enriched ^{6}Li fuel, RACER IV primary. |
| Yankee 2 | May 4, 1954 18:10:00.1 | MHT (11 hrs) | Yurochi aka Irioj (Dog), Bikini Atoll 11.6656°N 165.3869°E | 0 + 4.3 m (14 ft) | barge, weapons development | TX/EC-24 RACER IV "Runt II" | 13.5 Mt | | | Proof test of TX/EC-24 with a RACER IV primary. After Bravo's success, the wet/dry TX/EC-16 Jughead device that was to be tested was discarded for the Runt2 dry device, hence the "2" designation. |
| Nectar | May 13, 1954 18:20:00.1 | MHT (11 hrs) | Elugelab (Flora), Enewetak Atoll 11.6705°N 162.1964°E | 0 + 4.3 m (14 ft) | barge, weapons development | TX-15 COBRA "Zombie" | 1.7 Mt | | | Originally intended to have no thermonuclear fuel used, as Ulam and Teller designed, but Los Alamos ultimately decided to include deuterium within the secondary. Only test in Castle series to have a correctly predicted yield. |

== Gallery ==
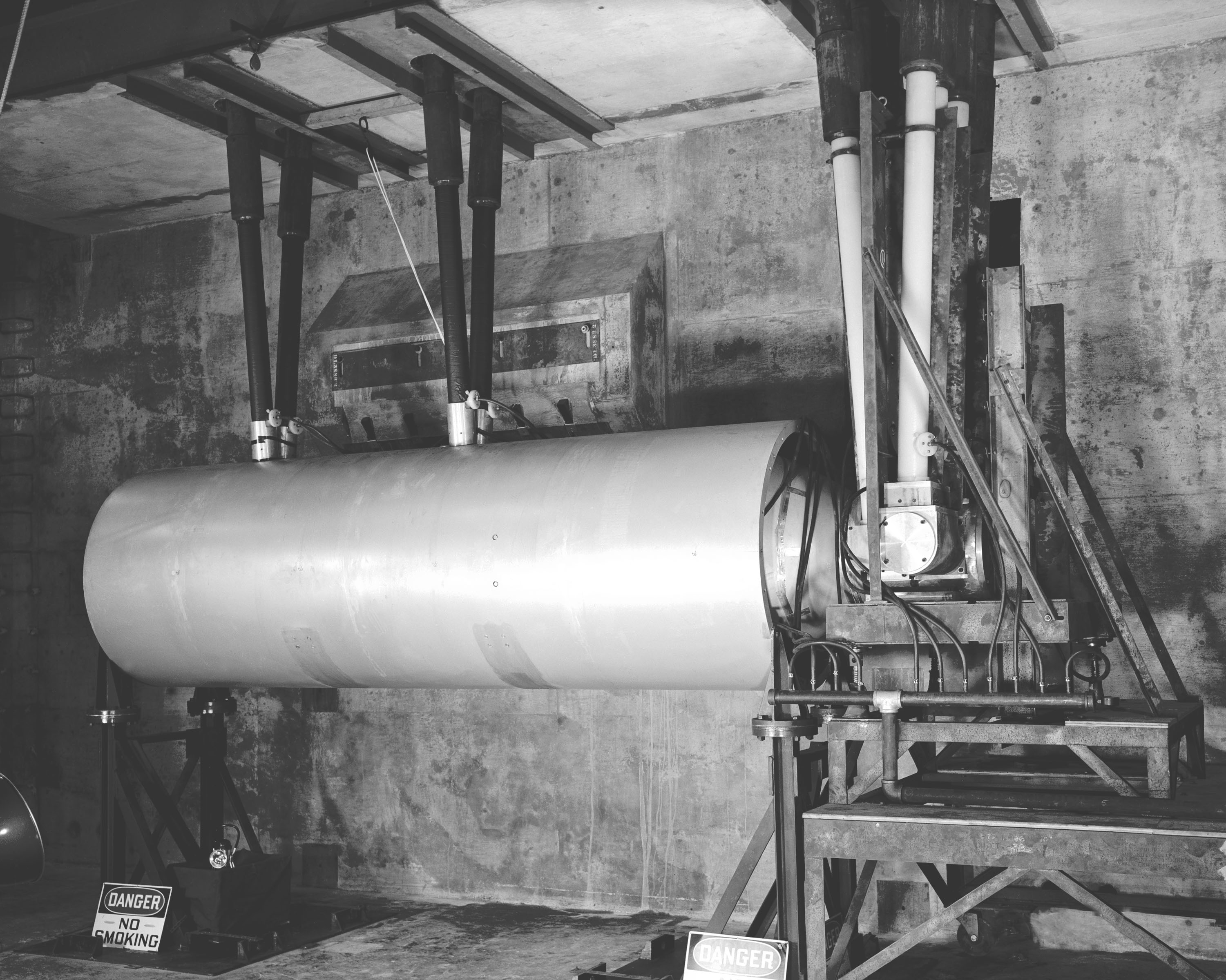
Shrimp (Bravo) device in its shot cab

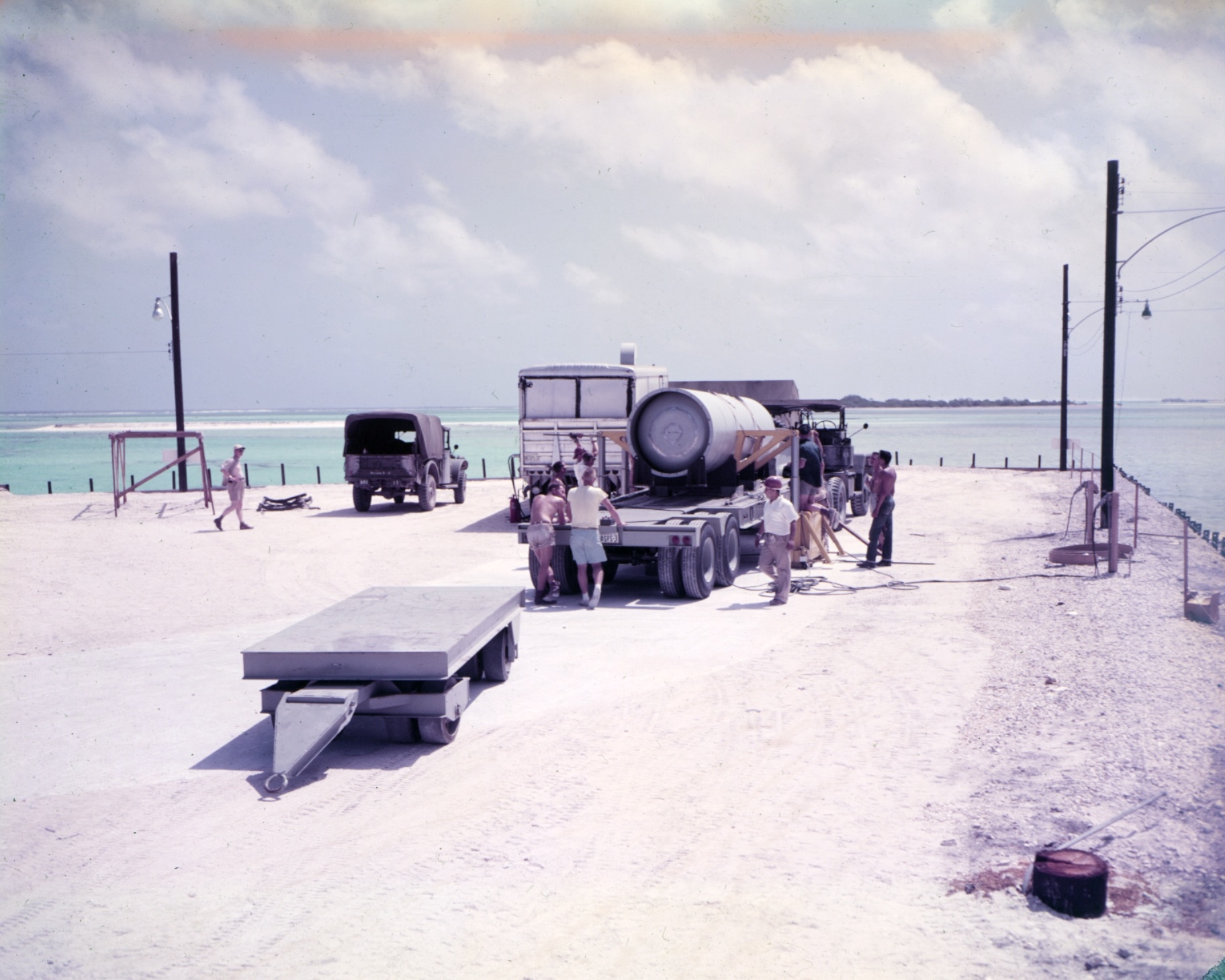
Shrimp (Bravo) device being unloaded from a truck

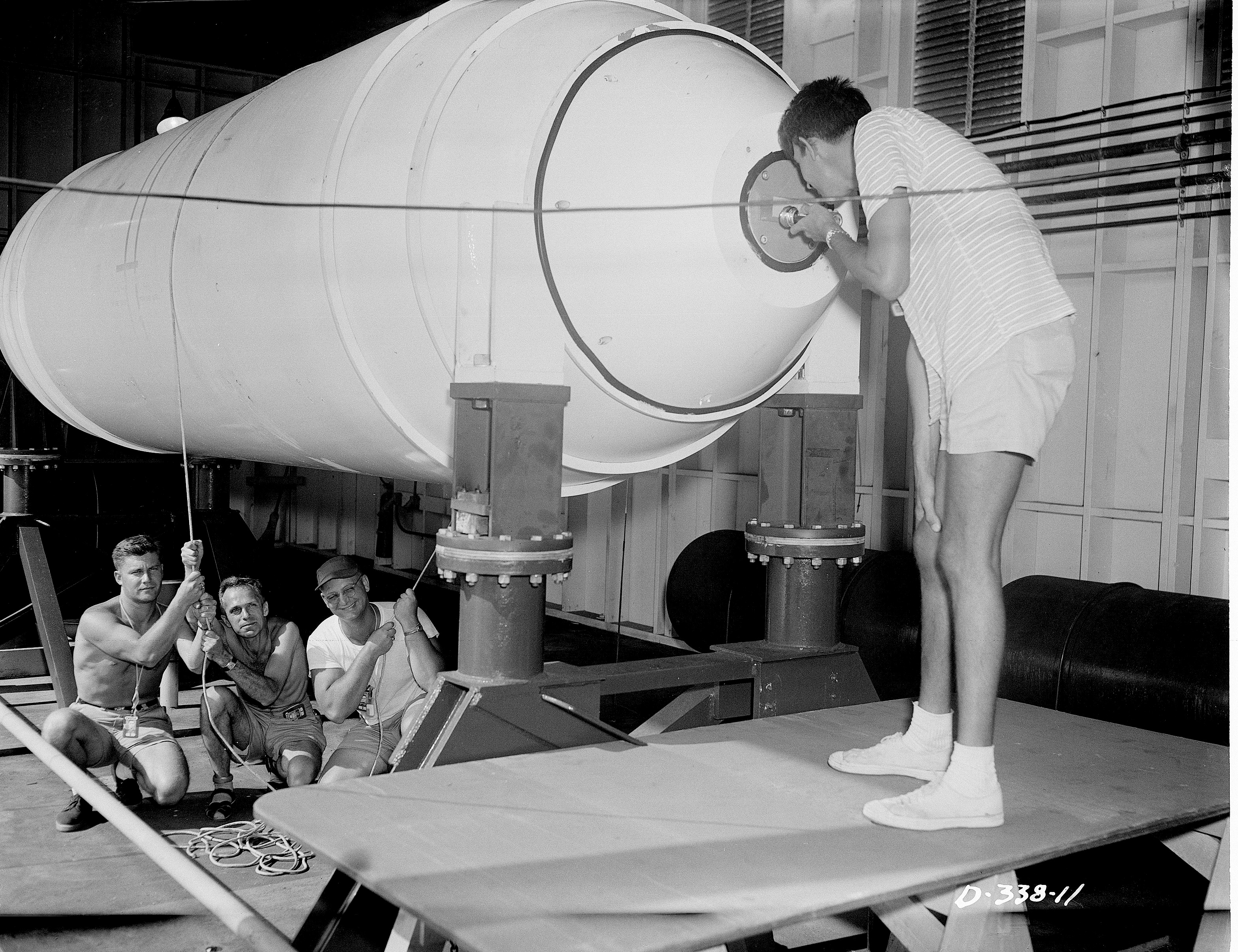
Unknown device tested in Castle. The device may be Runt (Romeo) or Runt II (Yankee).

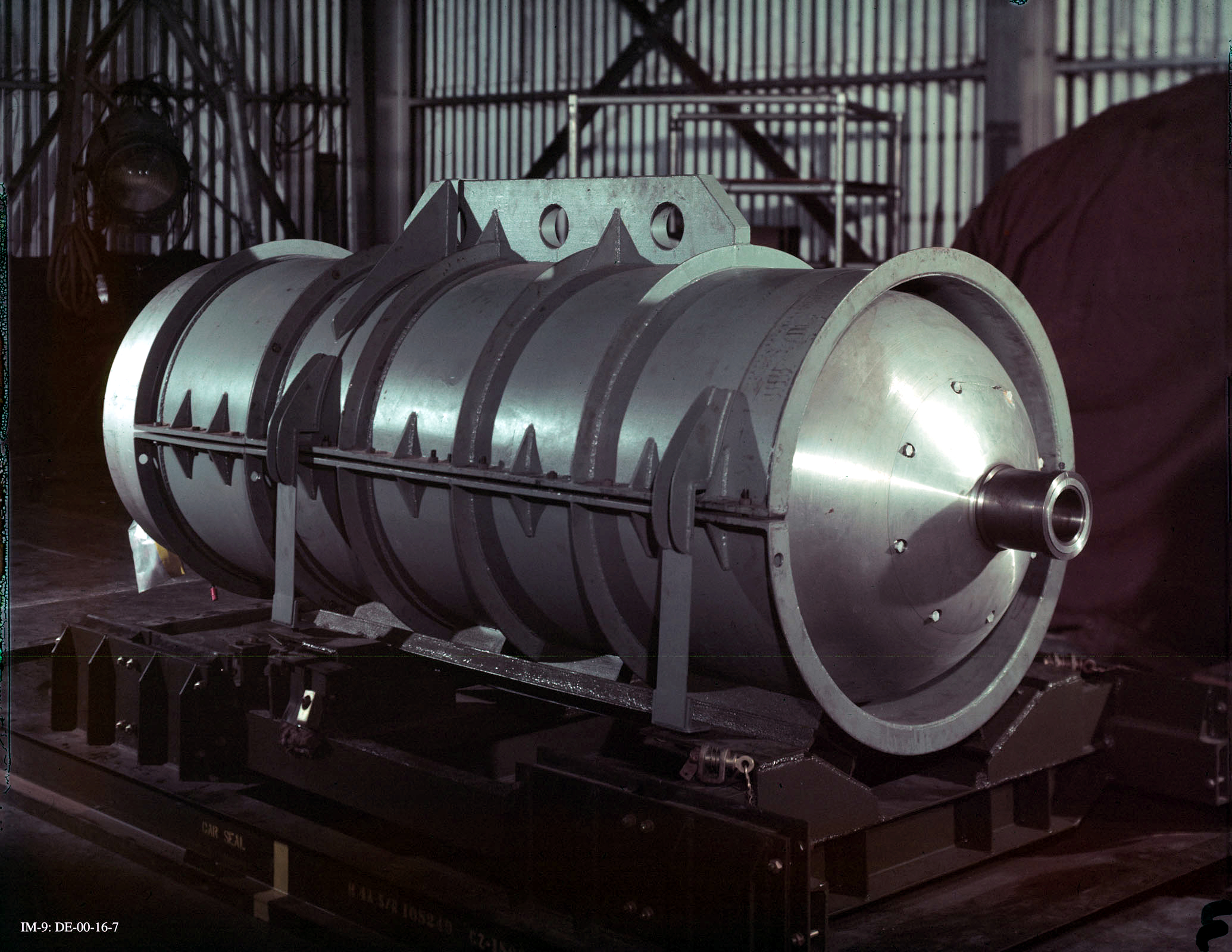
Unknown device, may be Morgenstern (Koon).

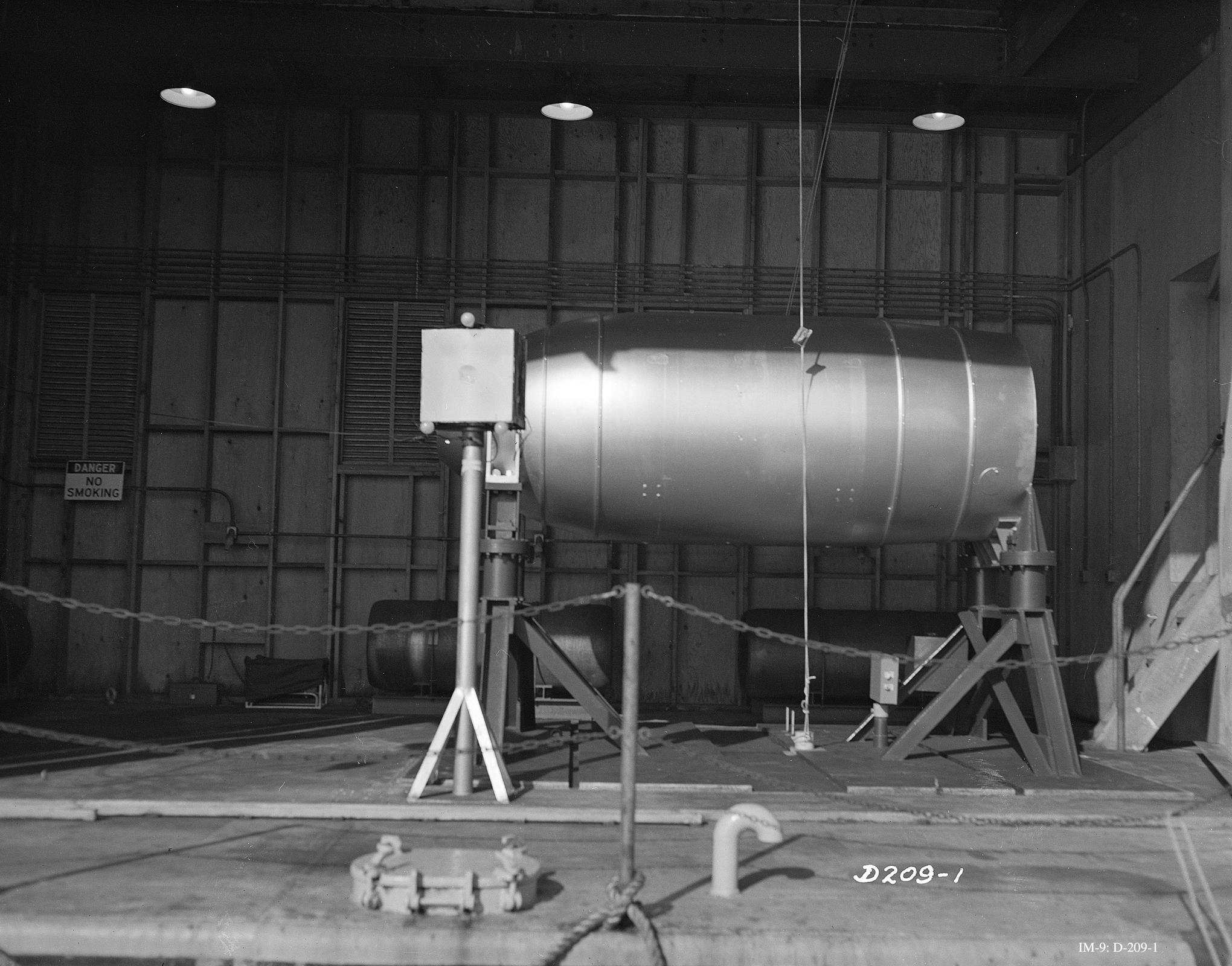
Unknown device, may be Alarm Clock (Union).

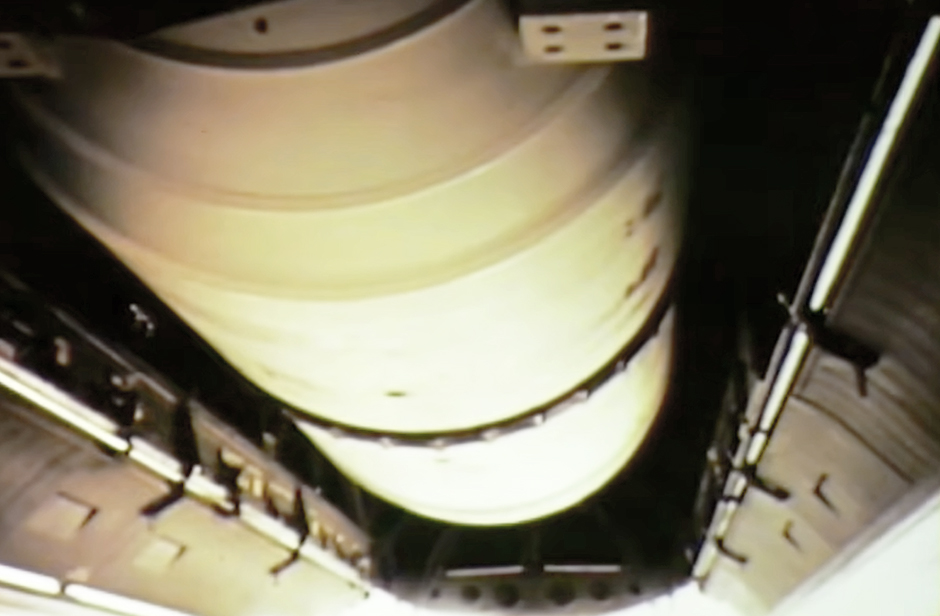
B-36 delivery of testing device for Castle, 16th April. Unknown device; possibly Runt II (Yankee).

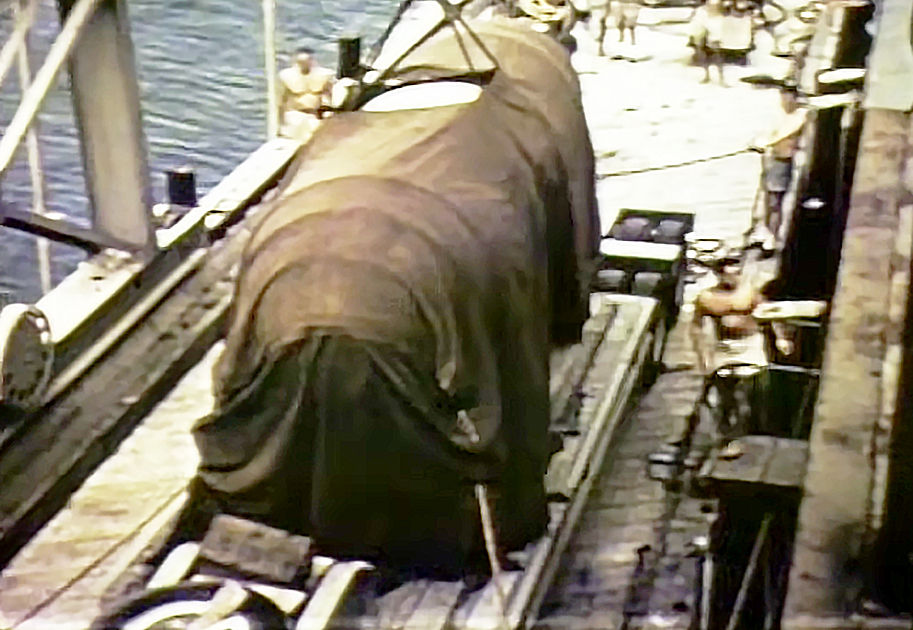
Barge transport for testing device of Castle. Unknown device; possibly Runt II (Yankee).

== See also ==
- Katsuko Saruhashi
- Operation Redwing
