= Mark 36 nuclear bomb =

US thermonuclear bomb designed in the 1950s

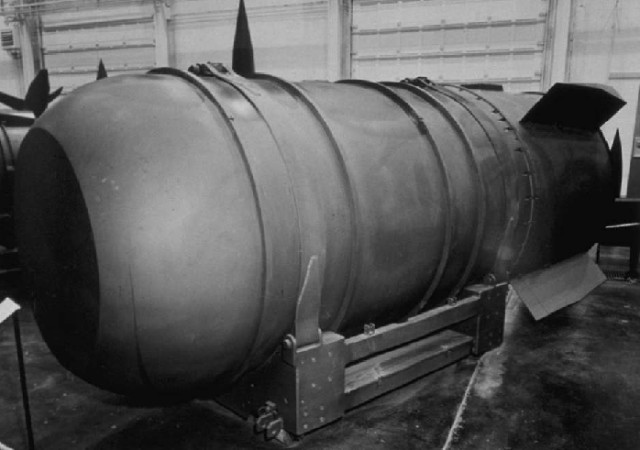
The Mark 36 nuclear bomb

The Mk 36 was a heavy, high-yield nuclear bomb developed by the United States during the 1950s. It was a thermonuclear weapon, using a multi-stage fusion secondary system to generate yields up to about 10 megatons TNT equivalent.

== History ==
The Mark 36 was a more advanced version of the earlier Mark 21 nuclear bomb, which was a weaponized version of the "Shrimp" design, the first "dry" (lithium deuteride) fueled thermonuclear bomb test, which was conducted by the United States in the Castle Bravo thermonuclear test in 1954.

The Mark 21 bomb was developed and deployed in 1955, immediately after Castle Bravo. The Mark 21 design continued to be improved and the Mark 36 device started production in April 1956. In 1957, all older Mark 21 bombs were converted to Mark 36 Y1 Mod 1 bombs. A total of 920 Mark 36 bombs were produced as new build or converted from the 275 Mark 21 bombs produced earlier.

All Mark 36 nuclear bombs were retired between August 1961 and January 1962, replaced by the higher-yield B41 nuclear bomb.

== Survivors ==
All surviving Mark 36 casings are located in the United States.

A Mark 36 casing is on display in the Cold War Gallery at the National Museum of the United States Air Force in Dayton, Ohio.

A Mark 36 casing can be found at the Strategic Air and Space Museum near Ashland, Nebraska.

A MK 36 can be found in the "Wings Over the Rockies" air museum in the Lowry neighborhood of Denver, Colorado.

== Specifications ==
The Mark 36 bomb was 56.2 to 59 inches (143 to 150 cm) in diameter, depending on version, and 150 inches (3.8 m) long. It weighed 17,500 or 17,700 pounds (7,900 or 8,000 kg) depending on version.

There were two major variants, conventional ("dirty") weapon designated the Y1 and a low fission fraction "clean" Y2 version. The clean variant used an inert fusion stage tamper-pusher assembly (see Teller–Ulam design) such as lead or tungsten. The "dirty" variant used a depleted uranium or U-238 tamper-pusher which would undergo fission during the second stage fusion burn, doubling the weapon yield. Chuck Hansen wrote in Swords of Armageddon (1995) that the Mark 36 was produced in two yield versions: clean and dirty. He stated that a clean version of a Mark 36 had a yield of 6 megatons while a dirty version had a maximum yield of 19 megatons.

== See also ==
- List of nuclear weapons
- Teller-Ulam design
