= Mark 21 nuclear bomb =

Mark 21
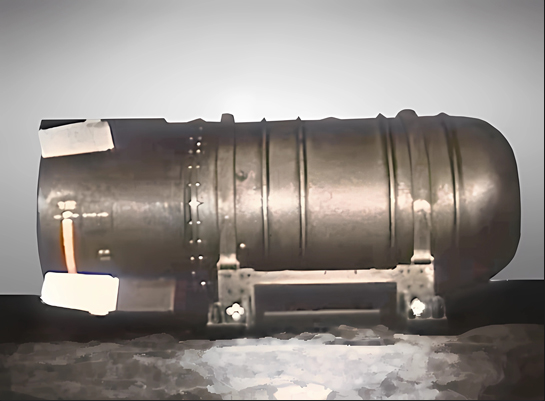
- Type: Thermonuclear weapon

Service history
- Used by: United States

Production history
- Produced: December 1955 to July 1956
- No. built: 275 weapons produced in Y1 variant.
- Variants: 2

Specifications
- Mass: 17,600 pounds (8,000 kg)
- Length: 12 feet 4.37 inches (3.7686 m)
- Diameter: 58.48 inches (148.5 cm)
- Blast yield: 18 megatons (USAF claim, although never tested).

The Mark 21 nuclear bomb was a United States thermonuclear gravity bomb first produced in 1955. It was based on the TX 21 "Shrimp" prototype that had been detonated during the Castle Bravo test in March 1954. While most of the Operation Castle tests were intended to evaluate weapons intended for immediate stockpile, or which were already available for use as part of the Emergency Capability Program, Castle Bravo was intended to test a design which would drastically reduce the size and cost of the first generation of air-droppable thermonuclear weapons (the Mk 14, Mk 17 & Mk 24).

== Design ==
At 12 feet 4.37 inches (3.77 m) long, 58.48 inches (1.49 m) in diameter, an 80.9 inches (2.05 m) span over the fins, and weighing 17,600 pounds (8,000 kg), the Mk 21 was half the length and less than half the weight of the Mk 17/24 weapons it replaced. The Mk 21 Y1 had a yield of 18 to 19 megatons. The "clean" Mk 21 Y2 (later designated Mk 26) was tested at 4.5 megatons. All 275 Mk 21 weapons stockpiled were the Y1 version.

Quantity production of the Mk 21 started in December 1955 and ran until July 1956. Starting in June 1957 all Mk 21 bombs were converted to the more advanced Mk 36, which was removed from service in 1962.

== Delivery system ==
The Mark 21 could only be delivered by bomber; it was carried by the B-36 and B-47. The weapon was carried in a sling apparatus. Aircraft speed at release was limited to 400 knots (740 km/h), so as to not exceed an opening shock of 6,000 Gs on the parachute harness. The bomb was equipped with a two-stage deployment system, including a 24 feet (7.3 m) main ribbon canopy which provided up to 108 seconds of retardation.

To carry the Mk 21, the B-47 required the installation of special fin recesses in the bomb bay doors.

== Tests ==
The Mk 21 (Mk 21 Y1, the version in the stockpile) was never tested. The Mk 21C (Mk 21 Y2) was proof tested as the Operation Redwing Navajo shot, with a yield of 4.5 megatons.

== Specifications ==
Detonation test of Castle-Bravo TX-21 "SHRIMP device; the design progenitor of the Mark 21.

- Length: 12.3 feet (3.7 m)
- Diameter: 4.8 feet (1.5 m)
- Weight: 17,600 pounds (7,983 kg)
- Fuzing: airburst—Contact burst was also available.
- Yield: 18 to 19 megatons
- Thermonuclear weapon

== Gallery ==
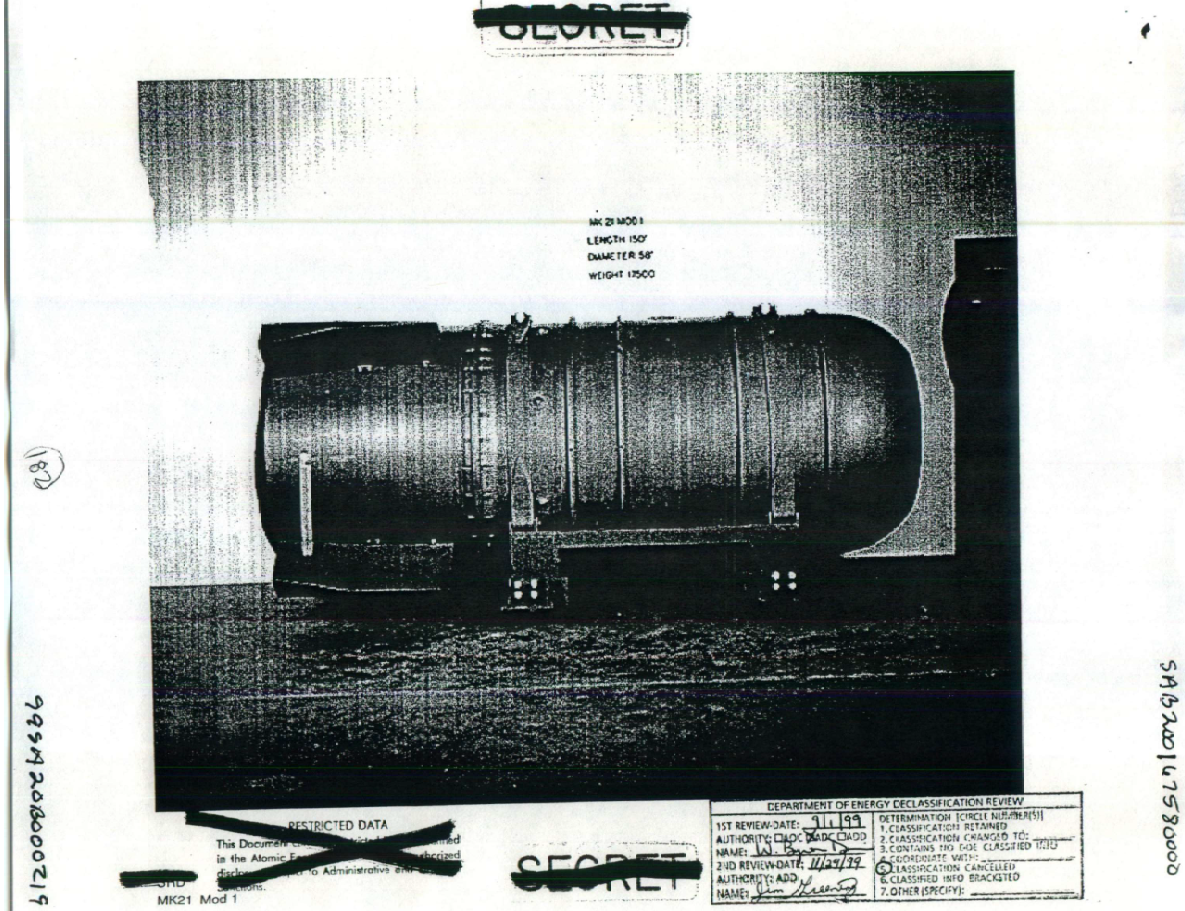

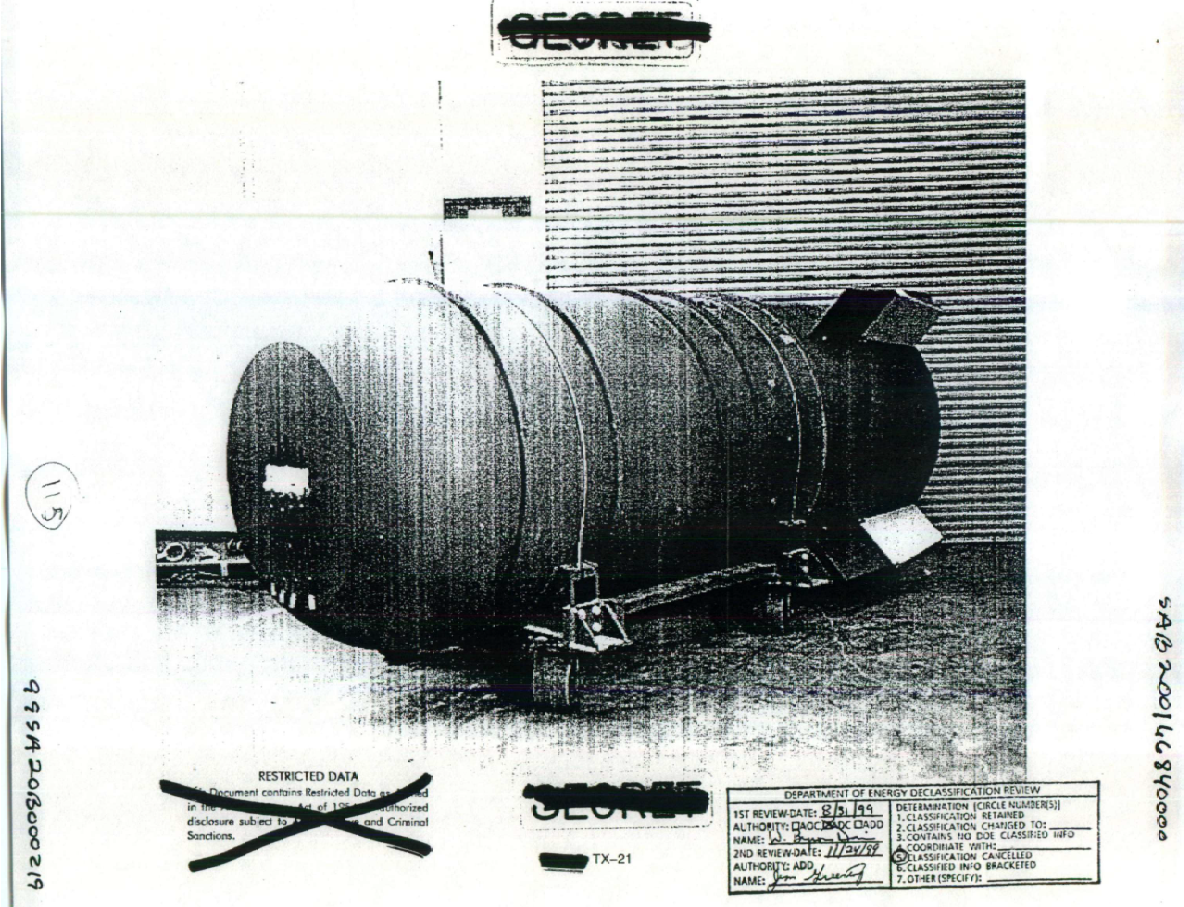

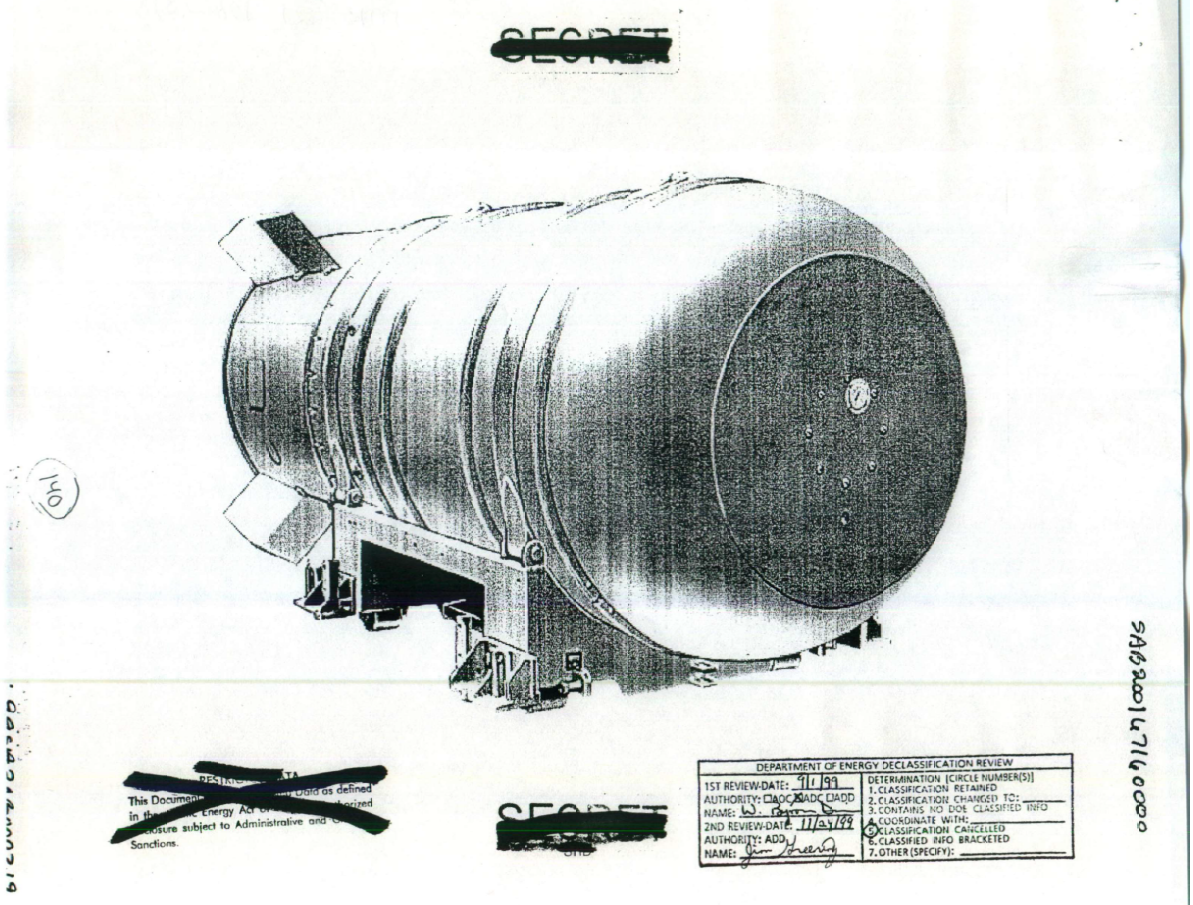

== Users ==
- United States Air Force

== See also ==
- List of nuclear weapons
