= The Lie (Lost) =

- Lost episode
- Episode no.: Season 5 Episode 2
- Directed by: Jack Bender
- Written by: Edward Kitsis; Adam Horowitz
- Production code: 502
- Original air date: January 21, 2009
- Running time: 42 minutes

Guest appearances
- Michelle Rodriguez as Ana Lucia Cortez; L. Scott Caldwell as Rose Nadler; Sam Anderson as Bernard Nadler; Sonya Walger as Penny Widmore; Jeff Fahey as Frank Lapidus; Lillian Hurst as Carmen Reyes; Cheech Marin as David Reyes; William Blanchette as Aaron; Sean Whalen as Neil "Frogurt"; Tom Connolly as Young Jones; Mary Mara as Jill; Dana Sorman as Darlene; James Jeremiah as Detective; Stephanie Conching as Nurse; Matthew Allan as Cunningham; Todd Bryant as Mattingly; Fionnula Flanagan as Ms. Hawking

Episode chronology
← Previous "Because You Left"	Next → "Jughead"
- Lost season 5

"The Lie" is the second episode of the fifth season of ABC's science fiction drama television series Lost. The 88th episode of the show overall, "The Lie" aired on January 21, 2009, on ABC in the United States, being simulcast on A in Canada. It aired immediately after the previous episode, "Because You Left", which itself was preceded by a clip-show that recapped the first four seasons. "The Lie" was written by Edward Kitsis and Adam Horowitz, who were named executive producers prior to the start of production on season five; and directed by executive producer Jack Bender.

In 2007, Hugo "Hurley" Reyes has trouble concealing the lie of the Oceanic 6. Kate Austen meets Sun-Hwa Kwon. At the island, in 1954, the survivors come under attack by a large unseen force. The episode received mainly positive reviews from critics, with IGN giving the episode 7.8 out of 10, and The A.V. Club awarded it a B+.

== Plot ==
On the island, (Note: In Jughead, it is revealed that the survivors are in the year 1954.) the remaining survivors are attempting to start a fire, when they are attacked by a barrage of flaming arrows. Some of the survivors are able to escape, but Neil "Frogurt" and a few others are killed, and James "Sawyer" Ford (Josh Holloway) and Juliet Burke (Elizabeth Mitchell) are separated from the group. Lost in the jungle, they are captured by a group of armed military men who demand to know who they are, asserting that the island is theirs. The men are about to cut off Juliet's hand to extract information, when John Locke (Terry O'Quinn) ambushes them, helping Sawyer and Juliet free themselves.

In 2007, (Note: Immediately after the events of Because You Left.) Jack Shephard (Matthew Fox) and Ben Linus (Michael Emerson) part ways, with Ben taking Locke's body to a butcher for safekeeping. Ben tells Jack to collect any personal items he really wants and meet up with him in six hours. Meanwhile, Kate Austen (Evangeline Lilly) and Aaron Littleton, her adopted son, have fled their home to escape lawyers demanding a maternity test. They meet up with Sun-Hwa Kwon (Yunjin Kim) at a hotel, who implies that Kate should take whatever measures are necessary to protect Aaron. Sun forgives Kate for leaving her husband, Jin-Soo Kwon (Daniel Dae Kim) on the freighter when it exploded. (Note: As depicted in There's No Place Like Home.)

Meanwhile, Hugo "Hurley" Reyes (Jorge Garcia) and Sayid Jarrah (Naveen Andrews) are on the run after they are attacked at their safehouse; Hurley drives the unconscious Sayid, who has been hit by two drugged darts, to his parents' house. On the way, Hurley is pulled over by deceased Oceanic Flight 815 survivor and former police officer Ana Lucia Cortez (Michelle Rodriguez), who gives him advice on how to avoid the real cops. Upon arriving home, Hurley's dad, David (Cheech Marin), covers for them when the police show up and suggests that Hurley take Sayid to the hospital. Hurley refuses, and David ends up taking Sayid to Jack, who is successful in reviving him. At home, Hurley confesses to his mother Carmen that the Oceanic Six have been lying; she believes him, though doesn't understand his disjointed story. Later, Ben unexpectedly shows up at the house and tries to convince Hurley to go with him to meet up with the rest of the Oceanic Six, saying they all want the same thing—to go back to the island. Hurley wavers for a moment, then runs outside and turns himself in to police watching the house, having been advised by Sayid to do the opposite of whatever Ben asks. Later, Ben visits the mysterious woman (Note: Later revealed to be called Eloise Hawking.) Desmond met during his time travel after he turned the hatch's key, (Note: As depicted in Flashes Before Your Eyes.) who tells him she has found the island and that Ben only has seventy hours to return to it with Locke's corpse and the Oceanic Six.

== Production ==
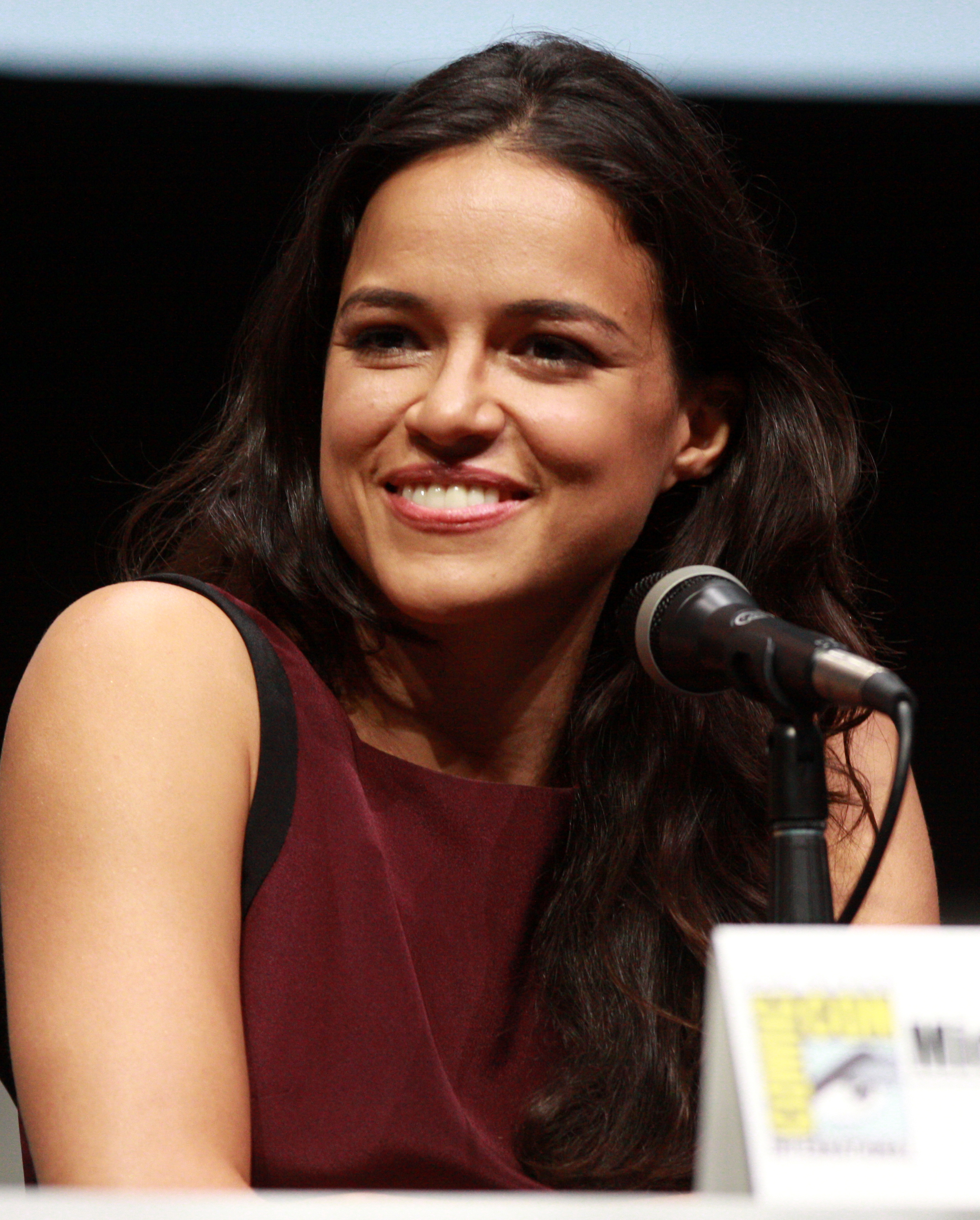
Michelle Rodriguez's appearance in the episode marked her first since the second season.

"The Lie" was written by Edward Kitsis and Adam Horowitz, who were named executive producers prior to the start of production on season five; and directed by executive producer Jack Bender.

When handing out scripts for the attack on the beach, Bender told the crew he and others "wanted this to be really big and really dramatic". They used arrows on wires to simulate hitting the fleeing victims, which included Neil Frogurt (Sean Whalen). A stunt double, Kim Koscki, was hired for the scene to stand in for Whalen; he applied anti-burn cream over his face and body for protection, and crew members waited nearby to quickly extinguish the flames once a scene was finished shooting. Due to the abundance of wires, the actors had to be careful when running, or risk tripping over them.

"The Lie" features the first appearance of main cast member Michelle Rodriguez since the second season episode "?". Rodriguez's character, Ana Lucia Cortez, was written to have a one season arc and was subsequently killed off at the end of the second season of Lost. Dressed as a police officer, Ana Lucia's "ghost" appears in "The Lie", telling Hurley to "stay away from the cops". The scene makes use of the Cheap Trick song "Dream Police".

== Reception ==
"Because You Left" and "The Lie" were uploaded to ABC's Medianet website on December 29, 2008, to be viewed by members of the press for advance reviews attached to limited confidentiality agreements. Matt Mitovich of TV Guide stated that "[t]he first hour is the stronger of the two", and that the "showstopper [is] one of Lost's most electric and intense action scenes ever." "The Lie" aired on January 21, 2009, on ABC in the United States, being simulcast on A in Canada. "The Lie", as well as the previous episode, "Because You Left" was viewed by 11.347 million in the US, and by 1.195 million in the UK. In Australia, the episode was aired separately to "Because You Left" and brought in 516,000 viewers.

IGN gave the episode a "Good" rating of 7.8 out of 10 and summarized the episode as being "a much more focused story than 'Because You Left' but in the shadow of the season premiere's revelations and grandeur it is ultimately the weaker of the two. The comedic moments that string together Hurley's journey only go so far and the rest feels a bit too much like filler... If the conclusion of 'The Lie' is any indication though, the outside world may prove to be just as strange as the island." IGN later ranked "The Lie" 84th out of the 115 Lost episodes, writing "this isn't a terrible episode, but it feels like a bit of a stop-gap, in the midst of a very cool run of episodes. On the Island, we do get to see a pretty cool looking Flaming Arrow attack, that kills the uber-annoying Frogurt, but the encounter the group has at the end with some men dressed as soldiers is just set up for the awesome "Jughead."

On a similar list, the Los Angeles Times ranked it at number 69, explaining "this isn't a bad episode. Like most Hurley episodes, it features a lot of very sweet, funny material. But it is a bit of a time killer between two really fantastic hours." The A.V. Club gave the episode a B+ rating and stated that "it's enough for me. I don't know about you, but I'm ready to get Lost again."
