= Because You Left =

- Lost episode
- Episode no.: Season 5 Episode 1
- Directed by: Stephen Williams
- Written by: Damon Lindelof; Carlton Cuse
- Production code: 501
- Original air date: January 21, 2009
- Running time: 43 minutes

Guest appearances
- L. Scott Caldwell as Rose Nadler; Sam Anderson as Bernard Nadler; Nestor Carbonell as Richard Alpert; William Mapother as Ethan Rom; François Chau as Dr. Pierre Chang; Sonya Walger as Penny Widmore; Alan Dale as Charles Widmore; William Blanchette as Aaron; Sean Whalen as Neil "Frogurt"; Tom Irwin as Dan Norton

Episode chronology
← Previous "There's No Place Like Home"	Next → "The Lie"
- Lost season 5

"Because You Left" is the first episode of the fifth season of the American Broadcasting Company's drama television series Lost. The episode is the 87th episode of the show overall, and was written by executive producers/show runners Damon Lindelof and Carlton Cuse and directed by co-executive producer Stephen Williams. It first aired on January 21, 2009, on ABC in the United States and was simulcast on A in Canada. It aired immediately after a clip-show that recaps the first four seasons and aired back-to-back with the next episode, "The Lie".

In 2007, Jack Shephard and Benjamin Linus start their quest to reunite the "Oceanic 6". Hugo "Hurley" Reyes and Sayid Jarrah are ambushed at their safehouse. Sun-Hwa Kwon is confronted by Charles Widmore. Kate Austen and Aaron Littleton flee from their home after being ordered to submit a maternity test. James "Sawyer" Ford, Daniel Faraday, Juliet Burke, Charlotte Lewis, Miles Straume, John Locke, and the other survivors of Oceanic 815 left on the island erratically travel through time upon the island's move. "Because You Left" averaged 11.347 million viewers in the United States, and received good reviews, praising the writing and the unraveling of new elements.

== Plot ==
In the late 1970s, when the Dharma Initiative has begun to build stations on the island, Dr. Pierre Chang (François Chau) begins to film the orientation film for the Arrow Station when he is informed of an incident at the construction site of the Orchid Station. Upon arriving there, he realizes that the workers have found the "unlimited" energy source that the Dharma Initiative has been looking for, which will enable them to manipulate time. As he leaves the station, he bumps into Daniel Faraday (Jeremy Davies), who is dressed as a Dharma construction worker.

After the island is moved on December 30, 2004, (Note: As depicted in There's No Place Like Home.) the survivors of Oceanic Flight 815, the freighter team, and Juliet Burke (Elizabeth Mitchell) begin to erratically jump through time – something Faraday likens to standing on a skipping record – while the Others are unaffected. The first jump takes them to the day when the Beechcraft carrying Mr. Eko's brother crashes onto the island. John Locke is shot in the leg by Ethan Rom (William Mapother), who has not yet met him and therefore does not recognize him. Meanwhile, James "Sawyer" Ford (Josh Holloway), Juliet, and the freighter team head to the Swan Station in order to determine when they are. A second jump brings the group forward in time to after the destruction of the station, while Locke is approached by Richard Alpert (Nestor Carbonell), who recognizes Locke and treats his wound. He informs Locke that they will be strangers at their next meeting, (Note: As depicted in Jughead.) and explains that the only way to stop the erratic movements through time is to bring back everyone who has left the island, and to do that, Locke will have to die.

Another jump brings them to the past, and they find that the Swan station is now intact. Sawyer tries to contact Desmond Hume (Henry Ian Cusick), who is inside, but Daniel asserts that the past can not be changed, and since Desmond did not know Sawyer already when they first met, Sawyer cannot be successful. No one answers, and everyone heads back to the beach. Daniel stays behind and knocks again, and Desmond emerges dressed in a hazmat suit, thus belying Daniel's original assertion. Daniel tells him that if Desmond's future self and the survivors of 815 make it off the island on the helicopter, then he should go to Oxford University and find Daniel's mother, in order to help the survivors. Another jump occurs just before Daniel can give his mother's name.

In 2007, back in Los Angeles, two lawyers deliver a court order to Kate Austen (Evangeline Lilly), demanding a maternity test for her and Aaron, Claire Littleton's (Emilie de Ravin) son, whom Kate is raising as her own, but refuse to reveal their client's identity. In London while en route to Los Angeles, Sun-Hwa Kwon (Yunjin Kim) is confronted by Charles Widmore (Alan Dale) at the airport. She tells him that she wants to kill Benjamin Linus (Michael Emerson), a desire they seem to have in common. Ben and Jack learn from the TV that Hugo "Hurley" Reyes (Jorge Garcia) has broken out, hindering Ben's plan to reunite the Oceanic Six. After his escape, Hurley and Sayid Jarrah (Naveen Andrews) go to a safehouse, which has been infiltrated by two armed men. Sayid kills the men, but not before one of them shoots him with two potent drugged darts, knocking him unconscious. Meanwhile, Ben and Jack Shephard (Matthew Fox) have left the funeral parlor with Locke's body. On a boat in an unknown location, Desmond wakes up, having remembered what Daniel told him, and sets off for Oxford.

== Production ==
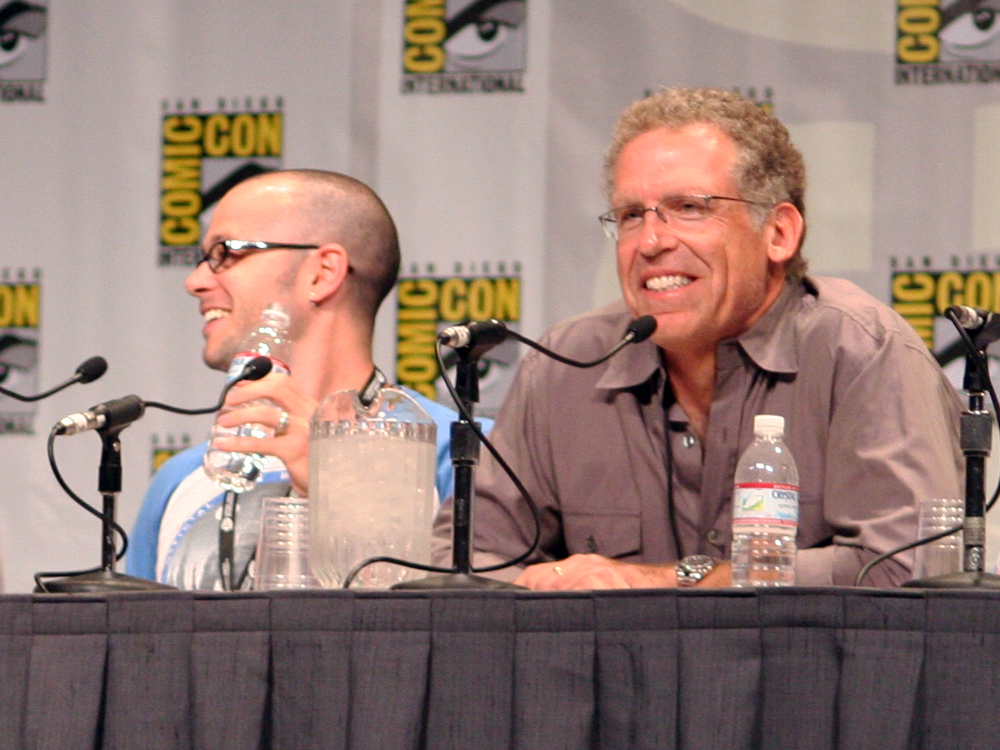
Show runners Damon Lindelof and Carlton Cuse wrote "Because You Left".

Following a writing "mini-camp" to map out the fifth season, the premiere's script was written and filming began on August 19. Show runners Damon Lindelof and Carlton Cuse wrote "Because You Left", and decided to put in the episode a setup for most elements of season 5, especially time travel. In order to avert implementing the time travel in a confusing way, the exposition of Faraday's theories was rewritten to start earlier and be more specific. While previous seasons had been filmed in high definition, this season premiere was the first Lost episode to be edited in it.

Lindelof stated that "When season five starts, you won't know when or where you are. And the way we tell stories will be different too", and confirmed that the "whooshing sound" effect will continue to be used as the transition for the new storytelling device. When asked if episodes continue to focus on specific and different characters, actor Jorge Garcia, who portrays Hurley Reyes, replied that "It's not as clear cut as it's been in the past. We don't have the moments where someone stares off into space and then we cut to something that happened in their previous life. They've gone in a slightly different direction as far as how they're telling the story and they're definitely trying to show what's going on with more people in every given episode." The script included scenes with all the main characters, including Desmond in the ending, because the writers felt that after a long break the audience would like to see every character again. Like the previous three season openers, the opening scene was meant to make viewers "not supposed to have any sense of where and when we are". But while the other premieres had the teaser connecting into the main plot of the episode, the writers decided to put a scene that would only return in the fourteenth episode, "The Variable". The time flashes were designed in a way that demonstrated both the castaways at the beach and John Locke in the jungle were "skipping" to the same time periods, and also to show that time travel was painful for the characters.

In regard to what Lindelof described as "the Zodiac boat with Faraday and the five people that have never spoken a line on show", executive producer/writer/show runner Carlton Cuse said that "I'd be a little bit more worried about the non-line speakers than Faraday", while Lindelof added that "things are looking up for Faraday" and "there is a monsoon coming." Regarding the background survivors in general, Carlton Cuse has responded that there is "a very tragic event that happens this season." According to Lindelof, Neil "Frogurt" (Sean Whalen), a background survivor who has appeared solely in the Lost: Missing Pieces mobisodes, "will rise up this season in the grand tradition of Dr. Leslie Arzt [Daniel Roebuck] to let his feelings be known." Sawyer is shirtless throughout the episode. Cuse jokingly justified as that "for people who really couldn't grasp the time travel aspects of the show, there would be Sawyer without his shirt on for the entire hour." His actor, Josh Holloway, kept fit in the summer break before shooting and noted this as "really disturbing. Coming after a hiatus, that ain't fair!"

== Release and reception ==
The fifth season of Lost was promoted with a music video for the song "You Found Me" by The Fray intercut with new Lost scenes and the tagline, "Destiny Calls". Television critic Maureen Ryan of the Chicago Tribune has deemed the latter an "endlessly mockable slogan"; Don Williams of BuddyTV gave a more positive review, summing it up as "a fitting way to describe the upcoming season." The staff of TV.com ranked the fifth season first on their "Most Anticipated of Early 2009" list. Christopher Rosen of The New York Observer went so far as to deem the return of Lost a "bigge[r] event" than other happenings in that week, specifically the unveiling of the 81st Academy Awards nominations and the United States presidential inauguration of Barack Obama. "Because You Left", as well as the following episode "The Lie" averaged 11.347 million viewers in the US, and 1.195 million in the UK. The episode, aired by itself, brought in 405,000 Australian viewers. "Because You Left" and "The Lie" were uploaded to ABC's media website—ABC Medianet—on December 29, 2008, to be viewed by members of the press for advance reviews attached to limited confidentiality agreements. "Because You Left" was first broadcast on January 21, 2009, on ABC in the United States and was simulcast on A in Canada, back-to-back with the next episode, "The Lie". Before the broadcast was aired "Lost: Destiny Calls", a clip-show recapping the first four seasons. It marked Lost's return to its original timeslot on Wednesdays.

Reviews were positive. James Poniewozik of Time thought that "Because You Left" provided a good balance of characterization and mythology and commended the character of Faraday, partially "because a perfectly-cast Jeremy Davies has turned him into a likeable, flawed, brusque, slightly-in-over-his-head nebbish-god." Matt Mitovich of TV Guide stated that the premiere "offer[s] compelling twists … the foundation is laid for a pivotal penultimate season … it sends the mind reeling and uncorks infinite possibilities." Robert Bianco of USA Today wrote that "it's hard to name a series that is as engaging, surprising and flat-out gorgeous as Lost, or one in which every effort and penny expended seems to be put to shimmering good use. This is an epic big-screen adventure done for the small screen—and done in a way that makes most big-screen versions pale in comparison." Bianco also commended the characterizations, noting them as realistic and compelling. Maureen Ryan of the Chicago Tribune praised the opening sequence, calling it "really, really great … nerd-tastic for [the] hardcore Lost fan; it's full of shout-outs and callbacks to classic Lost moments and trivia." She concluded that the premiere is "quite good" (three and a half out of four stars) with "a lot to like", specifically the expanded screen time for Faraday; however, Ryan expressed difficulty in understanding the use of time (travel) in the show and felt that one to two more viewings were warranted for her to give a better review of that aspect. Verne Gay of Newsday summed up that "The season's premiere represents pig-in-the-python storytelling—there's so much to work through, so many details, stories, characters and time dimensions to attend to, that after a while this all starts to feel like a very full meal. A bloated feeling may result." Among other pieces of praise, Tim Goodman of the San Francisco Chronicle was impressed by the "parallel plotting" of the characters on and off the island in different times. Despite deeming the premiere "riveting" and the script "tantalizing as ever", Matthew Gilbert of The Boston Globe had a mixed response, for he worried that he would not be able to handle a season's worth of time travel, stating that "I may be alone in this, and I hope I will be proven wrong, but I expected the solution to "Lost" to be more metaphysical, and more original, than simply people being unstuck in time." Alan Sepinwall of The Star-Ledger deemed it "really good, in terms of keeping the momentum from last season going, servicing the characters and their emotions, and providing an appropriate number of 'Whoa's per hour." In a three out of four stars review, Thomas Connor of the Chicago Sun-Times stated that "the time-travel training wheels are coming off—and the path thus far seems blissfully free of the usual stumbling blocks", due to the previous four seasons of "baby steps" that set up the science fiction driven fifth season. Caryn Kunz of the Honolulu Advertiser said that "This was a great episode to get back into every aspect of our favorite show: relationships, mythology, reunions/cameos, and enough whoa moments to keep me on the edge of my seat throughout."

Jeff Jensen of Entertainment Weekly summed up the entirety of the premiere as "pretty cool" and "worth the wait". He wrote that "Lost's tradition of opening the year with a killer, capture-the-imagination sequence is honored and upheld, though the thing I loved most was how it was brazenly frank (and engagingly funny) about the heady high-concept conceit that will define the season." Brian Lowry of Variety concluded that "Lost … approaches its twists with what appears to be a greater degree of intellectual rigor than almost anything else on primetime. Even when it's difficult to keep track of the myriad connections, a sense lingers that somebody knows—which is strangely reassuring." Despite being more interested in the romantic aspirations of the show's characters, Jennifer Godwin of E! remarked that "the Lost mythology is a miracle to behold. It's grandiose, compelling, gaspworthy and, despite what the haters would have you believe, altogether satisfying". Katherine Nichols of the Honolulu Star-Bulletin enjoyed the opening scene, "but the rest of it didn't capture [her] as [she] hoped it would", citing high expectations due to the eight-month hiatus after the fourth-season finale and a possible "yearning for more character-driven stories over machinations revolving around time travel, however clever they might be." John Kubicek of BuddyTV said that "the opening scene itself will leave your mouth wide open and you'll probably forget to close it for a few minutes." He also wrote the premiere episodes "are vintage Lost, full of some unbelievable twists and a whole lot of groundwork". H.T. Strong of Ain't It Cool News said that "Because You Left" "is a corker, aggressively advancing the story in all kinds of directions."
