= Castle Yankee =

1954 test of thermonuclear bomb

Information
- Country: United States
- Test series: Operation Castle
- Test site: Bikini Atoll
- Date: 5 May 1954; 72 years ago
- Test type: Atmospheric
- Yield: 13.5 Mt

Test chronology

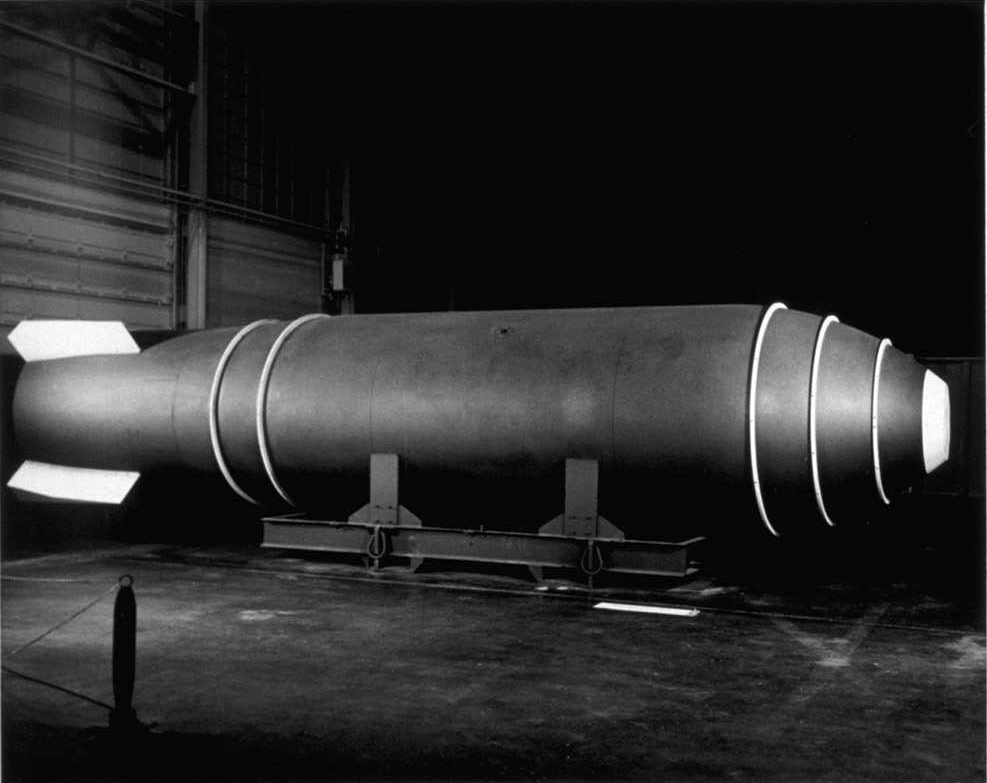
Mark 17 nuclear bomb

Castle Yankee was the code name given to one of the tests in the Operation Castle series of American tests of thermonuclear bombs. It was originally intended as a test of a TX-16/EC-16 Jughead bomb, but the design became obsolete after the Castle Bravo test was successful. The test device was replaced with a TX-24/EC-24 Runt II bomb which was detonated on May 5, 1954, at Bikini Atoll. It released energy equivalent to 13.5 megatons of TNT, the second-largest yield ever in a U.S. fusion weapon test.

== Jughead ==
Yankee was originally intended to be a test of a TX-16/EC-16, a weaponized version of the large and complex Ivy Mike device. A small number of emergency capability EC-16s were produced, without being tested, to provide a stop-gap thermonuclear weapon capability in response to the Soviet nuclear weapons program.

The test device, code-named Jughead, had been prepared as a backup in case the non-cryogenic Castle Bravo Shrimp device failed to work.

After the Bravo test, which had an unexpectedly high yield, the question of whether to proceed with Jughead was raised, despite the device being "here, set up and ready[,] and valuable information relative to [Ivy] Mike would result [from the test]", as scientist Alvin C. Graves communicated to Los Alamos director Norris Bradbury. But, Graves continued, because high-yield shots were "dangerous" (as evidenced by the fallout contamination created by Bravo), and "the number of good shooting days were limited", "implies that the justification for them must be strong". As the success of Bravo meant that the cryogenic approach would not be necessary, and because of the aforementioned safety concerns, the Jughead shot was cancelled, and the existing EC-16s were subsequently withdrawn and dismantled.

== Runt II ==
Jughead was replaced by the Runt II device (a TX-24/EC-24), developed from the Castle Romeo Runt device (a TX-17/EC-17). Externally identical, the principal difference between them was in the fuel for the fusion stage. While Runt used natural lithium (with 7.5% of the Lithium-6 isotope), Runt II used the same partially enriched lithium (approximately 40% Lithium-6) as the Shrimp device of Castle Bravo.

It was detonated on 5 May 1954, at Bikini Atoll of the Marshall Islands, on a barge moored in the middle of the crater from the Castle Union test.

Although it had been predicted to produce a yield of 6 to 10 megatons, it actually produced a yield of 13.5 megatons, the second-largest ever yield in a U.S. fusion weapon test. Like the Mike, Bravo and Romeo tests, a large percentage of the yield was produced by fast fission of the natural uranium tamper. Of the total yield, 7 megatons were from fission; the other 6.5 megatons were from fusion reactions. The high fusion yield was due to the enriched fuel and set a U.S. record that stood until Hardtack Poplar in 1958.
