= Mark 24 nuclear bomb =

American thermonuclear bomb design

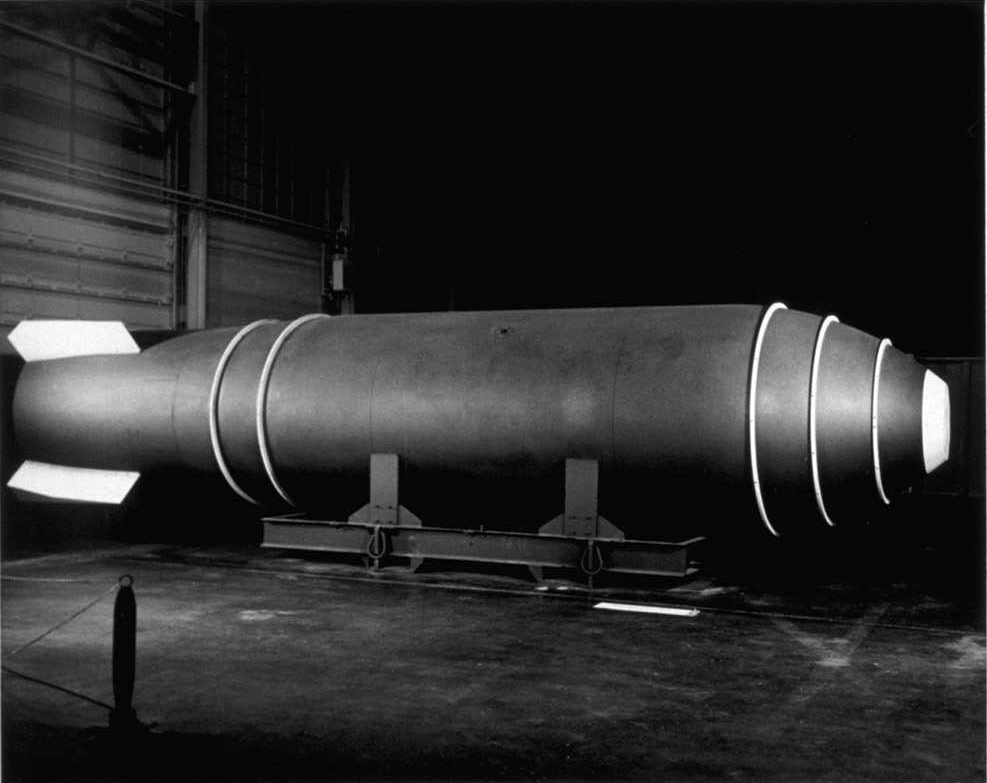
- A Mk-17 or Mk-24 bomb (casings are identical)
- Type: Thermonuclear gravity bomb
- Place of origin: United States

Service history
- In service: 1954-1956
- Wars: Cold War

Production history
- Designer: Los Alamos National Laboratory
- Designed: 1954
- Produced: EC-24: Mar-Oct 1954; Mk-24: Jul 1954-Nov 1955
- No. built: EC-24: 10; Mk-24: 105

Specifications
- Mass: EC-24: 39,600 lb (18,000 kg); Mk-24: 41,400–42,000 lb (18,800–19,100 kg)
- Length: 24 feet 8 inches (7.52 m)
- Diameter: 61.4 inches (1.56 m)
- Detonation mechanism: Air burst
- Blast yield: EC-24: 13.5 megatonnes of TNT (56 PJ), Castle Yankee test Mk-24: 15 megatonnes of TNT (63 PJ)

The Mark 24 nuclear bomb was an American thermonuclear bomb design, based on the third American thermonuclear bomb test, Castle Yankee. The Mark 24 bomb was tied as the largest weight and size nuclear bomb ever deployed by the United States, with the same size and weight as the Mark 17 nuclear bomb which used a very similar design concept but unenriched lithium.

The Castle Yankee thermonuclear test was the first bomb to use lithium enriched with the lithium-6 isotope, up to perhaps 40% enrichment (the earlier Castle Bravo test had used the same enriched lithium combination but was not weaponised i.e. was not built as a deployable bomb). The device tested was called the Runt II design; other than the enrichment level, it was reportedly very similar to the Runt design tested in Castle Romeo.

Castle Yankee had a demonstrated yield of 13.5 megatons. The yield for the weaponized Mark 24 was predicted to be 10–15 megatons.

The EC24 bomb was a limited production run of the Castle Yankee test device, with 10 produced and stockpiled through 1954. The EC24 was 61 by 255 inches (1.55 by 6.48 m) and weighed 39,600 pounds (18,000 kg). The EC24 was a purely free-fall bomb design.

== Design ==
The production model Mark 24 nuclear bomb was 61.4 by 296 inches (1.56 by 7.52 m) long, with a weight between 41,000 and 42,000 pounds (18,600 and 19,100 kg). It was in service between 1954 and 1956, with a total of 105 units produced. The Mark 24 included a 64-foot-diameter (20 m) parachute to slow its descent.

The bomb used manual in-flight insertion (IFI) that required a crewmember to crank a handle that was inserted into a hole in the nose of the bomb. This process inserted the weapon's pit into the implosion assembly.

== Survivors ==
A Mark 24 casing is on display in the Castle Air Museum in Atwater, California.

== See also ==
- List of nuclear weapons
- Nuclear weapon design
- Teller-Ulam design
- Mark 17 nuclear bomb
