= Mark 17 nuclear bomb =

American hydrogen bomb

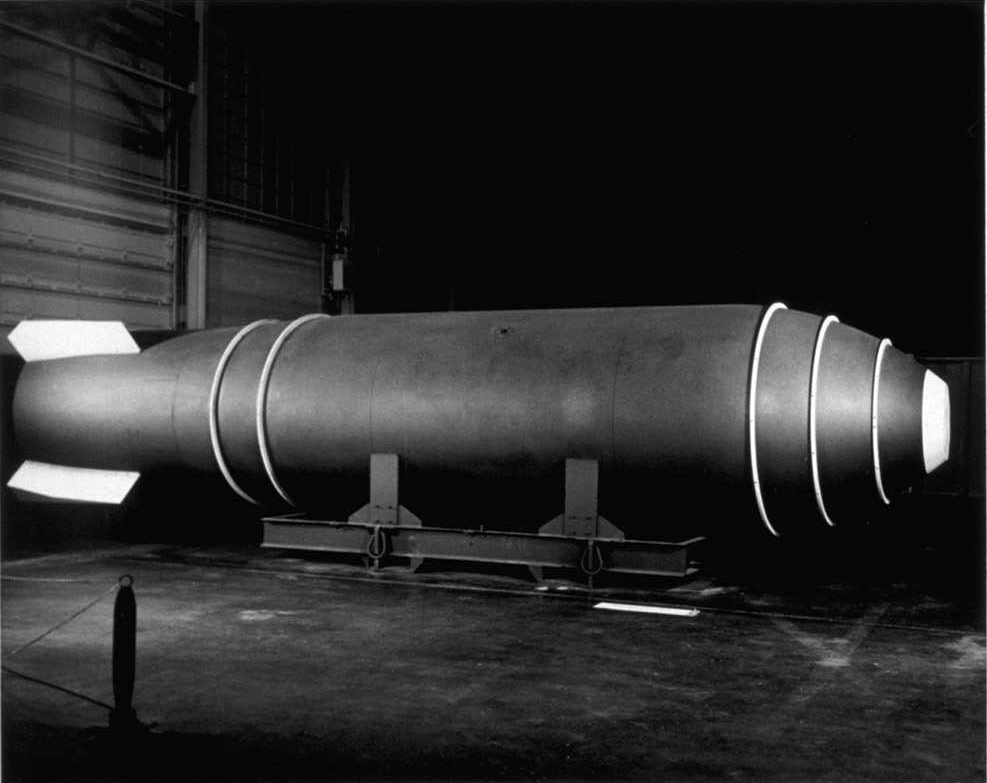
- Type: Thermonuclear gravity bomb
- Place of origin: United States

Service history
- In service: 1954-1957
- Wars: Cold War

Production history
- Designer: Los Alamos National Laboratory
- Designed: 1954
- Produced: EC-17: Mar-Oct 1954; Mk-17: Jul 1954-Nov 1955
- No. built: EC-17: 5 Mk-17: 200

Specifications
- Mass: EC-17: 39,600 lb (18,000 kg); Mk-17: 41,400–42,000 lb (18,800–19,100 kg)
- Length: 24 feet 8 inches (7.52 m)
- Diameter: 61.4 inches (1.56 m)
- Detonation mechanism: Air burst
- Blast yield: EC-17: 11 megatonnes of TNT (46 PJ), Castle Romeo test Mk-17: 15 megatonnes of TNT (63 PJ)

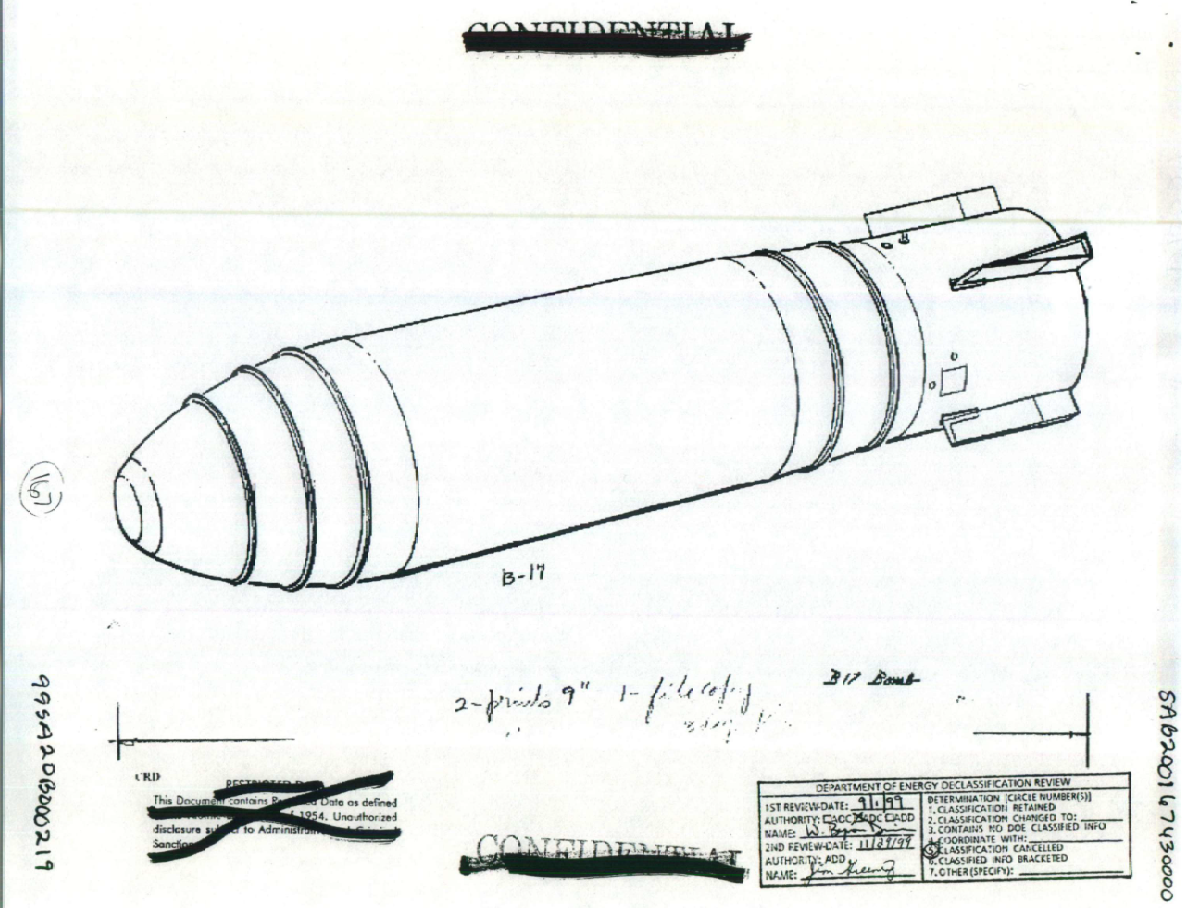
Drawing of a Mark 17 bomb

The Mark 17 and Mark 24 were the first mass-produced hydrogen bombs deployed by the United States. The two differed in the lithium enrichment of their secondary stages. They entered service in 1954, and were phased out by 1957.

== Design and development ==
Design and development originated when Los Alamos National Laboratory proposed that a bomb design using lithium deuteride with non-enriched lithium was possible. The new design was designated TX-17 on February 24, 1953. The TX-17 and 24 were tested as the "Runt" (Castle Romeo shot) device during Operation Castle in 1954. After the successful tests, basic versions of the Mk 17 and 24 were deployed as part of the "Emergency Capability" program.

The MK 17/24 bombs were 24 feet 8 inches (7.52 m) long, and 61.4 inches (1.56 m) diameter. They weighed 42,000 lb (19,000 kg). The Mark 17 had a yield of 15 megatonnes of TNT (63 PJ). 200 Mk 17s and 105 Mk 24s were produced, all between October 1954 and November 1955. The Mark 17 and Mark 24 were identical in all respects save for the design of their primary section. They were the largest nuclear weapons ever put into service by the United States; only the Convair B-36 Peacemaker was capable of carrying them.

The bomb used manual in-flight insertion (IFI) that required a crewmember to crank a handle that was inserted into a hole in the nose of the bomb. This process inserted the weapon's pit into the implosion assembly.

== Operational history ==
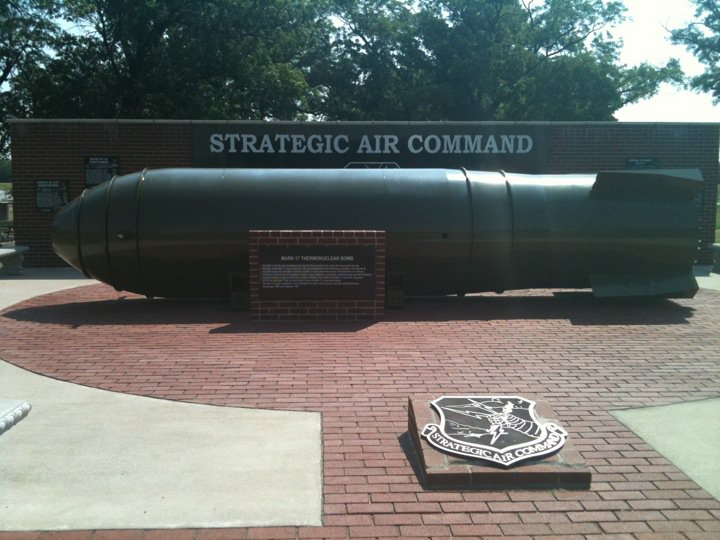
A Mark 17 on display at the Strategic Air Command Memorial in Naval Air Station Fort Worth Joint Reserve Base at Carswell Field in Fort Worth, Texas

A total of five EC 17 and ten EC 24 bombs subsequently entered stockpile and were added between April and October 1954. The EC weapons were quickly replaced with Mk 17 Mod 0 and Mk 24 Mod 0 bombs in October and November 1954. Those weapons included a 64-foot-diameter (20 m) parachute to allow the delivery aircraft to escape. With the addition of in-flight insertion of the primary capsule to prevent a nuclear explosion in case of an accident, the weapons were upgraded to the Mod 1 standard. The inclusion of a contact fuze upgraded some bombs to the Mod 2 version, allowing the bombs to be used against "soft" targets (air burst), or buried targets such as command bunkers (contact burst).

Due to the introduction of smaller and lighter weapons such as the Mk 15, as well as the pending retirement of the only aircraft capable of carrying them, the B-36, the Mk 24s were withdrawn by October 1956, with the Mk 17s withdrawn by August 1957.

== 1957 incident ==
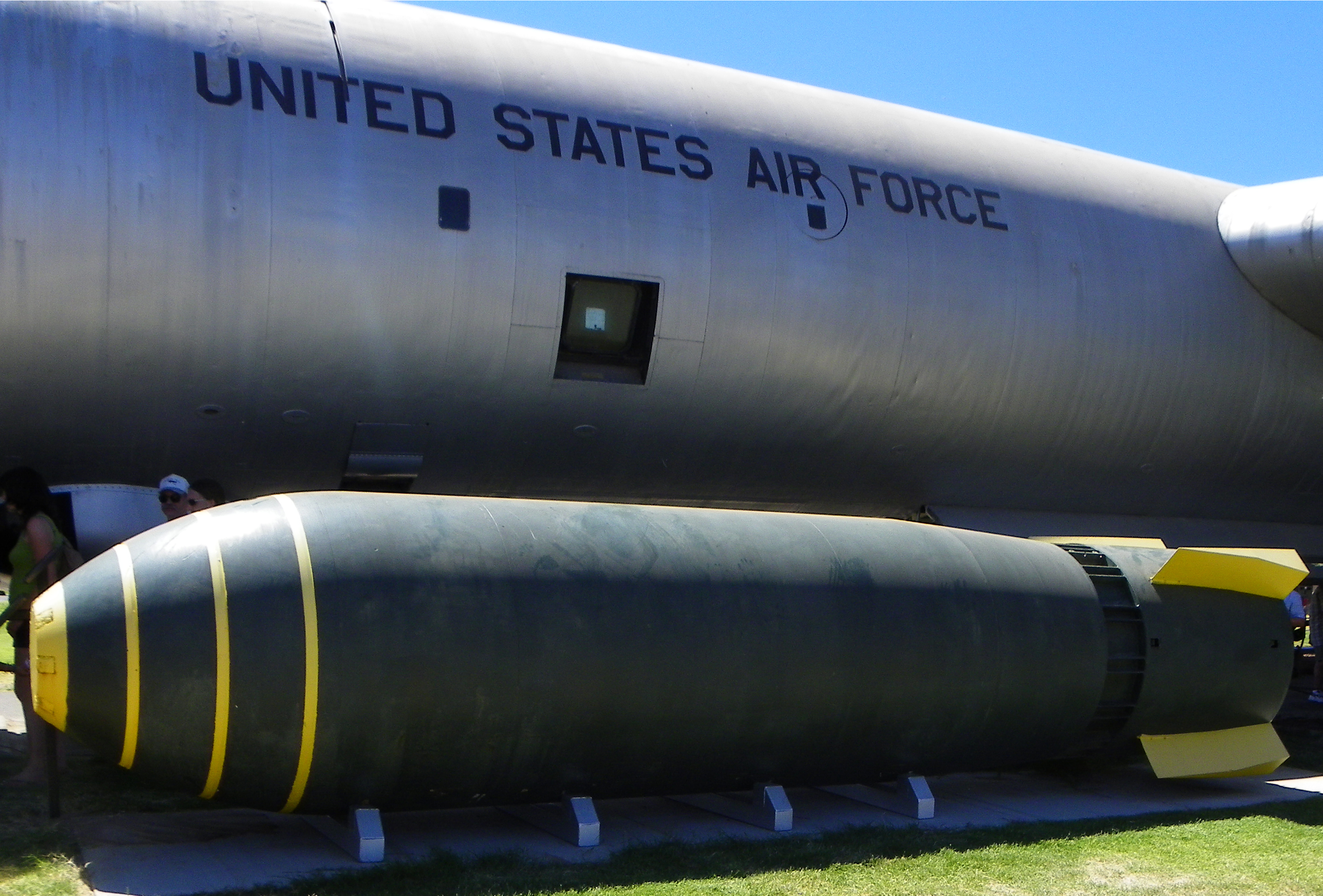
A Mark 17 on display at the Castle Air Museum

On May 27, 1957 a Mark 17 was unintentionally jettisoned from a Convair B-36 Peacemaker just south of Albuquerque, New Mexico's Kirtland AFB. The device fell through the closed bomb bay doors of the bomber, which was approaching Kirtland at an altitude of 520 metres (1,700 ft). The device's conventional explosives destroyed it on impact, leaving a crater 7.6 metres (25 ft) in diameter and 3.7 metres (12 ft) deep. Though a chain reaction was impossible because the plutonium pits were stored separately on the plane as a safety measure, the incident spread radioactive contamination and debris over a 1-mile-wide (1.6 km) area. The military decontaminated the site although a few fragments of the bomb – some still radioactive – are occasionally found in the area. A marker was placed on the site in 1996 by the Center for Land Use Interpretation, but it was later removed.

== Survivors ==
Five MK 17/24 casings are on display to the public:

- National Museum of Nuclear Science & History in Albuquerque, New Mexico
- The Strategic Air Command Memorial at Naval Air Station Fort Worth Joint Reserve Base at Carswell Field in Fort Worth, Texas
- The National Museum of the United States Air Force in Dayton, Ohio has a Mk 17/24 casing on display in its Cold War Hangar.
- The Strategic Air and Space Museum in Ashland, Nebraska
- Castle Air Museum in Atwater, California

== See also ==
- List of nuclear weapons
- List of military nuclear accidents
- Castle Bravo
- Teller-Ulam design
