= Aomen =

Aomen may refer to:

- Aomen (Bikini Atoll), an island in the Pacific Ocean
- Àomén, or Macau, a special administrative region of China
