= Aomen (Bikini Atoll) =

Island in the Pacific Ocean

Coordinates: 11.69118°N 165.42825°E

Aomen, also known as Aomoen, is an island twelve kilometers northwest of Bikini Island, Bikini Atoll, Marshall Islands. The portion of the island covered by vegetation is approximately 93,078 m^{2} in area. The ruins of a concrete bunker constructed during the nuclear tests at the atoll is located on the southern tip of the island.

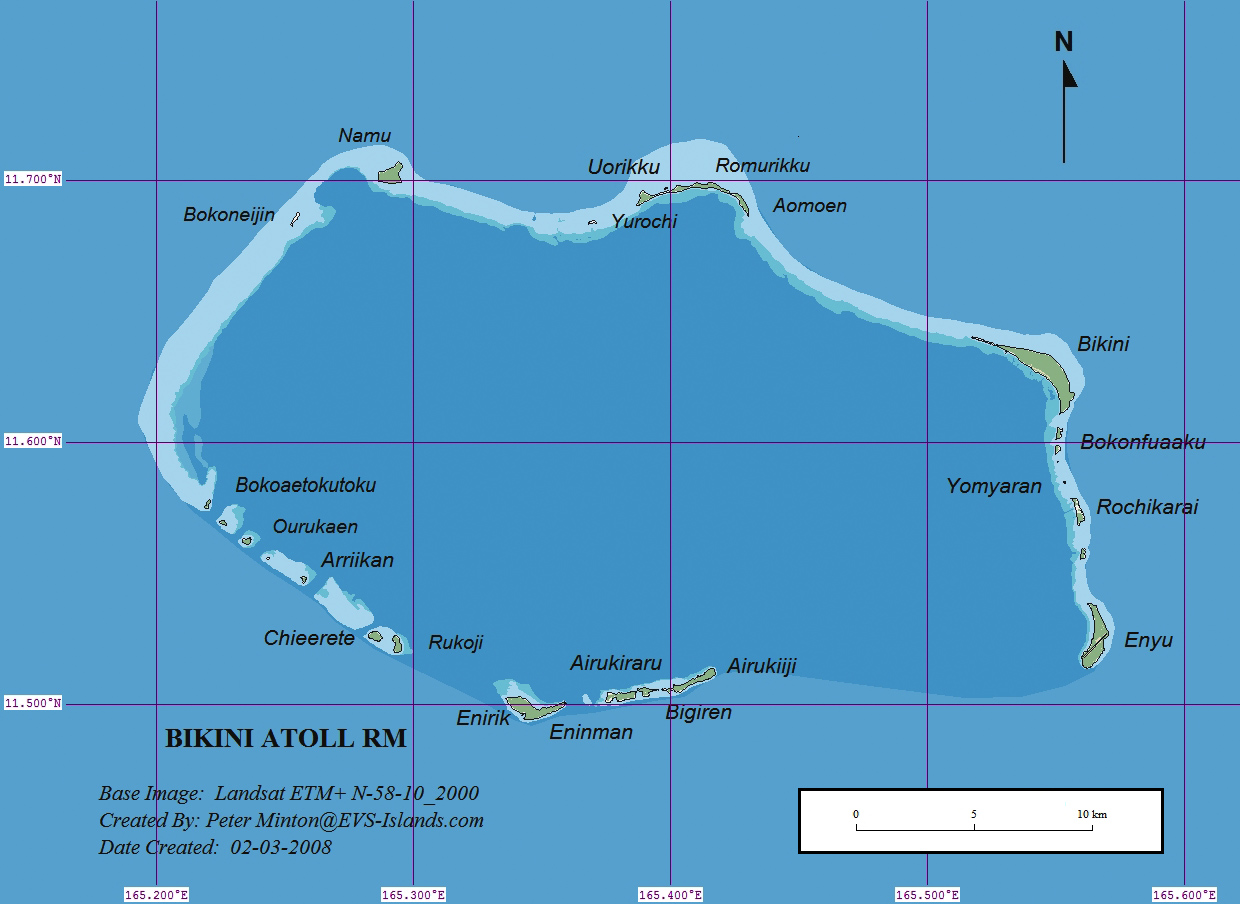
Map of the Bikini Atoll. Aomoen is found in the north of the Atoll, northwest of Bikini Island.
