= List of books with anti-war themes =

Books with anti-war themes have explicit anti-war messages or have been described as having significant anti-war themes or sentiments. Not all of these books have a direct connection to any particular anti-war movement. The list includes fiction and non-fiction, and books for children and younger readers.

== Fiction ==
- All Men Are Enemies – Richard Aldington
- Beelzebub’s Tales to His Grandson – George I. Gurdjieff, 1949
- All Quiet on the Western Front – Erich Maria Remarque, 1928
- The Americanization of Emily – William Bradford Huie, 1964
- Ashe of Rings – Mary Butts novel, 1926
- Bid Me To Live – H.D. novel, 1960
- Captain Jinks, Hero – Ernest Crosby, 1902
- Catch-22 – Joseph Heller, 1961
- A Doctor's Journal Entry For 6 August,1945 - Vikram Seth
- Cat's Cradle – Kurt Vonnegut science fiction novel
- Celestial Matters – Richard Garfinkle science fiction novel
- Company K – William March novel
- Dead Yesterday – Mary Agnes Hamilton novel, 1916
- Death Of A Hero – Richard Aldington
- Despised and Rejected – Rose Allatini novel (published under the name A. T. Fitzroy) 1918
- A Fable – William Faulkner, 1954, World War I
- The Empty Drum - Leo Tolstoy, 1887
- A Farewell to Arms – Ernest Hemingway, 1929
- For Whom the Bell Tolls – Ernest Hemingway, 1940
- The Forever War – Joe Haldeman science fiction novel
- From Here to Eternity – James Jones novel
- Generals Die in Bed – Charles Yale Harrison novel
- The Good Soldier Svejk – Jaroslav Hašek novel
- Involution & Evolution – Joss Sheldon novel
- Johnny Got His Gun – Dalton Trumbo novel, 1938
- Journey to the End of the Night – Louis-Ferdinand Céline novel
- Lay Down Your Arms! – Bertha von Suttner novel
- Looking Good – Keith Maillard novel
- Legend of the Galactic Heroes – Yoshiki Tanaka
- Lyndon Johnson and the Majorettes – Keith Maillard novel
- Lysistrata – Aristophanes play, 411 BCE
- The Naked and the Dead – Norman Mailer novel
- Non-Combatants and Others – Rose Macaulay novel, 1916
- Not So Quiet: Stepdaughters of War – Evadne Price (as Helen Zenna Smith) novel, 1930
- On the Beach – Nevil Shute novel
- The Once and Future King – T. H. White, 1958
- Paths of Glory – Humphrey Cobb, 1935
- Quiet Ways – Katharine Burdekin novel, 1930
- The Red Badge of Courage – Stephen Crane novel, 1895
- Regeneration – Pat Barker
- Shabdangal – Malayalam novel, 1947
- The Short-Timers – Gustav Hasford novel
- Slaughterhouse Five – Kurt Vonnegut science fiction novel
- The Sorrow of War – Bảo Ninh novel, 1990
- The Thin Red Line – James Jones novel, 1962
- The Things They Carried – Tim O'Brien, 1990
- Three Soldiers – John Dos Passos novel, 1921, World War I
- The Tin Drum – Günter Grass novel
- The Train Was on Time (Der Zug war pünktlich) – Heinrich Böll novel, 1949
- Two Women – Alberto Moravia novel, 1958
- Under Fire – Henri Barbusse novel, 1916
- The Unknown Soldier – Väinö Linna novel, 1954
- Voyage to Faremido – Frigyes Karinthy novel, 1916
- "War" - Ludwig Renn novel, 1928.
- War Porn - Roy Scranton novel, 2016.
- "The War Prayer" – Mark Twain short story, c.1910
- War with the Newts – Karel Čapek, novel 1936
- The Wars – Timothy Findley novel, 1977
- Why Are We in Vietnam? – Norman Mailer novel, 1967
- Why Was I Killed? (retitled Return of the Traveller in the US) – Rex Warner novel, 1943

== Non-fiction ==
- Addicted to War – Joel Andreas, 1991, 2002
- Old Man at the Bridge - Ernest Hemingway May 1938
- The Armies of the Night – Norman Mailer non-fiction novel, 1968
- Autobiography:The Story of my Experiments with Truth – Mohandas K. Gandhi, 1927
- The Bloody Traffic – Fenner Brockway, 1934
- Born on the Fourth of July – Ron Kovic autobiography, 1976
- The Causes of World War Three – C. Wright Mills, 1958
- The Cold and the Dark: The World after Nuclear War – Paul R. Ehrlich, Carl Sagan and Donald Kennedy, 1984
- Collateral Damage: America's War Against Iraqi Civilians – Chris Hedges, 2008
- The Complaint of Peace – Desiderius Erasmus, 1517
- The Conduct of the Allies – Jonathan Swift, 1711
- The Conquest of Violence – Bart de Ligt, 1937
- Cry Havoc! – Beverley Nichols, 1933
- Disenchantment – C. E. Montague, 1922
- The Education of a Christian Prince – Desiderius Erasmus, 1516
- Einstein on Peace – edited by Otto Nathan and Heinz Norden; preface by Bertrand Russell, 1960
- Ends and Means – Aldous Huxley essays, 1937
- Fate of the Earth – Jonathan Schell, 1982
- The Gift of Time: The Case for Abolishing Nuclear Weapons Now – Jonathan Schell, 1998
- Good-Bye to All That - Robert Graves, 1929
- Hiroshima – John Hersey account of the bombings, 1946
- Human Smoke – Nicholson Baker
- If the War Goes On … – Hermann Hesse, 1971
- In Solitary Witness: The Life and Death of Franz Jägerstätter – Gordon C. Zahn, 1981
- The Killing Zone: My Life in the Vietnam War – Frederick Downs, 1978
- The Kingdom of God is Within You – Leo Tolstoy, 1894
- The Inevitable Revolution – Leo Tolstoy, 1909
- Krieg dem Kriege aka War Against War – Ernst Friedrich, 1924
- The Last Weapon and its sequel The Weapon Unsheathed – Theodora Wilson Wilson, 1916
- The Long Road to Greenham: Feminism and Anti-Militarism in Britain since 1820 – Jill Liddington, 1989
- Miami and the Siege of Chicago – Norman Mailer non-fiction novel, 1968
- New Cyneas – Émeric Crucé, 1623
- Newer Ideals of Peace – Jane Addams, 1907
- No Victory Parades: The Return of the Vietnam Veteran – Murray Polner, 1971
- Nonviolence: The history of a dangerous idea – Mark Kurlansky, 2006
- Nuclear Terrorism: The Ultimate Preventable Catastrophe – Graham Allison, 2004
- Nuclear Weapons: The Road to Zero – edited by Joseph Rotblat, 1998
- Pacifism in Europe to 1914, Peter Brock, 1972
- Pacifism in the Twentieth Century – Peter Brock and Nigel Young, 1999
- Pacifism in the United States – Peter Brock, 1968
- Peace Is Possible: Conversations with Arab and Israeli Leaders from 1988 to the Present – S. Daniel Abraham, Bill Clinton, 2006
- Peace Signs: The Anti-War Movement Illustrated – James Mann, editor, 2004
- Peace with Honour – A. A. Milne, 1934
- A People's History of the United States – Howard Zinn, 1980
- Perpetual Peace: A Philosophical Sketch – Immanuel Kant essay, 1795
- The Politics of Jesus – John Howard Yoder, 1972
- The Power of Non-Violence – Richard B. Gregg, 1934
- The Root Is Man: Two Essays in Politics – Dwight Macdonald, 1953
- Scapegoats of the Empire – Lt. George Witton memoir, 1907
- Science, Liberty and Peace – Aldous Huxley, 1946
- The Seventh Decade: The New Shape of Nuclear Danger – Jonathan Schell, 2007
- The Struggle Against the Bomb 1 - One World or None: a history of the world nuclear disarmament movement through 1953 – Lawrence S. Wittner, 1993
- The Struggle Against the Bomb 2 - Resisting the Bomb: a history of the world nuclear disarmament movement, 1954-1970 – Lawrence S. Wittner, 1997
- The Struggle Against the Bomb 3 - Toward Nuclear Abolition: a history of the world nuclear disarmament movement, 1971 to the present – Lawrence S. Wittner, 2003
- Testament of Youth – Vera Brittain, 1933
- The Third Morality – Gerald Heard, 1937
- Three Guineas – Virginia Woolf, 1938
- Conscience for Change, reprinted as The Trumpet of Conscience – (five transcribed lectures given by) Martin Luther King Jr., 1968
- Voices Against War: A Century of Protest – Lyn Smith, 2009
- War and Democracy – Paul Gottfried, 2012
- War Is a Force That Gives Us Meaning – Chris Hedges, 2003
- War Is a Lie – David Swanson, 2010
- War Is a Racket – former U.S. Marine Major General Smedley Butler speech, 1933 and pamphlet, 1935
- Warheads to Windmills: Preventing Climate Catastrophe and Nuclear War – Timmon Wallis, 2024
- We Will Not Cease – Archibald Baxter memoir, 1939
- Which Way to Peace? – Bertrand Russell, 1936
- Why Men Fight – Bertrand Russell, 1916
- Women, Power, and the Biology of Peace – Judith Hand, 2003
- Worthy of Gratitude? Why Veterans May Not Want to be Thanked for Their Service in War – Camillo Mac Bica, Gnosis Press, 2015
- Writings Against Power and Death – Alex Comfort, 1994

== Anthologies of anti-war writing ==
- Peace is the Way: writings on nonviolence from the Fellowship of Reconciliation – edited by Walter Wink
- We Who Dared to Say No to War: American Antiwar Writing from 1812 to Now – Murray Polner, Thomas Woods, 2008

== Juvenile fiction ==
- The Butter Battle Book – Dr. Seuss, 1984
- Children of the Book – Peter Carter, 1982
- The Clay Marble – Minfong Ho novel, 1991
- Fallen Angels – Walter Dean Myers novel, 1988
- Habibi – Naomi Shihab Nye novel, 1997
- I Had Seen Castles – Cynthia Rylant, 1993
- Soldier's Heart: A Novel of the Civil War – Gary Paulsen novel, 1998
- Sunrise over Fallujah – Walter Dean Myers, 2008
- War Horse – Michael Morpurgo, 1982
- Glinda of Oz by L. Frank Baum (published posthumously), Reilly & Lee, 1920.

== See also ==
- List of peace activists
- List of anti-war songs
- List of anti-war plays
- List of anti-war films
