= Brotherman (disambiguation) =

Brotherman is a soundtrack album by The Final Solution.

Brotherman may also refer to:

- Brother Man, a 1954 novel by Roger Mais
- Brotherman: The Odyssey of Black Men in America, a 1995 book edited by Herb Boyd and Robert L. Allen
- Brotherman: Dictator of Discipline, a comic by Dawud Anyabwile and Guy A. Sims
- "Brotherman", a song by John Cale from blackAcetate
