= Monster (2018 film) =

2018 film by Anthony Mandler

- Release poster
- Directed by: Anthony Mandler
- Screenplay by: Radha Blank; Cole Wiley; Janece Shaffer
- Based on: Monster by Walter Dean Myers
- Produced by: Tonya Lewis Lee; Nikki Silver; Aaron L. Gilbert; Mike Jackson; Edward Tyler Nahem
- Starring: Kelvin Harrison Jr.; Jennifer Ehle; Tim Blake Nelson; ASAP Rocky; John David Washington; Jennifer Hudson; Jeffrey Wright
- Cinematography: David Devlin
- Edited by: Joe Klotz
- Music by: Harvey Mason Jr.
- Production companies: Bron Studios; Charlevoix Entertainment; Get Lifted Film Company; Tonik Productions; Red Crown Productions; Creative Wealth Media
- Distributed by: Netflix
- Release dates: January 22, 2018 (Sundance); May 7, 2021 (United States)
- Running time: 98 minutes
- Country: United States
- Language: English

Monster is a 2018 American legal drama film directed by Anthony Mandler, from a screenplay by Radha Blank, Cole Wiley, and Janece Shaffer, based on the novel of the same name by Walter Dean Myers. It stars Kelvin Harrison Jr., Jennifer Ehle, Tim Blake Nelson, Nas, ASAP Rocky, Paul Ben-Victor, John David Washington, Jennifer Hudson, and Jeffrey Wright. Wright, Nas, and John Legend also serve as executive producers on the film.

Three years after its world premiere at the Sundance Film Festival on January 22, 2018, the film was acquired by Netflix and released on May 7, 2021. It received generally positive reviews from critics.

== Premise ==
Monster tells the story of a young Steve Harmon (Kelvin Harrison Jr.) a seventeen-year-old honor student whose world comes crashing down around him when he is charged with felony murder. The film follows his dramatic journey from a smart, likeable film student from Harlem attending an elite high school through a complex legal battle that could leave him spending the rest of his life in prison.

— Netflix

== Cast ==
- Kelvin Harrison Jr. as Steve Harmon
- Jennifer Hudson as Ranetta Harmon
- Jeffrey Wright as Percy Harmon
- Jennifer Ehle as Maureen O'Brien
- Tim Blake Nelson as Leroy Sawicki
- ASAP Rocky as James King
- Paul Ben-Victor as Anthony Petrocelli
- John David Washington as Richard "Bobo" Evans
- Nas as Raymond "Sunset" Green
- Jharrel Jerome as Osvaldo Cruz
- Dorian Missick as Asa Briggs
- Willie C. Carpenter as Judge
- Rege Lewis as Ernie Ryans
- Jonny Coyne as Detective Karyl
- Lovie Simone as Renee Pickford
- Liam Obergfoll as Casper Juenemann
- Mikey Madison as Alexandra Floyd
- Nyleek Moore as Jerry Harmon
- Roberto Lopez as Mr. Nesbitt

== Release ==
The film premiered in the U.S. Dramatic Competition section at the 2018 Sundance Film Festival. In April 2019, it was announced that Entertainment Studios had acquired distribution rights to the film, retitled All Rise. In November 2020, Netflix acquired distribution rights to the film, with the title switching back to Monster. It was released on their service on May 7, 2021.

== Reception ==
On the review aggregator website Rotten Tomatoes, 68% of 62 critics' reviews are positive, with an average rating of 6.1/10. The website's critical consensus reads, "Monster would have benefited from a less heavy-handed approach, but Kelvin Harrison Jr.'s performance gives this timely drama emotional heft." According to Metacritic, which assigned a weighted average score of 56 out of 100 based on 18 critics, the film received "mixed or average reviews".

== See also ==
- List of black films of the 2010s
- List of hood films
