= NYU Veterans Writing Workshop =

The NYU Veterans Writing Workshop at New York University in Manhattan, New York is a free, non-partisan outreach program offered to the veteran community in and around New York City and is considered by some as the pre-eminent writing workshop for veterans.

== History ==
The workshop began in 2008, founded by former United States Ambassador to Ireland Jean Kennedy Smith.

== Alumni ==
Notable alumni of the workshop include:

- Jason Everman
- Phil Klay
- Matt Gallagher
- Roy Scranton

== Prizes won by alumni ==
NYU Veterans Writing Workshop alumni have thus far won 1 National Book Award and other literary honors.
