= Frederick Douglass (disambiguation) =

Frederick Douglass (c. 1818 – 1895) was an African-American social reformer, abolitionist, orator, writer, and statesman.

Frederick Douglass may also refer to:

- Frederick Douglass Jr. (1842–1892), son of Frederick Douglass, abolitionist, essayist and newspaper editor
- Frederick Douglass (Moore opera), a 1985 opera by Dorothy Rudd Moore
- Frederick Douglass (Ulysses Kay opera) (1991)
- Frederick Douglass (Weitzman), a 2013 bronze sculpture by Steven Weitzman in Washington, D.C.
- Frederick Douglass (Edwards), a 2015 bronze sculpture by Andrew Edwards in College Park, Maryland
- Frederick Douglass: The Lion Who Wrote History, a 2017 picture book biography by Walter Dean Myers
- Frederick Douglass: Prophet of Freedom, a 2018 biography by David W. Blight

== Other people with similar names ==
- Frederick Douglass Moon (1896–1975), American educator, community leader, and writer
- Frederick D. Patterson (1901–1988), born Frederick Douglass Patterson, American academic administrator
- Frederick Patterson (1871–1932), born Frederick Douglass Patterson, American businessman and car manufacturer
- Frederic Huntington Douglas (1897–1956), curator at the Denver Art Museum in Denver, Colorado
- Fred J. Douglas (1869–1949), US Representative
- Frederick Sylvester North Douglas (1791–1819), MP for Banbury

== See also ==
- List of things named after Frederick Douglass
