= Fallen Angels (Myers novel) =

1988 novel by Walter Dean Myers

- First edition
- Author: Walter Dean Myers
- Illustrator: Jonathan Stultz
- Genre: Young adult, war novel
- Publisher: Scholastic
- Publication date: 1988
- Publication place: United States
- Media type: Hardcover
- Pages: 323
- Awards: 1989 Coretta Scott King Author Award
- ISBN: 0-590-40942-5
- Preceded by: Crystal (1987)
- Followed by: Scorpions (1990)

Fallen Angels is a 1988 young-adult novel written by Walter Dean Myers, about the Vietnam War. It won the 1988 Coretta Scott King Award. Fallen Angels is listed as number 16 in the American Library Association's list of 100 most frequently challenged books of 1990–2000 due to its use of profanity and realistic depiction of the war.

== Influence of author's military experience on his writing ==
Walter Dean Myers was born in West Virginia in 1937. Myers's mother died three years after his birth, and his father, too poor to raise him, put him into foster care. His foster parents lived in the African-American neighborhood of Harlem in New York City, and he spent most of his childhood and young adulthood there. Though Myers describes his young life as happy—filled with basketball games, a loving upbringing, and good books—he suffered from a speech impediment that made it difficult for him to communicate with others, and at first filled him with rage. Unable to reach out verbally, Myers turned to writing, pouring out his thoughts in poems and short stories. He spent hours in the public library, reading anything he could get his hands on. By the time Myers reached high school, he knew he had intellectual potential, but also knew that his family was too poor to send him to college. Discouraged, he dropped out of school at age fifteen, and though he was persuaded to return, he dropped out again at sixteen. In 1954, on his seventeenth birthday, he joined the army.

Upon his release from the army, Myers had few job skills and little education, and he still suffered from his speech impediment. He took a job loading trucks and then worked in a number of odd jobs in places such as the New York State Department of Labor, a post office, and a rehabilitation center. Myers also kept writing throughout this time, submitting his work to various magazines and periodicals. In 1969, Myers's career received a boost when his novel Where Does a Day Go? won a contest sponsored by the Council on Interracial Books for Children. From that point on, Myers was able to support himself with his writing, turning out a large number of books for children and young adults.

== Plot summary ==
The plot follows a soldier named Perry, through his experiences in Vietnam, at war, and through his life.

== Reception ==
The novel initially received mixed reviews.

The book received the following accolades:

- South Carolina Book Award for Young Adult Book Award (1991)
- New York State Charlotte Award (1992)
- Keystone to Reading Book Award (1994)
- Coretta Scott King Book Award for Author (1989)
- Margaret A. Edwards Award (1994)

However, Fallen Angels inclusion of offensive language, racism, drugs, sexual content, and violence have made it a frequent target of censors; the novel appears on the American Library Association list of the 100 Most Frequently Challenged Books of 1990-1999 (85), 2000-2009 (11), and 2010-2019 (5). It also appeared in the annual list of the top ten most commonly banned and challenged books in 2001 (9), 2003 (5), and 2004 (2).

== Sequel and prequel ==
Published twenty years later, Myers' book Sunrise Over Fallujah (Scholastic, 2008), which follows a young U.S. soldier's experience during the 2003 invasion of Iraq, is a sequel to Fallen Angels.

Five years after that, Myers' book Invasion (Scholastic, 2013), is a prequel which covers D-Day during World War II.
