= Hate That Cat =

Verse novel by Sharon Creech

- First edition (US)
- Author: Sharon Creech
- Language: English
- Genre: Poetry
- Publisher: HarperCollins (US); Bloomsbury (UK)
- Publication date: 2008
- Publication place: United States
- Pages: 153 paperback
- Preceded by: Love That Dog

Hate That Cat is a verse novel written by Sharon Creech published by HarperCollins.

== Plot summary ==
This is the second book about Jack, the first being Love That Dog. Jack is being terrorized by a black cat. He writes poetry about how much he dislikes the cat. The story follows him through learning to like both cats and poetry.

== Reception ==
Reviews of Hate That Cat have been positive including "Teachers will welcome both Jack’s poems and Creech’s embedded writing lessons." and "Her writing style puts a story into poetic form and creates a book that appeals to reluctant readers and to children of all ages."

The book has also appeared on school reading lists.
