= Peaceworkers UK =

British organization

Peaceworkers UK (PWUK) is part of the Peace-building Issues Programme of International Alert.

== History ==
PWUK began as an independent non-governmental organisation research project in 2000 to explore the ‘civilian peace services’ being set up in six European countries. In 2001, it functioned as the secretariat for a Steering Group of UK-based organizations exploring the feasibility of a UK Civilian Peace Service. In 2002, the Steering Group decided to set up Peaceworkers UK as an independent entity to pursue these objectives.

PWUK became part of International Alert in 2006. PWUK focuses on raising standards in the field of conflict prevention, crisis management and peace-building through an integrated programme of research, training, assessment and recruitment. It is led by director Timmon Wallis who has a PhD in Peace Studies.

== Peaceworker program ==
There are four parts to the Peaceworker program.

=== Peaceworkers Register ===
The Peaceworkers Register is an international database of people suitably qualified and potentially available for a wide range of roles needed in conflict prevention, crisis management and peacebuilding. Its primary purpose is to help both local and international organisations to find and deploy the best people meeting the highest standards of professional competence in their particular field. As a professional development tool, it also helps those who join it to identify and improve their own skills and qualifications.

=== Peaceworkers Training ===
The Peaceworkers Training programme offers practical, field-based training to prepare people for the many different roles they may play in this field. There are introductory and core skill courses as well as specialised courses in human rights, conflict transformation, human security, and civil society capacity-building. Some of the more specialist courses are run under the auspices of the EU Training Project in Civilian Crisis Management.

=== Peaceworkers Simulations ===
Peaceworkers Simulations provide a means to assess people against commonly agreed minimum standards of professional competence. Observing people’s responses under simulated field conditions provides the basis for assessments at five levels of competency across a wide range of fieldwork categories.

=== Peaceworkers Research ===
The aim of Peaceworkers Research is to establish a body of knowledge about what has or has not "worked" in different situations of violent conflict. Research activities include field-based personnel assessments and surveys as well as in-house data analysis, tapping into a comprehensive network of individuals and organisations in the field. Why best placed: Peaceworkers UK is best placed to do this work because it has been developing this integrated programme of recruitment, training and assessment for the past five years and has built up an unparalleled understanding of the personal qualities, skills and knowledge needed to work effectively across a range of work categories in this field. It has already begun developing and obtaining wide agreement on a set of appropriate occupational standards together with a tried and tested methodology for training and assessing people against those standards. It has the capacity, the human resources and the know-how to achieve these objectives and is in the strongest possible position to help governments, United Nations agencies and Non-governmental organizations (NGOs) to make a real difference to the lives of millions unable to escape the causes and consequences of violent conflict in so many parts of the world.

== Partners ==
Alert's PeaceworkersUK works with a wide range of partners in the UK and Europe as well as in the rest of the world. Our closest UK partners are Saferworld, Electoral Reform International Services (ERIS), and RedR. As a member of the Peace & Security Liaison Group we also work closely with a number of other UK-based organisations working for the prevention, management and resolution of violent conflict around the world.

As a member of the European Network of Civil Peace Services, PWUK also works closely with partner organisations sharing similar aims in ten other European countries. We have partnerships with organisations working directly on their own situations of violent conflict or its aftermath in Chechnya, Moldova, Turkey, Croatia, and Georgia. Outside Europe, PWUK has a special link with the 93 member organisations of the Nonviolent Peaceforce as well as with a few specific organisations with which we have worked in Nepal, Palestine, Nigeria, Sierra Leone, and Zimbabwe.
