= Motown and Didi =

1984 novel by Walter Dean Myers

- First edition
- Author: Walter Dean Myers
- Subject: Harlem, romance
- Genre: realistic fiction
- Publisher: Viking Press
- Publication date: 1984
- Publication place: United States
- Pages: 176
- Awards: 1985 Coretta Scott King Author Award
- ISBN: 978-0-670-49062-2

Motown and Didi is a realistic fiction novel by Walter Dean Myers. It was first published in 1984 by Viking. It is centered on two African-American lovers living in Harlem, New York City, as they navigate life in the ghetto life and their romantic relationship.

== Main characters ==
Motown – One of the main character in the story. He is Didi's lover, a loner, and named after the record company, Motown.

Didi – The other main character in the story. She dreams of moving out of Harlem using her scholarship offerings and grades. Like Motown, she is a loner. She takes care of her younger brother who later dies of a drug overdose.

== Awards ==
- Coretta Scott King Author Award

== See also ==
- Harlem
- List of books set in New York City
