= Dawud Anyabwile =

African-American comic book artist

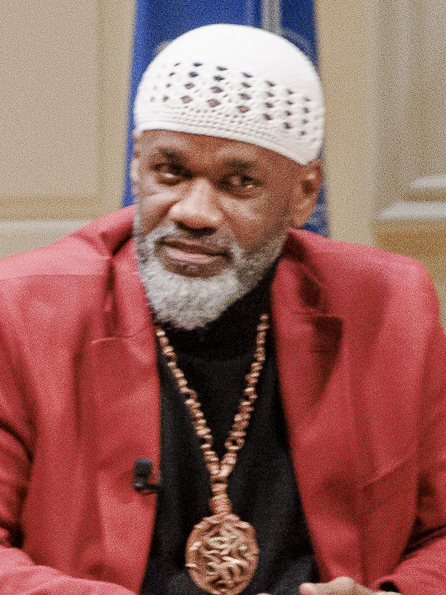
- Anyabwile in 2022
- Born: David Sims; February 6, 1965 (age 61) Philadelphia, Pennsylvania, U.S.
- Area: Artist
- Notable works: Brotherman

Dawud Osaze Kamau Anyabwile (born February 6, 1965, in Philadelphia) is an African-American comic book artist. He is the illustrator of Brotherman: Dictator of Discipline comics, and C.E.O. of Big City Entertainment. He also has an artist archive at the Auburn Avenue Research Library on African American Culture and History in Atlanta, Georgia.

== Career ==
Dawud Anyabwile graduated from Central High School of Philadelphia. After high school, he attended Mason Gross School of Arts at Rutgers University for a year (1983–84) followed by Tyler School of Art at Temple University for a year (1985).

He began his career as an artist in 1984 by airbrushing T-shirts at The Gallery Mall of Philadelphia.

In 1989, he collaborated with his brother Guy A. Sims to create and self-publish the Brotherman: Dictator of Discipline comic book series. Guy A. Sims wrote and Dawud Anyabwile illustrated eleven Brotherman: Dictator of Discipline issues. The first one was published April 1990 and the last one was published July 1996.

Anyabwile worked for WanderLust Interactive in New York City on the Pink Panther CD Rom games and for MTV on Daria in 1996. Then, he relocated to California to work for Klasky Csupo on The Wild Thornberrys and Rugrats from 1999 to 2001. Finally, he moved to Atlanta, Georgia where he landed a production designer position at Turner Studios from 2005-2013. There he created storyboards and many other forms of design work for brands such as Cartoon Network, TNT, TBS, Boomerang, Turner Sports, NBA TV and many more.

In 2015, Anyabwile once again collaborated with his brother Guy A. Sims and colorist Brian McGee to publish part one of a new graphic novel series for Brotherman: Dictator of Disciple called Revelation through Big City Entertainment.

He also illustrated Walter Dean Myer's Monster: A Graphic Novel in 2015 which is an adaptation of Walter Dean Myer's original novel, Monster. Guy A. Sims wrote the graphic novel.

== Awards ==
Year	Work	Award	Association
2016	Revelation: Brotherman - Dictator of Discipline	Best Artist	Glyph Comics Awards
2016	Revelation: Brotherman - Dictator of Discipline	Story of the Year	Glyph Comics Awards
2015		Lifetime Achievement Award	East Coast Black Age of Comics Convention
2008	Dalai Lama	Television Spot Announcements Excellence	Southeast Emmy Awards
1992	Brotherman	Outstanding Service to Children	Key to the City of Kansas City
1992	Brotherman	Best Artist	Eisner Award
