= Firebird (Copeland book) =

Picture Book

Firebird by Misty Copeland
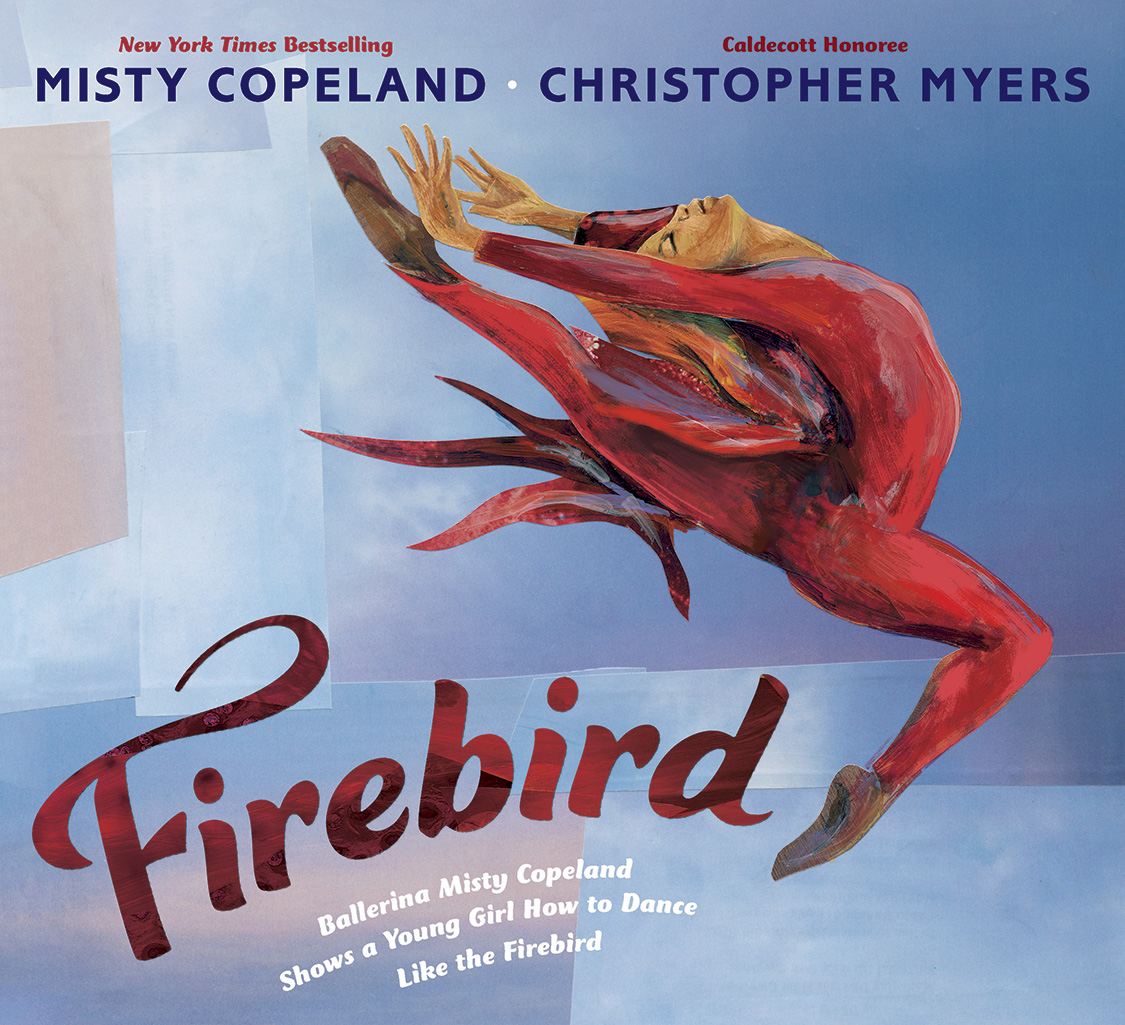
- Author: Misty Copeland
- Illustrator: Christopher Myers
- Language: English
- Genre: Children's Literature (Fiction)
- Publisher: G.P. Putnam's Sons Books for Young Readers
- Publication date: September 4, 2014
- Publication place: United States
- ISBN: 0-399-16615-7

Firebird is a children's picture book written by Misty Copeland and illustrated by Christopher Myers. It was first published on September 4, 2014. This debut book by Copeland aims to inspire young dancers, especially those from underrepresented communities in ballet.

== Background ==
Ballerina Misty Copeland rose to prominence in the American Ballet Theatre (ABT), becoming the first African American female principal dancer in 2015. This achievement was a significant moment in the history of ballet. Copeland's motivation for writing "Firebird" stemmed from her own experiences in the predominantly white ballet world, where she often felt like an outsider due to her race and body type.

== Plot ==
"Firebird" tells the story of a young, aspiring ballerina who feels overwhelmed and doubtful about her abilities in the world of dance. She looks up to a famous ballerina, seeing her as the embodiment of perfection and success. The protagonist grapples with self-confidence and fears that she may never be able to reach such heights in her dancing career.

As the narrative unfolds, a mentor modeled after Misty Copeland encourages the young girl to believe in herself. The mentor shares her own experiences, revealing that her path to success was once filled with challenges and moments of insecurity. This revelation is eye-opening for the girl, helping her to understand that perfection is not an instant achievement, but a process that involves persistence and resilience. With her mentor's guidance, the young ballerina learns to see her potential and envisages herself as the Firebird, symbolizing her transformation into an empowered character. The story emphasizes the importance of perseverance, embracing one's individuality, and the value of having a role model.

== Awards ==
- 2015, Coretta Scott King Award (Illustration Award)
