= Love That Dog =

Free verse novel by Sharon Creech

- The cover of Love That Dog by Sharon Creech
- Author: Sharon Creech
- Original title: for loving that Dog and hating that cat
- Language: English
- Genre: Tragedy, Realistic Fiction, Poetry
- Publisher: HarperCollins (US); Bloomsbury(UK)
- Publication date: 2001
- Publication place: United States
- Pages: 86 hardback 128 paperback
- ISBN: 978-0-06-029287-4
- OCLC: 45757381
- LC Class: PZ7.C8615 Lo 2001
- Followed by: Hate that Cat

Love That Dog is a free verse piece written by Sharon Creech and published by HarperCollins. It is written in diary format, in the perspective of a young boy who resists poetry assignments from his teacher. The author drew inspiration from Walter Dean Myers' poem, Love That Boy. The book received good reviews and was a finalist for the 2001 Carnegie Medal as well as being commended at the 2002 Children's Book Awards. The book has also appeared on the New York Times Best Seller list.

== Book Overview ==
=== Plot ===
Jack starts the school year insisting that "boys don't write poetry," but through the patient guidance of his teacher, Miss Stretchberry, he begins to express his grief over his lost dog, Sky. Love That Dog is composed of multiple short chapters – each chapter is listed as a diary entry. As the novel develops and Jack's confidence grows, so does his literary style. He progresses from short and defiant sentences to more sophisticated poetry. Jack writes many poems, and eventually stops being anonymous. Jack hints, but only directly tells at the end, that his dog named Sky got run over by a blue car splattered with mud speeding down the road.

=== Themes ===
The story explores the power of self-expression, the process of healing from loss, and the inspiration found in classic poets like Robert Frost, William Carlos Williams, and Walter Dean Myers .

== Acclaim ==
Beyond being a New York Times Best Seller, it earned starred reviews from Publishers Weekly and School Library Journal for its poignant yet humorous portrayal of a child's emotional journey.
