= Joss Sheldon =

British left-wing political novelist

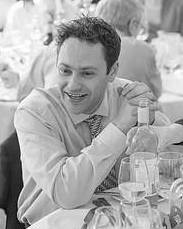
- Joss Sheldon
- Born: 7 April 1982 (age 44)
- Education: London School of Economics, University of Liverpool
- Occupation: Author
- Writing career
- Language: English
- Years active: 2014-
- Genres: Magical Realism, Historical Fiction, Epic Poetry, Political Fiction, Psychological Realism
- Subjects: Activism, Psychology, Politics, Social Issues, Occupation, Palestine, Kurdistan, Tibet, Peace, War
- Notable works: The Little Voice; Occupied; Involution & Evolution
- Website: Joss Sheldon's Official Website

Joss Sheldon (born 7 April 1982, Barnet, UK) is an author who has released six novels: Other Worlds Were Possible (2023), Individutopia (2018), Money Power Love (2017), The Little Voice (2016), Occupied (2015) and Involution & Evolution (2014). He's published three works of non-fiction: The Zionists Who Hate Jews (2026), FREEDOM: The Case For Open Borders (2024) and DEMOCRACY: A User's Guide (2020).

== Early life ==
Sheldon studied at the London School of Economics and the University of Liverpool. He worked for Burnley Football Club and Northampton Town Football Club, before becoming an author.

== Involution & Evolution ==
Involution & Evolution (2014) is an epic poem with an anti-war theme. The main protagonist, a conscientious objector during WW1, is based on Jesus and Buddha.

== Occupied ==
Occupied (2015) is a work of magical realism, inspired by the occupations of Palestine, Kurdistan and Tibet.

Sheldon told AXS that Occupied was based on the principle of divide and rule:

I believe that deep down we're all the same; we all share a common humanity; we all have hopes and dreams, strengths and weaknesses, fears and doubts. That's a truly beautiful thing. But all too often we focus on the small differences which divide us. And that, for me, is a tragedy. It's the greatest tragedy of all.

Free Tibet named Occupied as one of three books to read in 2016. The Daily Herald called it "A chilling critique of modern society". The Middle East Monitor said it had a "Simple, but strong political message".

== The Little Voice ==
The Little Voice (2016) is a work of psychological realism inspired by Sheldon's own life.

Steve Topple of The Canary called it "Top notch" and "Radical": "The Little Voice is radical, to say the least. But Sheldon's style is warm, almost whimsical at times, and this means that even the most politically uninitiated reader will understand what he's trying to say".

== Money Power Love ==
Money Power Love (2017) is a work of historical fiction which follows the lives of three men who are united by nature but divided by their different upbringings.

== Individutopia ==
Individutopia is a work of political dystopian fiction set in a time when corporations rule the roost. A small oligarch class own absolutely everything, inequality is extreme, and people have to pay to walk down the street or breathe the air. The Dallas Sun called it a "Modern classic", The Bay Net called it a "Must read", and The Canary called it "Gloriously colourful".

== The Zionists Who Hate Jews ==
The Zionists Who Hate Jews is a historical work that critically examines the foundational premise of Zionism as a movement inherently dedicated to the protection of Jewish people. Drawing on extensive documentary evidence, the book argues that, contrary to its stated purpose, Zionism has historically harmed Jewish communities and continues to do so. In eleven chapters spanning over 300 pages, Sheldon cites prominent historians such as Tom Segev and Avi Shlaim to support his central thesis, which posits that the movement's architects, including Theodor Herzl, frequently employed derogatory and antisemitic rhetoric to describe the very diaspora Jews they claimed to represent. According to a detailed review by Middle East Monitor, this contemptuous attitude is presented as a deliberate strategic foundation, intended to justify the urgent necessity of a Jewish state by first portraying Jewish life in exile as inherently degraded.

The book proceeds to explore the troubling historical alliances between early Zionists and European antisemites, whom they viewed as potential partners in facilitating Jewish emigration to Palestine. It also examines the movement's conduct during the Holocaust, particularly the controversial decisions by Zionist officials, such as Rudolf Kastner, to prioritize the establishment of a Jewish state over the immediate rescue of European Jews. The narrative further extends to the post-1948 period, detailing discriminatory policies faced by Mizrahi and Sephardi Jews within Israel, whom the book argues were marginalized and stripped of their Arab identity. Ultimately, the work contends that Zionism's actions have exacerbated antisemitism globally and fostered conflict in the Middle East, concluding that an ideology so deeply entangled with practices of racism, apartheid, and military occupation can no longer credibly claim to act in the name of Jewish safety.

== Other work ==
Sheldon has published a number of poems, which he has performed for Stop The Arms Fair.

== Bibliography ==
- Involution & Evolution. 2014. ISBN 978-1-5008-5470-6
- Occupied. 2015. ISBN 978-1-5168-2180-8
- The Little Voice. 2016. ISBN 978-1-5399-0855-5
- Money Power Love. 2017. ISBN 978-1-5399-0855-5
- Individutopia. 2018. ISBN 978-1-9763-6511-9
- DEMOCRACY: A User's Guide. 2020. ISBN 978-1-716-79206-9
- Other Worlds Were Possible. 2023. ISBN 978-3-347-75368-6
- FREEDOM: The Case For Open Borders. 2024. ISBN 979-8-8690-8453-8
- The Zionists Who Hate Jews ISBN 978-3-38487827-4

== Interviews ==
- 2019 Interview with Joss Sheldon at Cyberpunks.com
