= Theodora Wilson Wilson =

British writer and pacifist (1865–1941)

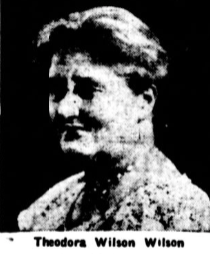
- Born: 13 January 1865; Kendal, Westmorland, UK
- Died: 8 November 1941 (aged 76); St. Albans, UK
- Occupations: Writer, pacifist
- Relatives: Samuel Bagster the Elder (great-grandfather)

Theodora Wilson Wilson (13 January 1865 – 8 November 1941) was a British writer and pacifist. She was a founding member of the Women's International League for Peace and Freedom. Her "quaint" reputation as a writer changed when she published her 1916 science fiction novel The Last Weapon, A Vision, whose anti-war message led to its being banned.

== Early life and education ==
Theodora Wilson Wilson was born in Kendal, Westmorland, the daughter of Isaac Whitwell Wilson and Anne Bagster Wilson. Her family were former Quakers; her grandfather Jonathan Bagster and great-grandfather Samuel Bagster were Bible publishers. Her older brother Horace Bagster Wilson was a noted physician. She attended Stramongate School and Croydon High School and studied music in Germany.

== Career ==
Wilson ran a Sunday school as a young woman, and founded an evening school program for working girls. Her first book was a 1900 guide to poultry keeping for women. She moved to London in 1909, and became a Quaker before World War I. Her career as a fiction writer began with her first novel, T'bacca Queen (1901). She also wrote children's books, Bible study guides, and plays, including Champion North (1931), Across Yonder (1936) and Marya.

A 1905 review of Wilson's novel Langbarrow Hall declared that she was "striving neither to be clever or unusual, but merely to write out at length a story both quaint and natural". This "quaint" reputation soon changed, as her 1916 pacifist allegorical novel The Last Weapon, A Vision has science fiction and fantasy themes, as it imagines "Hellite", an ultimate doomsday device comparable to the nuclear bomb and ICBM, and a messenger from Paradise called "the Child". The pacifist book was briefly banned as anti-war propaganda, and thousands of copies were seized by authorities. An American reviewer believed that "When the war is over it may be pointed out as one of the great books resulting from this crisis". According to an item in the Quaker weekly The Friend 22.3.1918 page 192 the police pulped 18,000 cheap copies of her book.

Wilson was a founding member of the Women's International League for Peace and Freedom, and served on the general committee of the Fellowship of Reconciliation from 1915 to 1922. She was editor of The New Crusader, a pacifist periodical, from 1917. She spoke at meetings in Trecynon and Merthyr in 1917, and at a peace rally in Bishopsgate in 1918; she also spoke at Society of Friends meetings in Manchester in 1914, 1933 and 1934, and in London in 1936.

== Legacy ==
In 2019, the Greater Manchester & District Campaign for Nuclear Disarmament crowdfunded a new edition of The Last Weapon, a Vision. The launch of the new book was supported by a talk in Manchester and a video that featured Maxine Peake.

== Selected books ==
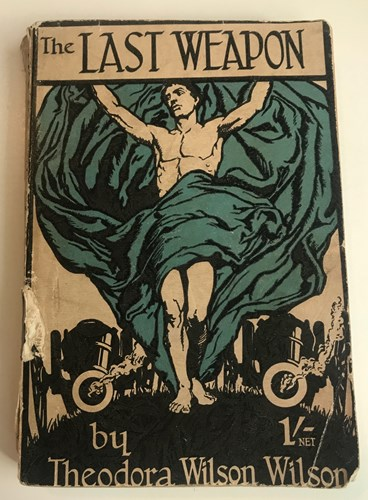
Theodora Wilson Wilson's The Last Weapon – a banned book

- Poultry Keeping for Women, for Pleasure and Profit (1900)
- T'bacca Queen (1901)
- Ursula Raven (1905)
- Langbarrow Hall (1905)
- Our Joshua (1905)
- The Magic Jujubes (1906)
- Sarah the Valiant (1907)
- The Factory Queen (1908)
- The Islanders (1910)
- The Search of the Child (1910)
- A Modern Affair (1912)
- Jim's Children (1912)
- Five of Them (1912)
- A Modern Ahab (1912)
- The Dauntless Three (1914)
- What Happened to Kitty (1916)
- Stories from the Bible (1916)
- The Last Weapon, A Vision (1916)
- The Weapon Unsheathed (1916)
- Netherdale For Ever!
- The Story of Odysseus (1921)
- The Last Dividend (1922)
- The Undaunted Trio (1923)
- Father M. P. (1923)
- Cousins in Camp (1925)
- Jerry Makes Good (1926)
- The Cousins of Faulkland (1927)
- The Strange Adventures of Billy (1927)
- The Explorer's Son (1928)
- The Laughing Band (1929)
- Pat Joins the Laughing Band (1929)
- The Parables of Our Lord (1929)
- Founders of Wat End School (1932)
- Once-upon-a-time Land (1932)
- The Lost Cup of Walla (1933)
- The Sole Survivor (1935)
- A Tale of Two Secrets (1936)
- Margot Fights Through (1936)
- Those Strange Years (1937)
- The St Berga Swimming Pool (1939)
- The Grants and Jane (1940)
- Into the Arena (1944)

== Personal life ==
Wilson died in St. Albans in 1941, aged 76 years.

== See also ==
- List of books with anti-war themes
- Pacifism in the United Kingdom
- Testimony of peace
