= Nuclear Weapons: The Road to Zero =

1998 book edited by Joseph Rotblat

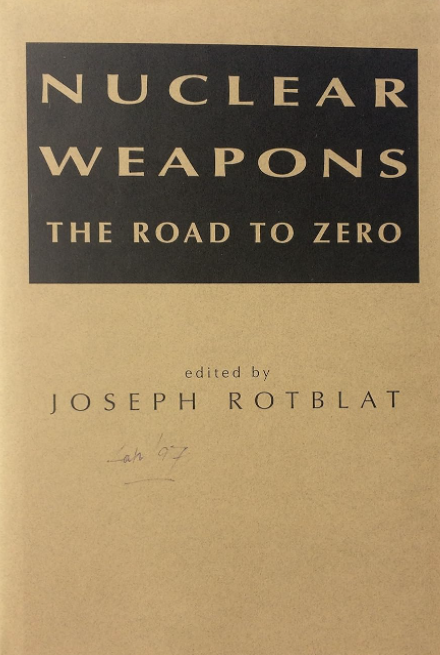
- Editor: Joseph Rotblat
- Publication date: 1998
- Pages: 344

Nuclear Weapons: The Road to Zero is a 1998 book edited by Joseph Rotblat, a Polish physicist and 1995 Nobel Peace Prize laureate.

The book has 344 pages.

== See also ==
- List of books about nuclear issues
- List of books with anti-war themes
- Nuclear disarmament
- Anti-nuclear movement
