= Timmon Wallis =

American peace activist

Timmon Wallis is an American author, peace activist, and advocate of nuclear disarmament. As of 2024, he is the executive director of Nuclearban.us and the coordinator of the American Warheads to Windmills coalition.

== Biography ==
=== Education ===
Wallis has as BA in Human Ecology and a PhD in Peace Studies.

=== Career ===
Wallis has worked with UK organizations Peace Brigades International, Peaceworkers UK, Nonviolent Peaceforce (as executive director), and Peace & Disarmament for Quaker Peace & Social Witness. He spent 7 years camped outside of a nuclear base in England.

Wallis has been an advocate for the Treaty on the Prohibition of Nuclear Weapons which in 2017 outlawed the use of nuclear weapons internationally.

Wallis has directed peacebuilding projects in Colombia, Guatemala, Mexico, Northern Ireland, Kosovo, Georgia, Myanmar, Chechnya, Croatia, Sri Lanka, the Philippines, and South Sudan.

His publications include Disarming the Nuclear Argument; The Truth About Trident: Disarming the Nuclear Argument; and Warheads to Windmills: Preventing Climate Catastrophe and Nuclear War. He often coincides his books with training workshops in collaboration with organizations like Christian CND, Fellowship of Reconciliation, and Pax Christi.

Wallis partnered with the International Campaign to Abolish Nuclear Weapons and published his book (likely Warheads to Windmills) shortly before the organization won the Nobel Peace Prize.

=== Personal life ===
In 2024, New England Public Media stated that Timmon Wallis and Vicki Elson are both authors, activists, and "nobel prize winners for their work on nuclear [dis]armament who fell in love with each other through the cause".

== See also ==
- List of peace activists
- List of books with anti-war themes
- Quaker peace testimony
- Anti-war movement
