= Christopher Myers =

American author and artist (born 1974)

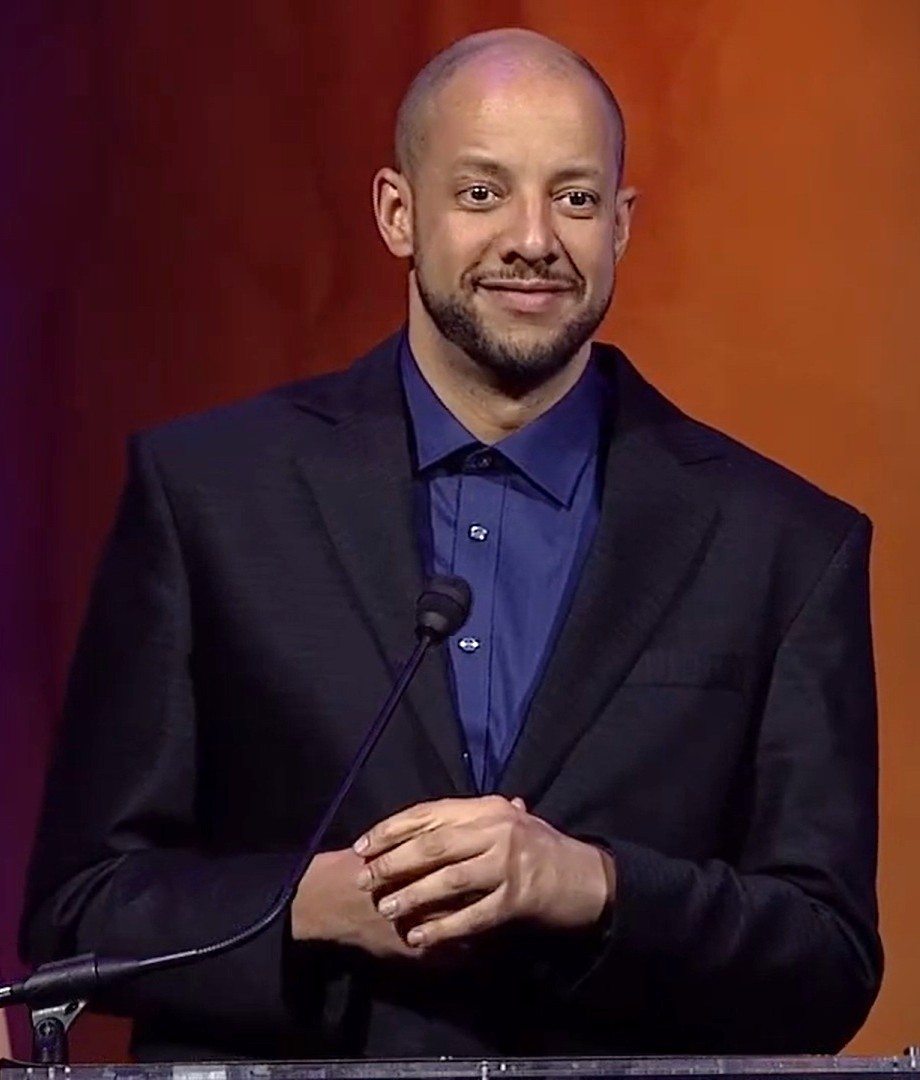
- Myers in 2015
- Born: 1974 (age 51–52); New York City, US
- Education: Brown University
- Known for: Tapestries, sculpture, stained-glass works, illustration, theater
- Awards: Caldecott Honor (1998); Coretta Scott King Award (2015); BRIC Arts Media (2019)
- Website: www.kalyban.com

Christopher Myers (born 1974) is an American interdisciplinary artist, author and illustrator of children's books, and playwright. His wide-ranging practice—including tapestries, sculpture, stained glass lightboxes, theater and writing—is rooted in storytelling and artmaking as modes of transformation and cultural exchange. He explores contemporary hybrid cultures and identities resulting from histories of migration (chosen and forced), globalization and colonization. Critics have noted his work's fluid movement between disciplines, image and language, sociopolitical research and mythology, and diverse materials. Shana Nys Dambrot of LA Weekly wrote, "Ideas about authorship, collaboration, cross-cultural pollination, intergenerational storytelling, mythology, literature and the oral histories of displaced communities all converge in his literal and metaphorical patchwork tableaux ... [his] sharp, emotional and sometimes dark parables express it all in bright, jubilant patterns and saturated colors."

Christopher Myers, Sarah Forbes Bonetta as Omoba Aina as Persephone, appliqué textile, 108" x 408", 2021

His work has been presented at venues including MoMA PS1, Kennedy Center, the Art Institute of Chicago and Institute of Contemporary Art, Philadelphia. He has received a BRIC Arts Media prize and the American Library Association's Caldecott Honor and Coretta Scott King Award for his book illustration. Myers is based in Brooklyn, New York.

== Life and career ==
Christopher Dean Myers was born in 1974 in Queens, New York. He attended Brown University, earning a BA in Art-Semiotics and American Civilization in 1995, and participated in the Whitney Museum of Art Independent Studio Program in 1996.

Myers is the son of well-known children's book author Walter Dean Myers (1937–2014). They began collaborating in the mid-1990s, with Myers illustrating his father's books, and later, co-writing several with him. He began to publish his own self-illustrated books with Black Cat in 1999, continuing through My Pen (2015). In 2000, he began to exhibit his art. He has appeared in surveys including "Greater New York" (MoMA PS1, 2005), the Prospect New Orleans Biennial (2014), Biennial of Graphic Arts (Ljubljana) (2017), and the 2021 Desert X Biennial. He has had solo exhibitions at the Studio Museum in Harlem, the Akron Art Museum, Fort Gansevoort, James Cohan Gallery, and the Blaffer Art Museum. Since 2014, he has also collaborated on film, performance and theater works as a designer, writer and director, with artists such as Kaneza Schaal and Hank Willis Thomas.

== Work and public reception ==
Myers's art centers on how different elements—visual symbols, fabric patterns and paper fragments, words, narratives—are put together, rather than on the particulars of materials, objects or mediums. This approach creates a common thread across his work, from the visual patchworks of collaged illustrations and appliqué tapestries to the conceptual juxtapositions of cultures, myths, stories and experiences in his books, plays and artwork. Collaboration with communities and artisans (e.g., textile, glasswork, shadow puppet or instrument makers) around the world also plays a key role, enabling him to connect seemingly isolated geographies, histories, data points, generations and identities, while questioning the traditional narrative of the sole artist.

== Artwork ==
Christopher Myers, Earth, appliqué textile, 2020

=== Tapestries ===
Tapestries have figured significantly in Myers's art. The brightly colored, intricately patterned work draws upon influences including the innovative Quilts of Gee's Bend and simple cutouts of Henri Matisse, the figurative work of Jacob Lawrence, and global regional forms. His exhibitions at The Mistake Room (2017, Guadalajara) included collaborations with Vietnamese embroiderers on images inspired by Lil Wayne rap songs and the "Vxllrncgnt" project—mural-like flags for imaginary nations made from 70-year-old Egyptian sails that were influenced by the colonial history of flags created by the Ghanaian Fante people. Myers's tapestries notably mix dissonant modes of tradition—an intimate, quotidian and "warm, folksy art form"—and critique, chronicling difficult narratives, involving, for example, Confederate monuments, slavery, police violence or climate crisis.

Myers's titled his 2019 exhibition at Fort Gansevoort, "Drapetomania", referencing a supposed and debunked 19th-century pseudoscientific theory that posited enslaved Africans' impulse to escape bondage as a mental illness. Los Angeles Times critic Leah Ollman wrote that its monumental tapestries "conceive a kind of emblematic space, part proclamatory banner, part illusionistic window to the world. The most affecting works visualize some sort of existential reckoning, a claiming of place, voice, liberty." What Does It Mean To Matter (Community Autopsy) (2019) was a 14-foot wide group portrait of nine recent victims of police violence, each a silhouette in umber, crimson or ochre cloth modeled after coroners' autopsy sheets and embellished only with yellow and red shapes marking the bullet wounds that killed them. In his 34-foot textile mural, Sarah Forbes Bonetta as Omoba Aina as Persephone (2021), Myers depicted the diasporic dislocations of a 19th-century Yoruba princess (Bonetta) who was orphaned and enslaved in a regional war, given to the British as a diplomatic gift, raised as Queen Victoria's ward, and finally married to a wealthy industrialist. The tapestry's layered analogies connect her hybrid identity to colonial history and the Greek goddess Persephone, who was given away to Hades, god of the underworld.

=== Sculpture ===
Christopher Myers, Nat Turner, stained glass, 90.125" x 45.125", 2022.

Myers's sculpture similarly explores cross-cultural and trans-historical narratives and links. The mixed-media collaboration Echo in the Bones (2014, Prospect.3) examined grief rituals in Vietnam and New Orleans connected through the global tradition of jazz. It combined photographs, a Saigon–New Orleans jazz funeral march and re-imagined, fantastical brass instruments and costumes created by Myers that were used in a film by the Vietnamese collective The Propeller Group. In his Desert X installation, The Art of Taming Horses (2021), Myers collapsed the forgotten histories of Mexican and African-American cowboys in a fictional story of two ranchers told through vibrant, mythic tapestries and large-scale steel horse sculptures. Both projects featured elements fabricated by artists and craftspeople from around the world, complicating the work with considerations of cultural exchange, authorship and identity.

In other sculptures, Myers has combined resonant objects and materials (e.g., figurines, ink, a face cage, microscopes) to evoke and transform trauma. Shackle and Light (2019) consisted of a thick metal collar encircling the neck of a featureless, carved wooden head with extending rods that housed dozens of periodically lit candles, transforming a symbol of oppression into a flickering chandelier signifying resistance.

=== Stained glass ===
Myers's shows "The Hands of Strange Children" (2022, James Cohan) and "of all creatures that can feel and think" (Blaffer Art Museum, 2023) featured stained glass lightboxes alongside tapestries and sculpture. The stained glass works melded religious iconography (and a medium associated with sacred Christian spaces) with reconceived mythology to exalt historical anti-colonialist figures that Myers has called "failed prophets." Nat Turner (2022) depicted the African-American insurgent in a moment of divine revelation inspired by the pose from Caravaggio's Conversion on the Way to Damascus (1600); in Nongqawuse (2022), the Xhosa prophet sits upon a horned bull in a restaging of the Greek myth of Zeus and Europa. In 2022, Myers created the stained-glass work Be Lost Well (Stay in the House All Day) for the Brooklyn Academy of Music, which paid tribute to interdisciplinary artist Ralph Lemon.

== Theatrical collaborations ==
Christopher Myers, shadow puppet from theatre and dance production Fire in the Head, 2022.

Myers has collaborated on works in theater, dance, opera and film. His work with Kaneza Schaal includes Go/Forth (2016, Performance Space New York), a work on mourning written by Schaal and designed by Myers; Jack & (2018, Brooklyn Academy of Music) and Cartography (2019, Kennedy Center), written and designed by Myers and directed by Schaal; and Schaal's KLII (2022, Walker Art Center), which Myers designed and co-directed. Jack & examined incarceration and re-entry into society through a single character and was presented with Myers's accompanying video installation, The Cotillion. Cartography emerged from their work with migrant children around the world and took a nonlinear look at the widespread, shared experience of migration.

For his theater and dance performance Fire in the Head (2022, Crossing the Line), Myers worked with Indonesian master craftspeople to create shadow puppets that depicted inner conflicts revealed in the diaries of renowned dancer and choreographer Vaslav Nijinsky. He worked with artist Hank Willis Thomas on Am I Going Too Fast? (2014, Sundance), an experimental short film about poverty, the global aid industry and the rapid rise of technology in Kenya. Myers was also the production designer for the opera Omar (2022, Spoleto Festival, LA Opera) by composers Rhiannon Giddens and Michael Abels, about 19th-century Muslim scholar Omar ibn Said.

== Illustration and writing ==
Myer's work as an illustrator and author have been recognized by the American Library Association (ALA) and Cooperative Children’s Book Center. He received a Caldecott Honor for illustration for Harlem (1998) and a Coretta Scott King Honor for Jazz (2007), both written by his father, Walter Dean Myers. He also received Coretta Scott King Honors for illustration for two of his own books, Black Cat (2000) and H.O.R.S.E. (2013). In 2015, his illustrations for Firebird by Misty Copeland won a Coretta Scott King Award.

Myers's illustration has combined painting, photography and collage. In a 2000 New York Times review of Myers's book, Wings, Michael Emberley wrote that over the course of several books, his work evolved from dense oil on cut-paper images to heavily worked photos to seemingly hasty cut-paper pieces with "a fresh, urban look, bringing to mind the great collage artist Romare Bearden" or the "confidence and brashness of a hip young Matisse." Patricia J. Williams wrote of the collection, Lies and Other Tall Tales (2005): Myers's "collages of paper and fabric, are visual plays and puns in their own right. If the tales Hurston collected are wry and absurd, Myers's depictions give that absurdity a gorgeously kinetic vivacity beyond words."

Myers has also contributed essays about uneven racial representation in children's book publishing and the public violence experienced by youth of color to The New York Times and The Horn Book Magazine. In 2016, he founded an imprint, Make Me a World, with Random House Children’s Books, in part to address the lack of racial and cultural diversity in children’s publishing.

Myers's published work as an illustrator includes:

- The Shadow of the Red Moon (by Walter Dean Myers), New York: Scholastic Press, 1995
- Harlem: A Poem (by Walter Dean Myers), New York: Scholastic Press, 1997
- Monster (by Walter Dean Myers), New York: HarperCollins, 1999
- Blues Journey (by Walter Dean Myers), New York: Holiday House, 2001
- A Time to Love: Stories from the Old Testament, (by Walter Dean Myers), New York: Scholastic Press, 2003
- Autobiography of My Dead Brother (by Walter Dean Myers), New York: HarperCollins, 2005
- Love: Selected Poems (by E. E. Cummings), New York: Hyperion Books, 2005
- Jazz (by Walter Dean Myers), New York: Holiday House, 2006
- Looking Like Me (written by Walter Dean Myers), New York: Egmont USA, 2009
- Firebird (by Misty Copeland), New York: G.P. Putnam's Sons, 2014
- Jake Makes a World: Jacob Lawrence, A Young Artist in Harlem (by Sharifa Rhodes-Pitts), New York: Museum of Modern Art, 2015
- Into the Uncut Grass (by Trevor Noah), New York: Penguin Random House, 2023

Myers's published work as an author and illustrator include:

- Black Cat, New York: Scholastic Press, 1999
- Wings, New York: Scholastic Press, 2000
- Fly!, New York: Jump at the Sun/Hyperion Books, 2001
- Lies and Other Tall Tales (stories collected by Zora Neale Hurston, adapted by Myers), New York: HarperCollins, 2005
- Jabberwocky (poem by Lewis Carroll, reinterpreted by Myers), New York: Jump at the Sun/Hyperion Books, 2007
- We Are America: A Tribute from the Heart (co-written with Walter Dean Myers), New York: HarperCollins, 2011
- H.O.R.S.E.: A Game of Basketball and Imagination, New York: Egmont USA, 2012
- My Pen, New York: Disney Hyperion Books, 2015

== Collections ==
Myers's artwork belongs to the public collections of the National Gallery of Art, Brooklyn Museum, National Museum of African American History and Culture, and Museum of Contemporary Art Chicago, among others. Myers's art belongs to the public collections of the Ackland Art Museum, Brooklyn Museum, Los Angeles County Museum of Art, Mead Art Museum, Museum of Contemporary Art Chicago, Nasher Museum of Art, National Gallery of Art, National Museum of African American History and Culture, Pérez Art Museum Miami, Rubell Museum, The Studio Museum in Harlem, and US Department of State, among others.

== Awards and recognition ==
He has received a BRIC Arts Media prize (2019), an Art for Justice Fund grant (2018), and an artist residency at San Art Laboratory (2013, Vietnam). In 2018, he created the commissioned billboard Mayflowers (2018, Maine) as part of the For Freedoms "50 State Initiative" promoting political participation, and in 2020 created My Body is a Burning House, a billboard for Walls for a Cause NYC.
