= Fast Sam, Cool Clyde, and Stuff =

1975 novel by Walter Dean Myers

- First edition
- Authors: Walter Dean Myers
- Language: English
- Genre: Young adult fiction,
- Published: 1975 (Viking Press)
- Publication place: United States
- Media type: Print (hardback, paperback)
- Pages: 190
- ISBN: 0-670-30874-9
- OCLC: 1173781

Fast Sam, Cool Clyde, and Stuff is a 1975 novel by Walter Dean Myers. It is about a boy, Stuff, moving to 116th Street Harlem, making friends with the neighborhood kids and the adventures they have.

== Reception ==
Kirkus Reviews in its review of Fast Sam wrote "Stuff can be a little long-winded in Holden Caulfield-like digressions, and his friends awfully earnest in their discussions of sex and drugs, but in general his colloquial first-person narrative projects a sense of enviable group rapport with an easy mix of nostalgia and humor." and the New York Public Library called it "a fun, relaxing read."

Fast Sam has also been reviewed by Common Sense Media, and the School Library Journal.

The Washington Post included Fast Sam in its list of recommended books celebrating the black experience. It also received a 1976 Coretta Scott King Award author honor.
