= Eisner Award for Best Artist =

American comic book award

- Awarded for: Best Arist
- Country: United States
- First award: 1988
- Website: www.comic-con.org/awards/eisner-awards/

The Eisner Award for Best Artist was an award for "creative achievement" in American comic books. It was given out in 1988, 1989, 1991, and 1992.

The successor award is the Eisner Award for Best Penciller/Inker or Penciller/Inker Team, which has been given out since 1993.

== Winners and nominees ==
Year	Nominee	Titles	Ref.
1980s
1988	Steve Rude	Nexus (First Comics)	
1988	Paul Chadwick	Concrete (Dark Horse Comics)	
1988	Todd McFarlane	The Incredible Hulk (Marvel Comics)	
1988	Ted McKeever	Eddy Current (Mad Dog Graphics)	
1988	George Pérez	Wonder Woman (DC Comics)	
1988	John Totleben	Miracleman (Eclipse Comics)	
1989	Brian Bolland	Batman: The Killing Joke (DC Comics)	
1989	Robert Crumb	Weirdo (Last Gasp)	
1989	Todd McFarlane	The Amazing Spider-Man (Marvel Comics)	
1989	Dave McKean	Black Orchid (DC Comics)	
1989	Steve Rude	Nexus (First Comics)	
1989	Mark Schultz	Xenozoic Tales (Kitchen Sink Press)	
1990s
1990	There was no Eisner Award ceremony, or awards distributed, in 1990, due to widespread balloting mix-ups.		
1991 (Note: Nominees for Artist did not have associated titles in 1991.)	Steve Rude		
1991	Dan Brereton		
1991	Geof Darrow		
1991	Drew Friedman		
1991	Ted McKeever		
1991	P. Craig Russell		
1991	Mark Schultz		
1992	Simon Bisley	Batman/Judge Dredd: Judgment on Gotham (DC Comics)	
1992	Sergio Aragonés	Groo the Wanderer (Marvel Comics/Epic Comics)	
1992	David Chelsea	David Chelsea in Love (Eclipse Comics)	
1992	Paul Chadwick	Concrete (Dark Horse Comics)	
1992	Will Eisner	To the Heart of the Storm (Kitchen Sink Press)	
1992	Jose Luis Garcia-Lopez	Twilight (DC Comics)	
1992	Frank Miller	"Sin City" in Dark Horse Presents (Dark Horse Comics)	
1992	David Sims	Brotherman: Dictator of Discipline (Big City Comics)	
