= Cartography (play) =

Play by Kaneza Schaal and Christopher Myers

- Original language: English
- Written by: Christopher Myers
- Genre: Documentary

Premiere
- Date: January 2019
- Place: Kennedy Center, Washington, D.C.
- Directed by: Kaneza Schaal
- Original run: 2019-2020

Cartography is a play directed by Kaneza Schaal and written by Christopher Myers. Via a nonlinear narrative, it centers on a small group of refugees who express stories about themselves throughout the story. It premiered at the Kennedy Center in 2019 before touring through several American cities later that year and in 2020. Critics praised it for its story and technological aspects, but had mixed feelings on the tone.

== Overview ==
Cartography normally focuses on four or five refugees from situations such as political repression, poverty, and warfare, who "as an ensemble ... touch on themes including identity, bureaucracy, family, and hope." The refugees appear in a waiting room where they are interviewed and filling out forms, before the setting moves into an inflatable raft, "the kind that desperate people pile into, trying to reach a new land". During the interlude, the audience is invited to contribute their familial migrant journeys to a user-generated map on the stage. Towards the end, the refugees break the fourth wall by discussing their personal experiences, particularly their migrant backgrounds.

Cartography uses a nonlinear narrative structure connecting "interweaving fragments and hopscotching around countries and timelines". The January 2020 preshow started with a montage of global music such as K'naan's "T.I.A." and Stromae's "Tous les mêmes".

== Production ==
Cartography was conceived by Christopher Myers, who wrote and designed the show, and Kaneza Schaal, who directed it; it was their third collaboration, with the previous two being Go Forth (2016) and Jack &. The two had been inspired to create Cartography after their experiences in Munich seeing a Malian boy making music, with Myers recalling that "in that playful little-boy game, there was also all of the weight and all of the tragedy and all of his reason for being in Munich ... from the point of view of a 12-year-old boy who has been on a greater adventure than most adults have ever been on." The play also drew inspiration from the duo's work with young refugees who shared with them their experiences through "a variety of tools, including map-making, storytelling and filmmaking". Schaal called Cartography an attempt to "centralize the hero's journey in everyone's story" amidst anti-immigration sentiment. It was also intended to expand beyond polarized views on migrants.

Cartography's world premiere took place at the Kennedy Center in January 2019. It was later performed at the Philadelphia Fringe Festival in September 2019 and at the Ohio Theatre in November 2019. It was performed at the New Victory Theater in New York City in January 2020. It was performed at the New York University Abu Dhabi Arts Centre in partnership with United Nations High Commissioner for Refugees, and made available on the Young People's Theatre's Facebook page for a limited time in June 2020. Cartography has usually relied on student groups for cast and crew; for example NYU Abu Dhabi graduate students, including some specializing in fields like interactive media, worked on several productions' special effects.

The 2019 Philadelphia show had five actors playing the refugees, as did the show in Cleveland. In the 2020 New York City performance, there were four actors playing the refugees: Janice Amaya, Noor Hamdi, Victoria Nassif, and Malaika Uwamahoro.

Aimed at children of at least ten years of age, Cartography was Schaal's first experience with children's theater. The 2019 Philadelphia performance was marketed as advertised for all ages.

== Reception ==
Elisabeth Vincentelli of The New York Times praised the New York City performance, remarking "it was thrilling to simply see the many trajectories that brought a bunch of strangers together at a matinee on West 42nd Street," but criticized its approach towards themes like hope and optimism as "perhaps to a fault". Natalie Rine of OnStage Blog remarked that the performance, instead of being "a sad, heavy drama for a wannabe-escapist-pat-yourself-on-the-back white (Broadway) audience, [is] as fresh, real, pulsing, and in your face as the high BPMs of the preshow playlist". Dave Rabjohn of OnStage Blog praised the NYU Abu Dhabi performance's acting for its tendency to "parade through a series of questions meant to examine issues of refugee plight", as well as the humour and cultural references, but criticized some it as appearing to be "somewhat forced as seen in a bumpy finale".

Rine said that, in contrast to the misery porn endemic in contemporary refugee stories, the play's writing "pierces through the political or otherwise tainted noise, anchoring their original story in a messy reality with the bluntness of youth." Rabjohn remarked that the play uses shoes as an important theme of the play, noting that the actors would become barefoot while they travel and that the tendency to wear only one shoe is connected to the displaced nature of refugees.

Critics have focused on the technological aspect of Cartography. Rabjohn noted that the technological aspect stands out due to its use of graduate student experiences with computer technology to produce "striking effects enriching the stories of loss, hope, and solidarity". The actors also use acoustic sensors to change the projected sea level which, according to Laura Collins-Hughes, "inverts the experience of migrants who find themselves, perilously, at the mercy of the water they cross".
