= War Porn =

2016 novel by Roy Scranton

- War Porn (2016), Dust jacket cover
- Author: Roy Scranton
- Language: English
- Publisher: Soho Press
- Publication date: 2016
- ISBN: 978-1-61695-715-5 (first edition, hardcover)
- Dewey Decimal: 813.6
- LC Class: PS3619.C743 W37

War Porn is an anti-war novel by Roy Scranton completed in 2011 and published in 2016 by Soho Press.

The novel presents structurally integrated stories told through the third- and first-person perspectives, which present contrasting and complex perspectives on the Iraq war.

Scranton served with the US Army from 2002 to 2006, and was deployed as a specialist with the 1st Armored Division to Baghdad in 2003 and 2004. The term "war porn" refers to graphic images of violence collected in war zones, often "viewed voyeuristically for emotional gratification".

== Structure ==
"[That] these three kinds of narratives…are usually isolated genres suggests something about the way we compartmentalize our imagination in response to the complexities and contradictions of living inside the American empire…My intention in juxtaposing these three narratives was to give shape to these contradictions…I want to make them visible so we can talk them out instead of acting them out, as we so often do, through politics and political violence. - Novelist Roy Scranton, interview with Hilary Plum in The Fanzine, September 26, 2016.

War Porn is set prior to and during the Iraq War. The novel presents three main storylines that are divided into five sections, resembling the configuration of "Russian nesting dolls." (A-B-C-B-A.) The intertwining narratives revolve around the US invasion and occupation of Iraq in the early years of the war and its impact on American and Iraqi soldiers and civilians.

"Strange Hells" comprises the "A" narrative, sections 1 and 5. The author employs a limited omniscient third-person point-of-view, and is set in a Utah suburb. Focal characters include Aaron "Sto" Stojanoski, a recently discharged corporal in the National Guard whose Military Police unit was deployed to Iraq in 2003 and stationed at Camp Crawford and the Abu Ghraib detention center. Dahlia, identified only by her first name, is a disaffected suburban housemate and a key protagonist in this homefront narrative.

"Your Leader Will Control Your Fire" comprises the "B" narrative (sections 2 and 4, set in Baghdad in 2003 and 2004). The story is presented from a first-person confessional point-of-view. The protagonist is Army Specialist Wilson. Identified only by his rank and last name, he serves as a Humvee driver in combat zones in Baghdad. The "B" narrative dealing with Wilson is fragmented into vignette-like chapters, each two or three pages in length. The chapters are introduced with an epigraph which quotes from the U.S. Army Ethics and Combat Skills Handbook and the M16 Weapon Manual.

The "B" narrative is the only story that incorporates flashbacks: these are signaled by their presentation in italics. All the events described in Wilson's flashbacks are set in the United States.

"The Fall" is the single "C" section occurring sequentially at the mid-point of the other narratives. The author employs an omniscient third-person point-of-view. The central character is Qasim al-Zabadi, an Iraqi university mathematics professor living with his extended family in Baghdad and Baquba during the war; he later serves as an interpreter for US occupation forces.

=== The Babylon "prose-poems" ===
Each of the five sections in the novel are preceded by a unique "prose-poem", all uniformly entitled "Babylon". These stream of consciousness-like passages are amalgamations of the "fables, lies, half-truths, myths, delusions, and anxieties that underwrote the Iraq War" and include references to operations conducted by US military intelligence during the war.

== Plot Summaries ==
=== Strange Hells (Columbus Day, 2004): "A" narrative (Section 1) ===
The novel opens at the suburban home of Dahlia and Matt, both Gen-Xers. A monogamous heterosexual couple, they have been co-habitating in the US state of Utah since 2002. Their relationship is quietly deteriorating. Dahlia is discontented with the domestic role she has drifted into with Matt, but seems resigned to it. A former all-state soccer champion in college with a Master's degree in Anthropology, she works part-time in a bagel shop.

Matt is employed part-time as a freelance computer programmer. An introvert, he suffers from low self-esteem, and unlike Dahlia, he is no longer physically fit. He attempts to conceal his mild yet chronic dependence on marijuana and alcohol.

The couple has invited a few local friends to their holiday barbecue. Like themselves, they are self-absorbed, politically liberal twenty-somethings, with New Age affinities. Preoccupied with their own personal and professional uncertainties, they are ignorant of the realities related to the invasion and occupation of Iraq, and the experiences of US and allied troops. Dahlia laments to herself that "wars drag on."

Rachel and Mel (Melanie), a lesbian couple, arrive with their Labrador retriever, Zena. Mel, a recreational boat guide, immediately harangues her hosts with an outraged Leftist critique against mainstream America. Rachel, a public school teacher and avid attendee at Rainbow Gathering-like vegan events, complains that the school board is persecuting her for her lesbian "lifestyle." Mel, in her defense, launches into a tirade against the "Fucking homophobic, misogynistic bigots" and proposes they seek sanctuary in Canada if President George W. Bush is reelected in the 2004 elections. Dahlia and Matt also consider absconding to Canada.

Wendy, a friend of Dahlia, calls to say she is bringing a new boyfriend, Aaron. Matt, who has a secret crush on Wendy, remarks disparagingly on her penchant for "lost boys." As a liberal critic of the US invasion of Iraq, Matt becomes anxious when informed that Aaron is a soldier returning from combat duty in Baghdad. Dahlia warns Matt that the war veteran may be "a little sensitive." Matt expresses a lurid interest in viewing genuine combat photos he hopes Aaron may possess. (Such images are the "war porn" of the novel's title.)

Matt is instantly intimidated by Aaron's steely self-possession, and drinks a beer to steady his nerves. Delia is attracted to the danger Aaron evinces. Matt pontificates on the topic of computer coding to Aaron, who responds with mock interest. Aaron doesn't bother to conceal his instant attraction to Dahlia.

Dahlia distributes marijuana and beer to her guests. The conversation is initially confined to topics that avoid direct reference to the War in Iraq: "...cats v. dogs…how to best marinate tofu…" Tattoos are compared, revealing a jaguar modeled on an Aztec horoscope; a fleur-de-lis; a flaming skull with several barbed tribal bands. Aaron displays his tattoo, depicted in Gothic design across his back: "LONG IS THE WAY AND HARD." Matt and Rachel sport no body art. Dahlia is too modest to show her tiny hip tattoo, a dahlia. Wendy relates a "weird" experience, laced with New Age memes, concerning a highway encounter with a phantom coyote. During the telling, Matt lusts after Wendy, but observes that Aaron is seducing Dahlia. Mel abruptly confronts Aaron: "Tell us something about yourself…What's your deal?" Aaron provides them with a guarded and benign autobiographical sketch. Matt pursues the interrogation: "Didn't you just get out of the Army?…what did you do there. I mean, if you don't mind me asking." Dahlia gently admonishes Matt for this line of questioning. Neither Matt nor Mel guess the impact of the war on Aaron. He has witnessed and participated in predatory behavior and sexual humiliation toward detainees while serving at a military detention center in Iraq.

Matt, clearly intoxicated, wants to discuss the "moral imperatives" of post-9/11. Aaron suggests they drop the Iraq war as a topic, explaining "Iraq's a fucking disaster…the guys who run shit don't give a rat's ass what people like you and me think (italics). Or say. Or do…" This provokes a self-righteous outburst from Mel, who interprets Aaron's cynicism as a disparagement of her anti-war pretensions. Infuriated, she launches into a verbal assault labeling Aaron "an American Nazi." She persists: "Did you kill anybody…well, did you?" Aaron demurs: no, "I just held the camera." Dismissing Mel as a "bitch," Aaron stands up to leave the gathering, but Mel jabs at his chest demanding a confession. When Aaron shoves her away, Xena snaps at him and he kicks the dog. Rachel and Dahlia pull the now hysterical Mel away from Aaron.

Aaron walks away accompanied by Matt. Mel and Zena are comforted by Rachel. Only Dahlia expresses compassion for Aaron: "He's a soldier who just got back from a war zone. He's a person." Dahlia is troubled by her furtive yet powerful sexual desire for Aaron.

=== Your Leader Will Control Your Fire (Operation Iraqi Freedom, 2003): "B" narrative, (section 2) ===
US Army Specialist Wilson is a Humvee driver for his unit's Battery Commander in the early months of the Iraq War. Wilson, a well-read youth who has dreams of becoming a poet, quickly grasps that he is a member of a foreign occupying force, despised by much of the Iraqi population. Like his comrades, he is indoctrinated into regarding all civilians as potential enemy combatants.

Burnt and rotting Iraqis corpses litter the approach to a US military compound. Driving for eighteen consecutive hours, Wilson begins to hallucinate.

Flashback: The convoy troops are transported to Camp Connecticut, a remote, entirely undeveloped military compound: "No running water. No electricity. No AC..." Tubs of human fecal matter are incinerated with diesel fuel, stirred with a stick. Wilson's indoctrination includes are PowerPoint pep talks, tasking his unit with "protecting America from the insidious evils of terrorism and Islamic Fundamentalism that now threaten our way of life."

Wilson and his comrades are plagued by venomous spiders, scorpions, flies and biting ants. Wild dogs roam free. The soldiers pit spiders and scorpions against one another in miniature cockfights. After nightfall, a Military Police unit reports a weapons cache and urgently requests backup. Captain Yarrow (Battery Commander) Lieutenant Krausse and Sergeant Perry lead several Humvees to locate the MPs. Wilson is driving the lead vehicle. The officers become hopelessly lost shortly after leaving the compound. Dispatchers at the Command Post are ignorant of their location. The Humvees descend into a labyrinth of residential housing. The passage is blocked by a braying donkey and cart. Captain Yarrow: "You can't even read a fucking map!" The MPs secure the cache after a fight, and cancel the request for support. Captain Yarrow discovers that he has lost his sidearm. At three in the morning, after retracing their routes that evening, the Battery Commander's 9mm automatic is located next the cart and donkey: "Good work, men. Let's go home."

Wilson is stationed at Camp Lancer near Sadr City. His combat duty becomes a cycle of urban patrols and endless viewings of DVDs off duty. Wilson is resigned to death and inured to the daily violence.: "I was a soldier and this was my fucking job and I would damn well try to die with a little dignity." When reports of Improvised explosive devices in roadways snarl traffic, Wilson uses his Humvee to plow paths through Iraqi civilian vehicles. He begins to experience urban warfare as a welcome distraction. Wilson discovers that he is unable to respond to a letter from a girlfriend in the USA, a world that he now regards as alien to his present existence. Her letter seems "an artifact from hyperspace."

Captain Yarrow takes his unit to the United Nations compound to eat at the cafeteria. Wilson is "dazed" by the fine foods offered at the buffet, the "smiling servers" and the "gleaming elegance" of the dinner ware. He indulges in fantasies in which he is distinguished from the "thugs" in his unit and associates with sophisticated and cosmopolitan "UN types."

Flashback: Wilson recalls his basic training under the guidance of Drill Sergeant Krupman. Wilson's professed reason for joining in 2002 is simply "Nine-eleven!"

A number of soldiers in Wilson's unit are beginning to exhibit PTSD and are demoted or hospitalized. Wilson is working a detail overseeing security on local laborers who served as truck drivers. He and his comrades loath the Iraqis civilians. A "hadjis" worker is caught stealing several rounds of 9mm ammunition. He and other Iraqis are rounded up and handed over to a Military Police prison facility. A corporal nicknamed "Sto" helps to process the EPWs. (This is Aaron "Sto" Stojanoski, introduced in Section 1 as "Aaron" and who will reappear in Sections 4 and 5) When Wilson asks what will happen to the prisoners, Burrnett responds: "What the fuck do you care?" Wilson admits to himself: "He was right. What the fuck did I care?"

Wilson becomes habituated to humiliating the hadjis laborers he supervises. His internal narrative maintains that he was once "sensitive" and "a poet", but his external persona is a that of a strict disciplinarian, who longs for a catharsis: "Please Jesus…let me fucking kill somebody."

Wilson and his comrades sweep through residential buildings, "kicking in doors and screaming at hadjis." No weapons are discovered. His tour in Iraq nears its end.

Flashback: Wilson reflects on the events that led to his enlistment in the Army. Unemployed and low on cash, he seeks work at fast food restaurants. The horrors of the 9/11 tragedy are topics among his friends at social gatherings. Wilson goes to an Army recruiter and enlists.

=== The Fall (Baghdad, 2003): "C" narrative, Section 3 ===
The Fall opens in Saddam Hussien's Iraq just before the US invasion and occupation in 2003. Baghdad residents are preparing for the imminent bombing campaign by American coalition forces. The educated classes of Iraq are torn between those citizens who wish to retain the Sunni Islam leadership under Saddam Hussein, and those who wish to replace it and establish as democratic-republic similar to the United States. The military that is tasked with resisting US forces is itself divided: "The Sunni officers despised the almost wholly Shi'a ranks, and vice versa, and everything was infiltrated by Mukhabarat."

Baghdad mathematics instructor, Qusim al-Zabadi, from a well-to-do family, is pressured to collaborate with the US invaders by his advisor Professor Huresi. Qusim's Islamic fundamentalist cousin Adham (though a member of Huseins's Baathist Party), exhorts Qusim to assist in rejecting secular Iraq and reestablishing an Islamic Caliphate; Qusim is disgusted and returns to his hometown Baqubah and to visit his mother. She chastises him for leaving his family to pursue his doctorate degree, and for not providing her with grandchildren. His relationship with his wife, Lateefah, is strained.

Salman is a colleague of Qusim at the Baghdad university and a descendant of agrarian peasants; he is the only male survivor of murderous pogroms by Saddam's Republican Guards in the 1991 Shi'a Uprising. Salman observes Qusim flirting with student and beauty Anouf Hamadaya: her brother is a rich black marketeer who works for the murderous criminal Munir Muhanned. Qusim indulges in sexual fantasies about Anouf. Qusim's Uncle Luqman anticipates that Iraq will reap great benefits by the overthrow of Saddam Hussien. Qusim is severely bitten in the hand by a wild dog. Salman, a reservist and undercover agent, rendezvous with Aziz, a Mukhabarat operator and torturer. Salman enlists with the Mukhabarat to infiltrate US military forces as a translator. Aziz instructs Salman to collect information on a university employee who is suspected of working with Munir Muhanned to encode messages for American forces in Kuwait, namely, Qusim al-Zabadi.

Qusim stays in the Baghdad home of his paternal uncle Mohammed and his wife, aunt Thurayya; she despises Qasim for abandoning his family in Baqubah. The household abounds with cousins and their children, all of whom are Saddam loyalists and orthodox Sunnis, culturally Europeanized and well-educated. The family is stockpiling supplies of propane and fresh water. Qusim demonstrates his ignorance of firearms when Mohammed tries to teach him to operate a Kalashnikov. His uncle Mohammed, a building contractor and a nationalist, and his friend since childhood, Othman, a "poet and romantic" debate the virtues and merits of an Iraq under Saddam Hussein's paternalistic regime versus a democratic regime underAmerica's George W. Bush, underscoring the deep social and political split among educated Iraqis. Qusim insults his Aunt Thurayya; Mohammed gently chastens him, and advises him on his paternal responsibilities. When Qusim dismisses the admonishment, his uncle slaps him in the face, and threatens to turn him out of the house. Qusim's alienation from his immediate family and his relatives appears complete.

Qasim is visited at his uncle's home by two mysterious men. They are interrogators for the police state. Terrified mathematician is reprimanded for failing to join Saddam Hussein's Baathist Party. Based on his advanced knowledge of math, they accuse him of being a cryptologist: Qusim has been linked to the underworld criminal Munir Muhanned through his connection to Anouf Hamadya and her brother, a smuggler serving Munir. Qusim admits that Anouf had asked him to write codes, but that he had declined the offer. After smashing his finger with a hammer, they threaten to interrogate him at Abu Ghraib, then depart. Qusim attempts to return to his family in Baqubah, but the untreated dog bite has become gangrenous. He is taken to hospital after he collapses from the infection. During his convalescence he has disturbing hallucinations resembling phantasmagorias.

Mohammed and his family view the televised speech by US President George W. Bush, proclaiming the war on Iraq as liberation.

The B-52 bombings commence. Othman rejoices in the US invasion, viewing it as a force that will promote a free and flourishing Arab democracy. Baghdad's social infrastructure is obliterated as the bombings intensify. Bread prices soar, fuel and electricity are shut off. The women of the Mohammed clan turn to prayer for solace. US marines enter Baghdad and the streets are filled with tanks and humvees, the city reverberates with small arms fire and artillery shell explosives. The family ceases to venture from their home.

When Qusim finally recovers from his infection, he implores his uncle to allow him to return to his wife in Baqubah. They prepare to depart.

=== Your Leader Will Direct Your Fire (Operation Iraqi Freedom, 2004): "B" narrative, Section 4 ===
This section opens with Wilson returning from leave to Iraq after a brief sojourn in Oregon. Wilson is pleased to return to his unit: "They understood. They knew the shit world we lived in, knew it better than anyone I could talk to back in Oregon." Wilson has developed a taste for combat and welcomes it. He is scheduled to be discharged in 90 days. P. 241 "Ninety days. To Easy." Throughout this period, Wilson reads left-liberal publications, including Noam Chomsky's For Reasons of State. He watches episodes from American sitcoms.

The intensity of the fighting around Baghdad has diminished. Wilson recalls that a US soldier was killed by an IED, his body incinerated in the blast. Wilson's unit is assigned to search civilian vehicles for firearms and "bombs or some kind of Axis-of-Evil. al-Qaeda spy shit." Qasim al-Zabadi,"a nervous, stick-thin math professor with a Scottish accent" is serving as Wilson's interpreter. An Iraqi father and his daughters are pulled over in a van. When the man objects to letting his girls exit the vehicle, the soldiers consider retaliating by falsely accusing him of transporting an IED. After the fall of the Saddam Hussien regime, Qusim is fearful that warlords and fundamentalist Islamists will discover he is serving US forces, he believes they will kill his family. He acknowledges to Wilson that the American provides a degree of stability to Iraq, but is ambivalent regarding the fall of the Sunni regime.

Wilson and his unit provide security at AO. Hadji workers enter the compound to begin their labor shifts. Sergeant Reynolds gives Wilson a stern warning to remain vigilant and prepare for a terrorist attack. Every Iraqi, even those working for US forces, is treated as a potential enemy combatant. Wilson works six-hour split shifts day and night. Wilson is alerted by an Iraqi informant of an imminent bomb threat, but discovers no system exists to convey the intelligence to military authorities. The informants are summarily dismissed.

A mentally disabled boy is shot in the chest by an American soldier after throwing rocks at US troops. The shooter is awarded a Bronze Star for valor.

Wilson is seven days away from his discharge. Reports arrive that four American contractors have been killed in Fallujah and their bodies hung from a bridge. Protests and riots erupt in Sadr City, Baghdad and in several Iraqi cities. Moqtada al-Sadr has called for a general uprising. A convoy in Wilson's unit ambushed with RPGs but without casualties. The Mahdi Army has been mobilized and the men are ordered to engage them as enemy combatants. Hours before Wilson's scheduled flight to Germany, his unit's tour of duty was extended 90 days.

Flashback: Wilson is living in a trailer near the Oregon coast in semi-solitude. Wildlife abounds in the evergreen forest. His mind "a fugue of half-thoughts" he attempts to convey his experiences in poetry, without success. Working part-time, Wilson tries to "figure shit out" by distracting himself with casual sex and recreational drugs. In the midst of this idyl, the first reports of the destruction of the Twin Towers reaches him.

Wilson is deployed to the front lines of the fighting. Casualties mount. In these combat zones, Wilson views images coming out of detention centers of Iraqis being tortured and humiliated by National Guard Military Police. Wilson's response is "Fuck 'em…They're shooting at us every day and I'm supposed to give a flying fuck about human rights?" Wilson dissociates from his former life in Oregon.

Wilson and his team arrive at a location identified as an insurgent hideout. They storm the residence, smash the occupants with rifle butts and ransack the house as children look on. Staff Sergeant Gooley orders his men to "Circle up!...Wrong house. Bad intel. Mount up. We're outta here."

=== Strange Hells (Columbus Day, 2004): "A" narrative, Section 5 ===
Matt attempts to rationalize Mel's diatribe, and counsels Aaron to offer her an apology. Bitter, Aaron dismisses the request. He finds Matt's naivete contemptible. The topic shifts to career aspirations and girls. At Dahlia's urging, Aaron agrees to a rapprochement with Mel, but to Matt's consternation, the veteran casually addresses Dahlia with a sexual reference: she reacts with a hostile retort and walks away. Matt recognizes his own abject physical and moral cowardice in the face of Aaron.

Aaron returns to the backyard and approaches the four women gathered around a fire. His mock apology to Mel is accepted, but Dahlia warns Aaron "you and me ain't cool." Aaron begins to manipulate the intoxicated and drugged Matt. He offers to show Matt some photos from Iraq, and the host takes Aaron to his computer den. While Matt is showing off his high-tech equipment, Wendy reveals to the women that Aaron is suffering from an undiagnosed but troubling form of war-related stress. His isolation is compounded by his estrangement from his family.

Aaron proceeds to exhibit his thumb drive of photos taken at a detention center in Baghdad. An Iraqi girl "Connie", arrested for petty theft, models nude for prison guards and performs other sexual favors for cash. Matt's voyeurism compels him to continue viewing the images. Aaron shows him an Iraqi man with his face brutally beaten, with a prison guard posed with a boot on his neck. The prisoner has a chem-light inserted into his rectum. Appalled, Matt asks "Are these torture pictures?" Aaron replies "I worked in detention…I took pictures…" adding "Nobody's making you look…" Aaron warms to his task, showing Matt a series of "enhanced interrogation" sessions. Aaron refers to these PUCs - "persons under control" - with brutal cynicism.

Aaron's photo collection includes images of Qasim, the math professor. He had been picked up by US authorities and accused of using his position as translator to provide intelligence to al-Qaeda. Qusim is pictured naked, bruised and bloody from beatings, hanging from a door. Aaron remarks: "We fucked that puck up…It's a weird thrill having that much physical control over somebody, knowing what you're doing."

Sunrise approaches. The woman, now "drunken revelers" cavort in the backyard. When Dahlia enters Matt's den, Aaron cheerfully invites her to see the "war porn." Matt, quickly removes the thumb drive, and ushers her outdoors. Matt grasps the criminality of Aaron's activities in Iraq and the danger he poses to himself and Dahlia. When Matt expresses doubt as to Aaron's sincerity regarding his difficulty adjusting to civilian life. Labeling Aaron a "Rambo fucking Hitler," Matt stalks off.

Aaron and Dahlia retire to the bedroom and she encourages him to tie her up before having sex. Aaron ignores her offer of a condom and binds her with a phone cord. Rather than engage in coitus, Aaron prepares to perform anal intercourse. Dahlia panics and begs to be untied. She struggles and Aaron slaps and gags her while placing her in a stress position. After sodomizing her, he calmly departs on his motorcycle.

== Reception and analysis ==
Literary critic Hilary Plum, writing in The Fanzine, comments on the merits of Scranton's literary style in War Porn:

The writing [in the Wilson narrative "B"] is bitingly vivid, moves so fluently through the speeds of boredom, violence, uncertainty, machismo—yet, too, there is a glimmer of metafictional awareness...in Qasim's section [narrative "C"], [the] style shifts, becomes lusher and more capacious in perspective; in the rhythms of the syntax and narration there is to my ear a gentle echo of great works of contemporary Arabic fiction as they arrive in English translation…to write from a perspective distant in language, ethnicity, culture from one's own, a perspective indeed from the other side of a war. This too is an act that most American writers avoid.

Journalist Sarah Hoenicke in the Los Angeles Review of Books writes:

War Porn is not a comfortable book. Scranton's experimental and interesting prose is meant to disturb the entrenched thought patterns of his readers. He defies the American cultural tenet that our military is lawful, moral, and organized, depicting it instead as it more probably is: needlessly brutal, a blunt instrument rather than a refined machine.

Hoenicke adds: "We experience three distinct narrators throughout, three different prose styles, and unannounced time changes, the text oscillating frequently between present and past…War Porn isn't easy to comprehend...We are meant to be overwhelmed."

Literary critic Eric London, writing in the World Socialist Web Site, calls War Porn "the most memorable and aesthetically rich anti-war novel to have emerged in response to the 'war on terror'" London adds "Though the title strikes the reader as an attempt at shock value, the inside jacket explains that 'war porn' means 'videos, images, and narratives featuring graphic violence, often brought back from combat zones, viewed voyeuristically or for emotional gratification. Such media are often presented and circulated without context, though they may be used as evidence of war crimes.'"

Journalist Peter Molin, writing in Acolytes of War observes that "the storylines, scenes, and episodes in War Porn are carefully integrated, while also serving the purpose of providing a kaleidoscopic view of war experience without privileging the perspective of any one participant, particularly that of a twenty-year-old American male combatant."

Arabic studies professor Elliot Colla writing in The Intercept reports that "War Porn contains some of the most significant and original writing on deployment to be found in contemporary American literature about the Iraq War." Colla also wrote:

As an example of war lit, War Porn is more Hemingway than Heller, more O'Brien than Vonnegut, meaning it belongs to an existentialist, rather than absurdist tradition of American war fiction...War Porn also argues vehemently against the age-old American investment in the idea that violence can redeem, and finally arrives at the conclusion that war offers no lessons or truths, not even the existentialist ones so favored by other soldier authors.

Colla adds this caveat:

Scranton's War Porn, however, diverges sharply from other recent works of fiction about Iraq in such fundamental ways that it is difficult to imagine mainstream critics giving it the same hearty 'thank-you-for-your-service' reception that they normally extend to any title produced by a veteran…Further upsetting the typical narrative...is the fact that the story is told out of order. The effect—like so much contemporary fiction on the war—is to plumb the disorientation that occurs in cycles of deployment and return…

== Sources ==
- Colla, Elliot. 2016. A Veteran Novel That Finds No Redemption in War. The Intercept, August 7, 2016. https://theintercept.com/2016/08/07/a-veteran-novel-that-finds-no-redemption-in-war/ Retrieved 27 November 2021.
- Hefti, Matthew J. 2016. The Supply and Demand of War. Electric Literature.com 1 September 2016. https://electricliterature.com/the-supply-and-demand-of-war/ Retrieved 1 June 2022.
- Hoenicke, Sarah. 2016. When the Hurlyburly's Done: Roy Scranton's "War Porn" Los Angeles Review of Books. August 16, 2016. https://theintercept.com/2016/08/07/a-veteran-novel-that-finds-no-redemption-in-war/ Retrieved 27 May 2022.
- London, Eric. 2016. (2) An Interview with Roy Scranton, author of War Porn. World Socialist Web Site. 1 September 2016. https://www.wsws.org/en/articles/2016/09/01/scra-s01.html Retrieved 20 November 2021.
- London, Eric. 2016 (1) The anti-war novel re-emerges in American literature. World Socialist Web Site. 22 August 2016. https://www.wsws.org/en/articles/2016/08/22/warp-a22.html Retrieved 8 June 2022.
- Molin, Peter. 2016. Right on Time, Five Years Later: Roy Scranton's War Porn. Acolytesofwar.com August 3, 2016. https://acolytesofwar.com/2016/08/03/right-on-time-five-years-later-roy-scrantons-war-porn/ Retrieved 20 October 2021.
- Plum, Hilary. 2016. War Porn: An Interview with Roy Scranton. The Fanzine, thefanzine.com, September 26, 2016. http://thefanzine.com/war-porn-an-interview-with-roy-scranton/ Retrieved 2 June 2022.
- Scranton, Roy. 2016. War Porn. Soho Press. 2016. ISBN 9781616957155
