= Kaneza Schaal =

American actress and stage director

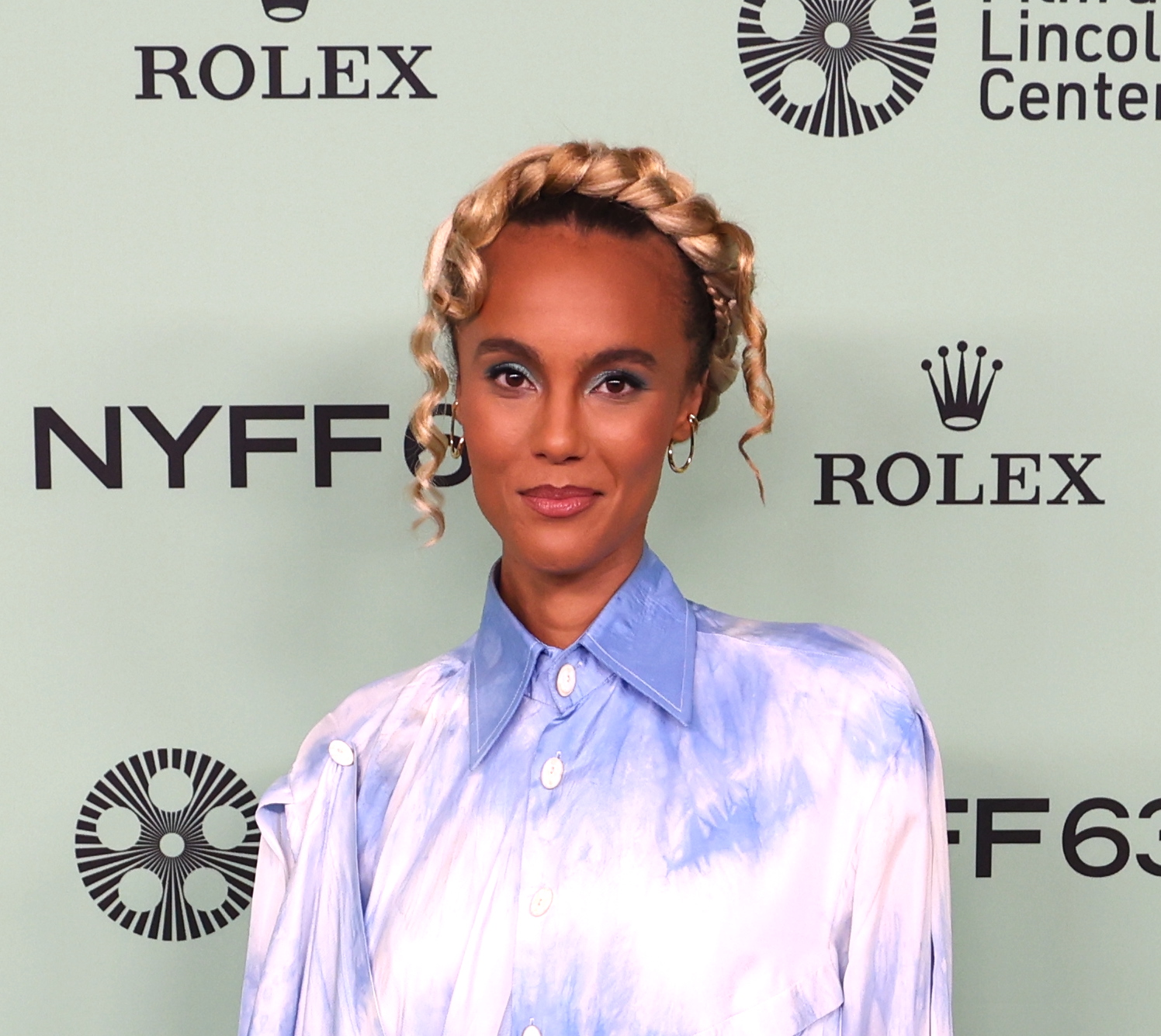
- Schaal in 2025
- Education: Wesleyan University (BA)
- Style: Experimental theater
- Children: 1
- Awards: Guggenheim Fellowship (2021)

Kaneza Schaal is an American actress and stage director who works in experimental theater. She is a 2021 Guggenheim Fellow.

== Biography ==
Schaal was born to a Rwandan father. Her grandfather Murara was a Tutsi Rwandan who fled to Burundi with his wife and children and ran a guest house there. She was raised at her aunt's home in San Francisco, where several gay men her aunt knew died of AIDS during her youth. She obtained a BA in Psychology and Theater from Wesleyan University in 2006.

Schaal's first work was with Elevator Repair Service and The Wooster Group. She was awarded a 2008 Princess Grace Award. She was the first artist-in-residence of Performance Space 122's RAMP program.

Schaal's play Go Forth, inspired by her experiences with visiting her father's funeral in Burundi, premiered as part of P.S. 122's COIL Festival in January 7, 2016. She directed the three-part Jack &, which played in October 2018 and April 2019. In 2019, she and Reggie Gray co-directed Maze, a street dance performance at The Shed, and later that year, she directed Triptych (Eyes of One on Another), a tribute to photographer Robert Mapplethorpe. She also received a 2019 United States Artists Fellowship in Theater & Performance In 2020, she directed Cartography, which Schaal called an attempt to "centralize the hero's journey in everyone's story" amidst anti-immigration sentiment.

Schaal was awarded a 2021 Guggenheim Fellowship and a 2021 Alpert Award in the Arts. She directed Omar, a biographical opera about Omar ibn Said; it premiered at the Spoleto Festival USA on May 27, 2022 and won the 2023 Pulitzer Prize for Music. That same year, she starred as King Leopold in KILL, a one-act play she and Myers co-directed; mixing dance, music, and anti-imperialist texts, Amber Power of Bomb called it a "bricolage of source materials and media [which] can be seen as a formal nod to the experimental theatre tradition in which Schaal is steeped". She was part of the 2024-2025 Metropolitan Museum of Art exhibition Flight Into Egypt: Black Artists and Ancient Egypt, 1876 -- Now, with her performance art piece "Go Forth" taking inspiration from the Book of the Dead. She starred in the 2025 documentary film BLKNWS: Terms & Conditions. She was awarded a 2025 Doris Duke Artist Award.

Schaal has taught at Harvard College Theater, Dance & Media.

Originally based in Freestone, California, Schaal is based in New York City. She has a daughter.
