= Peter Brock (historian) =

Canadian historian of pacifism (1920–2006)

Peter Brock (1920–2006) was an English-born Canadian historian who specialized in the history of pacifism and Eastern Europe.

== Life ==
Peter Brock was born in 1920 on Guernsey, Channel Islands. Although he came from a military family, he rejected this tradition. While studying at Exeter College, Oxford, he came under the influence of pacifist ideas, particularly those of Bart de Ligt.

During the Second World War, he declared as a conscientious objector and was briefly imprisoned. He spent the rest of the war on alternative service, including working in a hospital.

After the war, Brock worked with a Quaker relief mission to Germany and Poland, sparking his interest in Eastern Europe. After the mission ended, Brock took graduate study at Jagiellonian University, receiving a doctorate in history in 1950.

But, unlike many of us, Peter was not content to specialize in the history of just one country. He received a second doctoral degree in history from Oxford University in 1954 with a study that resulted in the publication of The Political and Social Doctrines of the Unity of Czech Brethren in the Fifteenth and Early Sixteenth Centuries (1957), which married his interest in pacifism to his interest in east central Europe, something he would continue with studies of examples of pacifism in the region. From Czech history he went on to studies in the history of Lusatian Sorbs, Kashubs, Ukrainians, Slovaks, and Hungarians, some of which were collected in Folk Cultures and Little Peoples: Aspects of National Awakening in East Central Europe (1992) and The Slovak National Awakening: An Essay in the Intellectual History of East Central Europe (1976). As a dedicated historian, Peter did not let the necessity of learning another language deter him from using primary sources on a topic that interested him. When I once expressed admiration for his ability to learn Hungarian, he replied with characteristic self-deprecation but without a touch of irony that he could only read Hungarian, not speak it.

Brock later emigrated to Canada and settled there, working at the University of Toronto from 1966.

Brock's work on the study of peoples in Eastern Europe included detailed studies of the history and culture of the culture of the Poles, Czechs, and Ukrainians. Brock often learned the languages of the culture he was studying in order to read source material in these languages.

Brock's studies on pacifism included a trilogy of books, Pacifism in the United States: From the Colonial Era to the First World War (1968), Pioneers of the Peaceable Kingdom (1970), and Twentieth-Century Pacifism (1970). The last book, appearing as the Vietnam War protests had revived public interest in pacifism, was "a critical and popular success". By 1973, historian Robert Scharf said that "Professor Brock has become a recognised authority on pacifism in our Western civilization", while political scientist Martin Ceadel stated "[n]o ideology owes more to one academic than pacifism owes to Peter Brock. That the scope and richness of this historical tradition can now be recognized is largely the result of Brock's sympathetic and dedicated scholarship, which was begun when pacifism was an unfashionable subject."

A revised edition of the third book, Pacifism in the Twentieth Century was published in 1999 with Nigel Young.

== See also ==
- List of peace activists

== Bibliography ==
For a complete bibliography, see "Bibliography of Scholarly Writings by Peter de Beauvoir Brock". Canadian Slavonic Papers. 31 (2): 211–220. 1989. doi:10.1080/00085006.1989.11091915. JSTOR 40869051.

- The Political and Social Doctrines of the Unity of Czech Brethren in the fifteenth and early sixteenth centuries (1957).
- Vasya Pozdnyakov's Dukhobor narrative (1965).
- Pacifism in the United States. From the colonial era to the First World War. (1968).
- Radical Pacifists in antebellum America (1968).
- The Czech renascence of the nineteenth century: Essays presented to Otakar Odložilík in honour of his seventieth birthday(edited by Brock and H. Gordon Skilling) (1970).
- Pioneers of the Peaceable Kingdom (1970).
- Twentieth-century pacifism (1970).
- Pacifism in Europe to 1914 (1972).
- Nationalism and populism in partitioned Poland: Selected essays (1973).
- The Slovak National Awakening (1976).
- Polish Revolutionary Populism (1977).
- Fighting Joe Martin : founder of the Liberal Party in the West : a blow-by-blow account (1981).
- The roots of war resistance : pacifism from the early church to Tolstoy (1981).
- The Mahatma and mother India : essays on Gandhiʾs non-violence and nationalism (1983).
- The military question in the early church : a selected bibliography of a century’s scholarship 1888-1987 (1988).
- The Quaker peace testimony 1660 to 1914 (1990).
- Freedom from war : nonsectarian pacifism, 1814-1914 (1991).
- Studies in Peace History (1991).
- Folk Cultures and Little Peoples : Aspects of National Awakening in East Central Europe (1992).
- Freedom from violence : sectarian nonresistance from the Middle Ages to the Great War (1992).
- A brief history of pacifism from Jesus to Tolstoy (1992).
- Records of conscience : three autobiographical narratives by conscientious objectors 1665-1865 (1993).
- Pacifism to 1914 : an overview (1994).
- Bart de Ligt (1885-1938) : overdenkingen bij het herlezen van "La paix créatrice” na 51 jaar = Reflections on rereading "La paix créatrice” after fifty-one years. (1994).
- Mahatma Gandhi as a linguistic nationalist (1995).
- Testimonies of conscience sent from the Soviet Union to the War Resisters International, 1923-1929 (editor) (1997).
- Varieties of pacifism : a survey from antiquity to the outset of the twentieth century (1998).
- Challenge to Mars : essays on pacifism from 1918 to 1945 (with Thomas P. Socknat (1999).
- Pacifism in the Twentieth century (with Nigel Young) (1999).
- The riddle of St. Maximilian of Tebessa (2000).
- Pacifism since 1914 : an annotated reading list (2000).
- Life in a penal battalion of the Imperial Russian Army : the Tolstoyan N.T. Iziumchenko’s story (edited by Peter Brock and John L.H. Keep; translated by Keep) (2001).
- From Wandsworth to Wormwood Scrubs : one man's view of prison. (2000). Published in Britain as
- The Black Flower : One Man’s memory of prison sixty years after (2001).
- Life in an Austro-Hungarian military prison : the Slovak Tolstoyan Dr. Albert Škarvan’s story translated from the Slovak and edited by Brock (2002).
- Liberty and conscience : a documentary history of the experiences of conscientious objectors in America through the Civil War (2002).
- "These strange criminals" : an anthology of prison memoirs by conscientious objectors from the Great War to the Cold War (2004).
- Against the draft : essays on conscientious objection from the Radical Reformation to the Second World War (2006).
- Nation and history : Polish historians from the Enlightenment to the Second World War. edited by Brock, John D. Stanley and Piotr J. Wróbel (2006).
