= Guy A. Sims =

African American comic book author

Guy A. Sims is an American author known for the Brotherman series of comic books and the first Chief Diversity and Inclusion Officer at The Free Library of Philadelphia. He is a frequent collaborator with his brother, the illustrator Dawud Anyabwile. In 2015, he adapted Walter Dean Myers' book Monster into a graphic novel which Anyabwile illustrated.

In 2017 the brothers worked together with Emory University to create the Big City Map Project which created a virtual reality (VR) world for the text of the Brotherman series. The Brotherman Comics and related memorabilia are archived at the National Museum of African American History & Culture.

== Personal life ==
Sims was born in Philadelphia to Edward Sims Jr., a sociology professor and Deanna Jones-Sims, a public school teacher. Dr. Sims and Mrs. Jones-Sims were originally from Jersey City, New Jersey. Guy is the second oldest out of the four boys they raised in Mount Airy, Philadelphia.

Guy's neighbors included Matt Robinson and Holly Robinson.

He lives in Blacksburg, Virginia, with his wife and three kids.
