= Crystal (novel) =

Novel by Walter Dean Myers

- First edition
- Author: Walter Dean Myers
- Language: English
- Subject: Modeling
- Genre: Realistic Fiction
- Publisher: Viking Juvenile
- Publication date: 1987
- Publication place: United States
- Pages: 208
- ISBN: 978-0-06-447312-5

Crystal is a young adult novel by Walter Dean Myers. It was first published in 1987 and later republished by Amistad in 2002. The book focuses on Crystal Brown, a 16-year-old African American girl who is destined for stardom when she lands a contract with a modeling agency.

== Summary ==
Crystal Brown has always been told that she is beautiful. She lives with her mother, Mrs. Brown, who is also beautiful, and her loving, but strict father. They live in the borough of Brooklyn in New York City. Crystal is at first elated when she lands a modeling contract with a fashion agency, because she likes to model and can possibly be famous. As the novel continues, Crystal realizes that the modeling business is not all it is cut out to be. Her friendship with her best friend, Pat, is suffering, her grades are slipping, and on top of all of that, Crystal feels her self-respect is at risk. She especially feels this way when her photographer, Jerry Goodwin, wants her to pose nude. Crystal starts to feel that the modeling business is just all about how she looks and not who she is. Soon, Crystal realizes she wants to quit. Her agent, Loretta, however, insists Crystal star in a movie that will ultimately boost her fame. Crystal refuses. Soon after, a fellow model named Rowena commits suicide. This finally makes Crystal quit the modeling industry. The novel ends with a man coming up to Crystal and giving her his card. He says: "...Edward Abruzzi, Photographer...I think you could get into modeling...”

== Awards ==
National Book Award Finalist
