= Monster (Myers novel) =

1999 novel by Walter Dean Myers

- First edition
- Author: Walter Dean Myers
- Cover artist: Christopher Myers
- Language: English
- Genre: Drama, Crime novel, Mystery
- Publisher: HarperCollins
- Publication date: 1999
- Publication place: United States
- Media type: Print (paperback)
- Pages: 281 pp
- ISBN: 0-06-440731-4
- OCLC: 40043530
- LC Class: PZ7.M992 Mon 2004

Monster, published April 21, 1999 by HarperCollins, is a young adult drama novel by American author Walter Dean Myers. It was nominated for the 1999 National Book Award for Young People's Literature, won the Michael L. Printz Award in 2000, and was named a Coretta Scott King Award Honor the same year.

The book uses a mixture of a third-person screenplay and a first-person diary format to tell the story, through the perspective of Steve Harmon, an African American teenager.

== Plot ==
The novel begins with 16-year-old Steve Harmon writing in his book awaiting his trial for murder. Musing on his short time in prison so far, he decides to record this upcoming experience in the form of a movie screenplay. Kathy O'Brien, Steve's lawyer, informs him on what will happen during the trial. At this stage, only two of the four accused—James King and Steve—will be tried, since the other two accused—Richard "Bobo" Evans and Osvaldo Cruz—have entered into a plea bargain. When the trial first begins, Steve flashes back to a movie he saw in his school's film of predictability.

The trial begins with the opening statements of the prosecutor Sandra Petrocelli, Miss O'Brien, and King's lawyer, Asa Briggs. Petrocelli labels the four accused men, including Steve, as "monsters." The lawyers call on several witnesses, including Salvatore Zinzi and Wendell Bolden, illicit cigarette traders, who admit to buying cigarettes that came from a drugstore robbery that led to the murder. The story of the trial is often broken up by a variety of flashbacks, including ones showing that King is only acquainted with Steve, and that King had accused Steve of pulling the trigger during the robbery. Petrocelli calls as a witness Osvaldo Cruz, who is affiliated with the Diablos, a violent street gang. Cruz admits to participating in the crime only due to coercion by "Bobo."

Steve recounts a visit from his father, who wishes Steve would have gone on to attend his alma mater, Morehouse College. After recounting various news reports covering the robbery and murder, Steve documents his arrest and his mother's panicked reaction. Before returning to the trial, Steve writes in his notes that he cannot psychologically handle writing down the tragic details of the robbery itself. The coroner, the city clerk, and a detective are questioned in a four-way split screen montage. Miss O'Brien warns Steve not to write down in his notebook anything that he does not want the prosecutor to see.

According to Cruz, the original plan was that Steve would go into the drugstore and signal if the coast was clear. and Bobo robbed the store owner, Mr. Nesbitt, Cruz would slow down any potential pursuers. Bobo takes the witness stand to say that James King pulled the trigger and vaguely recalls that Steve, whom he hardly knows, was meant to give an all-clear signal.

Briggs argues that neither King nor Steve was ever involved in the crime since the only eyewitness to the robbery saw only two men involved, which can be accounted for by Bobo and Cruz alone. Though Miss O'Brien seems doubtful of Steve's innocence, she wisely has him distance himself from King. Steve appears to know King and Cruz only as remote acquaintances, and Bobo hardly at all. Steve testifies that he does not particularly remember where he was on the day of the robbery, but that he certainly was not a participant. The defense systematically casts the honesty of Petrocelli's witnesses in doubt. Although many of the testimonies contradict, even the most incriminating toward Steve claims only that he acted as a lookout in the first stage of the robbery.

George Sawicki, Steve's film club mentor, serves as a character witness, proudly defending Steve's moral character. Briggs, Miss O'Brien, and Petrocelli finally make their closing statements, before the jury decides on a verdict. James King is found guilty, while Steve is found not guilty. As Steve moves to hug O'Brien, she chills up and turns away, leaving Steve to question why. The end of the novel takes place five months after Steve has been cleared of all charges and released from prison. Steve has continued his film-making, but his father has moved away, creating a noticeable distance between the two. He is still confused as to Miss O'Brien's demeanor at the end of the trial, wondering what she saw in him that made her turn away.

== Themes and format ==
The novel depicts the themes of identity, race, peer pressure, dehumanization, crime, teenaged masculinity, and the relative or subjective nature of the truth. This idea comes up multiple times throughout the novel. There is the truth in relation to the law, but also the truth of a person's character. Steve, during the trial, writes about experiences he has had that directly contradict the thug persona he has been labeled with. The book reads like a formal screenplay, written by Steve Harmon, interspersed with seemingly handwritten fragments from his diary. The screenplay's verisimilitude is enhanced by such cues as "fade in," "voice over," and “fade out." As one critic wrote, the novel is "Presented alternately as the first‑person, handwritten memoir... [and] a neatly typed screenplay." Critics have commented on how the novel offers "surface effects—marginalia, drawing, photographs, mugshots, and video stills—to offer an analysis of the complex identities that emerge in the context of such surfaces." Generally, the novel has been praised for remarkably sophisticated levels of thematic and formal complexity, considering its ostensible status as a young adult novel. As another critic wrote, "Monster is an experiment in form and structure," demonstrating Steve's "vent[ing of] his passionate perplexity."

The novel is interspersed with various photos depicting Steve. Many appear to be placed around the prison, possibly taken after he has been released as he is dressed in plain clothes. However, his oversized T-shirt is striped, possibly indicating that he will never be free from this experience. Myers had an affinity for addressing issues of race in many of his other novels as well as in several articles he penned.

== Autobiographical elements ==
As a young man, Myers struggled with a speech impairment that caused many of his classmates and teachers to ridicule him and think him unintelligent. He often got into trouble at school for selling drugs in school and on the streets. When trying to defend himself against the ridicule, many labeled him a “monster" much like how Steve Harmon was labeled a monster. Later, while working as a construction worker, Myers decided to follow advice given to him by his high school writing teacher and began writing at night after work, just as the character Steve Harmon writes throughout the novel.

The cover artist for the novel is Myers' son, Christopher Myers.

== Reception ==
Monster received the following accolades:

- 1999, National Book Award for Young People's Literature finalist
- 1999, Boston Globe-Horn Book Award nominee for Fiction
- 2000, American Library Association (ALA), Best Books for Young Adults
- 2000, Michael L. Printz Award
- 2000, Coretta Scott King Award for Authors nominee
- 2001, ALA Amazing Audiobooks for Young Adults
- 2001, Rhode Island Teen Book Award Nominee
- 2005, Lincoln Award nominee
- Edgar Award for Best Young Adult nominee

== Film adaptation ==
Monster has been adapted into a film of the same name directed by Anthony Mandler. It premiered at the 2018 Sundance Film Festival. It stars an ensemble cast that includes Kelvin Harrison Jr., Jeffrey Wright, Jennifer Hudson, Nas and A$AP Rocky. It was released by Netflix on May 7, 2021.
