= Frederick Douglass: The Lion Who Wrote History =

Book by Walter Dean Myers

- Authors: Walter Dean Myers
- Illustrator: Floyd Cooper
- Language: English
- Subject: Children's literature, Biography, United States history, Children's picture book
- Published: 2017 (Harper)
- Publication place: United States
- Media type: Print (hardback, paperback)
- Pages: 32 (unpaginated)
- ISBN: 978-0-06-027709-3
- OCLC: 894491593

Frederick Douglass: The Lion Who Wrote History is a 2017 picture book biography by Walter Dean Myers about the life of Frederick Douglass.

== Reception ==
Booklist, in a starred review, wrote "Focused, informative writing and strong, effective illustrations combine to make this the go-to Frederick Douglass biography for younger students." and the School Library Journal wrote "Although this title is similar in scope to Doreen Rappaport's Frederick's Journey, the two books complement each other. Recommended for collections looking to further explore Douglass's legacy."

The Buffalo News called it an "excellent illustrated biography".

Frederick Douglass: The Lion Who Wrote History has also been reviewed by Kirkus Reviews, Publishers Weekly, The New York Times, and Common Sense Media.
