= Scorpions (novel) =

1988 novel by Walter Dean Myers

- First edition
- Author: Walter Dean Myers
- Language: English
- Subject: Harlem life, gangs
- Genre: Realistic fiction
- Publisher: Harper & Row
- Publication date: 1988
- Publication place: United States
- Pages: 216 pages
- ISBN: 978-0-06-447066-7

Scorpions, first published on June 20, 1988, by Harper & Row, is a young adult novel written by Walter Dean Myers. It was a Newbery Medal Honor Book in 1989.

The book was republished by HarperCollins on October 6, 2009 and by Amistad on April 23, 2013.

== Plot ==
Jamal is trying to get his brother, Randy, out of jail. Randy is a 17-year-old who is the leader of the Scorpions, a local gang of drug dealers in New York City.

Jamal's family includes himself, Randy, his mother, his 8-year-old sister whose name is Sassy, and his father, Jeovon Hicks. Jamal's father became an alcoholic after losing his job and began abusing Jamal's mother. She moves away with the children. Now Jamal's father comes to visit the family "once in a while".

When the story begins Jamal only needs $500 to appeal his conviction. His mother is working to the bone in order to earn enough money to get the appeal for Randy. His mother soon finds out that his brother has been attacked and stabbed while in jail and is in medical care. Some members of the Scorpions want Jamal to join them until Randy is freed from jail so that there will be direct communication between the gang and Randy. Other members want to vote on a new leader because they feel Randy is dead to them and that letting a 12-year-old join a gang would not be beneficial. Jamal wants to earn money the right way by working but is scared to go against the Scorpions. Eventually, Jamal breaks free from the bad influence and does the right thing.

== Characters ==
- Jamal Hicks: The main character. His brother is in jail and was the leader of a gang called the Scorpions. He becomes the leader after his brother is convicted.
- Randy Hicks: Jamal's brother. He was the leader of the Scorpions until he got convicted of murdering someone.
- Sassy Hicks: Jamal's sister. She always tells Mama everything she sees Jamal doing wrong.
- Mama Hicks: Jamal's mother. She is suspicious of Jamal because she thinks he is in the Scorpions.
- Tito: Jamal's best friend. Always helping Jamal.
- Abuela: Tito's grandmother
- Dwayne: Jamal's main enemy. He is always starting problems with Jamal in school.
- Mack: A member of the Scorpions. He protects Jamal from any harm done to him by other Scorpions.
- Indian: Another member of the Scorpions. He jumps Jamal along with his warlord, Angel.
- Angel: Indian's warlord.

== Reception ==
Scorpions received the following accolades:

- American Library Association's (ALA) Notable Children's Books of 1988 (1998)
- ALA's Best Books for Young Adults (1998)
- Library of Congress's Children's Books (1988)
- ALA's Recommended Books for Reluctant Young Adult Readers (1989)
- Newbery Medal Nominee (1989)
- New York Public Library's Books for the Teen Age (1989)
- Judy Lopez Memorial Award for Children's Literature Nominee (1002)
- ALA's The USA Through Children's Books (1990)
- IRA's Young Adult Choices (1990)
- Dorothy Canfield Fisher Children's Book Award Nominee (1990)
- Margaret A. Edwards Award (1994)
