= Roy Scranton =

American poet

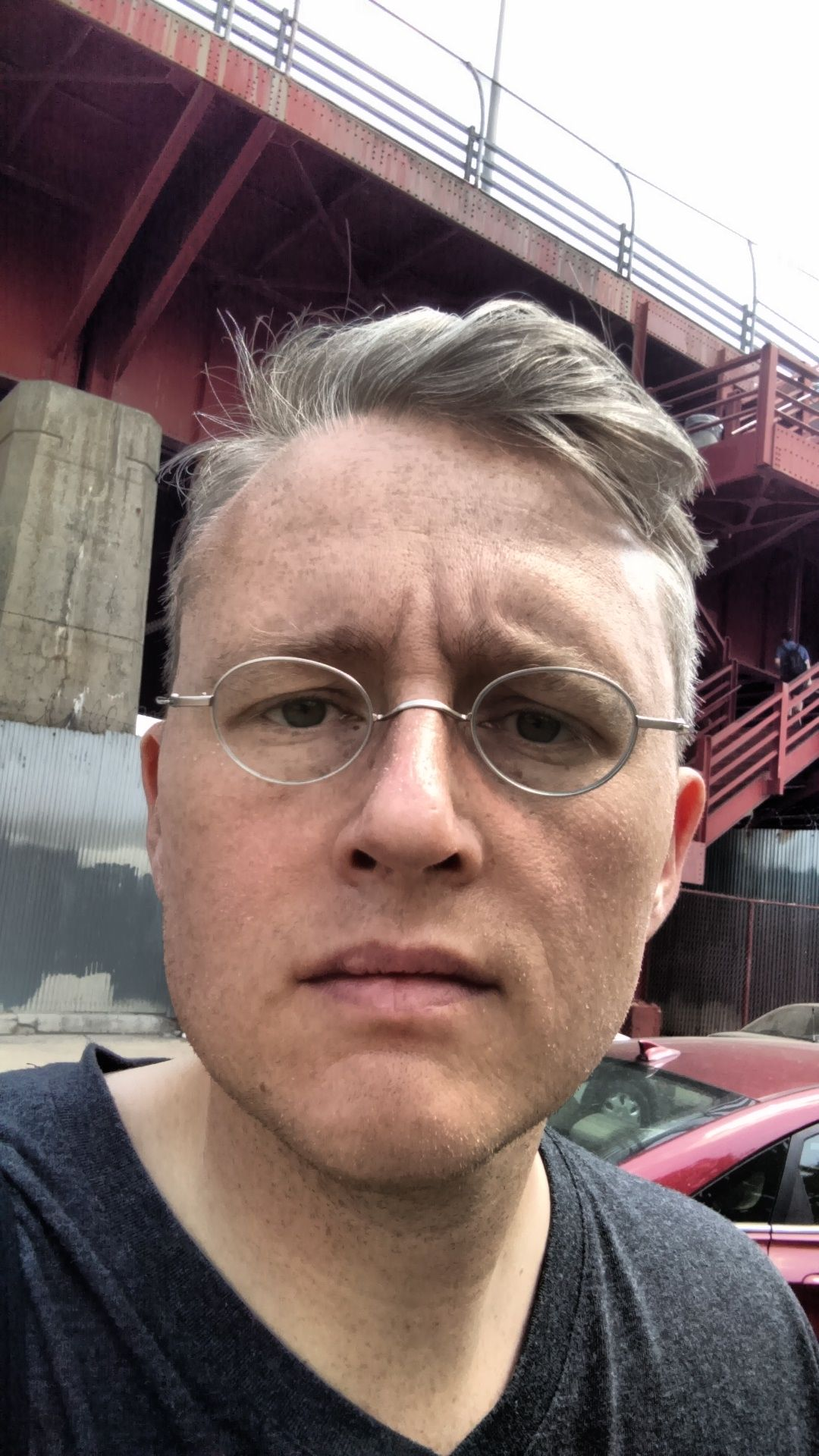
- Born: 1976 (age 49–50)
- Education: The New School (MA); Princeton University (PhD)
- Website: royscranton.com

Roy Scranton (born 1976) is an American writer of fiction, non-fiction, and poetry. His essays, journalism, short fiction, and reviews have appeared in The New York Times, Rolling Stone, The Nation, Dissent, LIT, Los Angeles Review of Books, and Boston Review. His first book, Learning to Die in the Anthropocene was published by City Lights. His novel War Porn was released by Soho Press in August 2016. It was called "One of the best and most disturbing war novels in years" by Sam Sacks in The Wall Street Journal. He co-edited Fire and Forget: Short Stories from the Long War. He currently teaches at the University of Notre Dame, where he is the director of the Environmental Humanities Initiative.

== Honors ==
Roy Scranton won the Theresa A. White Literary Award for short fiction 2009, received a Mrs. Giles G. Whiting Fellowship in the Humanities in 2014, and was awarded a Lannan Literary Fellowship in 2017. His New York Times essay “Learning How to Die in the Anthropocene” was selected for The Best American Science and Nature Writing 2014, and his essay “The Terror of the New” was selected as a notable essay in Best American Essays 2015. In 2021–2022, Roy Scranton was a fellow at the Notre Dame Institute for Advanced Studies. In 2024, Scranton was named a Guggenheim fellow.

== Reception ==
Author Jeff VanderMeer wrote of Learning to Die in the Anthropocene, "It’s a powerful, useful, and ultimately hopeful book that more than any other I've read has the ability to change people's minds and create change." Commenting on his bluntness, Rebecca Tuhus-Dubrow of the Los Angeles Review of Books wrote, "There is something cathartic about his refusal to shy away from the full scope of our predicament."

Historian Naomi Oreskes named Learning to Die in the Anthropocene one of the "five best books on the politics of climate change." She wrote, "I think he's fundamentally right about the essential point, which is that we have a tremendously difficult time assimilating just how serious this problem really is."

In the book How to Blow Up a Pipeline, author Andreas Malm criticized Scranton, stating that Scranton is united with other critics of climate activism by "a reification of despair" which Malm called "an eminently understandable emotional response to the crisis, but unserviceable as a response for a politics in it." He described Scranton's position as "climate fatalism", and stated that it is a self-fulfilling prophecy because "[the] more people who tell us that a radical reorientation is 'scarcely imaginable', the less imaginable it will be."

== Works ==
- Learning to Die in the Anthropocene: Reflections on the End of a Civilization. City Lights Publishers. 2016. ISBN 9780872866690
- War Porn. Soho Press. 2016. ISBN 9781616957155
- We're Doomed. Now What?: Essays on War and Climate Change. Soho Press. 2018. ISBN 978-1616959364
- I Heart Oklahoma!. Soho Press. 2019. ISBN 978-1616959388
- Total Mobilization: World War II and American Literature. University of Chicago Press. 2019. ISBN 978-0226637310
