= Walter Dean Myers =

American children's book author (1937–2014)

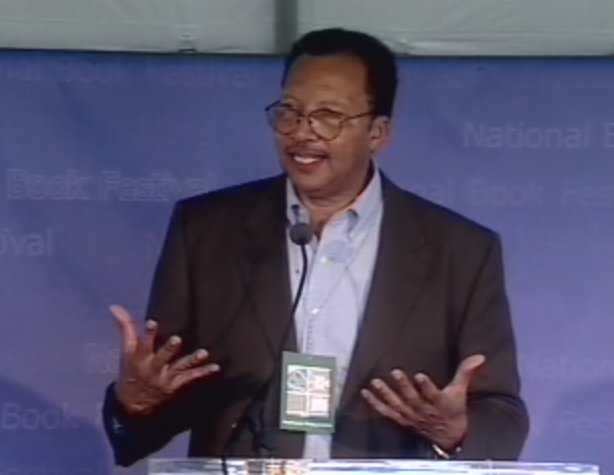
- Myers in 2001
- Born: Walter Milton Myers; August 12, 1937; Martinsburg, West Virginia, U.S.
- Died: July 1, 2014 (aged 76); New York City, U.S.
- Occupation: Writer
- Writing career
- Period: 1969–2014
- Genres: Young adult novels, nonfiction, poetry
- Notable works: Fallen Angels; Monster
- Notable awards: Margaret Edwards Award; 1994; Michael L. Printz Award; 2000; Children's Literature Legacy Award; 2019
- Website: walterdeanmyers.net

Walter Dean Myers (born Walter Milton Myers; August 12, 1937 – July 1, 2014) was an American writer best known for young adult literature. He was born in Martinsburg, West Virginia, and raised in Harlem, New York City. A difficult childhood inspired him to write, and his teachers encouraged writing as a way to express himself. Myers wrote more than one hundred books, including picture books and nonfiction. He won the Coretta Scott King Award for African-American authors five times. His 1988 novel Fallen Angels is one of the books most frequently challenged in the U.S. due to its adult language and its realistic portrayal of the Vietnam War.

Myers served as the third U.S. National Ambassador for Young People's Literature from 2012 to 2013. He also served on the Board of Advisors of the Society of Children's Book Writers and Illustrators (SCBWI).

== Biography ==
Walter Milton Myers was born in Martinsburg, West Virginia, United States, on August 12, 1937. At the age of three, Myers was given over to Florence Dean, the first wife of his biological father, George Myers, and her husband, Herbert. Florence and Herbert Dean raised him in Harlem, New York City. Herbert was an African-American man, and Florence was a German and Native American woman who taught English at the local high school. Myers later took "Dean" as his middle name in honor of his foster parents.

Myers's life as a child centered on the neighborhood and the church. The neighborhood protected him, and the church guided him. He was smart but did not do that well in school and was considered a disruptive student. As a child Myers was often teased for his speech impediment and lashed out at those who teased him. Seeing him struggle, a teacher urged him to use writing as a way to better express himself. During this time he cultivated the habit of writing poetry and short stories, and acquired an early love of reading.

Myers wrote well in high school, which his teacher Bonnie Liebow recognized. She also suspected that he would drop out and advised him to keep writing no matter what happened. He did not exactly understand what that meant, but years later, while working on a construction job in Chicago, he remembered her words. Myers would write at night, soon writing about his difficult teenage years. When asked what he valued most, he replied, "My books. They were my only real friends growing up." Myers attended Public School 125 on Lasalle Street and Stuyvesant High School, before dropping out to join the U.S. Army on his 17th birthday.

After leaving the army, Myers graduated from Empire State College with a bachelor of arts degree. He struggled with finding work and figuring out his purpose. This led him to remember the advice given by his high school teacher, and he began writing columns for men's magazines. It wasn't until Myers read the book Sonny's Blues by James Baldwin, which takes place in Harlem and focuses on African American characters, that he was inspired to start writing stories based on his personal experiences growing up.

Myers lived in Jersey City, New Jersey, with his family. His family includes his wife; son, author and illustrator Christopher Myers; son, Michael; six grandchildren; and two great-grandchildren. A daughter, Karen, predeceased him.

A prolific author, Myers wrote more than a hundred books for children and young adults during his 45-year writing career. Myers's writing focused on his difficult experiences as a teenager, and he worked to show troubled teens that reading is a necessity in life. For the years 2012 and 2013 Myers was the National Ambassador for Young People's Literature by appointment of the Library of Congress, a two-year position created to raise national awareness of the importance of lifelong literacy and education. During his time as the National Ambassador for Young People's Literature, Myers toured the United States advocating reading and used the slogan "Reading is Not Optional" to inspire teens to read.

On July 1, 2014, Myers died at Beth Israel Medical Center in Midtown Manhattan, after a brief illness. His last written work was an op-ed for The New York Times, "Where Are the People of Color in Children's Books?" in which he calls for a more complete representation of African Americans in children's literature. A We Need Diverse Books grant and award, the Walter Dean Myers Award, was named after him.

== Awards ==
Myers received the Margaret Edwards Award from the American Library Association in 1994 for his contribution in writing for teens. For his lifetime contribution as a children's writer, he was the U.S. nominee for the biennial, international Hans Christian Andersen Award in 2010. The ALA Margaret A. Edwards Award recognizes one writer and a particular body of work for "significant and lasting contribution to young adult literature". Myers won the annual award in 1994, for four books published from 1983 to 1988: Hoops (1983), Motown and Didi (1985), Fallen Angels (1988), and Scorpions (1988). The young-adult librarians observed that "these books authentically portray African-American youth, but their appeal is not limited to any particular ethnic group. The writing of Walter Dean Myers illustrates the universality of the teenage experience in urban America." He was a two-time runner-up for the annual Newbery Medal, recognizing the previous year's "most distinguished contribution to American literature for children", in 1989 for The Scorpion and in 1993 for Somewhere in the Darkness. The ALA split the Newbery several years later, establishing the Michael L. Printz Award for young adult literature. Myers was the inaugural winner for Monster (HarperCollins, 1999), which was thereby designated the year's "best book written for teens, based entirely on its literary merit".

Myers first published book was a contest winner: Where Does the Day Go?, written by Myers and illustrated by Leo Carty (Parents Magazine Press, 1969). It won a Council on Interracial Books for Children Award in 1968.

Myers was a finalist for the National Book Award for Young People's Literature in 1999 for Monster, in 2005 for Autobiography of My Dead Brother, and in 2010 for Lockdown. He is mentioned in Sharon Creech's 2001 poetic novella Love That Dog, in which a young boy admires Myers and invites him to visit his class.

In 2019, he won the Children's Literature Legacy Award.

== Works ==
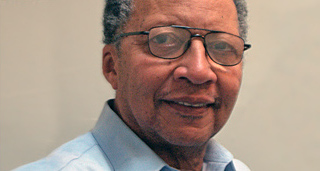
Myers in 2013

=== Complete bibliography in publication order ===
- The Life of a Harlem Man (Parents Magazine Press, 1968). Illustrated by Gene Riarti.
- Where Does a Day Go? (Parents Magazine Press, 1969). Ages 4–8. Illustrated by Leo Carty.
- The Dragon Takes a Wife (Bobbs-Merrill, 1972). Ages 4–8. Illustrated by Ann Grifalconi.
  - Republished, The Dragon Takes a Wife (Scholastic, 1995). Ages 4–8. Illustrated by Fiona French.
- The Dancers (Parents Magazine Press, 1972). Ages 5–8. Illustrated by Anne Rockwell.
- Fly, Jimmy, Fly! (Putnam, 1974). Ages 5–8. Illustrated by Moneta Barnett.
- The World of Work: A Guide to Choosing a Career (Bobbs-Merrill, 1975).
- Fast Sam, Cool Clyde, and Stuff (Viking Press, 1975). Ages 8–12.
- Social Welfare (Franklin Watts, 1976). Ages 12+.
- Brainstorm (Franklin Watts, 1977). Ages 12+. Illustrated with photographs by Chuck Freedman.
- Mojo and the Russians (Viking, 1977). Ages 10–14.
- Victory for Jamie (Scholastic Books, 1977). Ages 12+.
- It Ain't All for Nothin' (Viking, 1978). Ages 12+.
- The Young Landlords (Viking, 1979). Ages 8–12.
- The Black Pearl and the Ghost; or, One Mystery after Another (Viking, 1980). Ages 9–11. Illustrated by Robert Quackenbush.
- The Golden Serpent (Viking, 1980). Ages 6–9. Illustrated by Alice Provensen and Martin Provensen.
- Hoops (Delacorte Press, 1981). Ages 12+.
- The Legend of Tarik (Viking, 1981). Ages 12+.
- Won't Know Till I Get There (Viking, 1982). Ages 10–14.
- The Nicholas Factor (Viking, 1983). Ages 8–12.
- Tales of a Dead King (William Morrow and Company, 1983). Ages 8–12.
- Mr. Monkey and the Gotcha Bird (Delacorte, 1984). Ages 4–8. Illustrated by Leslie Morrill.
- Motown and Didi: A Love Story (Viking, 1984). Ages 12+.
- The Outside Shot (Delacorte, 1984). Ages 12+.
- Adventures in Granada (Viking 1985). Ages 8–12. Arrow Series.
- The Hidden Shrine (Viking, 1985). Ages 8–12. Arrow Series.
- Duel in the Desert (Viking, 1986). Ages 8–12. Arrow Series.
- Ambush in the Amazon (Viking, 1986). Ages 10–14. Arrow Series.
- Sweet Illusions (New York Teachers & Writers Collaborative, 1986). Ages 13+.
- Crystal (Viking, 1987). Ages 12+.
- Scorpions (Harper & Ross, 1988). Ages 8–12.
- Me, Mop, and the Moondance Kid (Delacorte, 1988). Ages 8–12.
- Fallen Angels (Scholastic, 1988). Ages 13+.
- The Mouse Rap (HarperCollins, 1990). Ages 12+.
- Now Is Your Time! The African-American Struggle for Freedom (HarperCollins, 1991).
- Somewhere in the Darkness (Scholastic, 1992). Ages 13+.
- Mop, Moondance, and the Nagasaki Knights (Delacorte, 1992). Ages 8–12.
- The Righteous Revenge of Artemis Bonner (HarperCollins, 1992). Ages 10–14.
- Malcolm X: By Any Means Necessary (Scholastic, 1993). Ages 12+.
- Young Martin's Promise (Raintree Steck-Vaughn, 1993). Ages 8–12.
- A Place Called Heartbreak: A story of Vietnam (Raintree Steck-Vaughn, 1993). Ages 8–12.
- Brown Angels: An Album of Pictures and Verse (HarperCollins, 1993). Ages 8–12.
- Sort of Sisters (Delacorte, 1993). Writing as Stacie Johnson.
- The Party (Delacorte, 1993). Writing as Stacie Johnson.
- The Prince (Delacorte, 1993). Writing as Stacie Johnson.
- "Things that go Gleep in the Night" in Don't Give Up the Ghost: The Delacorte Book of Original Ghost Stories edited by David Gale (Delacorte Books for Young Readers, 1993).
- The Glory Field (Scholastic, 1994). Ages 13+.
- Darnell Rock Reporting (Delacorte Press, 1994). Ages 8–12.
- The Story of the Three Kingdoms (HarperCollins, 1995). Ages 4–8. Illustrated by Ashley Bryan.
- Shadow of the Red Moon (1995) (Scholastic, 1995). Ages 8–12. Illustrated by son Christopher Myers.
- Glorious Angels: A Celebration of Children (HarperCollins, 1995). Ages 4–8.
- Turning Points: When Everything Changes (Troll Communications, 1996). Ages 4–6. With Mireille Eckstein and Judith Viorst. Part of the Troll Target Series.
- Sniffy Blue: Ace Crime Detective Case of the Missing Ruby and Other Stories (Scholastic, 1996). Ages 7–10. Illustrated by David J. Sims .
- One More River to Cross: An African American Photograph Album (Harcourt Brace, 1996). Ages 8–12.
- How Mr. Monkey Saw the Whole World (Doubleday, 1996). Ages 4–8. Illustrated by Synthia Saint James.
- Toussaint L'ouverture: The Fight for Haiti's Freedom (Simon & Schuster, 1996). Ages 8–12. Illustrated by Jacob Lawrence.
- "Reverend Abbott and those Bloodshot Eyes" in When I was Your Age: Original Stories About Growing Up edited by Amy Ehrlich (Candlewick Press 1996).
- Harlem (Scholastic, 1997). Ages 8–12. Illustrated by son Christopher Myers
- Amistad: A Long Road to Freedom (Dutton, 1997). Ages 8–12.
- "Stranger" in No Easy Answers edited by Donald R. Gallo (1997)
- "Sunrise Over Manaus" in From One Experience to Another: Award-Winning Authors Sharing Real-Life Experiences Through Fiction edited by M. Jerry Weiss and Helen S. Weiss (1997).
- Angel to Angel: A Mother's Gift of Love (HarperCollins, 1998). Ages 8–12.
- Slam! (Scholastic, 1998). Ages 12+.
- "The Escape" in Trapped! Cages of Body and Mind edited by Lois Duncan (1998).
- At Her Majesty's Request: An African Princess in Victorian England (Scholastic, 1999). Ages 8–12.
  - Also known as An African Princess: From African Orphan to Queen Victoria's Favorite
- The Journal of Joshua Loper: A Black Cowboy, the Chisholm Trail, 1871 (Scholastic, 1999). Ages 8–12. Part of the My Name is America series.
- Monster (HarperCollins, 1999). Ages 13+.
  - Republished Monster: A Graphic Novel (Amistad, 2015). Adapted by Guy Sims and illustrated by Dawud Anyabwile.
- "The Beast is in the Labyrinth" in Places I Never Meant to Be: Original Stories by Censored Writers (1999) edited by Judy Blume.
- We Were Heroes: The Journal of Scott Pendleton Collins, a World War II Soldier, Normandy, France, 1944 (Scholastic, 1999). Ages 10–14. Part of the My Name Is America series.
- Malcolm X: A Fire Burning Brightly (HarperCollins, 2000). Ages 8–12. Illustrated by Leonard Jenkins.
- The Blues of Flats Brown (Holiday House, 2000). Ages 4–8. Illustrated by Nina Laden.
- 145th Street: Short Stories (Delacorte, 2000). Ages 13+.
- The Greatest: The Life of Muhammad Ali (Scholastic, 2000). Ages 12+.
- Bad Boy: A Memoir (HarperCollins, 2001). Ages 12+.
- Down to the Last Out: The Journal of Biddy Owens: The Negro Leagues, 1948 (Scholastic, 2001). Ages 8–12. Part of the My Name is America series.
- Patrol: An American Soldier in Vietnam (HarperCollins, 2012). Ages 8–12. Illustrated by Ann Grafalconi.
- Three Swords for Granada (Holiday House, 2002). Ages 8–12. Illustrated by John Speirs.
- Handbook for Boys: A Novel (HarperCollins, 2002). Ages 10+. Illustrated by Matthew Bandsuch.
- "Block Party - 145th Street Style" in Big City Cool: Short Stories about Urban Youth edited by M. Jerry Weiss and Helen S. Weiss (2002)
- Somewhere in the Darkness (2003).
- A Time to Love: Stories from the Old Testament. (Scholastic, 2003). Ages 12+. Illustrated by son Christopher Myers.
- Blues Journey (Holiday House, 2003). Ages 6–11. Illustrated by son Christopher Myers.
- The Dream Bearer (HarperCollins, 2003). Ages 10–14.
- The Beast (Scholastic, 2003). Ages 13+.
- Shooter (HarperCollins, 2004). Ages 13+. T
- I've Seen the Promised Land: the Life of Dr. Martin Luther King Jr. (HarperCollins, 2004). Ages 2–8. Illustrated by Leonard Jenkins.
- USS Constellation: Pride of the American Navy (Holiday House, 2004). Ages 10–13.
- Antarctica: Journeys to the South Pole (Scholastic, 2004). Ages 8–12.
- Here in Harlem: Poems in Many Voices (Holiday House, 2004). Age 12+.
- Autobiography of My Dead Brother (HarperCollins, 2005). Ages 13+. Illustrated by son Christopher Myers.
- "The Prom Prize" in Every Man for Himself: Ten Short Stories about Being a Guy edited by Nancy E. Mercado (2005).
- Harlem Hellfighters: When Pride Met Courage (HarperCollins, 2006). Ages 8–12. With Bill Miles
- Jazz (Holiday House, 2006). Ages 5–8. Illustrated by son Christopher Myers.
- Street Love (HarperCollins, 2006). Ages 13+.
- Harlem Summer (Scholastic, 2007). Ages 9–14.
- What They Found: Love on 145th Street (Random House, 2007) Ages 14–17.
- Game (HarperCollins, 2008). Ages 8–12+.
- Sunrise Over Fallujah (Scholastic, 2008). Ages 13+.
- Ida B. Wells: Let the Truth be Told (HarperCollins, 2008). Ages 4–8. Illustrated by Bonnie Christensen.
- Amiri & Odette: A Love Story (Scholastic, 2009). Ages 12+. Illustrated by Javaka Steptoe.
- Dope Sick (HarperCollins, 2009). Ages 13+
- Riot (Egmont USA, 2009). Ages 12+.
- Looking Like Me (Egmont USA, 2009). Ages 5–8. Illustrated by son Christopher Myers.
- Muhammad Ali: The People's Champion (HarperCollins, 2009). Ages 5–8. Illustrated by Alix Delinois.
- "Midnight Bus to Georgia" in This Family is Driving Me Crazy: Ten Stories about Surviving Your Family edited by M. Jerry Weiss and Helen S. Weiss (2009)
- Lockdown (HarperCollins, 2010). Ages 13+.
- The Cruisers (Scholastic, 2010). Ages 10–14. The News Crew Series.
- Kick (HarperCollins, 2011). Ages 13+. Co-authored with Ross Workman
- Looking for the Easy Life (HarperCollins, 2011). Ages 4–8. Illustrated by Lee Harper.
- We Are America: A Tribute from the Heart (HarperCollins, 2011). Ages 6–10. Written with son Christopher Myers.
- Carmen (Egmont USA, 2011). Ages 12+.
- The Cruisers Book 2: Checkmate (Scholastic, 2011). Ages 10–14. The News Crew Series.
- "Pirate" in Thriller (HarperCollins, 2011). Ages 8–12. Edited by Jon Scieszka. Illustrated by Brett Helquist. Guys Read Library of Great Reading Series.
- "Cage Run" in Pick-Up Game: A Full Day of Full Court edited by Mark Aronson and Charles R. Smith Jr. (Candlewick Press, 2011)
- All the Right Stuff (HarperCollins, 2012). Ages 13+.
- Just Write: Here's How! (HarperCollins, 2012) Ages 13+.
- The Cruisers Book 3: A Star is Born (2012). Ages 10–14. The News Crew Series.
- Forward to A Poem as Big as New York City: Little Kids Write About the Big Apple (2012)
- Introduction to A Time to Break Silence: The Essential Works of Martin Luther King, Jr., for Students (2013)
- Tags (HarperCollins, 2013). Ages 13+.
- The Get Over (HarperTeen Impulse, 2013).
- Darius & Twig (HarperCollins, 2013). Ages 13+.
- The Cruisers Book 4: Oh, Snap! (Scholastic, 2013). Ages 10–14. The News Crew Series.
- Invasion (Scholastic, 2013). Ages 12+. World War II.
- On A Clear Day (Crown Books for Young Readers, 2014). Ages 12+.
- Juba! (Crown Books for Young Readers, 2015). Ages 12+.
- "Roach" in Taking Aim: Power and Pain, Teens and Guns edited by Michael Cart (HarperTeen, 2015)
- Frederick Douglass: The Lion Who Wrote History (HarperCollins, 2017). Illustrated by Floyd Cooper.
- "Sometimes a Dream Needs a Push" in Flying Lessons and Other Stories, edited by Ellen Oh (Crown Books for Young Readers, 2017). Ages 8–12.
