= Physician's oath =

Physician's oath may refer to:

- Declaration of Geneva
- Hippocratic Oath
- Oath of Maimonides
- Osteopathic Oath
