= Hippocratic Oath (disambiguation) =

The Hippocratic Oath is the tradition of ethical oaths for medical practitioners.

Hippocratic Oath may also refer to:

- "Hippocratic Oath" (DS9 episode), an episode within the Star Trek franchise
- Hippocratic Oath for scientists, a form of the medical oath, adapted for scientists

== See also ==
- Charaka shapath or Charaka oath, similar oaths in traditional Indian medicine
