= Michael Stern =

Michael Stern may refer to:

- Michael Stern (conductor) (born 1959), American musician
- Michael Stern (educator) (1922–2002), founder of the Waterford Kamhlaba United World College
- Michael Stern (journalist) (1910–2009), American journalist and philanthropist
- Michael Stern (British politician) (born 1942), British Conservative Party politician
- Michael Stern (real estate developer) (born 1979), American real estate developer
- Michael Stern (born 1947), American writer in the team Jane and Michael Stern
- Michael Stern (Jamaican politician), Jamaica Labour Party politician
- Michael Stern (zoologist), American zookeeper, conservationist, anthropologist and primatologist
- Mike Stern (born 1953), American jazz guitarist

== See also ==
- Mikhail Stern (1918–2005), Soviet dissident
- Michael Stearns (disambiguation)
