= Mordechai Rosenstein =

American Jewish calligrapher and painter

- Born: March 26, 1934; Philadelphia, Pennsylvania, U.S.
- Died: July 9, 2024 (aged 90); Elkins Park, Pennsylvania, U.S.
- Education: Akiba Hebrew Academy; Philadelphia Museum School of Art
- Known for: Hebrew calligraphy, Jewish art, illuminated texts
- Spouse: Mati Kaufman Rosenstein
- Children: Lisa Rosenstein, Judah Rosenstein

Mordechai Rosenstein (March 26, 1934 – July 9, 2024) was an American Jewish calligrapher and visual artist. A pioneer of contemporary Hebrew calligraphic art in the United States, he created more than 700 original works influenced by abstract expressionism and pop art. His work was exhibited internationally and commissioned by major Jewish institutions, including a presentation piece from B'nai B'rith International for Pope Benedict XVI.

== Early life and education ==
Rosenstein was born on March 26, 1934, in the Strawberry Mansion neighborhood of Philadelphia, Pennsylvania, to an American-born mother and a Russian immigrant father. He attended Akiba Hebrew Academy, later known as Jack M. Barrack Hebrew Academy, and graduated as part of the school's first graduating class in 1951. While a student there, he began creating a Purim megillah using a self-taught method of Hebrew lettering. He later recalled that there were few local models or instructional materials available for Hebrew scribal art in Philadelphia.

Rosenstein later studied at the Philadelphia Museum School of Art, where he learned figure drawing, color theory, weaving, painting, and silkscreen printing. He was influenced by the abstract expressionist painter Franz Kline, who taught at the school and whose approach to black-and-white composition shaped Rosenstein's later emphasis on both the forms of the letters and the spaces around them.

== Career ==
After art school, Rosenstein served for two years in the United States Army, where he drew training aids for weapons and equipment. He then moved to New York City and worked in the textile industry as an assistant stylist while continuing to make calligraphic art on his own time. For his wedding to Mati Kaufman, he created an illuminated ketubah, or Jewish marriage contract, and soon began making ketubot for other Jewish couples.

In 1967, Rosenstein returned to Philadelphia and became foreman of his uncle's frame factory, remaining there until the business was sold about a decade later. He subsequently ran a frame shop in Northeast Philadelphia. His professional breakthrough came in the 1970s, when Rita Poley, then associated with Gratz College and the Temple Judea Museum, began exhibiting his work. By 1979, Rosenstein had made his art a full-time career.

Rosenstein created more than 700 original works. Beginning in 2003, Barry Magen joined him as a business partner, helping operate the Rosenstein Gallery and work with synagogues, organizations, and private buyers. Rosenstein also traveled widely as an artist-in-residence and lecturer, leading workshops in which community members helped fill in sections of collaborative calligraphic works later presented to synagogues or communal institutions.

His work appeared in Jewish communities across the United States and abroad, including exhibitions and presentations in Zurich, Hong Kong, and London. He designed stained glass windows, ark doors, Torah mantles, memorial walls, builders' walls, and other synagogue installations. In 1990, Camp Ramah in the Poconos dedicated Rosenstein's first outdoor steel sculpture in honor of the camp's 40th anniversary.

The Jewish human rights organization B'nai B'rith International commissioned a work by Rosenstein as a gift for Pope Benedict XVI.

Rosenstein had a long association with the Jewish community of St. Louis. His work was present there by the 1980s, and the Jewish Community Center of St. Louis housed at least ten of his pieces. In 2008, he served as artist-in-residence at Congregation Shaare Emeth. His daughter Lisa Rosenstein later said that he considered St. Louis one of the friendliest communities he visited and valued its interested learners.

== Style and themes ==
Rosenstein's signature style used stretched, elongated, and manipulated Hebrew letters, with vivid colors and flowing lines woven through the forms. Commentators described his art as combining the visual energy of 1960s pop art with the heritage of medieval illuminated Hebrew manuscripts. His subjects included verses from the Torah, Psalms, Prophets, rabbinic literature, blessings, Jewish ethical teachings, and Hebrew phrases associated with Jewish values and lifecycle events.

Rosenstein frequently taught that Hebrew calligraphy derived from the letter yud, whose shape he presented as the foundation for many other Hebrew letterforms. He also emphasized the importance of the spaces surrounding the letters. In a 2021 artist statement for the Temple Judea Museum exhibition Moral Compass: Artists Respond to Crises, he wrote that the areas around the letters were as important as the letters themselves and created movement and dynamism in the composition. He connected this idea to what he had learned from Franz Kline, namely that every area of a canvas contributes to the whole work.

Although Rosenstein was best known for color, in 2020–2021 he began a new series with a number of black-and-white paintings, which he associated with the subdued mood of the COVID-19 pandemic. The controlled geometry and Hebrew letterforms for which he had long been known, gave way to looser forms, though the work remained recognizably his. By the fourth painting, as vaccines became available and optimism returned, he wrote that he again felt the need for color, "as we will again be carried "On Eagles Wings"". "On Eagles Wings" became the first painting in the series to include color, and the palette intensified in the works that followed.

After the October 7th, 2023 attacks in Israel, Rosenstein said he was moved by the resilience of the hostages according to his family, and began adorning his canvases with even more color, patterns and illumination. Lisa Rosenstein described his late work as shattering the letters into countless cells, like "an infinite universe of jewels and gems". The series was to become his final body of work, continuing until his death in 2024. It became known as the Chazzak series after his final painting, which depicted the phrase "Chazzak, Chazzak, V'nitchazek" ("Be strong, be strong, and let us be strengthened"), traditionally chanted at the conclusion of each of the five books of the Torah, during public Torah reading.

Among his best-known works so far, was a piece based on the biblical verse "Justice, justice, you shall pursue" from Deuteronomy 16:20. The work became a popular gift for Jewish lawyers and judges and was displayed in the office of Justice Ruth Bader Ginsburg. Another popular work depicted a physician's oath attributed to Maimonides, combining Hebrew and English text with a stylized portrait of the medieval rabbinic and medical figure. In 2026, the Rosenstein family announced that they will soon reveal hundreds of original works on canvas and paper that have never before been shared with the public.

== Personal life and death ==
Rosenstein was married to Mati Kaufman Rosenstein. They had two children, Judah Rosenstein and Lisa Rosenstein.

Rosenstein died on July 9, 2024, in Elkins Park, Pennsylvania, at the age of 90. He was survived by his wife, his two children, and two grandchildren.
