= Jewish medicine =

Medicine in Jewish culture

Jewish medicine is the practice of medicine among the Jewish people, which includes writing in both Hebrew and Arabic. As of 2024, 28% of Nobel Prize winners in medicine have been Jewish, even though Jews make up approximately 0.2% of the world's population.

== History ==
=== Ancient ===
There are no extant texts of ancient medicine, as a first subject, of Hebrew origin. There was no medicine distinctly Jewish and instead Jewish practitioners had adopted Greek and later Graeco-Roman knowledge as practice.

A text known as the "Book of Remedies" is recorded of in the Babylonian Talmud twice, and the baraita, evidently dating from at least the reign of Hezekiah. Likewise, a text known as Sefer Refuot, which means "book of remedies," is known. However, its composition has been dated roughly to the time of the Byzantine Empire, anywhere from 1,000 and 1,700 years after Hezekiah.

=== Middle Ages ===
==== Jewish Medicine in the Early Middle Ages ====
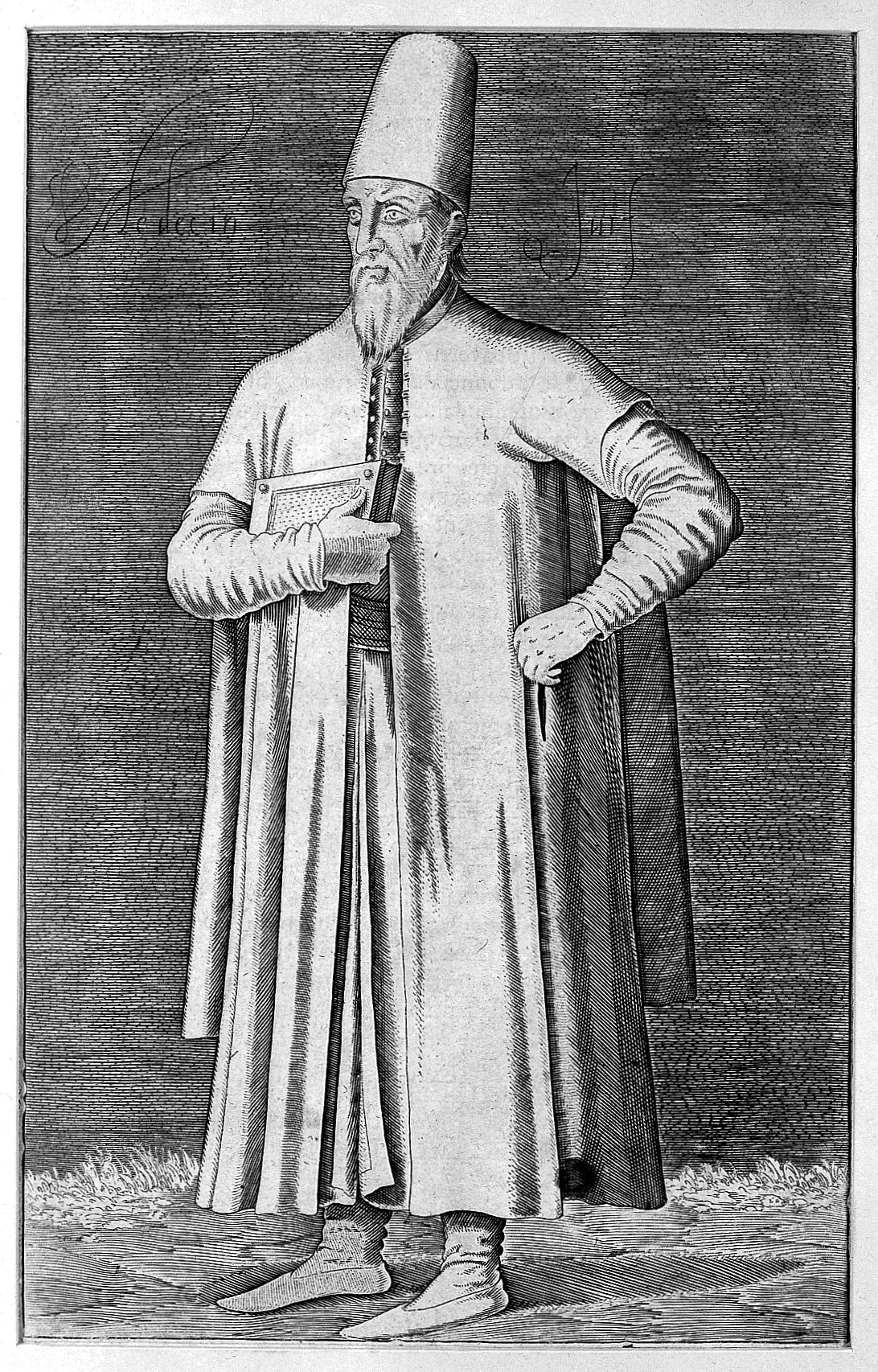
A Jewish physician in traditional costume, circa 1568; from the Wellcome Library

Unlike with the Greeks and Arabs, there was not a specifically Jewish medical tradition in antiquity and the early Middle Ages. Jewish medical authors were influential in their translation of Greek, Latin, and Arabic texts into Hebrew to create a unique Hebrew Medical corpus. A main exception to this is The Book of Remedies (Sefer 'Asaph), the earliest medical text written in Hebrew, by Asaph the Jew, although the definitive identity of the author and time period in which it was written remains a subject of debate among historians. The text comprises four parts; a story of the transmission of medicine from God to mankind, a medical survey, a Materia medica and a list of medical aphorisms. This book connects Jewish talmudic tradition to dominant medical theories and represents one of the earliest examples of a Jewish medical practice. While there is no knowledge of the writer himself or where the text was written, it circulated widely in Jewish communities during the Medieval period, and it can be assumed that it was of great influence to Jewish practitioners during this time. Similarly, Shabbetai Donnolo authored The Book of the Precious (Sefer ha-Yaqar) in Italy, detailing different medicines and remedies based on Greek medical practice, indicating some degree of Jewish medical practice in Christian Europe.

==== Jewish Scholarship and Practice in the Islamic Medical World (8th-14th Centuries) ====
In the medieval Islamic world, medicine was one of the most prominent and respected professions among Jews. The Cairo Genizah has preserved over 2,500 fragments related to medicine. There is clear evidence of Jewish students training under Muslim physicians, as well as Jewish practitioners serving non-Jewish patients, including in Islamic hospitals. These hospitals, secular in nature and often royal foundations, admitted patients regardless of religious affiliation and allowed non-Muslims to practice medicine within their walls.

While Jews did train with Muslim medical practitioners, they contributed to the development of medical knowledge by participating in the Arabic translation movement as early as the eighth century. Through this movement, Jewish medicine saw significant development in al-Andalus (Islamic Spain). From the 10th through early 12th centuries, Jewish physicians were active participants in the region's medical life, sometimes collaborating with Christian and Muslim counterparts. Ḥasday ibn Shaprut, a minister at the court of Caliph Abd al-Rahman III of Córdoba, was involved in translation work. He is known for successfully treating the obesity of Sancho of León, the grandson of the queen of Navarre. 11th-century Toledan qadi Said al-Andalusi later listed him among noteworthy Jewish scientists, describing him as a physician "whose cures were successful and his praise on everyone's lips." Also notable was Jonah ibn Janāḥ, who produced a pharmacological treatise (Kitāb al-Talkhīṣ) listing drugs in multiple languages. His work influenced Jonah ibn Biklārish, who composed a multilingual medical dictionary (Kitāb al-Mustaʿīnī) for the Muslim court in Zaragoza, in which he recorded hundreds of drugs and their properties. Joseph ibn 'Aqnīn, possibly born in Barcelona, later moved to Fez, Morocco, where he abridged Galen’s commentary on Hippocrates' Aphorisms, showing the transmission of classical medicine into Jewish scholarship.

Prominent Jewish physicians are also attested in North Africa and the Levant. Isaac Israeli (d. c. 955), originally from Faiyum, Egypt, served the Aghlabid and Fatimid courts in Kairouan (in modern Tunisia). He authored influential Arabic treatises on fevers, the pulse, urine, and materia medica, many of which were later translated into Latin, by Constantine the African, and Hebrew. His Kitāb al-Bawl (Book on Urine) was innovative in its physiological analysis and diagnostic use of uroscopy. He also wrote an ethical guide for physicians (Musar ha-Rof'im), emphasizing both moral conduct and bedside manner, integrating Talmudic traditions with Greek medical philosophies.

In 12th-century Egypt, Maimonides (1138–1204) became the physician to Qadi al-Fadil, chief counsellor to Saladin. He authored a range of medical works in Arabic, including clinical consilia (personalized medical advice) and treatises on preventative care, convalescence, and specific conditions such as asthma, hemorrhoids, and poisoning. His Sharḥ Asmāʾ al-ʿUqqār is a medical glossary listing drug names in Arabic, Greek, Persian, Spanish, Moroccan, Egyptian, and Berber, showing the multilingual environment of Jewish medical scholarship. He did not include the Hebrew drug names, despite using them in other texts. Maimonides also produced a summary of Galen's works and a commentary on Ḥunayn ibn Ishāq. Another noteworthy physician, Ibn Jumay' (d. c. 1198), served as private doctor to Saladin and wrote both a commentary on Avicenna's Canon of Medicine and a medical encyclopedia (Kitāb al-Irshād) focused on the welfare of body and soul.

Jewish physicians remained active in both clinical and scholarly medicine under the Mamluks. In Egypt, Al-Sadīd al-Dimyāṭī and Faraj Allāh ibn Saghīr, members of a long-serving Karaite family of court doctors, worked under Sultan Al-Nasir Muhammad. In Syria, Asad al-Yahūdī served Mamluk emirs. Earlier, Abū al-Faḍl Ibn Abī al-Bayān directed the Nāṣirī hospital in Cairo and authored a handbook on compound drugs for hospital use (al-Dustūr al-Bīmāristānī), while Abū al-Munā al-Kūhin al-ʿAṭṭār compiled a pharmacist's manual in 1260 (Minhāj al-Dukkān). Jewish medical scholarship also included works like Nuʿmān al-Isrāʾīlī's commentary on Abū Sahl al-Masīḥī's Book of the Hundred, and Solomon ibn Yaʿīsh's philologically rigorous commentary on Ibn Sīnā's Canon of Medicine.

In the early fourteenth century, a Jewish physician working under Ferdinand IV of Castile wrote the Book of Royal Catilian Medicine (Kitāb al-tibb al-qastālī al-malūkī). This book was composed of two sections, with the first one detailing medical theory and the practice of physicians, and the second part describing the treatments for common medical conditions in Castile.

==== Jewish Medical Practice in Western Europe and the Creation of a Hebrew Medical Corpus (12th and 13th Centuries) ====
In the mid-twelfth century, Jews from Al-Andalus moved to Christian-run northern Spain and southern France after the Almohads came to power in southern Iberia. They participated in significant cultural exchange with the Hebrew-speaking local Jewish community, leading to the translation of Arabic medical texts into Hebrew language. In the late twelfth century, this shift toward Hebrew language led to the creation of an organized Hebrew medical corpus. This not only emphasizes the centrality of Jews to the medical movement, but also the transmission of Arabic medical knowledge to Western European communities by way of Jewish practitioners. Not only were Arabic texts being translated into Hebrew, but also instrumental medical texts in Latin, Greek, and other vernacular languages.

With this increase in Hebrew translation in Western Europe, there was also a rise of Jewish physicians despite estimations that, from the mid-twelfth century on, Jews made up about one percent of society in Western Europe. Jewish physicians were desirable to Christians because they were seen as highly knowledgeable in medical theory. Jewish practitioners were often learned in both Greek and Arab medicine, and they built a reputation for "professional medicine," through the creation of the Hebrew medical corpus.

The translation of medical texts into Hebrew across Northern Africa, the Arab Empire, and Christian Europe represents the importance of medical literature to the Jewish community. Because, as Jews were denied admission to universities, they learned and trained from Hebrew medical texts. However Hebrew was less-developed than its Arabic and Latin counterparts, and was unable to provide the same amount of linguistic specification in medical texts. Physicians and scholars relied on Arabic and Latin terms to supplement the works, but Jewish scholars continued to translate works into Hebrew to benefit Jewish physicians who relied on these translations.

==== Jewish Physicians in Christian Europe (14th and 15th Centuries) ====
Jewish physicians in esteemed positions were not uncommon in the Medieval period, as Jews often served aristocracy and even Christian clergy members. This allowed them a greater degree of influence, not only confined to the medical sphere. Highly regarded Jewish physicians would act as unofficial political advisors, and would sometimes even advocates for the Jewish community.

Jewish physicians in Western Europe would serve both Jews and non-Jews. Throughout the fourteenth century, Jews were faced with increased restrictions on their practice, such as a physician licensing process through universities, which Jews were not allowed to enroll in. Contrary to this, documentation indicates that many Jews were still able to obtain licensing through private instruction. In Jewish communities, medical apprenticeships studied Hebrew literature on Arabic and Greek medical theory. These trainings were passed down from father to son or son-in-law, forming extensive Jewish "medical dynasties." There were instances where marriage contracts included agreements with a bride's father to teach medicine to his son-in-law, such as between Moses Bonsegnor and Bonjuda Durant in France. In 1337, the Council of Avignon and Robert of Provence enacted various restrictions on Jewish medical practice and licensing. Throughout the fourteenth and fifteenth centuries, bans on Jewish medical practice were passed by both church and secular authorities. These were later revoked due to a shortage of physicians, demonstrating the need for Jewish physicians to serve Christian communities.

Unfounded fears surrounded Jewish physicians in the Medieval Europe. Some believed that Jews possessed magic healing qualities in association with Jewish kabbalistic tradition. Mythology about the supernatural abilities of Jews circulated Christian communities, with some accusing Jews of demonology. Jews did have a magical and superstitious tradition that came across in their healing practices. Within the Jewish practice, amulets and talmudic incantations were called segullot, cures that have no logical explanation. Jews were also accused of causing disease to harm Christians. This was particularly prevalent during the Black Death, where several Jews were accused of poisoning drinking wells and faced widespread pogroms in Western Europe.

==== Women's Health, Gynecology, and Female Practitioners ====
The translation and transmission of gynecological medical texts was seen in both Latin and Arabic documents within the Jewish medical practice. In the early twelfth century, Latin gynecological texts known as the Trotula, attributed to Trota of Salerno, were written in Italy. These texts circulated throughout Europe and underwent many translations, including "The Hidden [Places] of Women" (Sitrei nashim), likely based on the Trotula. Additionally, Arabic gynecological texts were also translated or interpreted by Jewish physicians, such as 'Arib ibn Sa'îd on Obstetrics.

There were also original manuscripts written by Jewish practitioners on gynecological medicine, including Record of Diseases Occurring in the Genital Members (Zikhron ha-holayim ha-hovim bi-khlei ha-herayon) which details treatments for both male and female ailments, including "suffocation of the womb" and afflictions associated with menstruation. The author writes about different herbs and remedies that can be prepared, as well as the effect of individual temperaments. The text includes aspects of Galenic humoral medicine and their intersections with talmudic tradition and Arabic medical terms. Similarly, The Treatise on Generation, Called the Secret of Conception (Ha-ma'mar ba-toladah niqra sof ha-'ibbur ) addresses both male and female medical issues, detailing treatments to help with fertility. Some Jewish gynecological texts were seen to violate aspects of Jewish religious law with sections on abortion and contraception.

Though advances were made in gynecology during the Middle Ages, the texts about gynaecology were written using the masculine form of Hebrew, indicating that gynecological texts were directed towards male doctors, not female midwives. In the thirteenth-century manuscript, Dinah's Book on All that Concerns the Womb and its Sickness (Sefer Dinah le-khol 'inyan ha-rehem ve-holayehah), the book's namesake, Dinah, comes to represent the "spokesperson" for women's health and medicine within medieval texts. Despite this, the instructions are directed towards male practitioners. The only mention of midwives in these texts seems to be when direct contact with a woman's genitalia is necessary; only then do texts specifically mention the women involved in the procedure. In one instance, a text advised the doctor to "order the midwife to massage the orifice of her womb" with the herbs mentioned.

Female practitioners contributed significantly both to the practice of medicine inside and outside of Jewish communities, and to the body of medical knowledge in Jewish community and beyond. From the surviving texts, it would seem that the greatest occurrence of female medical practitioners was during the 14th and 15th centuries. While women contributed to the advancement of Jewish medicine during this time, there were still a number of restrictions placed on them by society. No Jew, male or female, was permitted to attend a Christian university. This could be bypassed by taking an examination and acquiring a licentia curandi et practicandi, a license to practice medicine. In at least one case, this examination was specifically directed towards Jews who would work with Christian patients.

As a result, the education of these women largely fell to their male relatives. Hava (also known as Hana), a Manoesque woman mentioned for her "medical capacity" in a document dated to the early 1320s, and Virdimura, a Sicilian who obtained her medical license in 1376, were female Jewish practitioners whose direct relatives—Hava's husband and sons, Virdimura's husband—were practitioners as well. Jewish medical practitioners were often educated in Greek, Latin, Arabic, and Hebrew, which gave them access to medical texts that were often inaccessible to their Christian counterparts. Working as physicians, surgeons, and midwives, Jewish women were accepted as medical authorities in Paris, Florence, Naples, and Sicily, among other cities. Sara of St. Gilles, for instance, was a Jewish doctor who admitted a male Christian student, Salvetus de Burgonovo, in fourteenth century France. Shatzmiller believes this is enough evidence to indicate that Sara taught female students as well. Mayrona, a Jewish woman from Manoesque, France, is listed in over forty documents from 1342 as a phisica, or a licensed medical practitioner. Jewish midwives made up a larger percentage of practitioners in some regions than their population would suggest. In the French town of Marseille between 1390 and 1415, there are 24 known Jewish practitioners to 18 Christian ones; this is a shift from the period from 1337 to 1362 where Jewish doctors compromised approximately half of all practitioners in Marseille. In 1419, a physician named Sara was granted an official medical license. She was so accomplished that she accumulated much wealth from her practice and was highly regarded by both Jews and non-Jews in Germany.

Jewish practitioners participated in the exchange of knowledge between Christian and Muslim writers and practitioners. The degree to which Jewish women practiced midwifery in the Middle Ages depended largely on the areas in which they lived. In Iberia, for instance, Jews were well accustomed to a mix of Muslim, Christian, and their own Jewish culture. Along with this came a shared understanding of medicine; Jews living in this area even wrote medicinal texts in Judeo-Arabic (Arabic written in Hebrew letters) rather than standard Hebrew or the local vernacular Here, it was commonplace for Jewish midwives to work alongside Christian and Muslim women. However, Jewish women still faced adversity and discrimination on the basis of both their gender and their religion. This is more clearly demonstrated in Central Europe, where it is difficult to determine if Jewish midwives working for non-Jewish patients was common practice or, instead, the exception rather than the rule. In 1403, Floreta d’Ays, a Jewish midwife from Marseilles, was brought to court under charges of malpractice. This is the first such known case brought against a midwife and, according to Monica Green, an unusual case of anti-Jewish sentiment in an otherwise relatively tolerant town. While the result of the trial is unknown, it's clear that Floreta's non-Christian status played a part in the charges levied against her.

=== 17th century ===
The first organized study of Biblical medicine began during the 17th century.

=== 20th century ===
The famous doctor of psychiatry Sigmund Freud was Jewish by birth. Abraham Maslow was born to Russian Jewish parents during 1908.

== See also ==
- Jewish medical ethics
