= Osteopathic Oath =

Oath administered to osteopathic physicians in the United States

The Osteopathic Oath is an oath commonly administered to osteopathic physicians who practice osteopathic medicine in the United States. Similar to the Hippocratic Oath, it is a statement of professional values and ethics. The first version of the oath was created in 1938, and the current version of the oath has been in use since 1954. Although taking the oath is not required or legally binding, it is commonly seen as a rite of passage.

== History ==
The Oath was first developed in 1938 by a committee formed by the Associated Colleges of Osteopathy, headed by Frank E. MacCracken, DO. In 1954, some amendments were adopted to create the current text.

== Use ==
In the United States, all osteopathic medical schools administer the Osteopathic Oath, often in the context of a white coat ceremony. The Oath upholds the concepts of confidentiality, evidence-based medicine, and nonmaleficence. It also specifically forbids euthanasia but does not address abortion.

In a 2000 survey of United States medical schools, all of the then extant medical schools administered some type of professional oath. Among allopathic schools, sixty-two of one hundred twenty-two used the Hippocratic Oath or a modified version of it. The other sixty schools used the original or modified Declaration of Geneva, Oath of Maimonides, or an oath authored by students and or faculty. All nineteen osteopathic schools used the Osteopathic Oath.

Like the Hippocratic Oath and similar professional oaths, the Osteopathic Oath is not legally binding, nor is it required in order to become a practicing physician. However, reciting the Oath is considered an important rite of passage for a new osteopathic physician.

== Text ==
I do hereby affirm my loyalty to the profession I am about to enter. I will be mindful always of my great responsibility to preserve the health and the life of my patients, to retain their confidence and respect both as a physician and a friend who will guard their secrets with scrupulous honor and fidelity, to perform faithfully my professional duties, to employ only those recognized methods of treatment consistent with good judgment and with my skill and ability, keeping in mind always nature's laws and the body's inherent capacity for recovery.

I will be ever vigilant in aiding in the general welfare of the community, sustaining its laws and institutions, not engaging in those practices which will in any way bring shame or discredit upon myself or my profession. I will give no drugs for deadly purposes to any person, though it be asked of me.

I will endeavor to work in accord with my colleagues in a spirit of progressive cooperation and never by word or by act cast imputations upon them or their rightful practices.

I will look with respect and esteem upon all those who have taught me my art. To my college I will be loyal and strive always for its best interests and for the interests of the students who will come after me. I will be ever alert to further the application of basic biologic truths to the healing arts and to develop the principles of osteopathy which were first enunciated by Andrew Taylor Still.

== See also ==
- Declaration of Helsinki
- Medical ethics
- Nightingale Pledge
- Nuremberg code
- Oath of Asaph
- Physician's Oath
- Primum non nocere
