= Asaph the Jew =

Ancient Jewish physician and medical author

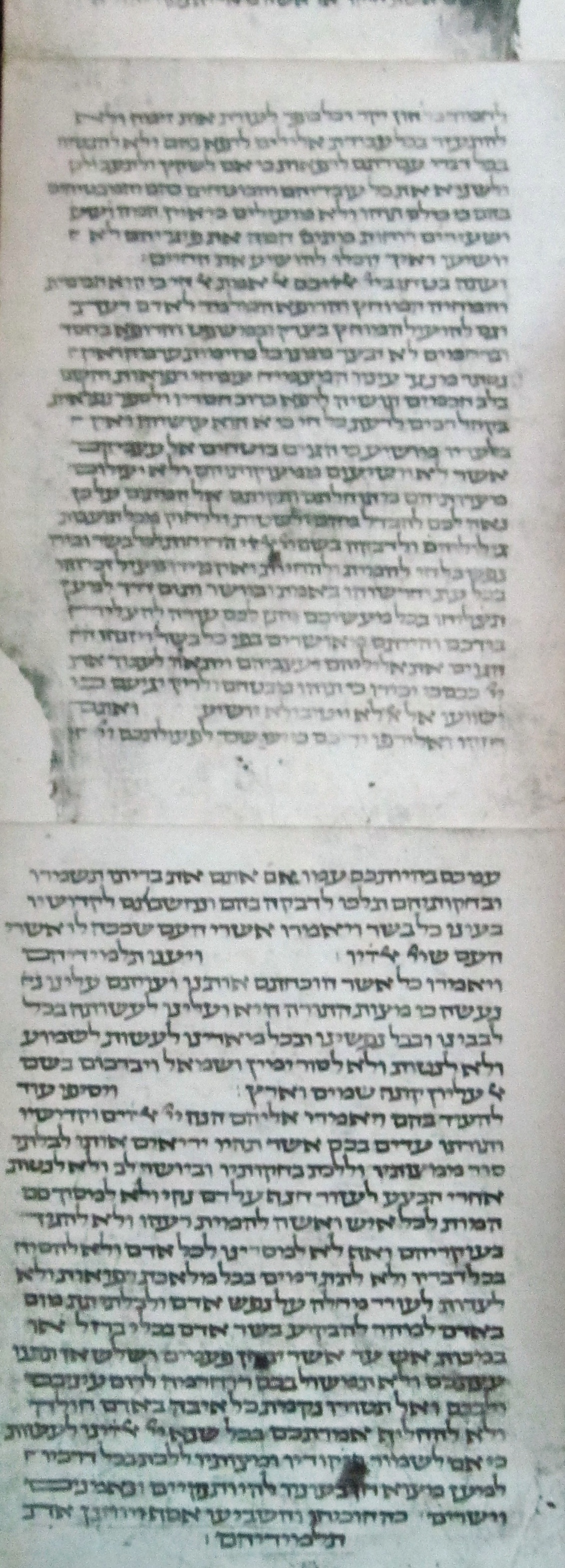
medical oath of Asafa ha-Rofe

Asaph the Jew (English: /ˈeɪ.sæfˈðəˈdʒu/ Ay-saf, Hebrew: אסף היהודי Asaph HaYehudi), also known as Asaph ben Berechiah and Asaph the Physician (Hebrew: אסף הרופא Asaph HaRofè) is a figure mentioned in the ancient Jewish medical text the Sefer Refuot (lit. “Book of Medicines”).

== Biography ==
Asaph is regarded by some scholars as a Byzantine Jew and possibly the earliest known Hebrew medical writer. However, Asaph remains an uncertain figure. Some have attempted to identify him with the legendary Asif ibn Barkhiya, a mystical vizier in Arabian folklore associated with King Solomon. Scholars who support Asaph's historicity suggest that he may have lived between the 3rd and 7th centuries CE, possibly in Byzantine Palaestina or Mesopotamia. The Sefer Refu'ot itself places Asaph between Hippocrates and Pedanius Dioscorides, which—if interpreted chronologically—might imply he was believed to have lived between the 5th century BCE and the 1st century CE, though this remains speculative.

== Works ==
Sefer Refu'ot, the only known historical Jewish text to mention Asaph (and possibly authored by him), is the earliest known Hebrew medical work and is considered a significant milestone in the history of Jewish medicine. This book, also known as the Book of Asaph, seeks to integrate medical practice with Jewish tradition, describing the transmission of medical knowledge as originating from God. It includes a glossary of medicinal substances that contributed significantly to the development of Hebrew medical terminology.

The "Oath of Asaph" found in the text resembles the Hippocratic Oath and in part also Charaka Samhita (in Sanskrit), and was taken by medical students at their graduation.

== Legacy ==
The Yitzhak Shamir Medical Center of Israel was named after him until 2017.
