= Jack M. Barrack Hebrew Academy =

Private, Jewish day school in Bryn Mawr, PA, United States

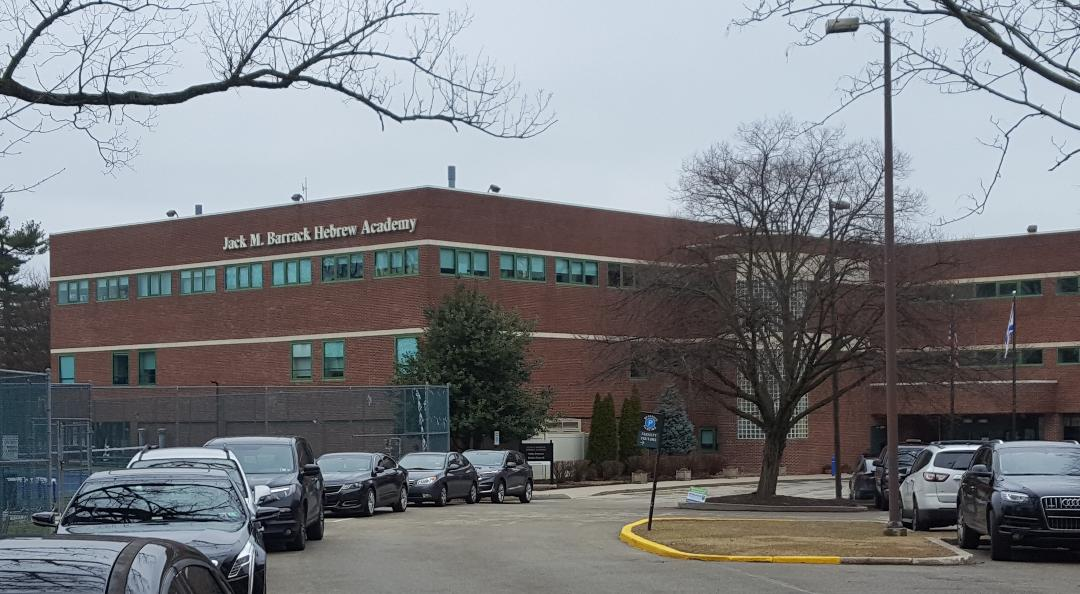

Location
- 272 S Bryn Mawr Avenue; Bryn Mawr, PA 19010; United States; 40.016786°N 75.327536°W

Information
- Type: Private, jewish day school & college prep
- Religious affiliation: Jewish
- Established: 1946
- President: Lisa B. Sandler
- Head of school: Rabbi Marshall Lesack
- Faculty: 95
- Grades: 6–12
- Gender: Co-ed
- Enrollment: 410 total 280 Upper School; 130 Middle School
- Student to teacher ratio: 13:1
- Campus: Suburban
- Colors: Blue and White
- Athletics: Baseball, Basketball, Cross-Country, Frisbee, Golf, Lacrosse, Soccer, Softball, Swimming, Tennis and Track and Field
- Athletics conference: Friends Schools League
- Mascot: Cougar
- Nickname: Cougars
- School fees: Activity: $400; Security: $675; Technology: $400; Graduation: $475; PTO: $36 per family
- Tuition: Grades 6-12: $33,600–$41,100
- Website: www.jbha.org

Jack M. Barrack Hebrew Academy is a private, coeducational, college-preparatory and religiously pluralistic Jewish day school, located in Bryn Mawr, Pennsylvania, United States.

Founded in Center City, Philadelphia in 1946 as Akiba Hebrew Academy, the school renamed itself in 2007. It is the oldest pluralistic Jewish secondary school in the United States.

== History ==
=== Center City, Strawberry Mansion and Wynnefield, 1946–1956 ===
Akiba Hebrew Academy was founded in 1946 by a group of individuals, primarily Conservative rabbis, active in the Philadelphia Jewish community, including Dr. Joseph Levitsky, Har Zion Temple's Rabbi Simon Greenberg, Rabbi Elias Charry, and Dr. Leo L. Honor. The school was originally located in rented rooms at the YM & YWHA at Broad and Pine Streets in Center City, Philadelphia.

The school was founded without a connection to any Jewish denomination. According to Dr. Harold Gorvine, Akiba's founders created the school with the view "that all Jewish children – affiliated and non-affiliated – should come together under one roof to study their common Jewish heritage while simultaneously learning to respect all positions...This objective was not intended to blur differences. Rather, it was intended to strengthen the Jewish identification of every student without compelling acceptance of one particular interpretation of what is "THE" Jewish way of life." To fit this vision, the school took a middle of the ground approach to certain Jewish practices to ensure the school would remain pluralistic. For example, no school prayer was required and kippot were only required in Jewish classes. The first year consisted of 20 boys and girls. The school graduated its first class of 14 students in 1951; the first commencement ceremony was held at Temple University's Auditorium at Broad and Berks Streets.

The founding of Akiba marked a point when enough Jewish leaders believed that Jews had been incorporated into American society that they were willing to create a school solely for Jews. The founding of Akiba was met with opposition from some within Philadelphia's Jewish community, particularly from the reform Jewish community. Philadelphia Jewish leaders believed in American assimilation through the public school system and judged Jewish day schools to be parochial, un-American, and ghettoizing. Philadelphia's Jewish Federation would refuse to fund the institution until 1953.

Akiba was founded as a progressive school, which a 1946 brochure for the school described as "the needs, interests and aspirations of the individual pupil are the school’s primary concern." The school hired Dr. Joseph Butterweck, the dean at the Temple University School of Education and a leading figure in progressive education, as an advisor for general studies. Part of Butterweck's progressive curriculum included a "core class", which encouraged students to research and discuss topics. Butterweck's curriculum also encouraged democratic participation from students including a student government (made up of three branches: executive, legislative and judicial) that held power within the school. Due to Butterweck's position at Temple, he was able to recruit quality teachers to teach secular subjects. However, for the school's first 10 years, Judaic teachers were only hired on a part-time basis.

After four years at the Center City site, Akiba's enrollment had grown significantly and moved to B’nai Jeshurun at 2127 N 33rd Street in Strawberry Mansion, Philadelphia. Enrollment grew to 100 in 1951 with 15 faculty members when Louis Newman succeeded Dr Irving Argus as school principal. Newman was also the camp director of Camp Ramah in Wisconsin, until he was named the first director of the Melton Center for Research in Jewish Education at The Jewish Theological Seminary in 1963.

The school's Strawberry Mansion neighborhood was facing urban decay and economic decline and the school's enrollment fell. The school moved to Har Zion Temple at 54th and Wynnefield Avenues until a permanent location for the school could be established in 1956.

=== Merion, 1956-2008 ===
In April 1956, Akiba purchased a 5.3-acre (21,000 m^{2}) estate on North Highland Avenue in Merion Station, on the Main Line for $105,000. The property had once been part of a large estate called "Ashdale," which had been built by William Simpson, a 19th-century insurance entrepreneur. After Simpson died in 1909, his family broke up the estate, and the McMenamin family purchased a 5.3-acre (21,000 m^{2}) section on which they built a mansion that they named "Drake Linden Hall." After extensive renovations, the school dedicated its new foyer, classrooms, library, and science laboratory in December 1958.

In 1967, Elie Wiesel spoke to Akiba's graduating class as the commencement speaker.

Philadelphia's Jewish population continued to grow in the western suburbs in the 1960s, and the city's Federation of Jewish Charities purchased a 22-acre campus at City Line Avenue and Haverford Road in 1971 from the Country Day School of the Sacred Heart at which the Jewish Y had previously leased space for its summer day camp. With both the Solomon Schechter Day School's and Akiba's enrollment growing, Federation considered relocating both schools to the campus. Rather than move, Akiba opted to expand and build at its Merion campus, and beginning in November 1974, Akiba's campus underwent an expansion process that included the construction of a new building, library, and auditorium. The $1.0 million project tripled the physical size of the facility adding 13 new classrooms and a gymnasium. The expansion enabled the middle school to return from classrooms at Adath Israel synagogue across the street back across North Highland Avenue, and allowed space for continued growth in enrollment. The building project was spearheaded by then-Akiba parent and Board vice president Seymour Kaplan who served as general contractor for the expansion and worked directly on-site. The new classrooms were opened for the fall 1975 semester.

Enrollment grew to 290 students in 1979, and from 303 in 1990 to 357 students in 1991.

As a result of growing enrollment, the school began the process of expanding again. In 1992, the school purchased 1.1 acres (4,500 m^{2}) in adjacent land as part of their plans to acquire neighboring properties to expand athletic facilities. This acquisition expanded Akiba to about 7.5 acres (30,000 m^{2}) of land. Efforts to expand the school building in April 1994 were unsuccessful as Lower Merion Township declined Akiba's request to be exempted from four township building codes. In October 1994, a committee for expanding the school found that the options to expand the school included expanding the school to the former Solomon Schecter Day School that was located across the street, moving to the campus of either Gratz College in Melrose Park or to a vacated high school in Conshohocken and constructing a third story onto the school.

Following his retirement from professional basketball in Europe, Joe Bryant served as head coach of Akiba's varsity women's basketball team during the 1992–1993 season. His son, Kobe Bryant, who went on to become an 18-time NBA All-Star and the 2008 NBA Most Valuable Player, was a freshman at Lower Merion High School and often met his father at the Akiba gym after practices.

As Akiba's campus groaned under leaking ceilings, drafty windows, and limited athletic fields, the school sought to raise $6.4 million to renovate and expand. The school was approached by the Perelman Family Foundation in 1998 and offered a $2.0 million donation on condition that the school change its name to honor the Perelman family. After vocal student objections, Akiba was compelled to decline the offer. In February 2007, the school accepted a gift of $5 million from Leonard and Lynne Barrack's charitable organization, the Barrack Foundation and renamed itself "Jack M. Barrack Hebrew Academy," after Leonard's older brother, who died in a plane crash at age 27 in 1960. The $5 million gift to the school was given under the condition that 90% of the funds will be allocated towards a scholarship fund. The school was officially renamed on September 10, 2007 at the Jewish Federation of Greater Philadelphia's Radnor Campus in Bryn Mawr.

In September 2008, Barrack sold the property to the Jewish Federation of Greater Philadelphia for $4 million. At the time of sale, the mansion measured 20,247 square feet (1,881.0 m^{2}), including additions made in the mid-1970s such as the gym and the new classroom building. Kohelet Yeshiva High School purchased the mansion in 2010 and has since renovated it and the adjoining buildings.

=== Bryn Mawr, 2008-present ===
For several years, Akiba was looking to move to a new location to help facilitate the school's growing enrollment and to ensure its facilities remained up to par with other private schools in the area. In July 2007, the Jewish Federation of Greater Philadelphia announced the purchase of the campus of American College in Bryn Mawr, Pennsylvania. The American College site is 35 acres (140,000 m^{2}) on Bryn Mawr Avenue in Radnor Township and contains six buildings, walking trails and an arboretum. The school inaugurated the new building with a "Hanukat HaBayit" on September 14, 2008 at which U.S. Congressman Joe Sestak addressed the crowd.

In 2013, the Robert Saligman Middle School, which was located in Melrose Park, Pennsylvania and a part of the Schechter Day School Network, was integrated into Barrack. Barrack opened a STEM lab in 2015 featuring 3D printers, laser cutters and a solar energy research center. Barrack dedicated a new multipurpose, artificial turf athletic field with high school soccer and lacrosse lines in September 2018. Following stints with the Philadelphia 76ers and Portland Trail Blazers as an executive, the school hired Ben Falk to serve as Barrack's boy's varsity basketball coach. He coached the team from 2018 to 2021.

The school celebrated its 70th anniversary in 2016; at the time the school had 380 students enrolled with 100 faculty and counted 2,700 alumni. A gala celebration was held in March 2017.

Mrs. Sharon P. Levin served as the Head of School from 2011 to 2021. In 2021, she was replaced by Rabbi Marshall Lesack, a Barrack graduate, as the new Head of School. She was preceded by Mr. Oscar Divinsky, Dr. Irving Agus, Mr. Lou Newman, Dr. Diana Reisman, Dr. Steven Lorch, Rabbi Marc Rosenstein, Rabbi Phillip Field, and Dr. Steven Brown.

The Barrack Family Foundation made an additional $10 million gift to the school in 2025 enabling the institution to purchase part of its Bryn Mawr campus that it previously rented from the Jewish Federation of Greater Philadelphia. The school plans to use the funds to renovate its performance arts center and construct a new learning center and fitness facility.

== Current school ==
Barrack Hebrew Academy is accredited by the Middle States Association of Colleges and Schools, and the Pennsylvania Department of Education, and is a member of the National Association of Independent Schools.

Barrack students in 11th grade have the option to study abroad for the first semester of school at Alexander Muss High School in Israel. Barrack students have studied at Muss since 1994. From the introduction of the Israel study option in the 1980s through 1993, students had attended Tichon Ramah Yerusalayim (T.R.Y.) in Jerusalem.

Barrack men's and women's sports teams, the Cougars, play in the Friends’ Schools League. The school has 15 male and female varsity sports teams.

Rabbi Marshall Lesack is the current head of school. Barrack alumnus Dr. Matthew Dorsch leads the Middle School.

It was announced in February 2026 that Barrack would merge in 2027 with Perelman Jewish Day School, the pre-K-5th-grade institution that was previously a Solomon Schechter Day School, and has long served as a feeder school to Barrack. Rabbi Lesack, current Barack head of school will serve as head of school to the combined institution which will maintain the schools' three campuses. The schools will begin to unify their admissions and fundraising during the 2026-2027 academic year.

== Notable alumni ==
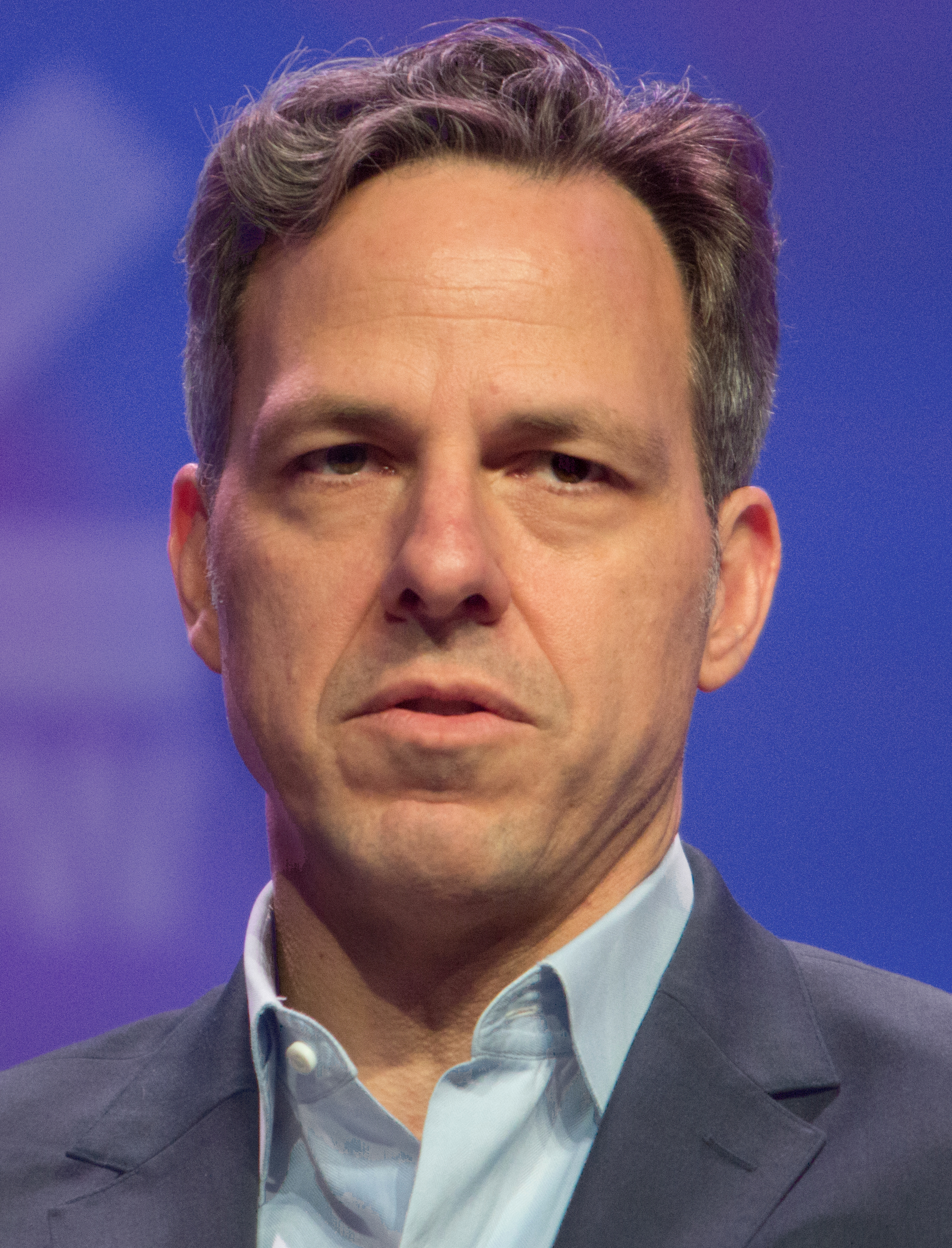
Jake Tapper, Lead Washington anchor for CNN

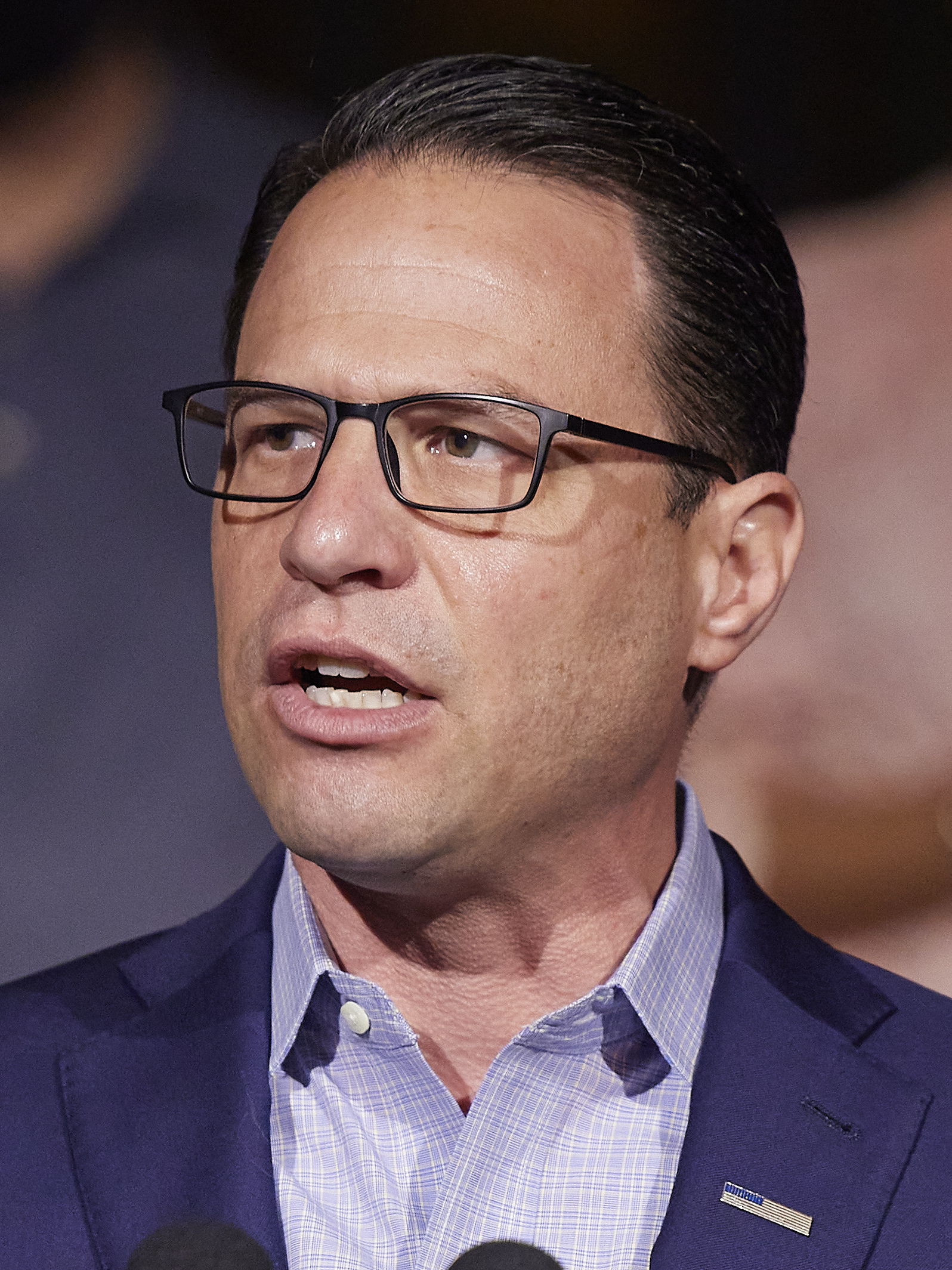
Josh Shapiro, Governor of Pennsylvania

- David Agus - physician and New York Times bestselling author
- Mitch Albom - author, journalist, radio talk show host
- Leonard Barrack - attorney and former National Finance Chairman of the Democratic National Committee (1998–2004)
- David Bedein - investigative journalist
- Chaim Bloom - President of Baseball Operations of the St. Louis Cardinals
- Dan Bricklin - computer scientist
- Uri Caine - pianist
- Rob Charry - sports talk host for 94 WIP
- David Diamond - screenwriter and producer
- Jamie Geller - cookbook author
- Gideon Glick - Broadway performer known for his role in To Kill a Mockingbird
- Steven Goldman - clinical neuroscientist
- Jonathan Hoffman - investment banker
- Alison Klayman - filmmaker and journalist
- Aaron Krause - founder and CEO of Scrub Daddy
- Eli Lake - journalist
- Ivan Levingston - journalist at Bloomberg News
- Deborah Pellow - anthropologist
- Fred Raskin - film editor
- Mordechai Rosenstein - calligrapher and visual artist
- Barnett Rubin - political scientist, author and director of the Center on International Cooperation at New York University
- Josh Shapiro - Governor of Pennsylvania (2023–present) and Pennsylvania Attorney General (2017–2023)
- Lori Shapiro - First Lady of Pennsylvania (2023–present)
- Michael Stern - anthropologist, primatologist, conservationist, and zookeeper at the Philadelphia Zoo
- Jacob Sullum - Editor, Reason magazine
- Jake Tapper - Anchor of CNN weekday television news show The Lead with Jake Tapper and the Sunday morning affairs program State of the Union
- David Weissman - screenwriter and producer
- David Wolpe - rabbi and author
- Paul Root Wolpe - sociologist, bioethicist, and professor at Emory University
- Jeremiah Zagar - filmmaker of films including We the Animals, In a Dream and Hustle

== Notable faculty ==
- Joe Bryant - girls' basketball coach
- Ben Falk - boys' basketball coach
- Simon Greenberg - rabbi, scholar and co-founder of Barrack
- Hershel Matt - rabbi
