= Vejjavatapada =

Buddhist medical doctor's oath

Vejjavatapada, the Buddhist medical doctor's oath, is an oath to be taken by Buddhist doctors and other professionals working with the sick.

Composed by Shravasti Dhammika using text from the Pāḷi Canon, it serves as an ethical commitment similar to that of the Hippocratic Oath, the Japanese Seventeen Rules of Enjuin and the Jewish Oath of Asaph. The original oath is in Pāḷi, a Middle Indo-Aryan language current in north-east India during the first half of the first millennium BCE, and now the liturgical language of Theravada Buddhism. The oath consists of a preamble followed by seven articles, each of them derived from four passages from the Pāḷi Canon.

== Original ==
The original Pāḷi reads:

Vuttāni hetāni Bhagavatā: "Ārogyaparamā lābhā" ti ceva: "Yo maṁ upaṭṭhaheyya so gilānaṁ upaṭṭhaheyyā" ti ca.

(A) Aham-pi: "Ārogyaparamā lābhā" ti maṭṭāmi, Tathāgataṁ upaṭṭhātukāmomhi, tasmāhaṁ mayhaṁ vejjakammena ārogyabhāvaṁ vaḍḍhemi ceva gilānaṁ hitāya dayena anukampāya upaṭṭhahāmi.

(B) Paṭibalo bhavissāmi bhesajjaṁ saṁvidhātuṁ.

(C) Sappāyāsappāyaṁ jānissāmi, asappāyaṁ apanāmessāmi; sappāyaṁ upanāmessāmi, asappāyaṁ nāpanāmessāmi.

(D) Mettacitto gilānaṁ upaṭṭhahissāmi, no āmisantaro.

(E) Ajegucchī bhavissāmi uccāraṁ vā passāvaṁ vā vantaṁ vā kheḷaṁ vā nīharituṁ.

(F) Paṭibalo bhavissāmi, gilānaṁ kālena kālaṁ, Dhammiyā kathāya sandassetuṁ samādapetuṁ samuttejetuṁ sampahaṁsetuṁ.

(G) Sace gilānaṁ sappāyabhojanehi vā sappāyabhessajjehi vā sappāyūpaṭṭhānena vā na vuṭṭhāheyya, aham-pi kho tassa gilānassa anukampāya patirūpo upaṭṭhāko bhavissāmī ti.

== English Translation ==
Rendered in English, this is translated as:

The Lord said: "Health is the greatest gain." He also said: "He who would minister to me should minister to the sick."

I too think that health is the greatest gain and I would minister to the Buddha. Therefore:

(A) I will use my skill to restore the health of all beings with sympathy, compassion and heedfulness.

(B) I will be able to prepare medicines well.

(C) I know what medicine is suitable and what is not. I will not give the unsuitable, only the suitable.

(D) I minister to the sick with a mind of love, not out of desire for gain.

(E) I remain unmoved when I have to deal with stool, urine, vomit or spittle.

(F) From time to time I will be able to instruct, inspire, enthuse, and cheer the sick with the Teaching.

(G) Even if I cannot heal a patient with the proper diet, proper medicine and proper nursing I will still minister to him, out of compassion.

== Origin ==
The Vejjavatapada is derived from four passages from the Pāḷi Canon dating from between circa 5th and the 3rd centuries BCE, each of them attributed to the Buddha. The preamble contains two quotes from the Pali Canon, the first line of verse 204 of the Dhammapada, and from the Vinaya, where the Buddha, after having attended to a sick monk neglected by his fellows, instructed his monks to care for each other when they are sick.

The Pāḷi Canon contains a considerable amount of information about sickness, health, medicine, healing, medical care and medical ethics. Because early Buddhism did not claim that all physical conditions, injury and illness included, are necessarily caused by past karma, it saw the physicians role to be a vital one.

The Buddha mentioned a range of causes of sickness of which only one is karma; the others being an imbalance in one or another of the four humors; i.e. bile (pitta), phlegm (sema), wind (vāta); an imbalance of all three (sannipāta), seasonal changes (utu), stronger than normal stress (visamaparihāra), and external agencies (opakkamika), e.g. accidents. On other occasions the Buddha mentioned that inappropriate diet and overeating can likewise cause sickness while intelligent eating habits can contribute to "freedom from sickness and affliction, health, strength and comfortable living."

The Buddha praised the competent physician and nurse in these words: "Those who tend the sick are of great benefit (to others)." Because the Pāḷi Canon predates the separation and specialization of the medical profession as presented in āyurvedic treatises, it rarely makes a distinction between the doctor or physician (bhisakka, tikicchaka, vejja) and the nurse (gilānaupaṭṭhāka). At that time the doctor probably performed all the functions in the sick room, including that of nursing patients.

== Explanation ==
Of the following articles, the first five are based closely on a discourse in which the Buddha lays down the attitudes and skills which would make "one who would wait on the sick qualified to nurse the sick.". The final article is taken from the discourse in which the Buddha describes three types of patients according to their response to treatment:

- One who dies whether he gets proper treatment or not
- One who recovers whether he gets proper treatment or not
- One who recovers only if he gets proper treatment.

In the case of this first type, he or she should still be treated and nursed out of compassion and just in case there is a chance, no matter how slim, of recovery.

Of the seven articles in the Vejjavatapada, the first highlights the importance of care (hita), kindness (dayā) and compassion (anukampā) in the healing process.

The second concerns the physician's responsibility to be fully trained in and skilled in the administration of drugs, given that the physician's raison d'être is effective healing and that some medicines and surgical procedures can be potentially dangerous. According to Dhammika, this second article is equivalent to the Hippocratic Oath's third and fourth stipulation that the physician shall never do anything to harm a patient, even if asked to do so. It is the primum non nocere of Western medical ethics.

The fourth article counsels the physician to put their welfare above his or her personal gain.

The fifth article recognizes that at times it might be necessary to deal with the loathsome aspects of the human body and that the physician should do this with detachment, both for his or her own mental balance and so as not to embarrass the patient.

The sixth article recognizes the fact that spiritual counseling or comfort can have a part to play in healing and that the physician needs to have at least some abilities in this area. There are several discourses which describe the Buddha doing just this.

The seventh and final article requires the physician to minister to the patient even if all the signs indicate that he or she is not responding to the treatment and will probably die. Even a dying patient may need palliative care and made to be physically and mentally comfortable. In an interesting comparison to this, Suśruta, the father of Indian medicine, advises the physician not to treat a patient he suspects of being incurable so as not to be blamed for the patient's death and injure his reputation.

== See also ==
- Seventeen Rules of Enjuin
- Oath of Asaph
- Hippocratic Oath
- Jīvaka
