= Michael Stearns (artist) =

American artist

- Born: January 8, 1940; San Diego, California, US
- Education: California State University, Los Angeles
- Known for: Painting, sculpture
- Website: michaelstearnsstudio.com

Michael Stearns (born January 8, 1940) is an American abstract expressionist painter, sculptor and curator from California.

== Early life ==
Between 1964 and 1966, Stearns served in Vietnam and Japan as a photographer while on active duty in the U.S. Navy. Following his time in the service, he was a partner in a ceramics studio, Opus ll, where he taught ceramics as well as drawing and painting.

Stearns was a fire captain and paramedic with the Los Angeles County Fire Department from 1967 to 1988 and was a consultant on the television show Emergency!

== Career ==
In 2002 he opened Gallery 33 in Long Beach, California. It exhibited artists such as Lori LaMont, Todd Brainard, Richard Lopez, Elizabeth Washburn, Adam Normandin and Roderick Briggs. The gallery closed in 2008.

In 2012 Stearns moved his studio and gallery to San Pedro, California. His current gallery is Michael Stearns Studio 347 in the San Pedro arts district.

As a sculptor Stearns works with cardboard and newspaper as a way to bring nature and urban society together.

== Critical reviews ==
Stearns' work has been observed by art critic James Scarborough in Sculpture Magazine: "Michael Stearns creates acrylic paintings of great vibrancy. It's like watching neighborhood wildflowers that you have no idea are about to bloom and then, one fine day, the place runs amuck [sic] with color and fragrance and bees. His work is allusive and concrete, reverent like a meadow, a fragrance and a thing, a memory and a snapshot."
