= Ben Falk =

American basketball coach

Personal information
- Born: Potomac, Maryland

Career information
- High school: Charles E. Smith Jewish Day School
- College: University of Maryland

Career history
- 2018–2021: Jack M. Barrack Hebrew Academy

Ben Falk is an American former executive for the Portland Trail Blazers and Philadelphia 76ers of the National Basketball Association (NBA). He previously served as the boys' basketball coach at Jack M. Barrack Hebrew Academy in Bryn Mawr, Pennsylvania. Falk also runs a basketball website called Cleaning the Glass.

== Early life and education ==
Falk was born and raised in Potomac, Maryland. In high school, he developed a basketball fantasy game called XO Hoops in ninth grade while attending Charles E. Smith Jewish Day School. Falk did not play on his high school basketball team as he was told by his coach that he was only good enough to make the team as a benchwarmer. Falk attended the University of Maryland.

As a freshman in college, Falk worked as a summer intern for Dean Oliver, who served as the director of quantitative analysis for the Denver Nuggets.

== Career ==
In 2010, after graduating college, Falk was hired by the Portland Trail Blazers as their basketball analytics manager. He was in charge of creating internal scouting databases and managing statistics.

In 2014, Philadelphia 76ers general manager Sam Hinkie hired Falk as the team's vice president of basketball strategy, an executive role. After two years with the Sixers, Falk and the team mutually parted ways. This came following the departure of Hinkie.

Falk then served as a volunteer assistant coach at Jack M. Barrack Hebrew Academy from 2016 to 2017. In 2018, Falk was announced as Jack M. Barrack Hebrew Academy's boys' basketball head coach. He replaced Jeremy Treatman. Under Falk's leadership, Jack M. Barrack Hebrew Academy won their first Tri-County Independent School League Basketball Championship in 20 years. He left the team in 2021.
