= Virdimura =

Sicilian Jewish doctor

Virdimura (fl. 1376) was a Sicilian Jewish doctor, the first woman officially certified to practice medicine in Sicily.

== Biography ==
Though few biographical details of Virdimura are known, she was a Jewish woman living in Catania, Sicily, in the 14th century.

She was trained in the practice of Jewish medicine, perhaps by her husband, Pasquale de Medico of Catania, who was also thought to be a physician. It is not known if Pasquale was Jewish or not.

She obtained a royal license to practice medicine across the island of Sicily on November 7, 1376, with the approval of the doctors of King Frederick's royal court. Virdimura was asked to complete exams for the certification. Her patients also testified on her behalf, and the licensing documentation notes that the examiners took into consideration the "praise universally given her."

With this, she became the first woman physician with this designation on the island. She subsequently traveled throughout Sicily treating patients.

Virdimura particularly focused on treating poor and disabled patients, charging them less for her services than her male contemporaries. This also likely meant that she treated both female and male patients, and both Jews and gentiles.

== Legacy ==
The International Virdimura Award, which recognizes doctors with a humanitarian mission, is named for her.

A square in Catania, in the San Giovanni Galermo district, was also named in her honor in 2020.

In 2024, a biography of the doctor, titled Virdimura, was published by the Syracusean writer Lo Iacono Simona.
