= Jonathan Hoffman =

American investment banker and bond trader

Jonathan K. Hoffman
- Born: October 17, 1972 (age 53); Philadelphia, Pennsylvania, U.S.
- Education: University of Pennsylvania

Jonathan Hoffman (born October 17, 1972) is an American investment banker and bond trader. Hoffman has worked as a high-profile trader for both Lehman Brothers and Barclays.

== Early life and education ==
Hoffman was born and raised in Philadelphia, Pennsylvania. His family owned and ran a candy business, Frankford Candy, which is one of the largest manufacturers of chocolate rabbits in the United States. He is the youngest of five children.

Hoffman graduated from Jack M. Barrack Hebrew Academy in 1990 and the University of Pennsylvania in 1994. He expected to attend the Wharton School of Business for his M.B.A, but instead took a job at Lehman Brothers.

== Career ==
Hoffman began working on Wall Street, at Lehman Brothers, in 1994. He expected to eventually enter his family's candy business, but soon became successful in trading government bonds.

He describes his trading strategy as having "quite a bit of gut in it" because he pays little attention to factors including economic growth rates and monetary policies.

In 2001, Hoffman moved to Palm Beach, Florida and began to work out of Lehman Brother's Miami office. From 2005 to 2008, Hoffman earned more than $140 million in bonuses and in 2008 became the firm's highest paid employee. He served as the Head of Global Rates at Lehman Brothers.

Following Lehman Brother's bankruptcy in 2008, Hoffman worked at Barclay's from 2009 to 2013. He brought in more $1.1 billion during his time there, but left following greater federal regulations of the stock market.

After leaving Barclay's, he took time off for two years before beginning to trade stocks from his home.

Since 2017, Hoffman has worked for ExodusPoint, a hedge fund.

== Personal life ==
Hoffman currently lives in Wynnewood, Pennsylvania with his wife, Dr. Meredith Hoffman, and three children.

In 2016, Hoffman sued the estate of Lehman Brothers seeking $83 million in unpaid bonuses. Lehman Brothers was originally ordered to pay Hoffman $7.7 million, but U.S. District Judge Lorna Schofield later overruled that verdict, which was later reinstated by the Second Circuit Court of Appeals.
