= Beatrice Winn Berlin =

American painter, printmaker (1922–1999)

- Born: Beatrice Winn; May 27, 1922; Philadelphia, Pennsylvania, U.S.
- Died: August 11, 1999; California, U.S.
- Other names: Beatrice Wynn, Beatrice Berlin
- Education: Moore College of Art, Fleisher Art Memorial, Philadelphia Colleges of the Arts, Pennsylvania Museum and School of Industrial Art
- Occupation(s): Printmaker, painter, teacher
- Movement: Modernism
- Spouse(s): Herbert Edward Berlin (m. 1945–), Warren Joseph Sturmer (m. 1971–)
- Children: 2

Beatrice Winn Berlin (née Beatrice Winn; May 27, 1922 – August 11, 1999) was an American printmaker, painter, and teacher.

== Early life and education ==
Beatrice Winn Berlin was born as Beatrice Winn on May 27, 1922, in Philadelphia, Pennsylvania, to parents Pauline (née Neubauer) and Benjamin Winn.

She attended Moore College of Art and Design, Fleischer Art Memorial, and Philadelphia Colleges of the Arts (now University of the Arts, Philadelphia), and was a student under Samuel Maitin, Victor Lasuchin, Hitoshi Nakazato, and Kenjilo Nanao.

In 1945, she married Herbert Edward Berlin, and paused her arts education to raise their two daughters. In 1963, Berlin enrolled in an introduction to printmaking course at Pennsylvania Museum and School of Industrial Art, which inspired her to pursue further courses in printmaking.

== Career ==
She found inspiration in collagraphy, and Japanese modernism. In the late 1960s, Berlin began teaching drawing, painting, and printmaking at various community colleges in New Jersey and Pennsylvania.

She married Warren Joseph Sturmer in 1971. In 1976 she moved to the San Francisco Bay Area, opened an art studio in Martinez, California. She taught printmaking at Judah L. Magnes Museum (now Magnes Collection of Jewish Art and Life) at the University of California, Berkeley. By 1980, Berlin shifted her focus away from collagraphy and towards intaglio.

Berlin was a member of the Philadelphia Watercolor Club, the Philadelphia Print Club, the American Color Print Society, and the California Society of Printmakers. Her work is in museum collections, including at the Philadelphia Museum of Art, Fine Arts Museums of San Francisco, and the Brooklyn Museum.

She died on August 11, 1999, in California.
