= Magilla =

Magilla may refer to:

- Magilla Gorilla, a Hanna-Barbera cartoon character
- The Magilla Gorilla Show, a Hanna-Barbera cartoon featuring the character
- Magilla (comics), a Marvel Comics character

== See also ==
- Megillah (disambiguation)
