= Leonard Barrack =

American lawyer (born 1943)

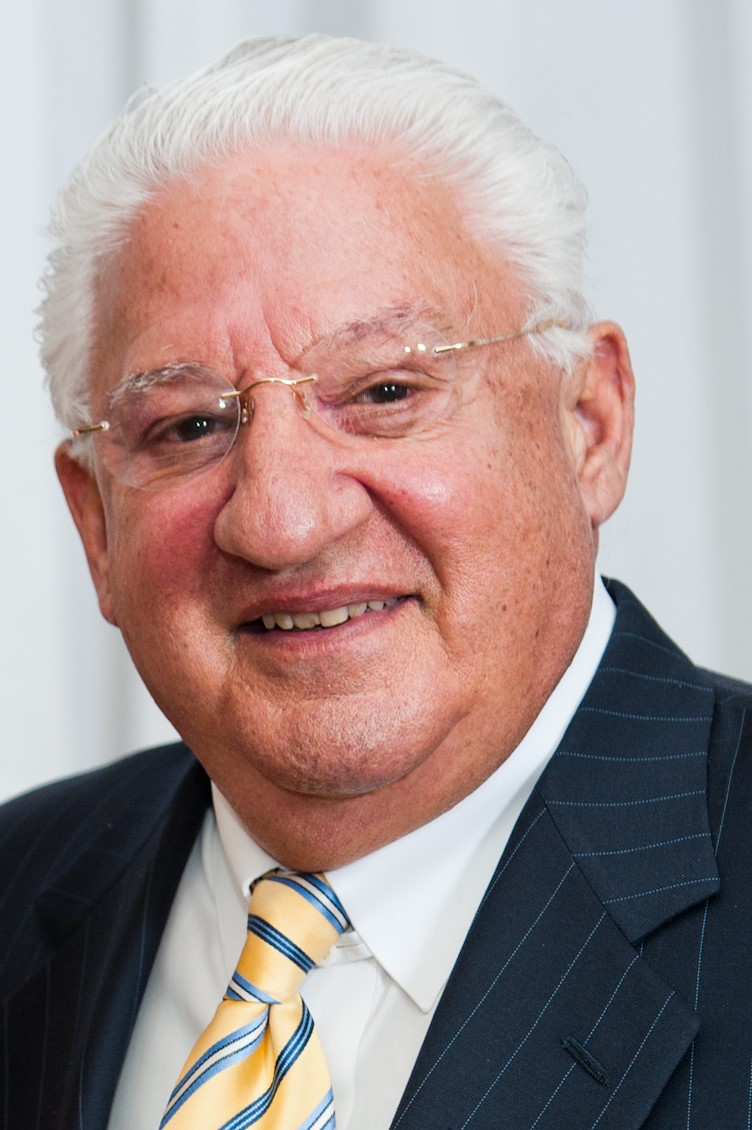

National Finance Chairman of the Democratic National Committee
- In office 1998–2004

Personal details
- Born: June 8, 1943 (age 83) Philadelphia, Pennsylvania, U.S.
- Party: Democratic
- Children: 5
- Education: Emory University; Temple University (BA, JD)

Leonard Barrack (born June 8, 1943) is an American lawyer and entrepreneur. He is a co-founder and partner of the law firm Barrack, Rodos & Bacine. As a partner, he won the case against Worldcom.

== Early life and education ==
Born in Philadelphia in 1943 to parents who emigrated to the United States in 1923. Later, he attended the Temple University, where he completed his undergraduate degree.

Barrack attended Akiba Hebrew Academy for high school and then studied at Emory University. During his first semester, tragedy struck the Barrack family; Leonard’s father and elder brother, Jack, were killed in a plane crash. This prompted Leonard to return to Philadelphia and transfer to Temple University where he completed his undergraduate degree.

Following college graduation, Barrack enrolled in the Temple University School of Law (now the Temple University Beasley School of Law), where he earned his Juris Doctor and served as Editor in Chief of the Temple Law Reporter. He graduated from law school in 1968 and began an illustrious legal career.

== Career ==
Barrack began his legal career as a law clerk for the Delaware Court of Chancery. He was admitted to the bar of the Supreme Court of Pennsylvania in 1969, and maintains his membership on the bars of the United States Supreme Court, the United States Courts of Appeals for the First, Third, Eighth and Tenth Circuits, and the United States District Court for the Eastern District of Pennsylvania.

In 1976, Barrack became the senior and founding partner of Barrack, Rodos & Bacine, which litigates securities and antitrust class actions and complex commercial litigation.

Barrack served as the National Finance Chairman of the Democratic National Committee from 1998 until 2004. Previously, he has served as vice chairman of the American Israel Public Affairs Committee.

== Philanthropy ==
In 2001, Barrack joined the Temple University's board of trustees and now chairs its law school's board of visitors.

In September 2008, Barrack became the president of the Jewish Federation of Greater Philadelphia.

He was awarded by Temple University awarded with the Alumni Distinguished Service Award in 2010. Two years later, Barrack received the Communal Leadership Award from the Jewish Federation of Greater Philadelphia.

In June 2016, Barrack and his wife donated $5 million to establish a scholarship at the Temple University Beasley School of Law. He is also the founder of Barrack Foundation which donated $5 million to Akiba Hebrew Academy which later renamed after his brother, Jack M. Barrack.

Barrack and his wife established a fund to establish Perelman-Barrack Bridge in 2017.

== Personal life ==
He is married to Lynne Barrack and together they have five children and eleven grandchildren. He is of Jewish descent.
