= Michael Stearns (disambiguation) =

Michael Stearns is a musician and composer.

Michael Stearns may also refer to:

- Mike Stearns, 1632 series character
- Michael Stearns (artist) (born 1940), American painter, sculptor and curator
