= Shamir Medical Center =

Coordinates: 31°57′59.76″N 34°50′23.21″E

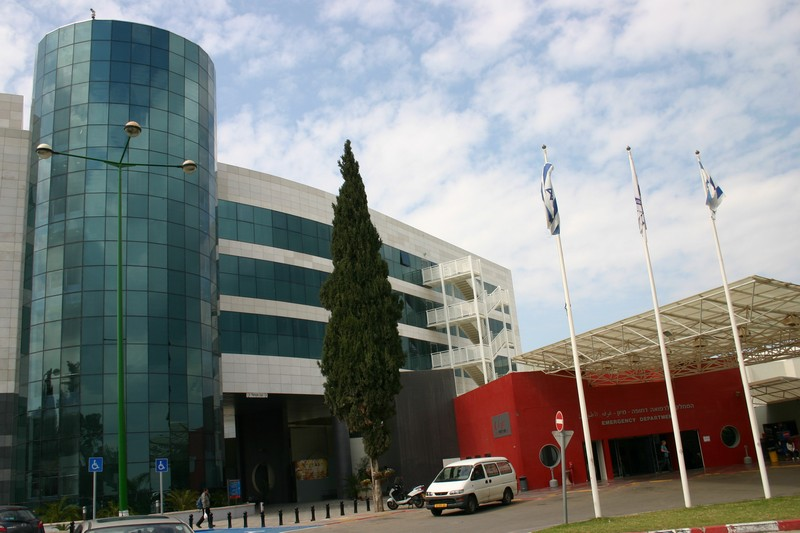

Geography
- Location: Be'er Ya'akov, Israel

Organisation
- Type: Teaching
- Affiliated university: Tel Aviv University Faculty of Medicine

Services
- Beds: 891

History
- Founded: 1918

Links
- Website: www.shamir.org
- Lists: Hospitals in Israel

Shamir Medical Center, formerly Assaf Harofeh Medical Center, is a teaching hospital in Be'er Ya'akov, 15 kilometres (9.3 mi) southeast of Tel Aviv, Israel.

== History ==
The Medical Center was named after Asaph the Jew, author of the Oath of Asaph and an early medical text. The facility was established in 1918 as a military hospital of the British Army in the closing days of the First World War. It was located adjacent to the sprawling British military base in Tzrifin (Sarafand). After the creation of the State of Israel, it was converted to an Israeli hospital.

The hospital was renamed after the former Israeli prime minister Yitzhak Shamir in April 2017.

== Services ==
It is one of Israel's largest hospitals, with over 800 beds. It serves over 370,000 people in Israel's Central District. As a teaching facility, the hospital is part of the Sackler Faculty of Medicine of Tel Aviv University. On its grounds are the first and largest Israeli academic nursing school and the oldest Israeli school of physiotherapy.
