= Seventeen Rules of Enjuin =

The Seventeen Rules of Enjuin (延寿院医則十七ヶ条) are a code of conduct developed for students of the Japanese Ri-shu school of medicine in the 16th century CE. They contain the same number of precepts as the Seventeen-article constitution of Prince Shōtoku.

The rules are similar to the Vejjavatapada, the Buddhist medical doctor's oath, the Oath of Asaph and the Hippocratic Oath, in that they stress the rights of the physicians' teachers, require the physician to respect the patient's privacy rights, and prohibit both euthanasia and abortion. They also emphasize that physicians should love their patients and that they should work together as a brotherhood.

== The Seventeen Rules ==
1. Each person should follow the path designated by Heaven (Buddha, the Gods).
2. You should always be kind to people. You should always be devoted to loving people.
3. The teaching of Medicine should be restricted to selected persons.
4. You should not tell others what you are taught, regarding treatments without permission.
5. You should not establish association with doctors who do not belong to this school.
6. All the successors and descendants of the disciples of this school shall follow the teachers' ways.
7. If any disciples cease the practice of Medicine, or, if successors are not found at the death of the disciple, all the medical books of this school should be returned to the School of Enjuin.
8. You should not kill living creatures, nor should you admire hunting or fishing.
9. In our school, teaching about poisons is prohibited, nor should you receive instructions about poisons from other physicians. Moreover, you should not give abortives to the people.
10. You should rescue even such patients as you dislike or hate. You should do virtuous acts, but in such a way that they do not become known to people. To do good deeds secretly is a mark of virtue.
11. You should not exhibit avarice and you must not strain to become famous. You should not rebuke or reprove a patient, even if he does not present you with money or goods in gratitude.
12. You should be delighted if, after treating a patient without success, the patient receives medicine from another physician, and is cured.
13. You should not speak ill of other physicians.
14. You should not tell what you have learned from the time you enter a woman's room, and, moreover, you should not have obscene or immoral feelings when examining a woman.
15. Proper or not, you should not tell others what you have learned in lectures, or what you have learned about prescribing medicine.
16. You should not like undue extravagance. If you like such living, your avarice will increase, and you will lose the ability to be kind to others.
17. If you do not keep the rules and regulations of this school, then you will be cancelled as a disciple. In more severe cases, the punishment will be greater.

== See also ==
- Vejjavatapada
- Oath of Asaph
- Sun Simiao
