= Pennsylvania Museum and School of Industrial Art =

School in Philadelphia, Pennsylvania, US

Coordinates: 39.946°N 75.166°W

The Pennsylvania Museum and School of Industrial Art (PMSIA), also referred to as the School of Applied Art, was a museum and teaching institution which later split into the Philadelphia Museum of Art and University of the Arts. It was chartered by the Commonwealth of Pennsylvania on February 26, 1876, in response to the Centennial International Exhibition held in Philadelphia that year. The intention was to train students to improve the designs of manufactured products.

== History and notable features ==
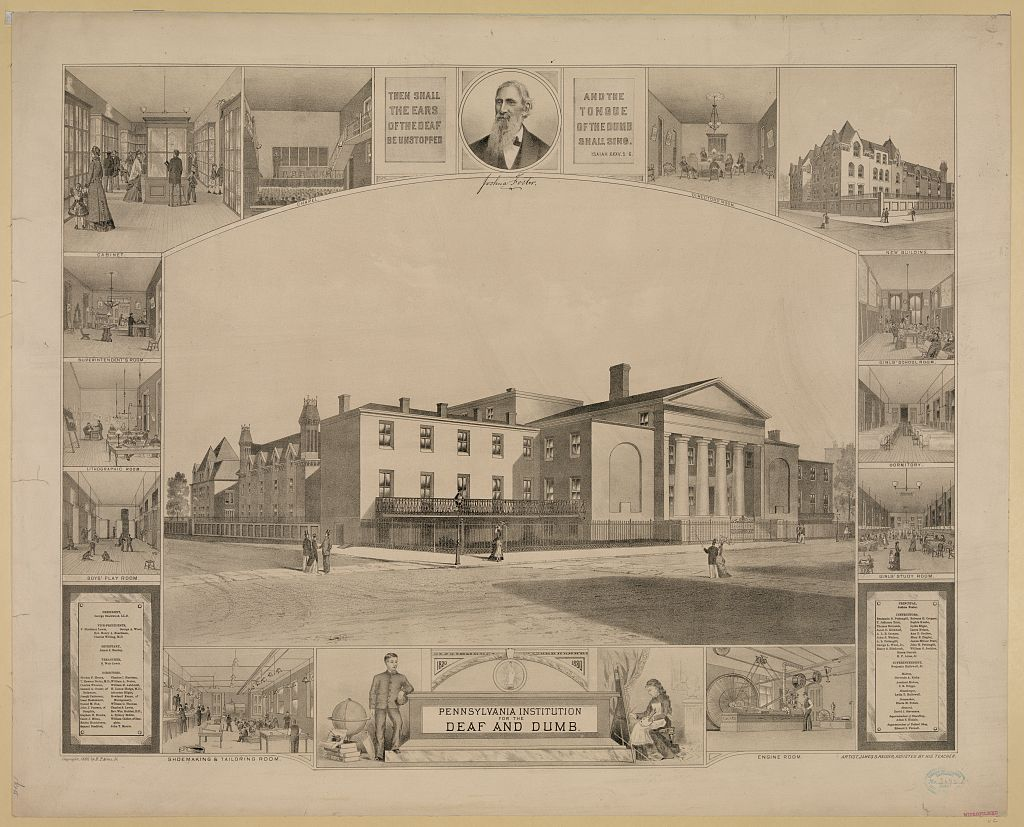
Pennsylvania Institution for the Deaf and Dumb; later Hamilton Hall, University of the Arts.

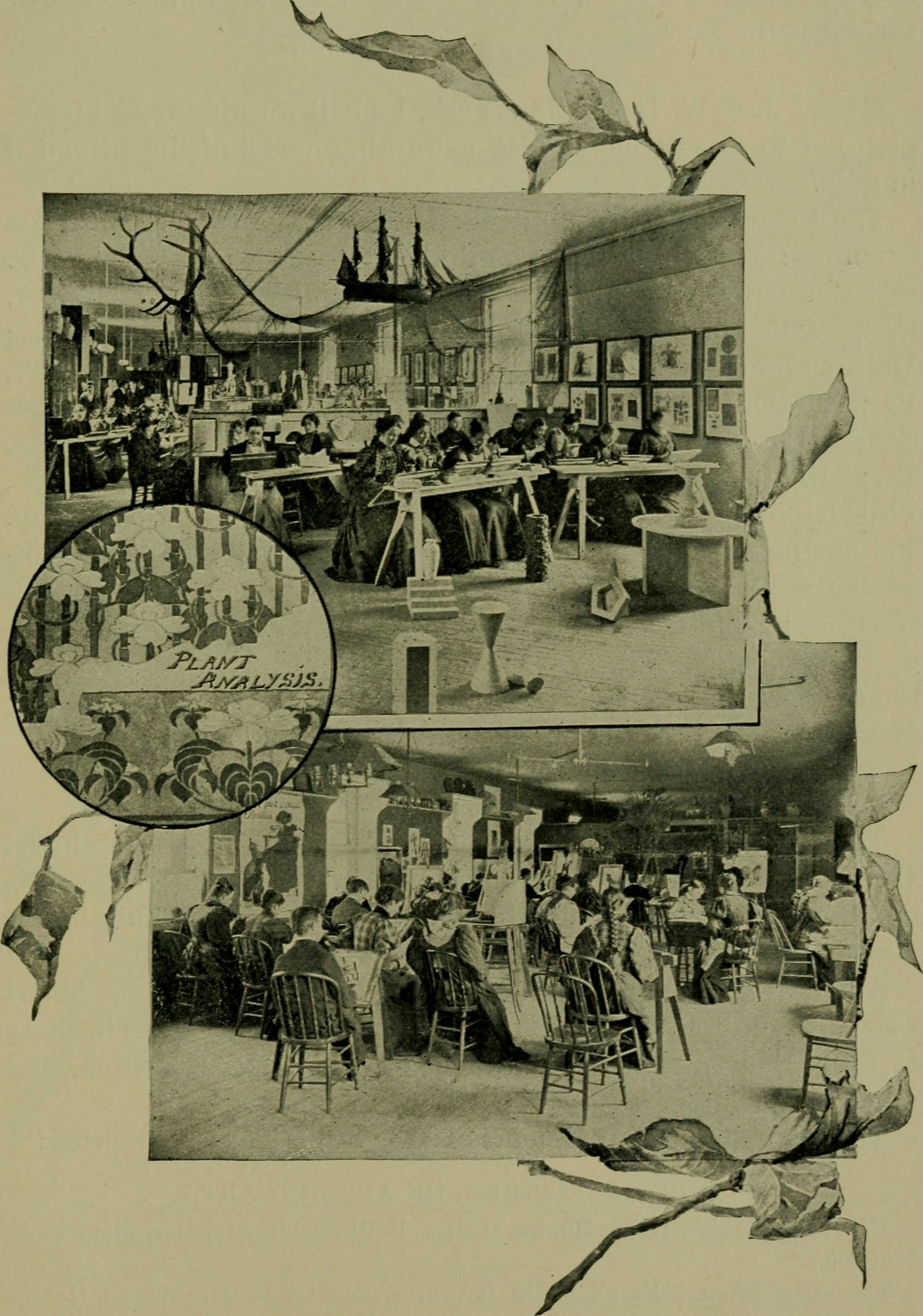
Art classrooms, circa 1891

Classes began during the fall of 1877 and were held in a building at 312 North Broad Street. Shortly thereafter, classes were moved into the old Franklin Institute at 15 South 7th Street. From 1879 to 1884 the school was located at 1709 Chestnut Street, then at 1336 Spring Garden Street from 1884 to 1893.

In 1893, PMSIA acquired a complex of buildings at Broad & Pine, vacated by the Pennsylvania Institution for the Deaf and Dumb when they moved to Germantown.

In 1964, following a series of name changes, the museum and the school separated: the museum became the Philadelphia Museum of Art, and the school became the Philadelphia College of Art. After further name changes, the school became the University of the Arts. The University of the Arts had retained the property at 320 S. Broad Street, called Hamilton Hall.

== Notable people ==
The first president of PMSIA was Coleman Sellers II (1827–1907). The first principal of the school was Leslie W. Miller (1848–1931), who remained there for forty years, from 1880 through 1920.

Notable alumni include Samuel Joseph Brown Jr., Paul Hadley, Meta Vaux Warrick Fuller, Charles Sheeler, Katherine Levin Farrell, Beatrice Fenton, Allan Randall Freelon, Samuel Yellin, Mordechai Rosenstein, Irving Penn, the Brothers Quay, Henry Clarence Pitz, Jerry Pinkney, Jayson Musson, Paul F. Keene Jr., Harold Knerr, Norman Carton, Wharton Esherick, Frederick Meyer, Beatrice Winn Berlin, Julian Abele, Aliki Brandenberg, Charles Barton Keen and Samuel Maitin.
