= Megillah =

Megillah (Hebrew: מגילה, scroll) may refer to:

== Bible ==
- The Book of Esther (Megillat Esther), read on the Jewish holiday of Purim
- The Five Megillot
- Megillat Antiochus

== Rabbinic literature ==
- Tractate Megillah in the Talmud.
- Megillat Taanit, a tannaitic document listing Jewish days of celebration.

== Other ==
- The Megillah, a musical by Itzik Manger in the style of Purim spiel
- List of English words of Yiddish origin#Megillah, colloquially, a tediously detailed discourse

== See also ==
- Magilla (disambiguation)
