= Adam Normandin =

American painter

- Born: Hempstead, New York
- Education: BA, Hofstra University
- Known for: Contemporary realist painting

Adam Normandin is a contemporary realist painter living and working in Los Angeles. Generally, Normandin's paintings depict freight train cars that are sometimes covered in graffiti, in desolate settings, and are either in motion or standing idle and still. As a realist painter, his detailed paintings are an accurate document of freight train cars and railways.

Normandin's paintings are an exploration of the interconnectedness and transience of humanity. His paintings were included in the 'Contemporary Realism Biennial' at the Fort Wayne Museum of Art in 2014.

== Collections ==
Several of Normandin's paintings are in the collection of, and on view at, the Seven Bridges Foundation in Greenwich, CT.
