= Michael Stern (zoologist) =

American zookeeper, conservationist, anthropologist and primatologist

- Born: 1978; Philadelphia
- Education: Harvard University (BS)
- Occupations: Anthropologist conservationist primatologist zookeeper zoologist
- Years active: 2000-present
- Spouse: Rebecca Goldstone (2005–present)
- Website: www.newnaturefoundation.org

Michael Stern (born 1978) is an American zookeeper, conservationist, anthropologist and primatologist currently works at African Wildlife Foundation and previously served as the Curator of Primates and Small Mammals at Philadelphia Zoo and is the co-founder of the New Nature Foundation. He previously worked at the Denver Zoo and Honolulu Zoo.

== Early life ==
Stern was born in the Philadelphia area and attended Jack M. Barrack Hebrew Academy, then known as Akiba Hebrew Academy, graduating in 1996. He went on to attend Harvard University and graduated in 2001 with a degree in biological anthropology. At Harvard, he was mentored by noted primatologist and researcher, Richard Wrangham.

Starting at age 12, Stern began volunteering at the Philadelphia Zoo nearly every Saturday. At age 13, he became a presenter in the children's zoo. He eventually reached a point where many of the animals knew who he was and was among the first people to meet the zoo's baby orangutan.

== Career ==
Prior to founding the New Nature Foundation together, Stern and Goldstone did primate behavior research in Africa starting in 2000. Their research discovered why red colobus monkeys are a favorite prey of chimpanzees. He continues to visit Africa for 4 to 6 weeks every year and is a lecturer on his work.

Stern and Rebecca Goldstone founded the New Nature Foundation in 2008. The foundation works with local citizens to protect wildlife habitat in Uganda and Vietnam. Stern and Goldstone's foundation has worked to plant trees, produce fuel using agriculture waste and build five community science centers around Kibale National Park. Harvard awarded Stern with the Sheldon Traveling Fellowship to partner with local primary schools to bring Ugandan students on field trips to the park. Stern also served as a consultant on efficient stoves to save the tonkin snub-nosed monkey in Vietnam.

From 2011 to 2016, Stern served as the Primate Area Supervisor and Assistant Curator of Primates at the Denver Zoo. There he was tasked with working with the Species Survival Plan to help breed western lowland gorillas. There he also created an arboreal feeder for orangutans that was shared with the Association of Zoos & Aquariums.

Stern spent time in 2016 and 2017 at the Honolulu Zoo as the zoo's General Curator.

In 2017, Stern returned to the Philadelphia Zoo in the role of Curator of Primates and Small Mammals. In that position, he serves as a member of the gibbons Species Survival Plan Management Board and leads the zoos international conservation efforts of the Rodrigues fruit bat. He designed the $100,000 treehouse for the zoo's gorillas. He has provided commentary on the zoo's animals to sources such as National Geographic, CBS This Morning and KYW News Radio.

== Personal life ==
Stern is Jewish and embraces his Jewish culture, history and Tikkun Olam in his work. Stern was featured in a short film titled "The Zoo Changes You." The film was nominated for a Shorty Award.
