= Steven Goldman (scientist) =

American neurologist

Steven A. Goldman is an American physician-scientist. His research focuses on the use of stem and progenitor cells for the treatment of neurodegenerative disorders such as Huntington's Disease, as well as for the treatment of glial diseases such as the pediatric leukodystrophies and multiple sclerosis.

Goldman serves as Professor of Neuroscience and Neurology at the University of Rochester and holds a dual appointment at the University of Copenhagen. At both institutions, he serves as a co-director for the Centers of Basic and Translational Neuroscience. Goldman is a graduate of the University of Pennsylvania, with degrees in both Biology and Psychology. He obtained his PhD with Fernando Nottebohm at the Rockefeller University in 1983, and his Medical Degree from Cornell University in 1984. Goldman has authored over 250 scientific articles.

Goldman is the founder of Oscine Therapeutics, a biotechnology company for creating and delivering engineered cells to patients. Goldman is the Senior VP, Head of CNS Therapy for Sana Biotechnology.

== Publications ==
His most cited publications are:

- Iliff JJ, Wang M, Liao Y, Plogg BA, Peng W, Gundersen GA, Benveniste H, Vates GE, Deane R, Goldman SA, Nagelhus EA. A paravascular pathway facilitates CSF flow through the brain parenchyma and the clearance of interstitial solutes, including amyloid β. Science translational medicine. 2012 Aug 15;4(147):147ra111-. (open access) (Cited 2863 times, according to Google Scholar.
- Nedergaard M, Ransom B, Goldman SA. New roles for astrocytes: redefining the functional architecture of the brain. Trends in neurosciences. 2003 Oct 1;26(10):523-30. (Cited 1544 times, according to Google Scholar.)
- Goldman SA, Nottebohm F. Neuronal production, migration, and differentiation in a vocal control nucleus of the adult female canary brain. Proceedings of the National Academy of Sciences. 1983 Apr 1;80(8):2390-4. (open access) (Cited 1280 times, according to Google Scholar.)
- Oberheim NA, Takano T, Han X, He W, Lin JH, Wang F, Xu Q, Wyatt JD, Pilcher W, Ojemann JG, Ransom BR. Uniquely hominid features of adult human astrocytes. Journal of Neuroscience. 2009 Mar 11;29(10):3276-87. ( (open access) Cited 1082 times, according to Google Scholar.)
