= Oath of Maimonides =

Oath taken by pharmacists and physicians

The Oath of Maimonides is a traditional oath for pharmacists and physicians attributed to Maimonides (pronounced [/maɪˈmɑnɪdiːz/]; born Moshe ben-Maimon, מֹשֶׁה בֶּן־מַיְמוֹן), a 12-century rabbi, physician, and Jewish philosopher. It should not be confused with the more lengthy and pseudonymous "Prayer of Maimonides". It is widely used as the traditional oath taken by pharmacists, analogous to the Hippocratic Oath for physicians, and is also used as an alternative.

== The oath ==
The eternal providence has appointed me to watch over the life and health of Thy creatures. May the love for my art actuate me at all times; may neither avarice nor miserliness, nor thirst for glory or for a great reputation engage my mind; for the enemies of truth and philanthropy could easily deceive me and make me forgetful of my lofty aim of doing good to Thy children.

May I never see in the patient anything but a fellow creature in pain.

Grant me the strength, time and opportunity always to correct what I have acquired, always to extend its domain; for knowledge is immense and the spirit of man can extend indefinitely to enrich itself daily with new requirements. Today he can discover his errors of yesterday and tomorrow he can obtain a new light on what he thinks himself sure of today.

Oh, God, Thou has appointed me to watch over the life and death of Thy creatures; here am I ready for my vocation and now I turn unto my calling.

== History and authorship ==
The prayer and oath were first published in 1783 by German-Jewish physician Markus Herz. While Herz described it as a translation from an original Hebrew text by Maimonides, scholarship by Fred Rosner, a physician and historian of medicine, suggests that the text was actually Herz's own. In 1790, a Hebrew version by Isaac Abraham Euchel appeared in the journal Me'assefim; it attributed the original text to Herz.

== See also ==
- Charaka shapath
- Hippocratic Oath
- Declaration of Geneva
- Prayer of Maimonides
