= Charaka shapath =

Passage of text in the Charaka Samhita

Charaka shapath (or, Charaka oath) is a certain passage of text in Charaka Samhita, a Sanskrit text on Ayurveda (Indian traditional medicine) believed to have been composed between 100 BCE and 200 CE. The passage referred to as Charaka Shapath is written in the form a set of instructions by a teacher to prospective students of the science of medicine. According to Charaka Samhita, the unconditional agreement to abide by these instructions is a necessary precondition to be eligible to be taught in the science of medicine. The passage gives explicit instructions on the necessity of practicing asceticism during student life, student-teacher relationship, the importance of committing oneself fully and completely for the well-being of the patient, whom to treat, how to behave with women, and several other related issues. The passage appears as paragraphs 13–14 in Chapter 8 of the Vimanasthana (the third Sthana) in Charaka Samhita.

== Charaka Shapath: Text in Devanagari with English translation ==
The original text of Charaka Shapath in the Sanskrit language in the Devanagari script along with an English translation of the same is reproduced below. The text and translation are taken mostly from Charaka Samhita, Shree Galabkuverba Ayurveic Society, Jamnagar India, 1947, Volume II, pp. 865–871. The original Sanskrit version is also available as an ebook in the portal of the National Institute of Indian Medical Heritage, Hyderabad.

Charaka Shapath: Text in Devanagari with English translation
Original text in Devanagari	English translation
अथैनमग्निसकाशे ब्राह्मणसकाशे भिषक्सकाशे चानुशिष्यात् -	The teacher then should instruct the disciple in the presence of the sacred fire, brahmanas and physicians -
ब्रह्मचारिणा श्मश्रुधारिण सत्यवादिनाऽमांसादेन मेध्यसेविना निर्मत्सरेणाशस्त्रधारिणा च भवितव्यं, न च ते मद्वचनात् किञ्चिदकार्यं स्यादन्यत्र राजद्विष्टात् प्राणहराद्विपुलादधर्म्यादनर्थसम्प्रयुक्ताद्वाऽप्यर्थात्;	(saying) "Thou shalt lead the life of a bachelor (Brahmachari), grow thy hair and beard, speak only the truth, eat no meat, eat only pure articles of food, be free from envy and carry no arms. There shall be nothing that thou oughtest not do at my behest except hating the king or causing another's death or committing an act of great unrighteousness or acts leading to calamity.
मदर्पणेन मत्प्रधानेन मदधीनेन मत्प्रियहितानुवर्तिना च शश्वद्भवितव्यं, पुत्रवद्दासवदर्थिवच्चोपचरताऽनुवस्तव्योऽहम्,अनुत्सेकेनावहितेनानन्यमनसा विनीतेनावेक्ष्यावेक्ष्यकारिणाऽनसूयकेन चाभ्यनुज्ञातेन प्रविचरितव्यम्, अनुज्ञातेन (चाननुज्ञातेन च) प्रविचरता पूर्वं गुर्वर्थोपाहरणे यथाशक्ति प्रयतितव्यं;	Thou shall dedicate thyself to me and regard me as thy chief. Thou shalt be subject to me and conduct thyself for ever for my welfare and pleasure. Thou shalt serve and dwell with me like a son or a slave or a supplicant. Thou shalt behave and act without arrogance and with care and attention, and with undistracted mind, humility, constant reflection, and with ungrudging obedience. Acting either at my behest or otherwise, thou shalt conduct thyself for the achievement of thy teacher's purpose alone to the best of thy abilities.
कर्मसिद्धिमर्थसिद्धं यशोलाभं प्रेत्य च स्वर्गमिच्छता भिषजा त्वया गोब्राह्मणमादौ कृत्वा सर्वप्राणभृतां शर्माशासितव्यमहरहरुत्तिष्ठता चोपविशता च,	If thou desirest success, wealth and fame as a physician and heaven after death, thou shalt pray for the welfare of all creatures beginning with the cows and brahmanas.
सर्वात्मना चातुराणामारोग्याय प्रयतितव्यं, जीवितहेतोरपि चातुरेभ्यो नाभिद्रोग्धव्यं, मनसाऽपि च परस्त्रियो नाभिगमनीयास्तथा सर्वमेव परस्वं, निभृतवेशपरिच्छदेन भवितव्यम्, अशौण्डेनापापेनापापसहायेन च, श्लक्ष्णशुक्लधर्म्यशर्म्यधन्यसत्यहितमितवचसा देशकालविचारिणा स्मृतिमता ज्ञानोत्थानोपकरणसम्पत्सु नित्यं यत्नवता च;	Day and night, however thou mayest be engaged, thou shalt endeavour for the relief of patients with all thy heart and soul. Thou shalt not desert or injure thy patient even for the sake of thy life or thy living. Thou shalt not commit adultery even in thought. Even so, thou shalt not covet other's possessions. Thou shalt be modest in thy attire and appearance. Thou shouldst not be a drunkard or a sinful man nor shouldst thou associate with the abettors of crimes. Thou shouldst speak words that are gentle, pure and righteous, pleasing, worthy, true, wholesome and moderate. Thy behaviour must be in consideration of time and place and heedful of past experience. Thou shalt act always with a view to the acquisition of knowledge and the fullness of equipment.
न च कदाचिद्राजद्विष्टानां राजद्वेषिणां वा महाजनद्विष्टानां महाजनद्वेषिणां वाऽप्यौषधमनुविधातव्यं, तथा सर्वेषामत्यर्थविकृतदुष्टदुःखशीलाचारोपचाराणामनपवादप्रतिकारणां [२] मुमूर्षूणां च, तथैवासन्निहितेश्वराणां स्त्रीणामनध्यक्षाणां वा;	No persons, who are hated of the king, or who are haters of the king or who are hated of the public, shall receive treatment. Similarly, those that are very unnatural, wicked and miserable character and conduct, those who have not vindicated their honour and those that are on the point of death and similarly women who are unattended by their husbands or guardians shall not receive treatment.
न च कदाचित् स्त्रीदत्तमामिषमादातव्यमननुज्ञातं भर्त्राऽथवाऽध्यक्षेण, आतुरकुलं चानुप्रविशता विदितेनानुमतप्रवेशिना सार्धं पुरुषेण सुसंवीतेनावाक्शिरसा स्मृतिमता स्तिमितेनावेक्ष्यावेक्ष्य मनसा सर्वमाचरता सम्यगनुप्रवेष्टव्यम्, अनुप्रविश्य च वाङ्मनोबुद्धीन्द्रियाणि न क्वचित् प्रणिधातव्यान्यन्यत्रातुरादातुरोपकारार्थादातुरगतेष्वन्येषु वा भावेषु, न चातुरकुलप्रवृत्तयो बहिर्निश्चारयितव्याः, ह्रसितं चायुषः प्रमाणमातुरस्य जानताऽपि त्वया न वर्णयितव्यं तत्र यत्रोच्यमानमातुरस्यान्यस्य वाऽप्युपघाताय सम्पद्यते;	No offering of meat by a woman without the behest of her husband or guardian shall be accepted by thee. While entering the patient's house, thou shalt be accompanied by a man who is known to the patient and who has his permission to enter and thou shalt be well-clad and bent of head, self-possessed, and conduct thyself after repeated consideration. Thou shalt thus properly make thy entry. Having entered, thy speech, mind, intellect and senses shall be entirely devoted to no other thought than that of being helpful to the patient and things concerning him only. The peculiar customs of the patient's household shall not be made public. Even knowing that the patient's span of life has come to a close, it shall not be mentioned by thee there where if so done it would cause shock to the patient or to others,
ज्ञानवताऽपि च नात्यर्थमात्मनो ज्ञाने विकत्थितव्यम्, आप्तादपि हि विकत्थमानादत्यर्थमुद्विजन्त्यनेके.	Though of knowledge one should not boast very much of one's knowledge. Most people are offended by boastfulness of even those who are otherwise good and authoritative.
न चैव ह्यस्ति सुतरमायुर्वेदस्य पारं, तस्मादप्रमत्तः शश्वदभियोगमस्मिन् गच्छेत्, एतच्च [३] कार्यम्, एवम्भूयश्च वृत्तसौष्ठवमनसूयता परेभ्योऽप्यागमयितव्यं, कृत्स्नो हि लोको बुद्धिमतामाचार्यः शत्रुश्चाबुद्धिमताम्, अतश्चाभिसमीक्ष्य बुद्धिमताऽमित्रस्यापि धन्यं यशस्यमायुष्यं पौष्टिकं लौक्यमभ्युपदिशतो [४] वचः श्रोतव्यमनुविधातव्यं चेति.	There is no limit at all to the "Science of Life". So, thou shouldst apply thyself to it with diligence. This is how thou shouldst act. Again thou shouldst learn the skill of practice from another without carping. The entire world is a teacher to the intelligent and the foe to the unintelligent. Hence, knowing this well, thou shouldst listen and act according to the words of instruction of even an unfriendly person, when they are worthy and such as bring fame to you and long life, and are capable of giving you strength and prosperity."
अतः परमिदं ब्रूयात्- देवताग्निद्विजगुरुवृद्धसिद्धाचार्येषु ते नित्यं सम्यग्वर्तितव्यं, तेषु ते सम्यग्वर्तमानस्यायमग्निः सर्वगन्धरसरत्नबीजानि यथेरिताश्च देवताः शिवाय स्युः, अतोऽन्यथा वर्तमानस्याशिवायेति.	Thereafter the teacher should say this - "Thou shouldst conduct properly with gods, the sacred fire, the twice-born, the guru, the aged, the adepts and the preceptors. If thou hast conducted thyself well with them, the fire, the fragrances, the tastes, the precious stones, the grains and the gods become well disposed towards thee. If thou shouldst conduct thyself otherwise, they become unfavourable to thee."
एवं ब्रुवति चाचार्ये शिष्यः ‘तथा’ इति ब्रूयात्. यथोपदेशं च कुर्वन्नध्याप्यः, अतोऽन्यथा त्वनध्याप्यः. अध्याप्यमध्यापयन् ह्याचार्यो यथोक्तैश्चाध्यापनफलैर्योगमाप्नोत्यन्यैश्चानुक्तैः श्रेयस्करैर्गुणैः शिष्यमात्मानं च युनक्ति. इत्यध्यापनविधिरुक्तः.	To the teacher that has thus spoken, the disciple should say "Even so". If he behaves as instructed, he deserves to be taught, else, he does not deserve to be taught. The teacher who teaches the worthy disciples will obtain all the auspicious fruits of teaching, those described and even others not described here and obtains all auspicious qualities for himself as well as for his disciples. Thus has been described the method of instruction.

== Charaka oath to replace Hippocratic oath in Medical Colleges in India ==
In a discussion meeting with the authorities of all medical colleges in India, the National Medical Commission of India presented a proposal to replace the Hippocratic Oath with the "Maharshi Charaka Shapath" while conducting the white coat ceremony with parents in medical colleges. However, several medical practitioners individually and collectively have protested against the proposal.

== Additional reading ==
- Meharban Singh (1997). "Oaths, codes, ethics and the essence of medicine: A time for resurrection" (PDF). The National Medical Journal of India. 10 (4): 190–193. PMID 9325646.
- Shaan Bhandarkar (21 November 2020). "The Hypocrisy of Hippocrates: Ethics from Medical Oaths". The Yale Global Health Review. 8 (1).
- "Oath of Initiation (Caraka Samhita)". Encyclopedia.com. Encyclopedia of Bioethics. Archived from the original on 2022-03-14.
- "Rogabhishagjitiya Vimana: Vimana Sthana Chapter 8. Methods of conquering debate and disease". Charak Samhita New Live Edition. Charak Samhita Research, Training and Skill Development Centre.
- For another English translation of the Charak shapath see: Kaviraj Avinash Chandra Kaviratna (1890). Charaka-Samhita – translated in to English. Calcutta: Pareshnath Sarma, son of Kaviraj Avinash Chandra Kaviratna. pp. 552–557.
