= Sefer Refuot =

Earliest-known medical book written in Hebrew

Sefer Refuot (Hebrew: ספר רפואות, "The Book of Medicines"), also known as Sefer Asaph (English: /ˈsˈɛfərˈeɪ.sæf/ Ay-saf, Hebrew: ספר אסף, "The Book of Asaph" or "Asaf"), is the earliest-known medical book written in Hebrew. Attributed or dedicated to Asaph the Physician (also known as Asaph ben Berechiah; possibly a Byzantine Jew; or possibly identifiable with Asif ibn Barkhiya, a legendary mystical polymath vizier in Arabic folklore, associated with King Solomon) and one Yoḥanan ben Zabda, who may have lived in Byzantine Palestine or Mesopotamia between the 3rd and 6th Centuries CE (though this is very uncertain, and some have suggested that Asaph and Yoḥanan were both legendary sages in Jewish tradition, to whom the text was dedicated; not its literal authors). The date of the text is uncertain, with most manuscripts coming from the late medieval era; though the lack of Arabian medical knowledge in the book implies it may have originally been written much earlier.

== Content ==
Sefer Refuot discusses illnesses, treatments and prevention. It shows great interest in general fitness and wellbeing through regimens of regular exercise, eating healthy food, and personal hygiene. The book shows concern for providing medicine for the poor and an interest in fostering medicine as a distinct profession. It gives a theory of blood vessels and circulation. The book also prescribes different remedies for each month of the year, based on the believed effects that astrology had upon the body's humors. The introduction to the book is in the form of the later Midrash, and ascribes the origin of medicine to Shem, who received it from angels.

It was studied by Ludwig Venetianer who noted possible Persian links.

The work notably includes the Oath of Asaph, a code of conduct for Jewish physicians, strongly resembling the Hippocratic Oath. Item 6 (the 5th prohibition) also resembles an item from the Indian Caraka Samhita. It was taken by medical students at their graduation.

== Oath of Asaph text ==
1. This is the pact which Asaph ben Berakhyahu and Yoḥanan ben Zabda made with their pupils, and they adjured them with the following words:
2. Do not attempt to kill any soul by means of a potion of herbs,
3. Do not make a woman [who is] pregnant [as a result] of whoring take a drink with a view to causing abortion,
4. Do not covet beauty of form in women with a view to fornicating with them,
5. Do not divulge the secret of a man who has trusted you,
6. Do not take any reward [which may be offered in order to induce you] to destroy and to ruin,
7. Do not harden your heart [and turn it away] from pitying the poor and healing the needy,
8. Do not say of [what is] good; it is bad, nor of [what is] bad: it is good,
9. Do not adopt the ways of the sorcerers using [as they do] charms, augury and sorcery in order to separate a man from the wife of his bosom or a woman from the companion of her youth,
10. You shall not covet any wealth or reward [which may be offered in order to induce you] to help in a lustful desire,
11. You shall not seek help in any idolatrous [worship] so as to heal through [a recourse to idols], and you shall not heal with anything [pertaining] to their worship,
12. But on the contrary detest and abhor and hate all those who worship them, put their trust in them, and give assurance [referring] to them,
13. For they are all naught, useless, for they are nothing, demons, spirits of the dead; they cannot help their own corpses, how then could they help those who live?
14. Now [then] put your trust in the Lord, your God, [who is] a true God, a living God,
15. For [it is] He who kills and makes alive, who wounds and heals,
16. Who teaches men knowledge and also to profit,
17. Who wounds with justice and righteousness, and who heals with pity and compassion,
18. No designs of [His] sagacity are beyond His [power]
19. And nothing is hidden from His eyes.
20. Who causes curative plants to grow,
21. Who puts sagacity into the hearts of the wise in order that they should heal through the abundance of His loving-kindness, and that they should recount wonders in the congregation of many; so that every living [being] knows that He made him and that there is no saviour [other] than He.
22. For the nations trust in their idols, who [are supposed] to save them from their distress and will not deliver them from their misfortunes
23. For their trust and hope is in the dead.
24. For this [reason] it is fitting to keep yourselves separate from them; to remove yourselves and keep far away from all the abominations of their idols,
25. And to cleave to the name of the Lord God of spirits for all flesh,
26. And the soul of every living being is in His hand to kill and to make live,
27. And there is none that can deliver out of His hand.
28. Remember Him always and seek Him in truth, in righteousness in an upright way, in order that you should prosper in all your works
29. And He will give you help to make you prosper in [what you are doing], and you shall be [said to be] happy in the mouth of all flesh.
30. And the nations will abandon their idols and images and will desire to worship God like you,
31. For they will know that their trust is in vain and their endeavor fruitless,
32. For they implore a god, who will not do good [to them], who will not save [them].
33. As for you, be strong, do not let your hands be weak, for your work shall be rewarded,
34. The Lord is with you, while you are with Him,
35. If you keep His pact, follow His commandments, cleaving to them,
36. You will be regarded as His saints in the eyes of all flesh, and they will say:
37. Happy the people whose [lot] is such, happy the people whose God is the Lord.
38. Their pupils answered saying:
39. We will do all that you exhorted and ordered us [to do],
40. For it is a commandment of the Torah,
41. And we must do it with all our heart, with all our soul and with all our might, To do and to obey
42. Not to swerve or turn aside to the right hand or the left
43. And they [Asaph and Yohanan] blessed them in the name of God most high, maker of heaven and earth.
44. And they continued to charge them, and said:
45. The Lord God, His saints and His Torah [bear] witness, that you should fear Him, that you should not turn aside from His commandments, and that you should follow His laws with an upright heart,
46. You shall not incline after lucre [so as] to help a godless [man in shedding] innocent blood.
47. You shall not mix a deadly drug for any man or woman so that he [or she] should kill their fellow-man.
48. You shall not speak of the herbs [out of which such drugs are made]. You shall not hand them over to any man,
49. And you shall not talk about any matter [connected] with this,
50. You shall not use blood in any work of medicine,
51. You shall not attempt to provoke an ailment in a human soul through [the use of] iron instruments or searing with fire before making an examination two or three times; then [only] should you give your advice.
52. You shall not be ruled - your eyes and your heart being lifted up - by a haughty spirit.
53. Do not keep [in your hearts] the vindictiveness of hatred with regard to a sick man,
54. You shall not change your words in anything,
55. The Lord our God hates [?] [this?] being done,
56. But keep His orders and commandments, and follow all His ways, in order to please Him, [and] to be pure, true and upright.
57. Thus did Asaph and Yohanan exhort and adjure their pupils.

== Legacy ==
The Israeli hospital Assaf HaRofeh is named after the author. Excerpts from the book appear in a modern Hebrew edition by Suessman Muntner.

== Additional reading ==
- Amar, Zohar (2022). Asaph's book of medicines: treatise on the properties of foodstuffs (in Hebrew). Kiryat Ono.

== See also ==
- Seventeen Rules of Enjuin
