= Asif ibn Barkhiya =

Figure in Islamic tradition who brought Queen of Sheba's throne to Solomon

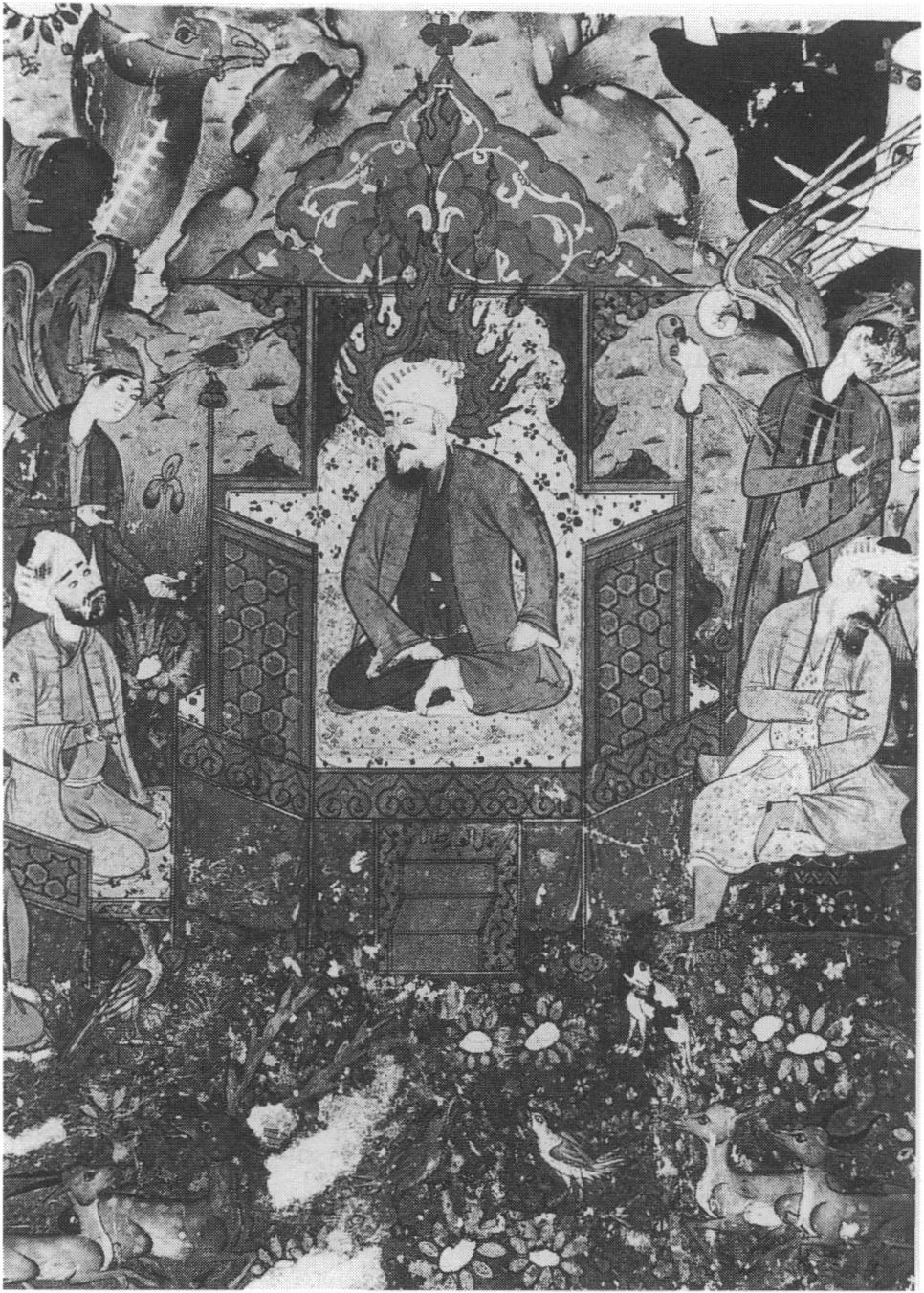
King Solomon enthroned between grand vizier Asif (left) and king of jinn (right). A 16th-century (Safavid) miniature.

Āṣif bin Barkhiyā (Arabic: آصف بن برخيا) is thought to be the Islamic scriptural figure who brought the Queen of Sheba's throne to King Solomon "...in the twinkling of an eye". Credited with the role of court vizier, it is a story occasionally recounted in Middle Eastern lore, but perhaps more so in occult circles. The figure himself is largely unexpounded, as very few references to him are found in classical texts other than through subtle terms in Chapter 27 of the Qur'an. He is, however, apparent in a number of books that deal with Islamic occultism or Ruhaniyya, and in one that appears to be attributed directly to him (titled, al-Ajnas). In like manner, through the ages he was eminently revered by the Quranic exegetical traditions where the powers he possessed were associated to the Ineffable Name of Allah.

He can be identified as the biblical figure Asaph, son of Berachiah the Gershonite mentioned in 2 Chronicles 20:14.

== Narration ==
The Qur'anic narrative is as follows:

He said, 'O Council, which one of you will bring me her throne, before they come to me in surrender?' ^{[Quran 27:38]} An Ifrit of the jinns said, 'I will bring it to thee, before thou risest from thy place; I have strength for it ^{[Quran 27:39]} and I am trusty.' Said he who possessed knowledge of the Book, 'I will bring it to thee, before ever thy glance returns to thee.' Then, when he saw it settled before him, he said, 'This is of my Lord's bounty that He may try me, whether I am thankful or ungrateful. Whosoever gives thanks gives thanks only for his own soul's good, and whosoever is ungrateful -- my Lord is surely All-sufficient, All-generous.' ^{[Quran 27:40]} He said, 'Disguise her throne for her, and we shall behold whether she is guided or if she is of those that are not guided.' ^{[Quran 27:41]} So, when she came, it was said, 'Is thy throne like this?' She said, 'It seems the same.' 'And we were given the knowledge before her, and we were in surrender, ^{[Quran 27:42]}

== Commentary ==
Ibn Kathir's dissertation in Tafsir ibn Kathir:

(One with whom was knowledge of the Scripture said: ) Ibn `Abbas said, "This was Asif, the scribe of Sulayman." It was also narrated by Muhammad bin Ishaq from Yazid bin Ruman that he was Asif bin Barkhiya' and he was a truthful believer who knew the Greatest Name of Allah. Qatadah said: "He was a believer among the humans, and his name was Asif ." (I will bring it to you within the twinkling of an eye!) Meaning, lift your gaze and look as far as you can, and before you get tired and blink, you will find it before you. Then he got up, performed ablution and prayed to Allah, may He be exalted. Mujahid said: "He said, O Owner of majesty and honor." When Sulayman and his chiefs saw it before them...

In Twelver Shia branch, according to Kitab al-Kafi, Imam Hasan al-Askari narrates that the greatest name of Allah has seventy three letters and Asif only knew one. With that letter, the land between him and the throne of the Queen of Sheeba shrank such that he was able to place the throne before Sulayman and the land returned to its original state before the blinking of an eye. He then further states that the Imams of Ahl al-Bayt know seventy two of the letters and the final letter is kept exclusively with Allah as knowledge of the ghaib.
