= Hippocratic Oath =

Oath of ethics taken by physicians

The Hippocratic Oath is an oath of ethics historically taken by physicians. It is one of the most widely known of Greek medical texts. In its original form, it requires a new physician to swear, by a number of healing gods, to uphold specific ethical standards. The oath is the earliest expression of medical ethics in the Western world, establishing several principles of medical ethics which remain of paramount significance today. These include the principles of medical confidentiality and non-maleficence. As the foundational expression of certain principles that continue to guide and inform medical practice, the ancient text is of more than historic and symbolic value. It is enshrined in the legal statutes of various jurisdictions, such that violations of the oath may carry criminal or other liability beyond the oath's symbolic nature.

== Text of the oath ==
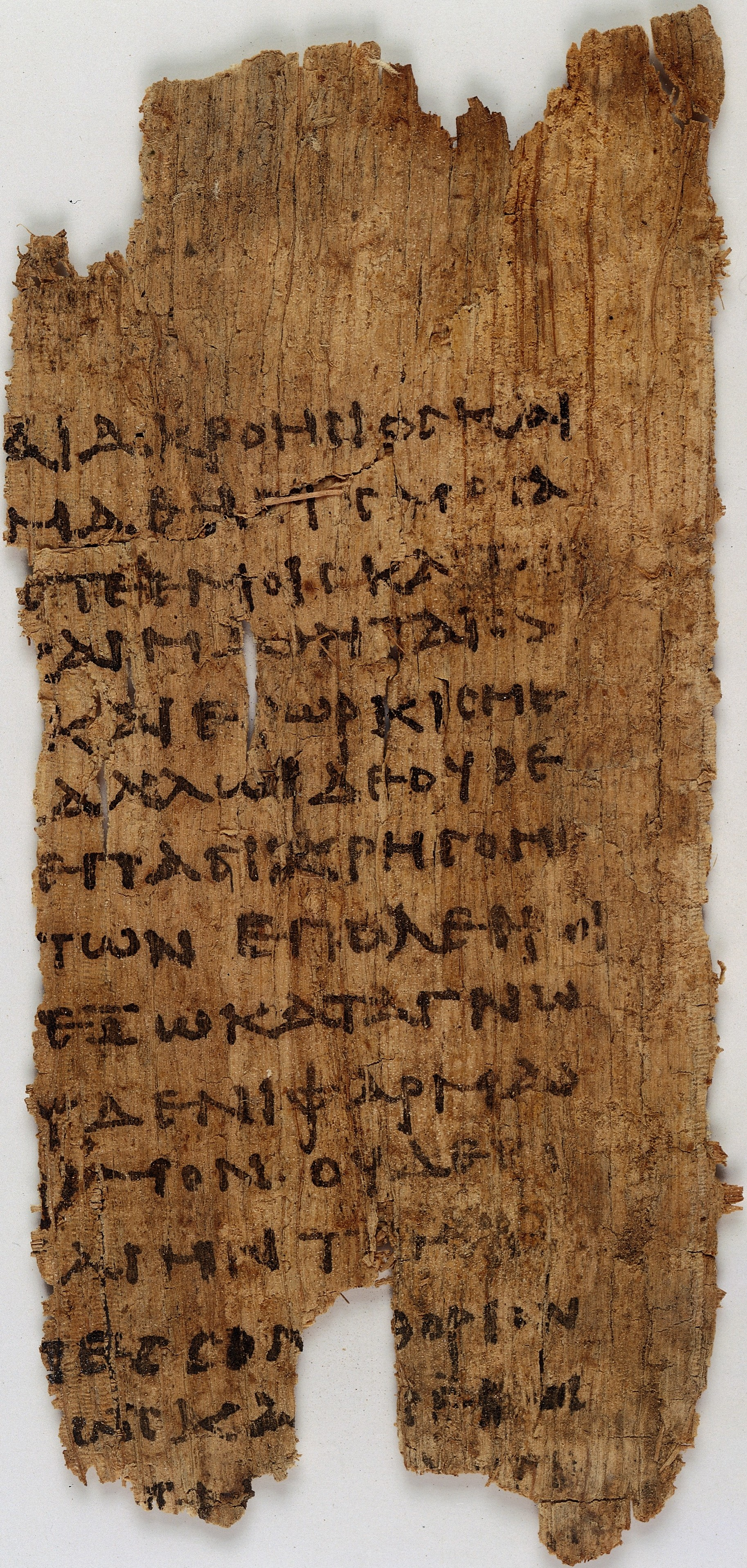
A fragment of the oath on the 3rd-century Papyrus Oxyrhynchus 2547.

The original oath was written in Ancient Greek, between the fifth and third centuries BC. Although it is traditionally attributed to the Greek doctor Hippocrates and it is usually included in the Hippocratic Corpus, modern scholars do not regard it as having been written by Hippocrates himself. The oldest manuscript containing the oath dates to roughly the 10th–11th century, held in the Vatican Library, although papyrus fragments of the oath have been found as early as the 3rd century AD.

Below is the Hippocratic Oath, in Ancient Greek, from the 1923 Loeb edition, followed by the English translation:

ὄμνυμι Ἀπόλλωνα ἰητρὸν καὶ Ἀσκληπιὸν καὶ Ὑγείαν καὶ Πανάκειαν καὶ θεοὺς πάντας τε καὶ πάσας, ἵστορας ποιεύμενος, ἐπιτελέα ποιήσειν κατὰ δύναμιν καὶ κρίσιν ἐμὴν ὅρκον τόνδε καὶ συγγραφὴν τήνδε:

ἡγήσεσθαι μὲν τὸν διδάξαντά με τὴν τέχνην ταύτην ἴσα γενέτῃσιν ἐμοῖς, καὶ βίου κοινώσεσθαι, καὶ χρεῶν χρηΐζοντι μετάδοσιν ποιήσεσθαι, καὶ γένος τὸ ἐξ αὐτοῦ ἀδελφοῖς ἴσον ἐπικρινεῖν ἄρρεσι, καὶ διδάξειν τὴν τέχνην ταύτην, ἢν χρηΐζωσι μανθάνειν, ἄνευ μισθοῦ καὶ συγγραφῆς, παραγγελίης τε καὶ ἀκροήσιος καὶ τῆς λοίπης ἁπάσης μαθήσιος μετάδοσιν ποιήσεσθαι υἱοῖς τε ἐμοῖς καὶ τοῖς τοῦ ἐμὲ διδάξαντος, καὶ μαθητῇσι συγγεγραμμένοις τε καὶ ὡρκισμένοις νόμῳ ἰητρικῷ, ἄλλῳ δὲ οὐδενί.

διαιτήμασί τε χρήσομαι ἐπ᾽ ὠφελείῃ καμνόντων κατὰ δύναμιν καὶ κρίσιν ἐμήν, ἐπὶ δηλήσει δὲ καὶ ἀδικίῃ εἴρξειν.

οὐ δώσω δὲ οὐδὲ φάρμακον οὐδενὶ αἰτηθεὶς θανάσιμον, οὐδὲ ὑφηγήσομαι συμβουλίην τοιήνδε: ὁμοίως δὲ οὐδὲ γυναικὶ πεσσὸν φθόριον δώσω.

ἁγνῶς δὲ καὶ ὁσίως διατηρήσω βίον τὸν ἐμὸν καὶ τέχνην τὴν ἐμήν.

οὐ τεμέω δὲ οὐδὲ μὴν λιθιῶντας, ἐκχωρήσω δὲ ἐργάτῃσιν ἀνδράσι πρήξιος τῆσδε.

ἐς οἰκίας δὲ ὁκόσας ἂν ἐσίω, ἐσελεύσομαι ἐπ᾽ ὠφελείῃ καμνόντων, ἐκτὸς ἐὼν πάσης ἀδικίης ἑκουσίης καὶ φθορίης, τῆς τε ἄλλης καὶ ἀφροδισίων ἔργων ἐπί τε γυναικείων σωμάτων καὶ ἀνδρῴων, ἐλευθέρων τε καὶ δούλων.

ἃ δ᾽ ἂν ἐνθεραπείῃ ἴδω ἢ ἀκούσω, ἢ καὶ ἄνευ θεραπείης κατὰ βίον ἀνθρώπων, ἃ μὴ χρή ποτε ἐκλαλεῖσθαι ἔξω, σιγήσομαι, ἄρρητα ἡγεύμενος εἶναι τὰ τοιαῦτα.

ὅρκον μὲν οὖν μοι τόνδε ἐπιτελέα ποιέοντι, καὶ μὴ συγχέοντι, εἴη ἐπαύρασθαι καὶ βίου καὶ τέχνης δοξαζομένῳ παρὰ πᾶσιν ἀνθρώποις ἐς τὸν αἰεὶ χρόνον: παραβαίνοντι δὲ καὶ ἐπιορκέοντι, τἀναντία τούτων.

Translation:

I swear by Apollo Healer, by Asclepius, by Hygieia, by Panacea, and by all the gods and goddesses, making them my witnesses, that I will carry out, according to my ability and judgment, this oath and this indenture.

To hold my teacher in this art equal to my own parents; to make him partner in my livelihood; when he is in need of money to share mine with him; to consider his family as my own brothers, and to teach them this art, if they want to learn it, without fee or indenture; to impart precept, oral instruction, and all other instruction to my own sons, the sons of my teacher, and to indentured pupils who have taken the Healer's oath, but to nobody else.

I will use those dietary regimens which will benefit my patients according to my greatest ability and judgment, and I will do no harm or injustice to them. Neither will I administer a poison to anybody when asked to do so, nor will I suggest such a course. Similarly I will not give to a woman a pessary to cause abortion. But I will keep pure and holy both my life and my art. I will not use the knife, not even, verily, on sufferers from stone, but I will give place to such as are craftsmen therein.

Into whatsoever houses I enter, I will enter to help the sick, and I will abstain from all intentional wrong-doing and harm, especially from abusing the bodies of man or woman, bond or free. And whatsoever I shall see or hear in the course of my profession, as well as outside my profession in my intercourse with men, if it be what should not be published abroad, I will never divulge, holding such things to be holy secrets.

Now if I carry out this oath, and break it not, may I gain for ever reputation among all men for my life and for my art; but if I break it and forswear myself, may the opposite befall me.

— Translation by W.H.S. Jones

== Context and interpretation ==
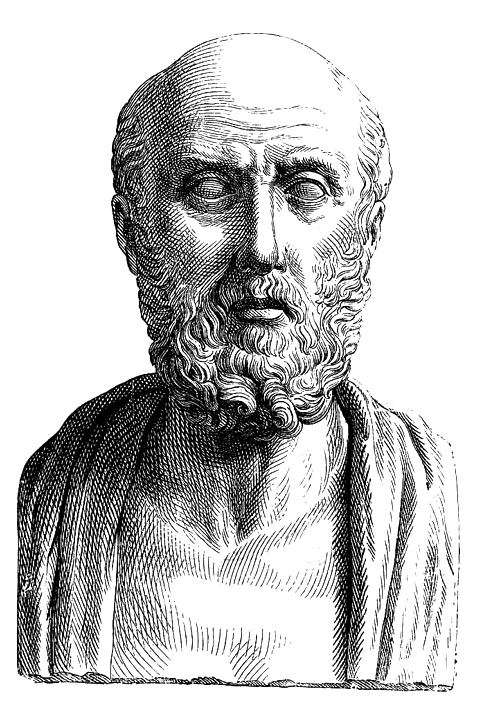
The Greek physician Hippocrates (460–370 BC), to whom the oath is traditionally attributed, though most modern scholars challenge that attribution.

The oath is arguably the best known text of the Hippocratic Corpus, although most modern scholars do not attribute it to Hippocrates himself, estimating it to have been written in the fourth or fifth century BC. Its general ethical principles are also found in other works of the Corpus: the work entitled Physician mentions the obligation to keep the "holy things" of medicine within the medical community (i.e. not to divulge secrets); it also mentions the special position of the doctor with regard to his patients, especially women and girls. In antiquity, the punishment for breaking the Hippocratic oath could range from a penalty to losing the right to practice medicine. However, several aspects of the oath contradict patterns of practice established elsewhere in the Corpus. Most notable is its ban on the use of the knife, even for small procedures such as lithotomy, even though other works in the Corpus provide guidance on performing surgical procedures.

=== Euthanasia ===
The oath appears to prohibit physicians from administering lethal drugs in all cases, including when requested by a patient. But ancient evidence suggests that physicians did not universally observe such a ban. Scholars disagree about what the prohibition was specifically intended to prevent. The phrasing has been variously interpreted as a prohibition of physician-assisted suicide, participation in judicial executions, murder (including political assassination), or any general use of medical knowledge to cause death.

=== Abortion ===
In the earliest surviving reference to the oath, written in 43 AD, Scribonius Largus was adamant that it forbade abortion. In the first or second century AD work Gynaecology, Soranus of Ephesus wrote that one party of medical practitioners followed the oath and banished all abortifacients, while the other party—to which he belonged—was willing to prescribe abortions, but only for the sake of the mother's health. William Henry Samuel Jones believes that, although the oath prohibited abortions, they may not have been condemned under all circumstances. John M. Riddle argues that because Hippocrates specified pessaries, he only meant pessaries and therefore it was acceptable for a Hippocratic doctor to perform abortions using oral drugs, violent means, a disruption of daily routine or eating habits, and more. Other scholars, most notably Ludwig Edelstein, believe that the author intended to prohibit any and all abortions. It is also possible the ban means forbidding the women specifically from deciding to have an abortion, limiting the right of that decision to the men. Olivia De Brabandere writes that regardless of the author's original intention, the vague and polyvalent nature of the relevant line has allowed both professionals and non-professionals to interpret and use the oath in several ways. While many Christian versions of the Hippocratic Oath, particularly from the Middle Ages, explicitly prohibited abortion, the prohibition is often omitted from many oaths taken in US medical schools today, though it remains controversial.

=== Religious themes ===
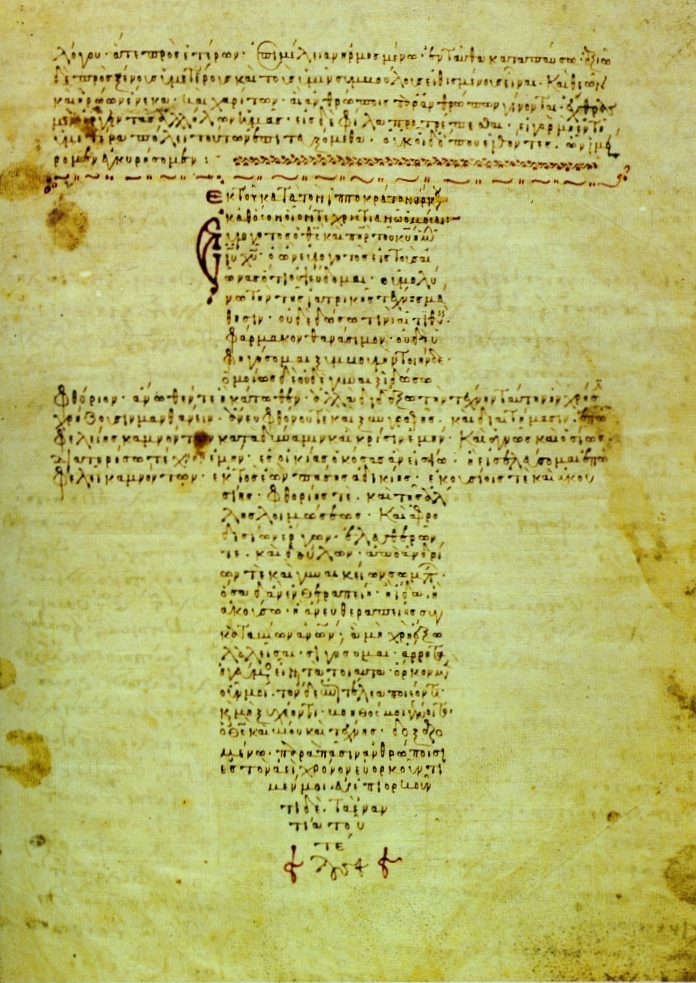
A 12th-century Greek manuscript of the oath in the shape of a cross. The oath continued to be in use in the Byzantine Christian world, with its references to pagan deities replaced by a Christian preamble.

The oath stands out among comparable ancient texts on medical ethics and professionalism through its heavily religious tone, a factor which makes attributing its authorship to Hippocrates particularly difficult. Phrases such as "but I will keep pure and holy both my life and my art" suggest a deep, almost monastic devotion to the art of medicine. He who keeps to the oath is promised "reputation among all men for my life and for my art". This contrasts heavily with Galenic writings on professional ethics, which employ a far more pragmatic approach, where good practice is defined as effective practice, without reference to deities. The oath's importance among the medical community is nonetheless attested by its appearance on the tombstones of physicians, and by the fourth century AD it had come to stand for the medical profession. The oath continued to be in use in the Byzantine Christian world with its references to pagan deities replaced by a Christian preamble. The ninth century translation of the oath into Arabic, as part of the transmission of Greek medical knowledge into the Islamic world, also replaced part of the preamble with an Islamic one (translated: "I swear by God, the Lord of life and death, the Bestower of health, and the Creator of healing and all remedies").

=== "First do no harm" ===
Although it is often said that "First do no harm" (Latin: Primum non nocere) is a part of the original Hippocratic oath, no such phrase from which "First" or "Primum" can be translated appears in the text of the original oath, although a similar intention is vowed by, "I will abstain from all intentional wrong-doing and harm". Another related phrase is found in Epidemics, Book I, of the Hippocratic school: "Practice two things in your dealings with disease: either help or do not harm the patient" and it likely took shape from longstanding popular nonmedical expression.

== Modern versions and relevance ==
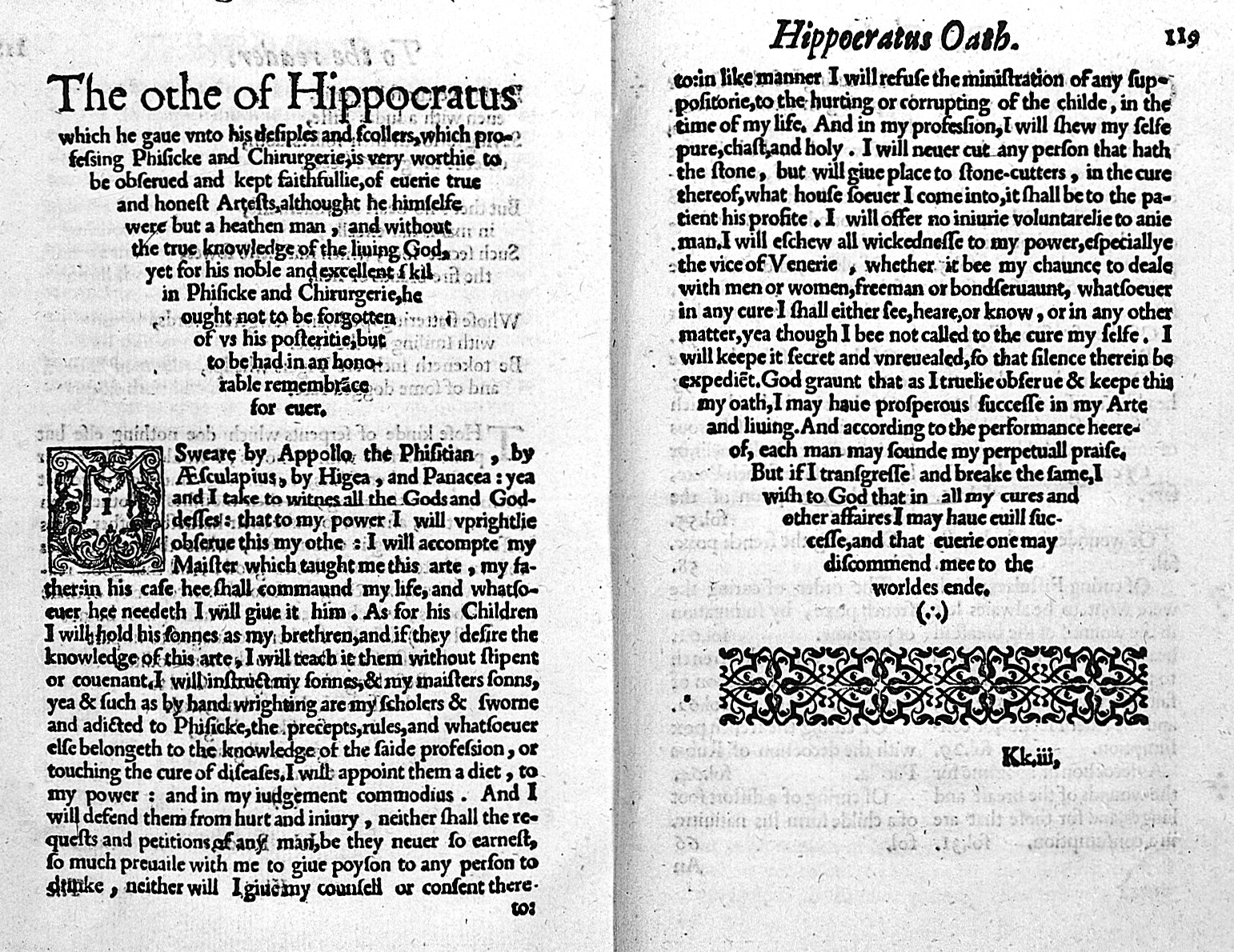
Hippocratic Oath in a surgical treatise by Franciscus Arcaeus (1493–1573?), English edition of 1588

The Hippocratic Oath has been eclipsed as a document of professional ethics by more extensive works. The first example in modern times was by Thomas Percival at Manchester Royal Infirmary, who published a code of 'medical ethics' in 1803. It was then adapted by other medical associations, such as the American Medical Association's Code of Medical Ethics (first adopted in 1847) and the British General Medical Council's Good Medical Practice. These documents provide a comprehensive overview of the obligations and professional behaviour of a doctor to their patients and wider society. Doctors who violate these codes may be subjected to disciplinary proceedings, including the loss of their license to practice medicine. The lengthiness of these documents has made their distillations into shorter oaths an attractive proposition. In light of this fact, several updates to the oath have been offered in modern times, some facetious.

In 1948, the World Medical Association (WMA) drafted a medical oath, called the Declaration of Geneva. "During the post World War II and immediately after its foundation, the WMA showed concern over the state of medical ethics in general and over the world. The WMA took up the responsibility for setting ethical guidelines for the world's physicians. It noted that in those years the custom of medical schools to administer an oath to its doctors upon graduation or receiving a license to practice medicine had fallen into disuse or become a mere formality". In Nazi Germany, medical students did not take the Hippocratic Oath, although they knew the ethic of "nil nocere"—do no harm.

In 1964, Louis Lasagna, Academic Dean of the School of Medicine at Tufts University, wrote a modern version of the Hippocratic Oath. It omitted the prayer while focusing on "utmost respect for human life from its beginning", making it a more secular obligation, not only to be taken in the presence of any gods, but before people. This version is still in use today by many US medical schools:

I swear to fulfill, to the best of my ability and judgment, this covenant:

I will respect the hard-won scientific gains of those physicians in whose steps I walk, and gladly share such knowledge as is mine with those who are to follow.

I will apply, for the benefit of the sick, all measures [that] are required, avoiding those twin traps of overtreatment and therapeutic nihilism.

I will remember that there is art to medicine as well as science, and that warmth, sympathy, and understanding may outweigh the surgeon's knife or the chemist's drug.

I will not be ashamed to say "I know not", nor will I fail to call in my colleagues when the skills of another are needed for a patient's recovery.

I will respect the privacy of my patients, for their problems are not disclosed to me that the world may know. Most especially must I tread with care in matters of life and death. If it is given me to save a life, all thanks. But it may also be within my power to take a life; this awesome responsibility must be faced with great humbleness and awareness of my own frailty. Above all, I must not play at God.

I will remember that I do not treat a fever chart, a cancerous growth, but a sick human being, whose illness may affect the person's family and economic stability. My responsibility includes these related problems, if I am to care adequately for the sick.

I will prevent disease whenever I can, for prevention is preferable to cure.

I will remember that I remain a member of society, with special obligations to all my fellow human beings, those sound of mind and body as well as the infirm.

If I do not violate this oath, may I enjoy life and art, respected while I live and remembered with affection thereafter. May I always act so as to preserve the finest traditions of my calling and may I long experience the joy of healing those who seek my help.

In a 1989 survey of 126 US medical schools, only three of them reported use of the original oath, while thirty-three used the Declaration of Geneva, sixty-seven used a modified Hippocratic Oath, four used the Oath of Maimonides, one used a covenant, eight used another oath, one used an unknown oath, and two did not use any kind of oath. Seven medical schools did not reply to the survey. As of 1993, only 14% of medical oaths prohibited euthanasia, and only 8% prohibited abortion. In a 2000 survey of US medical schools, all of the then-extant medical schools administered some type of professional oath. Among schools of modern medicine, 62 of 122 used the Hippocratic Oath, or a modified version of it. The other 60 schools used the original or modified Declaration of Geneva, Oath of Maimonides, or an oath authored by students or faculty or both. As of 2018, all US medical school graduates made some form of public oath but none used the original Hippocratic Oath. A modified form or an oath unique to that school is often used. A review of 18 of these oaths was criticized for their wide variability: "Consistency would help society see that physicians are members of a profession that's committed to a shared set of essential ethical values." All 19 osteopathic schools in the United States used the Osteopathic Oath, which is taken in place of or in addition to the Hippocratic Oath. The Osteopathic Oath was first used in 1938, and the current version has been in use since 1954.

There is no direct punishment for breaking the Hippocratic Oath, although an arguable equivalent in modern times is medical malpractice, which carries a wide range of punishments, from civil penalties to imprisonment. Medical professionals may also be subject to other parts of the criminal and civil law for conduct contrary to both an oath taken and to a more general prohibition on, for example, doing physical or other harm to other persons. In the United States, several major judicial decisions have made reference to the classical Hippocratic Oath, either upholding or dismissing its bounds for medical ethics: Roe v. Wade, Washington v. Harper, Compassion in Dying v. State of Washington (1996), and Thorburn v. Department of Corrections (1998).

In France, it is common for new medical graduates to sign a written oath.

In 1995, Sir Joseph Rotblat, in his acceptance speech for the Nobel Peace Prize, suggested a Hippocratic Oath for Scientists.

In November 2005, Saparmurat Niyazov, then leader of Turkmenistan, declared that doctors should swear an oath to him instead of the Hippocratic Oath.

In 2022, at a college in the Indian state of Tamil Nadu, medical students took the Charaka shapath, a Sanskrit oath attributed to ancient sage and physician Maharishi Charak instead of the Hippocratic oath. The state government subsequently dismissed the Dean of the Madurai medical college for this act. However, he was reinstated by the Tamil Nadu government and assumed office 4 days later.

== See also ==
- Hospital Corpsman Pledge
- Medical ethics
- Participation of medical professionals in American executions
- Patient safety
- Peelian principles
- Primum non nocere
- Sushruta § Followers
- Sun Simiao
- White Coat Ceremony

Ethical codes of conduct for physicians

- Charaka shapath
- Declaration of Geneva
- Nightingale Pledge
- Oath of Asaph
- Seventeen Rules of Enjuin
- Vejjavatapada

Ethical principles for human experimentation

- Declaration of Helsinki
- Human experimentation in the United States
- Nuremberg code

Ethical practices for engineers

- Iron Ring
- Order of the Engineer
- Ritual of the Calling of an Engineer

Science

- Hippocratic Oath for Scientists
