= Maimonides (disambiguation) =

Maimonides (1135/1138–1204) was a medieval Jewish philosopher.

Maimonides may also refer to:

== People ==
- Abraham Maimonides (1186–1237), son of Maimonides

== Education ==
- Maimonides School, a Jewish day school in Brookline, Massachusetts
- Maimonides College, defunct Jewish institute of higher education in Philadelphia (1867–1873)

== Religion ==
- Maimonidean Controversy, Jewish philosophical dispute
- Maimonides Heritage Center, heritage center in Israel
- Maimonides Synagogue, a historic synagogue in Cairo, Egypt
- Tomb of Maimonides, rebuilt Jewish holy site in Israel

== Healthcare ==
- Maimonides Geriatric Centre, hospital in Quebec, Canada
- Maimonides Medical Center, in Brooklyn, New York
- Maimonides Midwood Community Hospital, hospital in Brooklyn, New York
- Rambam Maimonides Medical Journal, academic journal

== Other ==
- Maimonides Foundation, former name of the Khalili Foundation, an interfaith foundation in London, England
- Maimonides Park, a minor league baseball stadium in Coney Island, Brooklyn, New York City
- Maimonides' rule, rule used to evaluate the effect of class size on student test scores
- Oath of Maimonides, oath taken by pharmacists
