= David ben Amram Adani =

14th century Yemenite Jewish scholar

David ben Amram Adani (14th-century CE) was a Yemenite Jewish scholar renowned for his authorship of Midrash HaGadol, (Note: Solomon Fisch (1957), pp. 17–ff. (Preface), held a dissenting view and conjectured that Midrash HaGadol was compiled by Abraham ben Moses Maimonides.) a collection of homiletical expositions drawn from ancient rabbinic sources. Adani is believed to have descended from a line of prominent Jewish leaders in Aden, as he is referred to in one ancient source as "David b. Amram, the nagid from the city of Aden." Nagid is a title borne by the leader of the Jewish community of Aden from the 12th century.

== Life ==
Little is known of Adani's life, except that he was a gifted poet. All that which remains of his poetry, however, are the rhymed Hebrew poems which he penned at the introduction to each biblical parashah in the Midrash HaGadol, and one poem written for the liturgies cited on the Day of Atonement, entitled Naḍid er-Raḥamīm (נצ'ד אלרחמים), in Judeo-Arabic. Other poems of his which have survived are a poetic introduction to the Jewish laws of ritual slaughter (Shechita) and a poem in Aramaic signed with his acrostics.

In his capacity as community leader, he had access to rare books of Jewish literature and oral traditions, of which he frequently cites in his Midrash HaGadol. Adani's Midrash HaGadol is the most disseminated of all midrashic literature found in Yemen, all of which being hand-made copies of Adani's work, written before the introduction of the printing press in Yemen. Many of these works are now housed in the manuscript department of major libraries in New York, London and Berlin.

=== Correspondence with Egypt's chief rabbi ===
In 1346, the head of Egypt's Jewish community, Yehoshua Hanagid, carried on a correspondence with Rabbi David Adani, in which the spiritual ruler of Egypt's Jewish community answered a number of questions sent to him (al-mas’āyil = responsa) by the community in Yemen, mostly on matters relating to what seemed to be contradictions between two halakhic rulings in Maimonides' Mishne Torah and his Sefer ha-Mitzvot, although other questions simply relate, not to Maimonides, but to one of the other rabbinic sources, such as the words of the Sifra, in affirmative command no. 89. Some of the questions deal with practical halakha, such as those issues addressed in Seder Ahavah and Zemanim of Maimonides' Mishne Torah, as well as on the laws affecting women and marriages. In one question, David Adani requests of the Nagid in Egypt to arrange for the people of Yemen the set-order or cycle of nineteen calendar years, according to the Hebrew calendar, with their intercalated months, beginning with the year 1,663 of the Seleucid era (1352 CE). More than one-hundred questions and responsa were exchanged between the two men.

== Poetry ==
The rhymed poetic openings used by David Adani at the start of each parashah in the Midrash HaGadol are reminiscent of Rabbi Hai ben Nahshon Gaon's midrash Pitheron Torah (Torah Solution), a work thought to have been compiled about 886–896 CE. Their primary intent is to grace the midrashic works under discussion.

מרשות בורא שבעה רקיעים	merǝšūṯ boré šivʻah rǝqīʻīm	By the authority of Him who creates seven firmaments
מיוחד ומפורש בשמות שבעים	meyuḥad u-mǝforaš bešemoṯ šivʻīm	He who is Special, and who is expressed by seventy names
יתברך שמו שכחו עולם מרעים	yiṯbaraḫ šǝmo šǝkoḥo ʻolam marʻīm	May His name be blessed, by whose power the world shakes
הכל מודים לו טובים ורעים	ha-kol modīm lo ṭovīm wǝ-raʻīm	All persons acknowledge Him, both good men and wicked men
בחר בעמו והבדילם מן התועים	baḥar bǝʻammo wi-hivdillam min ha-toʻīm	He that chose His people and distinguished them from those who err
סגלם וקראם ילד שעשועים	siğlam u-qra’am yeled šaʻašūʻīm	He made of them a peculiar [race] and called them a delightful child.
ונתן לנו תורתו מפלאות תמים דעים	wǝ-naṯan lanū ṯoraṯo miflǝ’oṯ tǝmīm deʻīm	And He gave unto us His Law, even the wonders of the All-knowing
על יד ציר נאמן אביר הרועים	ʻal yad ṣīr ne’eman ’abīr ha-roʻīm	Through a faithful messenger, the noblest of the shepherds
כן ישפיע שלומינו כנחלי מבועים	ken yašpīaʻ šǝlomeinū kǝnaḥǝlei mabūʻīm	Thus may He cause our peace to emanate, as the brooks of flood waters
ונהיה דשנים ורעננים ובתורה שבעים	wǝ-nihǝyeh dǝšenīm wǝ-raʻanǝnīm u-vǝ-torah sǝveʻīm	And let us be full of ripeness and wholesomeness and satisfied in the Divine Law
ונאמר הללויה כי טוב זמרה אלהינו כי נעים	wǝ-nomar hallelū-yah kī-ṭov zamǝrah ’eloheinū kī-naʻīm	And let us say, Hallejah! For it is good to sing [to] our God, for it is pleasant

== Bibliography ==
- Fisch, Solomon, ed. (1957). Midrash Haggadol on the Pentateuch (Numbers) (in Hebrew). Vol. 1. London: L. Honig & Sons. OCLC 1049027075.
- Ratzaby, Yehuda [in Hebrew] (1978). Dictionary of the Hebrew Language used by Yemenite Jews (Osar Leshon Haqqodesh shellivne Teman) (in Hebrew). Tel-Aviv. pp. 102–104. OCLC 19166610.
- Ratzaby, Yehuda [in Hebrew] (1989). R. Jehoshua Hannagid Responsa (in Hebrew). Kiryat-Ono: Mekhon Moshe Yerushalyim. OCLC 28487560.
- Tobi, Yosef; Seri, Shalom, eds. (2000). Yalqut Teman - Lexicon of Yemenite Jewry (in Hebrew). Tel-Aviv: E'eleh betamar. OCLC 609321911.
