= Maimo =

Maimo may refer to:

- Maimonides School, a coeducational, Modern Orthodox, Jewish day school located in Brookline, Massachusetts
- École Maïmonide, school in Montreal, Canada
- Sankie Maimo (1930–2013), writer from British Southern Cameroons, later in Nigeria

== See also ==
- Moses ben Maimon (1138–1204), commonly known as Maimonides and Rambam, medieval Sephardic Jewish philosopher
- Maimonides (disambiguation)
