= MHC =

MHC may refer to:

== Biology ==
- Major histocompatibility complex, a highly polymorphic region on chromosome 6 with genes particularly involved in immune functions
- Myosin heavy chain, part of the motor protein myosin's quaternary protein structure

== Colleges ==
- Mars Hill College (now Mars Hill University), a college in Mars Hill, North Carolina, USA
- Mount Holyoke College, a college in South Hadley, Massachusetts, USA
- William E. Macaulay Honors College, an honors college within the City University of New York

== Health ==
- Managed health care
- Mental health counselor
- Metropolitan Hospital Center, East Harlem, New York City

== Sports ==
- Malaysian Hockey Confederation
- Mediterranean Handball Confederation
- Mid Hudson Conference
- Milwaukee Hurling Club

== Other ==
- Maimonides Heritage Center
- Massachusetts Historical Commission
- Mile High City, common nickname for the city of Denver, Colorado, due to its elevation of exactly one mile above sea level
- Mile high club
- Mochoʼ language (ISO 639:mhc), a moribund Mayan language spoken in Chiapas, Mexico
- Mocopulli Airport (IATA: MHC), Dalcahue, Los Lagos, Chile
- Model of hierarchical complexity
- Mohawk–Hudson convergence, a meteorological phenomenon
- Murphy-Hoffman Company
- Museum of the History of Catalonia
- A US Navy hull classification symbol: Coastal minehunter (MHC)
