= Ya'akov Moshe Toledano =

Israeli rabbi

- Toledano in 1960

Ministerial roles
- 1958–1960: Minister of Religions

Personal details
- Born: 18 August 1880; Tiberias, Ottoman Empire
- Died: 15 October 1960 (aged 80); Jerusalem, Israel

Rabbi Ya'akov Moshe Toledano (Hebrew: יעקב משה טולדאנו; 17 August 1880 – 15 October 1960) was an Israeli rabbi who served as Minister of Religions of Israel for two brief periods between 1958 and 1960. He also served as chief rabbi of Cairo, Alexandria and Tel Aviv.

== Biography ==
Toledano was born on 17 August 1880 in Tiberias, then in the Ottoman Empire. He was the son of Rabbi Yehuda Toledano who had emigrated from Meknes in 1862. After being educated in a local yeshiva, In 1899 he started writing for Havatzelet. he served a member of the city council and the head of the Mizrachi party in the city. Following a cholera outbreak in Tiberias in 1903, Toledon's family moved to Peki'in.

During World War I Toledano was one of 700 Jews expelled by the Ottoman authorities due to holding French citizenship, moving to Corsica. In 1920 he returned to Tiberias and the following year participated in the rabbinical conference in Jerusalem that established the Chief Rabbinate. Toledano purchased land from the local Arabs around the Tomb of Maimonides and the tomb of Rabbi Akiva, building a wall around the Tomb of Maimonides and financing the establishments of several new neighborhoods.

Between 1926 and 1929 Toledano was a member of the Chief Rabbinate in Tangier. In 1929 he became deputy Chief Rabbi of Cairo, and four years later also made deputy Chief Rabbi of Alexandria and deputy head of Cairo's rabbinical court of appeal. He was appointed chief rabbi of Alexandia in 1932 and in 1942 was elected as the Sephardi Chief Rabbi of Tel Aviv. He held this position until 1958.

He left this job to become Minister of Religious Affairs in the eighth government on 3 December 1958, despite not being a member of the Knesset. His appointment came after the religious parties had resigned from the government coalition He held the post until 30 November the following year. When David Ben-Gurion formed the ninth government on 17 December 1959, Toledano returned to his ministerial role. A month prior to his death it was revealed he had not given up his French citizenship.

In July 1960, only months before he died, he married Mary Sebag, a 25-year-old divorcee. This led to criticism from much of the Israeli media, from which Toledano defended himself by saying that the marriage was legitimate because he had complied with the Jewish law that stated a man must wait for two holidays after the death of the first wife. Toledano also stated "I'm a man of eastern tradition, and did not base my marriage on European Jewish tastes, but according to Jewish law."

Toledano died at his home in Jerusalem on 15 October 1960 at the age of 79. His funeral at Yeshurun Synagogue was attended by president Yitzhak Ben-Zvi, Prime Minister David Ben-Gurion and the rest of the cabinet. A street was named after him in the Bavli neighborhood of Tel Aviv, along with the Prize for Jewish literature established by the Tel Aviv Religious Council.

=== Famous works and teachings ===
Toledano collected and studied many ancient manuscripts of the Jews of Spain and North Africa. One of the most famous manuscripts that he discovered was the commentary of the Rambam on the Mishnah in Arabic, as it had been originally written, which Toledano discovered along with his brother Baruch Toledano in Damascus. When he was living in Israel, Toledano collaborated with archaeologist Nahum Slouschz to help discover the hot springs in Tiberias built by the Romans. In 1950, Toledano was sent by the Hebrew University of Jerusalem to Morocco where he discovered several more ancient manuscripts.

Toledano was sympathetic to Zionism and wrote several commentaries pertaining to his opinion of the Three Oaths, in which he stated that Zionism does not contradict the Three Oaths. He supported the concept of Hebrew labor and stated that it was preferable for Jews to hire other Jews, including secular Jews in his ideas. Toledano also wrote a ruling in which it was forbidden for Jews to sell weapons to non-Jews in the state of Israel. He supported the creation of a high court in Jerusalem, and under appropriate conditions supported the revival of the Sanhedrin. Rabbi Toledano wrote several religious commentaries, winning the Rav Kook Prize in 1957 in the Special Award Category for his work.
