= Yehoshua Hanagid =

Egyptian Jewish nagid (1310–1355)

- יהושע הנגיד

Nagid of the Jewish community in Egypt
- In office c. 1334 – 1355
- Preceded by: Moses ben Abraham Maimuni (probable)
- Succeeded by: David ben Joshua Maimuni

Personal details
- Born: c. 1310; Cairo, Mamluk Sultanate (now Egypt)
- Died: 1355; Cairo, Mamluk Sultanate (now Egypt)
- Citizenship: None (subject of the Mamluk Sultanate)
- Parent: Abraham (Avraham) Maimuni (son of David Maimuni) (father)
- Occupation: Rabbi; judge; physician; community leader (Nagid)
- Known for: Leadership of Egyptian Jewry; extensive responsa, especially correspondence with Yemenite scholars

Yehoshua Hanagid (Hebrew: יהושע הנגיד), alternative spelling: Jehoshua Hannagid (1310–1355), was a rabbinic scholar and judge, who began to serve as the Nagid in Cairo, Egypt, at the age of twenty-four. He was the fifth-generation descendant of Rabbi Moshe ben Maimon, the great Spanish Rabbi and philosopher. His full lineage is reckoned as Yehoshua, the son of Avraham, the son of David, the son of Avraham, the son Moshe ben Maimon.

== History ==
The rabbinic scholars who mentioned him in their writings have given to him different honorifics: Rabbi Joseph Karo mentions him regularly in his Kessef Mishneh by the title: הנגיד רבינו יהושע מבני בניו של רבינו (“The Nagid, our Rabbi Yehoshua, of the descendants of Rabbeinu [i.e. Maimonides]).” In Yemen, where he carried on a correspondence with the Jews of Aden, he was known as, ר' יהושע (Rabbi Yehoshua), and also as ר' יהושע הנגיד (Rabbi Yehoshua Hanagid), and occasionally as, “the descendant of Rabbeinu.” Shelomo Dov Goitein, who collected documents relating to his name in the Cairo Geniza of Fusṭāṭ, assumes that his material and social status was less than that of his fathers, Maimonides and Rabbi Abraham ben Moses ben Maimon. Moreover, he determined with certainty that his profession was a physician. The letters found in the Cairo Geniza attest to the fact that he was a provider and spiritual shepherd of the Jews of Egypt. Much of his endeavors were devoted to the Fusṭāṭ community. In one of his letters he instructs the community on the manner in which they are to exact the poll-tax (jizya) from their Jewish brethren in Egypt, the style of which is noted for its tone of gentleness.

In 1346, the Nagid carried on a correspondence with Rabbi David ben Amram Adani, the leader of the Jewish community in Yemen and author of the Midrash HaGadol, in which the Nagid answers a number of questions sent to him (al-mas’āyil = אלמסאיל), mostly on matters relating to what seems to be contradictions between two halachic rulings in Maimonides' Mishne Torah and his Sefer ha-Mitzvot, although other questions simply relate, not to Maimonides, but to one of the other rabbinic sources, such as the words of the Sifra, in affirmative command no. 89. Some of the questions deal with practical halacha, such as those addressed in Seder Ahavah and Zemanim of Maimonides' Mishne Torah, as well as on the laws affecting women and marriages. In one question, Rabbi David Adeni requests of the Nagid to arrange for the people of Yemen the set-order or cycle of nineteen calendar years, with their intercalated months, beginning with the year 1,663 of the Seleucid era (1352 CE). More than one-hundred questions and responsa were exchanged between the two men. Today, Rabbi Yehoshua Nagid's Responsa are held at the Jewish Theological Seminary of New York (Ms. 10709).

The honorific title of Nagid was carried by members of Maimonides' family for 200 years after his death.
