= Daniel HaBavli =

- Born: 1170; Damascus
- Died: 1220 (aged 49–50)

Daniel ben Saadia ha-Bavli (1170-1220) was a 13th-century talmud scholar from Damascus, a student of Samuel ben Ali, and an opponent of Maimonides. He campaigned against Maimonides' works and sent letters to his son Abraham Maimonides questioning his father after his death, and accusing him of heresy for not believing in evil spirits. Abraham published his answers, and refused to excommunicate Daniel, but David ben Samuel, the exilarch, later did so. He critiqued both the halakhic and ideological aspects of Maimonides' work, and wrote a commentary on Ecclesiastes that was a veiled polemic against him, which brought him into conflict with Maimonides' student Joseph ben Judah of Ceuta. Although Daniel corresponded with Abraham from Damascus, he likely had roots in Iraq (Babylon, as his name: ha-Bavli, the Babylonian) and his teacher was the head of the torah academy in Baghdad. His name appears in the Tahkemoni of Judah al-Harizi concerning the Damascene Jewish community, which praises his mind as an "ever-flowing spring...in his wisdom, he smashes cedar trees." Al-Harizi may have removed this after Daniel's excommunication.

== Life and Work ==
=== His Dispute Against Maimonides ===
The dispute between Rabbi Daniel and Maimonides focused on fundamental questions of faith, philosophy, and Jewish law. Rabbi Daniel, like many of his contemporaries, opposed certain views of Maimonides that were considered innovative and contrary to rabbinic tradition. He argued that Maimonides had deviated from tradition and adapted his teachings to Aristotelian philosophy.

His book of objections to Maimonides' Sefer HaMitzvot was written in Arabic, as was the Sefer HaMitzvot itself. The forty-seven objections to Mishneh Torah were written in Hebrew. Rabbi Daniel sent these objections to Rabbi Abraham ben Maimonides, who responded to them at length. The objections to Sefer HaMitzvot and the responses of Rabbi Abraham ben Maimonides were printed under the name Ma'aseh Nissim, while the objections to Mishneh Torah appear in the responsa collection Birkat Avraham.

In Adar Rishon of 4973 (1213), Rabbi Daniel sent to Rabbi Abraham ben Maimonides his objections to Sefer HaMitzvot and Mishneh Torah, in which he attempted to refute Maimonides' rulings and demonstrate that he contradicts himself from place to place. He argued in particular that the shoreshim (principles/roots) at the beginning of Sefer HaMitzvot are not fundamental, and that Maimonides himself did not consistently adhere to them. He notes that these are only some of the problems he finds in Maimonides' halakhic work, and alludes only briefly to the Guide for the Perplexed, which in his view is an invention with no basis in tradition.

"And I looked into the Guide for the Perplexed, and behold — lofty wisdoms like crystal. It uncovers hidden things, conveyed to those who know through allusions that discern, emerging entwined, bound and constructed. Never have our ears heard such things, nor have our fathers told them to us — yet it is he who made us, and not we ourselves. And in the rationales for the commandments there are analogical derivations gathered from beneath the heavens, expressed in a language I did not know — and over them hearts are aching."

In the month of Av of that same year, Rabbi Abraham ben Maimonides responded to the objections in a letter whose opening is filled with lavish praise for Rabbi Daniel's greatness and wisdom. Despite the praise, he hints that Rabbi Daniel acted with excessive arrogance in presuming to refute Maimonides' words and even claiming that explicit sources in the Mishnah and Talmud had escaped him. In many cases Rabbi Abraham responds that the text of the Talmud or of Maimonides' works upon which the objection is based is corrupt and must be corrected, and in certain cases he even concedes the validity of the difficulty — though in most instances he shows that Maimonides relied on the Talmud or the Geonim, and that it is against them that the objection is really directed. Against many other objections, however, he says that they are groundless and embarrassing, betraying a lack of expertise or thoroughness, going so far as to accuse: "The inclination to object has introduced confusion into your reasoning, and therefore it escaped you... and it would never have occurred to me to suspect you of an inclination to object, were it not that this is clear and evident." To the remark about the Guide for the Perplexed, he responds that such works "were made only for those skilled in them, and to the eyes of the many the matters are sealed and closed" — and therefore it would be better for Rabbi Daniel to refrain from engaging with them.

In the book Milhamot HaShem, Rabbi Abraham ben Maimonides recounts that some years later Rabbi Joseph ibn Aknin sent him a commentary on Ecclesiastes composed by Rabbi Daniel, which contained improper remarks against Maimonides and the Geonim under cover of anonymity. Rabbi Joseph and his associates asked Rabbi Abraham ben Maimonides to place Rabbi Daniel under a ban of excommunication, but he refrained from doing so on the grounds that it is not fitting to excommunicate one's adversary in a dispute, and that doing so could bring about a desecration of God's name. Maimonides' admirers subsequently turned to the Exilarch, Rabbi David of Mosul, who issued a decree of excommunication against him — following which Rabbi Daniel ultimately retracted his position and expressed remorse over his dispute with Maimonides. The reasons for his retraction are not entirely clear, but they may have stemmed from social pressure or from a desire to preserve communal unity.

=== His Legacy ===
Although he ended his life in compromise, the dispute between Rabbi Daniel and Maimonides had a profound impact on the Torah world. It raised fundamental questions about the relationship between tradition and philosophy, and about the boundaries of Torah interpretation. The dispute stirred deep theoretical discussion on these matters and influenced many generations of Torah scholars.

== See also ==
- Maimonidean controversy
