= Sar Shalom ben Moses =

Egyptian Jewish leader (d. 1204)

Personal life
- Born: Sar Shalom ben Moses ha-Levi; Yaḥyā Abū Zikrī Egypt
- Died: 1204 Fustat, Ayyubid Egypt
- Parent: Moses ben Netanel ha-Levi (father)

Religious life
- Religion: Judaism

Sar Shalom ben Moses HaLevi (Hebrew: שר שלום בן משה הלוי, Arabic: يحيى أبو زكري Yaḥyā Abū Zikrī; d. 1204), also called Zutta, was the last of the Egyptian geonim originating from the Palestinian Gaonate. He controversially held office in Fustat as the nagid of the Egyptian community from 1170 to 1171 and again from around 1173 to 1195, during which he was excommunicated several times by Maimonides for tax farming.

== Biography ==
Born in Egypt, his father Moses styled himself as Gaon and was a member of the Mishpachat Ha-Shishi, the "Family of the Sixth". He served as a diplomat and possibly the physician for the Fatimid court, whom he developed a close relationship with. In 1170, he succeeded his brother Nethanel ben Moses HaLevi as Nagid. Following the collapse of the Fatimid caliphate, he was disposed from this position by the Ayyubids when they came to power in 1171. He was replaced by Maimonides, who had a close relationship to the Ayyubid family, serving as their court physician. However, only two years later, in 1173, Sar Shalom regained his post and held it until at least 1195. His tenure is considered to be immensely controversial and political, as described by Megillat Zutta, written in 1197. The work recounts and criticizes the tenure of Sar Shalom, and celebrates the reinstatement of Maimonides’s as Nagid in 1195. The author, Abraham bar Hillel, accuses Sar Shalom and his father of having gained the headship of the Jews by corrupt means, including winning the favour of the government by farming taxes via local leaders and informing on fellow Jews. Additionally, the author describes Sar Shalom (who he calls Zuta, meaning "little one") as a "despotic ignoramus" blinded by his aristocratic pedigree.

Letters and documents found in the Fustat Genizah provide additional details of how Sar Shalom attempted to appoint tax-farming governors in El Mahalla, Alexandria, and Bilbeis. Maimonides also confirms these accusations in his commentary on Pirkei Avot 6:4 (there is no commentary from Rambam on chapter 6) where, in response to these events, he interpolated a passage forbidding the collection of taxes by religious leaders. Many of the local Egyptian governors resisted Sar Shalom's efforts to force them to farm taxes and from 1169 to 1170, the Jewish community of Alexandria banned anyone who recognized Sar Shalom's authority and officially excommunicated him. However, Maimonides overruled the ban in fear that it would lead to a greater divide among the community. It was also during this time that many influential Jews lobbied the Ayyubids to dispose of Sar Shalom. After the Jewish governor of El Mahalla, Perahya ben Joseph, refused to help Sar Shalom farm taxes, Sar Shalom threatened to appoint his own governor. However Perahya's supporters threatened to excommunicate anyone who recognized or cooperated with Sar Shalom's appointee. To this, Maimonides ruled in a responsum that the excommunication was binding on those who had accepted it. This prevented Sar Shalom from replacing Peraḥya.

In 1187, Maimonides threatened to excommunicate anyone who recognized or interacted with Sar Shalom's governors. The ban further excommunicated anyone who granted authority to perform marriages and divorces to rabbis who were not experts on marriage and divorce law (a direct blow against Sar Shalom). Since the Nagid possessed the exclusive power of appointing judges, the ban was representative of the public rejection of Sar Shalom's authority. Maimonides reiterated the ruling once he assumed the office of Nagid in 1195. After the death of both Sar Shalom and Maimonides in 1204, Maimonides' son Abraham Maimonides was appointed as Nagid in 1205; this led to members of Sar Shalom’s family attempting to undermine his power by falsely claiming that he attempted to Islamize synagogue liturgy.

Jewish titles
| Preceded by Netanel ben Moses ha-Levi | Palestinian Gaon in Fustat; Sar Shalom ben Moses c.1170–1195 | Succeeded by Office defunct |
