= Maimonides Heritage Center =

- מרכז מורשת הרמב"ם
- Established: 15 January 2006 (approx.)
- Location: Tomb of Maimonides, Tiberias, Israel
- Coordinates: 32.7901°N 35.5376°E
- Type: Heritage center
- Director: Rabbi Yamin Levy
- Website: mhcisrael.org

The Maimonides Heritage Center (MHC) (Hebrew: מרכז מורשת הרמב"ם) is an educational and cultural non-profit organization in the Israeli city of Tiberias. Established in 2003 by Rabbi Yamin Levy, it works to disseminate the teachings and worldview of Maimonides to the general public. The main attraction is the Setton Family Hospitality Center, a small museum and study hall.

== Establishment ==
In 2003, Rabbi Yamin Levy and a group of friends visited Maimonides' tomb (kever), and discovered a dilapidated building alongside. This building had become a drug hangout, garbage dump, and was full of graffiti. The group decided that this was inappropriate next to the grave of a scholar like Maimonides, and made plans to create a center of study, tourism, and education, worthy of Maimonides' legacy. The building was purchased, and in 2009, after extensive renovations, the Setton Family Hospitality Center opened to the public.

== Setton Family Hospitality Center ==
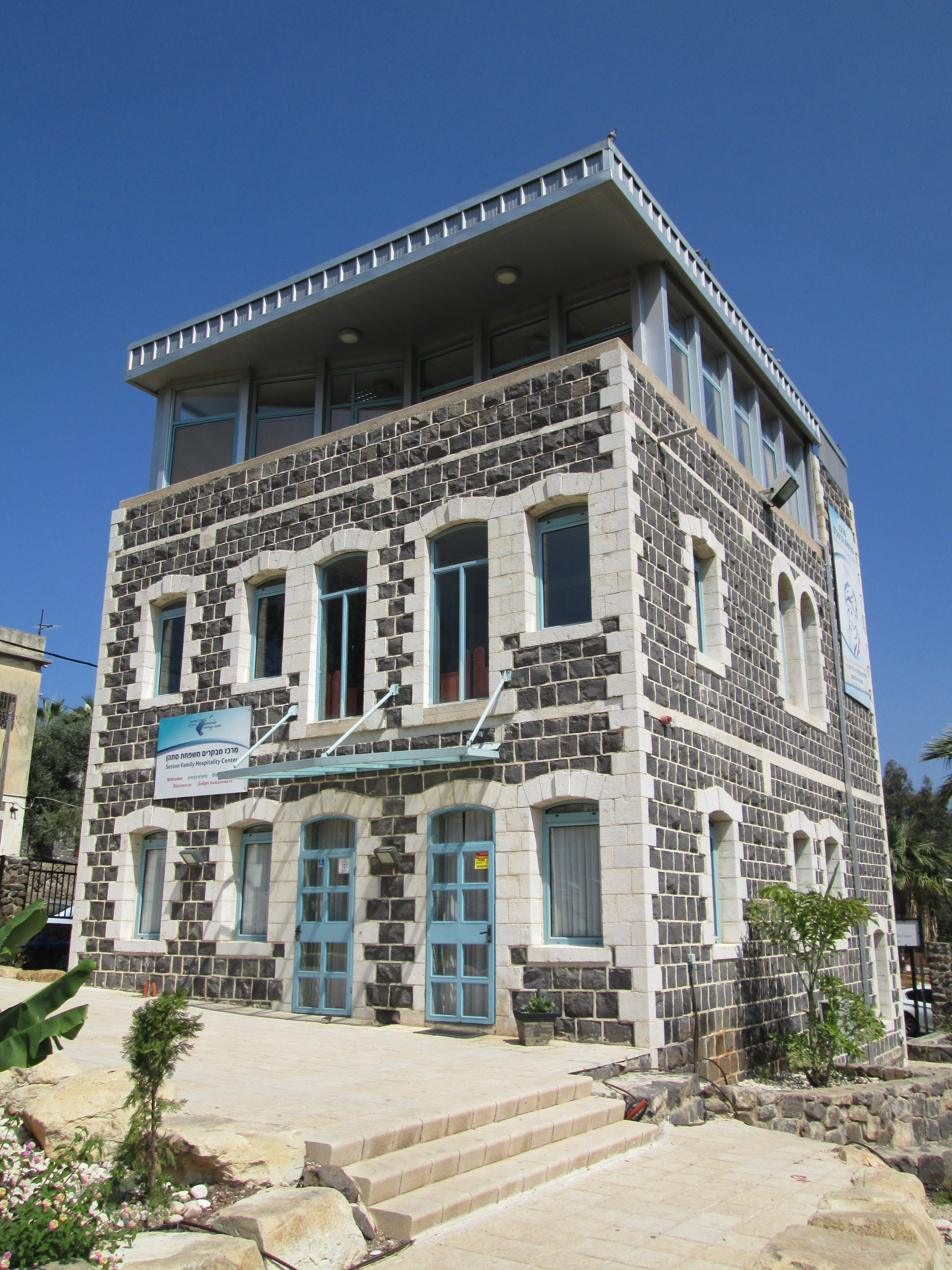
Front view of the Setton Family Hospitality Center.

The Setton Family Hospitality Center is a three-story basalt building located near Maimonides' grave. The ground floor is used as a museum, containing information on Maimonides' teachings and life and collections of his writings. This includes a copy of his handwritten diagram of the Second Temple. There is also a small video room, where visitors are invited to watch a short video about Maimonides. The second floor contains a study hall (beit midrash) and library. A variety of classes take place there. The third floor is used for group presentations and special programs.

Programs for groups include special presentations, craft activities, and challenges for children.

== Annual conference ==
Since 2009, the Maimonides Heritage Center has held an annual 3-day conference during the week of the anniversary of Maimonides' death on the Hebrew calendar. It is based at the Hof Guy hotel in Tiberias.

== See also ==
- Maimonides
- Tiberias
