= Lycée Maïmonide =

International school in Casablanca, Morocco

Coordinates: 33.59588289°N 7.63336183°W

Ecole Maïmonide is a French international secondary school in Casablanca, Morocco. A part of the AEFE school network, it serves the levels collège and lycée (junior and senior high school).
