= Nagid =

Hebrew term meaning a prince or leader

Nagid (Hebrew: נגיד pronounced [naˈgid]) is a Hebrew term meaning a prince or leader. This title was often applied to the religious leader in Sephardic communities of the Middle Ages. In Egypt, the Jewish Nagid was appointed over all the Jews living under the dominion of the king of Egypt; he was invested with all the power of a king and could punish and imprison those who acted in opposition to his decrees; his duty was also to appoint the dayyanim (judges of the rabbinic court) in every city.

According to Muslim scholars, the role of the Nagid (or Ra’īs) was to represent the Rabbanite majority, but also to represent the minority groups of the Karaites and Samaritans as well. Accordingly, his function was to "join the Jews together and to prevent their separation," mainly by serving them as legal authority in accordance with their laws and customs.

In Arab countries, the Shaykh al-Yahud (شيخ اليهود 'sheikh of the Jews') was a Jewish community leader who would act as a liaison between Jewish communities and Muslim authorities, as in Fes before French colonization.

Among the individuals bearing this title are the following (Dates refer to lifespan, not when this title was held.):

- Samuel ibn Naghrillah (Shmuel Ha-Naggid), 993-1056 CE
- Sa'adya ben Mevorakh, 999-?
- David ben Daniel, fl. 1078-1094
- Joseph ibn Naghrela (Yosef Ha-Naggid), 1035-1066
- Yehudah "Judah" ben Sa'adya, 1020-1080
- Abū 'l-Faḍl Mevorakh ben Saʿadya, 1040-1111
- Nethan'el ben Mevorakh, 1098-c. 1160
- Moses ben Mevorakh, fl. 1110-c.1141
- Nethanel ben Moses Ha-Levi, fl. 1160-1170
- Sar Shalom ben Moses, ?-1204
- Maimonides, 1138-1204
- Abraham ben Moses ben Maimon, 1186-1237
- David HaNagid, 1222-1300
- Avraham HaNagid, c. 1246–c. 1316
- Yehoshua Hanagid, 1310-1355
- David ben Joshua Maimuni, 1335?-1415?

== See also ==
- Exilarch
- Nasi (Hebrew title)
- Hakham Bashi
- Chief Rabbi
