= Maimonides Synagogue =

Former synagogue in Cairo, Egypt

- Hebrew: בית כנסת הרמב"ם; Arabic: كنيس ابن ميمون
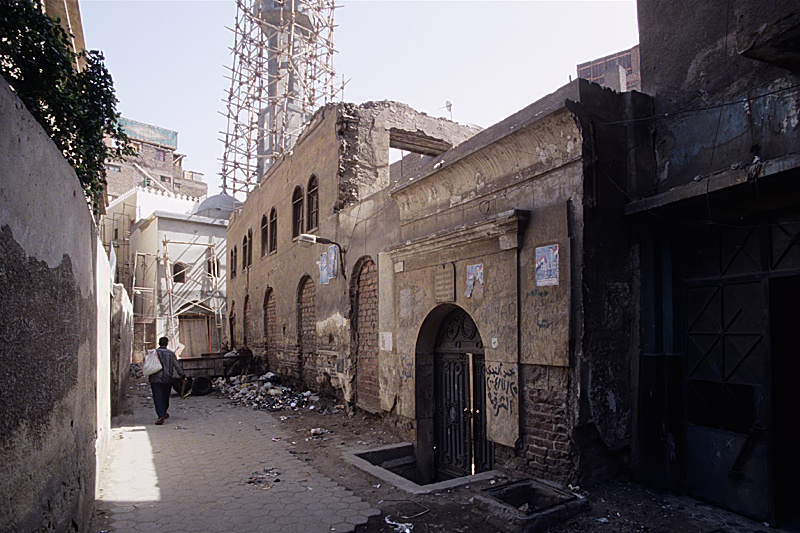
- The façade of the former synagogue in 2006, before its 2010 renovation

- Location of the former synagogue, relative to the Nile Delta

Religion
- Affiliation: Judaism (former)
- Ecclesiastical or organizational status: Synagogue
- Status: Closed

Location
- Location: el-Muski, Cairo
- Country: Egypt
- Interactive map of Maimonides Synagogue
- Coordinates: 30°03′03″N 31°15′30″E

Architecture
- Type: Synagogue architecture
- Established: 10th century
- Completed: 19th century (current building)
- Site area: 600 m^{2} (6,500 sq ft)

The Maimonides Synagogue (Hebrew: בית כנסת הרמב"ם, romanized: Bet Knesset ha-Rambam; Arabic: كنيس ابن ميمون), also known as the Rav Moshe Synagogue or the Ibn Maïmoun Synagogue, is an historic former Jewish synagogue, located in the Jewish quarter, el-Muski, in Cairo, Egypt.

A synagogue has existed at the site since the 10th century and was subsequently named after the famous Jewish philosopher, rabbi and physician Maimonides, after his arrival there in around 1168. It is believed that Maimonides' original tomb is contained within the building. In March 2010, the Egyptian government completed the restoration of the current building which dates from the late 19th century.

== History ==
=== Early history ===
A synagogue has existed at the site from around two centuries before Maimonides emigrated to Egypt in around 1168, following his exile from Córdoba, Spain at the hands of the Almohads. The Almohads conquered Córdoba in 1148 and threatened the Jewish community with the choice of conversion to Islam, death, or exile. Maimonides' family, along with most other Jews, chose exile. After spending ten years in southern Spain, they moved to Morocco and then eventually settled in Fustat, Egypt in around 1168. In Egypt, he gained widespread recognition and became a court physician to Qadi al-Fadil, secretary to Saladin. Maimonides studied and worked in a yeshiva attached to the small synagogue. The synagogue and yeshiva are located in Harat al-Yahud, the Jewish quarter of medieval Cairo, and can only be reached on foot. (Note: In the time of Maimonides, 97% of the inhabitants of Harat al-Yahud were Jews.)

After his death in Fustat on December 12, 1204, it is believed that he was buried for a short while at the synagogue before being reinterred in Tiberias. According to tradition, his bones were placed for a week in a small shrine where he used to study and to heal strangers. (Some believe his bones never left Egypt.)

=== 19th and 20th centuries ===
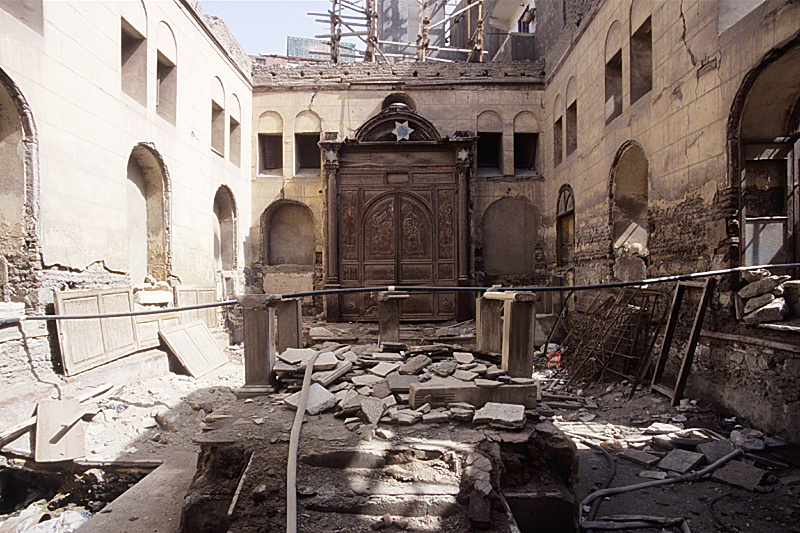
Inside of the synagogue, before its 2010 renovation

In the 19th century, another synagogue was built on the site and named in his honor.

The situation of Egypt's Jews became increasingly precarious in the middle of the 20th century. Rising Arab nationalism, together with increased tensions between Jews and Arabs following the 1948 Arab–Israeli War and later, the Lavon Affair that led to the 1956 Suez War, led to government restrictions on foreign economic activity, which deeply impacted Egypt's Jewish community. Several thousand Jewish residents were expelled from the country following the 1956 war and thousands more fled the hostile social and economic conditions. Egypt's Jewish population eventually dropped from 80,000 to less than 100.

With only about 30 Jews (mostly elderly women) left in Cairo, the synagogue was closed, and almost collapsed due to underground water and earthquakes. The ceiling of the building collapsed in 1992, and the debris was left on the floor. The slum area in which synagogue was located was littered with garbage. The head of the Supreme Council of Antiquities, Zahi Hawass, said that the synagogue was used for the last time in 1960, and then was allowed to "crumble". Although it was declared an antiquity in 1986, the condition of the medieval synagogue had deteriorated further by 2005. A holy ark with a broken door was located in the small courtyard, covered with debris. The ark's Star of David was still present, but was hanging on only by a thread.

=== 21st century restoration ===
In June 2009, the Egyptian government began a year-long restoration project, unveiled in August 2009 by their head of antiquities Zahi Hawass. The $2 million, 18-month restoration project of the Rav Moshe synagogue, in an area of Cairo once called "the neighborhood of the Jews," was financed by the Egyptian government. The restoration work was finished in March 2010. Along with Maimonides tomb, the synagogue contains two areas that were for prayer and rituals, one of which included a section for women.

Among the synagogue's treasures is a Bible that allegedly was written by Maimonides himself. Former Israeli ambassador to Egypt, Zvi Mazel, said "the results were spectacular; the original colors were restored almost perfectly".

==== Inauguration controversy ====
As restoration work was nearing completion, the Egyptian authorities agreed that the small Jewish community of Cairo would organize a dedication ceremony on March 7, 2010. The official inauguration was planned for the middle of March. The dedication ceremony was closed to media but attendees said it was an emotional event, especially for the Egyptian-Jewish families invited, many of whom now live in Europe. About 150 people attended, none of whom were Egyptian government officials.

On March 14, 2010, the official inauguration ceremony was canceled. Zahi Hawass explained that the cancellation was due to media reports of Jews "dancing and drinking alcohol in the synagogue" during the private March 7 dedication, which Hawass described as a "provocation to the feelings of hundreds of millions of Muslims in Egypt and around the world". Hawass later added that the decision to scrap the ceremony was made at "a time when Muslim holy sites in occupied Palestine face assaults from Israeli occupation forces and settlers". Later still, he characterized the cancellation of the ceremony as a "strong slap in the face" to "the Zionist enemy."

== Legends and tradition ==
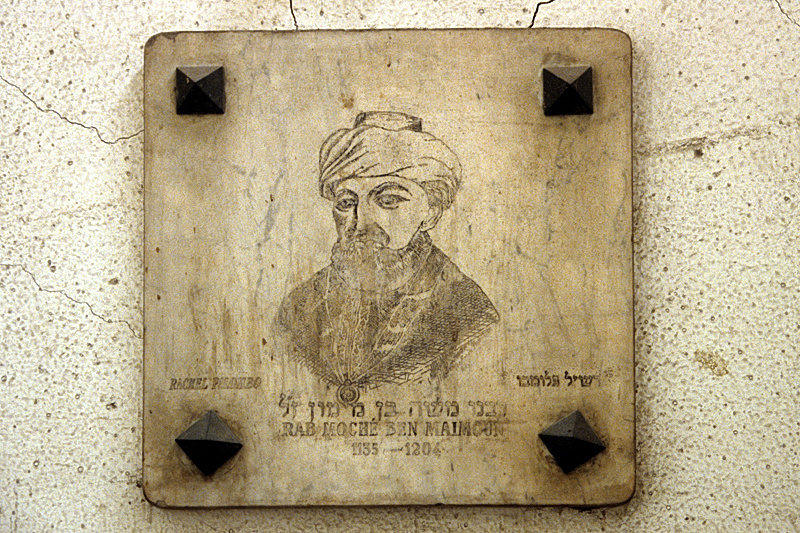
Slab in the synagogue showing Moses Maimonides

According to a legend told by Joseph ben Isaac Sambari, (c.1640 – 1703), a Jewish-Egyptian chronicler of the 17th century, the people who carried the body of Maimonides to the Sea of Galilee for permanent burial mistakenly left one of his toes behind in the synagogue, which at that time was called the synagogue of Western (Tunisian) Jews. Later, one of the people who carried the body had a dream, in which a wise man of Egypt reminded him about the forgotten toe. The toe was later recovered and buried next to the body.

The synagogue and accompanying yeshiva have traditionally been considered to have miraculous healing powers. Until the Egyptian government forbade the practice in 1948, the synagogue was used as a place of healing by the local Jewish community. The ailing person was left to sleep in the special underground room in the hope that the sufferer would dream of Maimonides and get better.

== See also ==
- History of the Jews in Egypt
- Synagogues in Cairo
- List of synagogues in Egypt
