= Abraham bar Hillel =

Egyptian-Hebrew Poet

Abraham bar Hillel (Hebrew: אברהם בר הלל; fl. late 12th century) was an Egyptian Hebrew-language poet whose works were discovered in 1896 in the Cairo Geniza. He wrote the Megillah Zutta ('The Scroll of Zuta') in elegant rimed prose, narrating the downfall of a contemporary Egyptian Jewish leader. As a prologue and an epilogue, he added poems which show their author to have been a skilful versifier. This work was completed in 1176.
