= Tomb of Maimonides =

Rebuilt Jewish holy site in Israel

Coordinates: 32.79°N 35.54°E

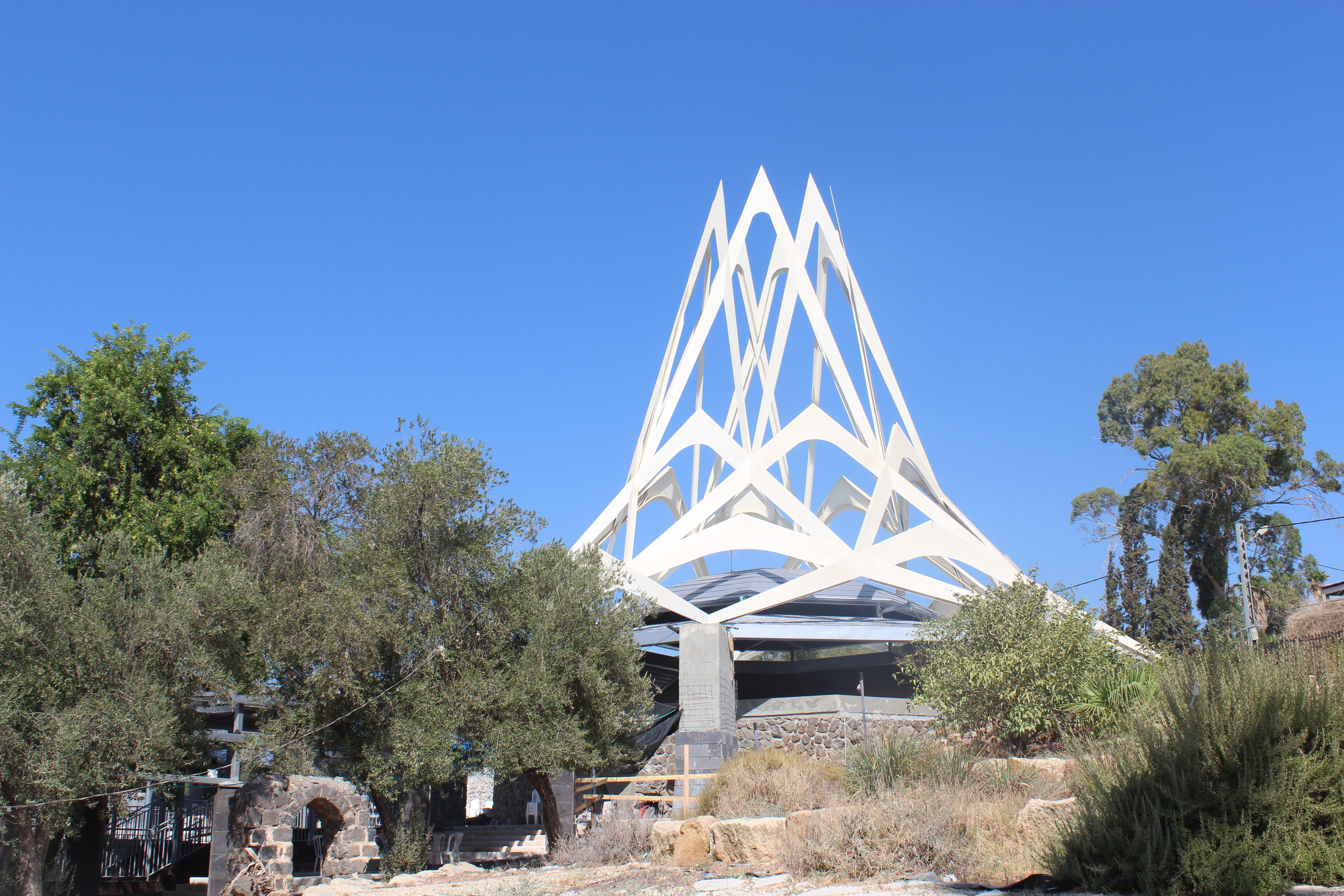
Tomb of Maimonides (2017)

According to Jewish tradition, the Tomb of Maimonides (Hebrew: קבר הרמב"ם Kever ha-Rambam) is located in Tiberias, Israel. Although Maimonides, a Sephardic Jew, died in Fustat, Egypt, on 12 December 1204, it is believed that he was only briefly buried in Fustat before being reinterred in Tiberias. Others say his tomb is in Musky, Cairo. Owing to his recognition as a prominent Jewish philosopher, his tomb is one of Israel's most important Jewish pilgrimage sites and is also among Tiberias' most visited tourist attractions. The site also serves as the burial place of Yohanan ben Zakkai, a prominent Tanna of the Second Temple period; and Isaiah Horowitz, a prominent Jewish mystic of the 16th/17th century. In 2012, Israeli Prime Minister Benjamin Netanyahu declared it a national heritage site.

== Legendary burial ==
Many legends are told about the burial of Maimonides. According to Jewish tradition, his bones were placed for a week in a small shrine where he used to study and to heal strangers. While some believe his bones never left Egypt, others believe that the permanent place of his burial was on the western shore of the Sea of Galilee, where Tiberias is now sited. One legend has it that a band of Bedouins – who were about to attack the funeral cortège as it marched through the desert – "hung their heads in shame" after realizing it was the funeral of the man who had attended themselves and their families for free, and instead formed a protective guard for the procession as it made its way to Israel.

Another legend was told by Joseph ben Isaac Sambari, a Jewish-Egyptian chronicler of the seventeenth century, who lived probably between 1640 and 1703. In one of his books Sambari mentioned an oral anecdote about the people who carried his body to the Sea of Galilee for permanent burial mistakenly leaving one of his toes behind in the Maimonides Synagogue, which at that time was called the synagogue of Western (Tunisian) Jews. Later one of the people who carried the body had a dream, in which a wise man of Egypt reminded him about the forgotten toe. The toe was recovered and buried next to the body.

== Site of the tomb ==
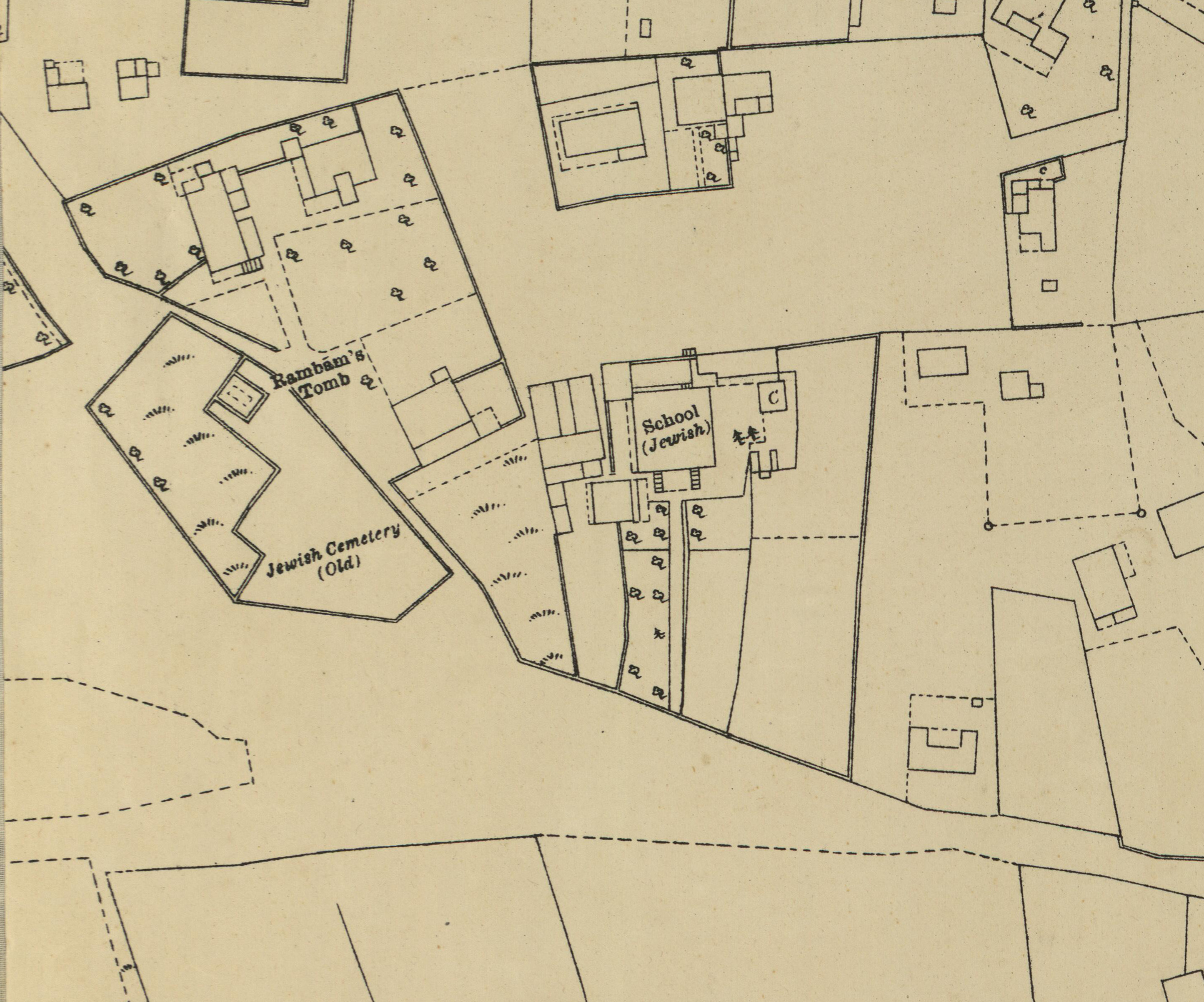
"Tomb of Rambam", 1930s Survey of Palestine map of Tiberias

The earliest source for the claim that Maimonides is buried in Tiberias is Al-Qifti, and this view is corroborated by a wide variety of 13th–15th century chronicles. The earliest source to introduce doubt was Samuel Shullam, who wrote "He was buried in Tiberias, or, as some say, he was buried with the Patriarchs in Hebron." Most modern scholars agree that Maimonides was buried in Tiberias, though Armand Kaminka argued that his body never left Egypt.

Rabbi Ya'akov Moshe Toledano originally purchased the land around the tomb in 1920. As a result, the tomb was transferred to Jewish ownership.

== Notable Rabbis buried here ==
- Moses Ben Maimon
- Maimon Ben Joseph
- Yohanan Ben Zakkai
- Isaiah Horowitz
- El'azar Ben Arach
- Yehoshua Ben Hannanyah
- Eliezer Ben Hyrcanus
- Rav Ami
- Rav Ashi
