= Abraham Maimonides =

Egyptian rabbi (1186–1237)

Abraham Maimonides (Hebrew: אברהם בן רמב"ם; also known as Rabbeinu Avraham ben ha-Rambam, Avraham Maimuni, and Abraham ben Moses ben Maimon; 13 June 1186 – 7 December 1237) was a Jewish philosopher and leader of Egyptian Jewry, and the son of Maimonides. Following his father's death, he succeeded him as nagid of the Egyptian Jewish community, and the office subsequently remained hereditary until the end of the 14th century.

Abraham introduced a number of new ritual practices influenced by Muslim Sufis, which aroused strong opposition. He also defended his father's works in several publications and composed an encyclopaedic work on Judaism entitled Kifayat al-Abidin ("Comprehensive Guide for the Servants of God").

== Biography ==
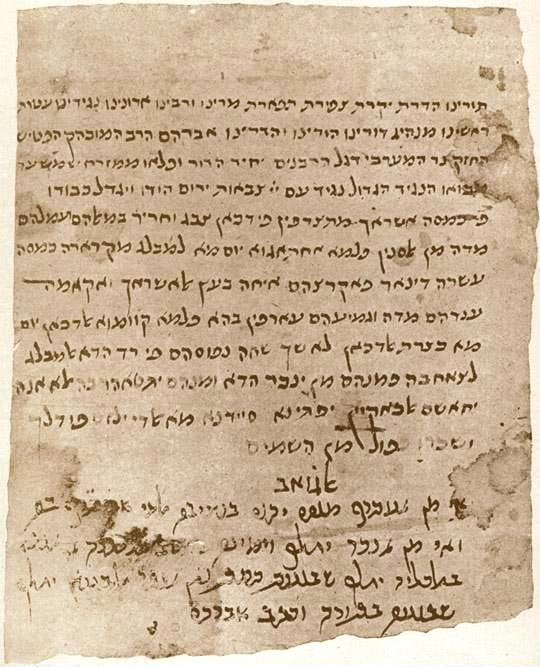
Cairo Genizah fragment by Abraham ibn Maymun

Avraham was born in Fustat in the Ayyubid-ruled Egypt near Cairo when his father was fifty-one years old. The boy was "modest, highly refined and unusually good natured"; he was also noted for his brilliant intellect and even while a youth became known as a great scholar. When his father died in 1204 at the age of sixty-nine, Avraham was recognised as the greatest scholar in his community. Thus, he succeeded Rambam as Nagid (head of the Egyptian Jews), as well as in the office of court physician, at the age of only eighteen. (The office of nagid was held by the Maimonides family for four successive generations until the end of the 14th century). After his appointment, the family of Sar Shalom ben Moses (a bitter rival of Maimonides) attempted to undermine his power by claiming that he attempted to Islamize the synagogue liturgy.

Avraham greatly honored the memory of his father, and defended his writings and works against all critics. Due to his influence, a large Egyptian Karaite community became Rabbinical Jews. Yemenite Jews are known to have maintained contact with Avraham while he served as head of the Jewish community in Egypt, sending to him some thirteen questions relating to halakha, to which questions he replied in his own succinct way.

== Works ==
Abraham's best-known work is his Milhamoth ha-Shem ("The Book of the Wars for God"), in which he answers the critics of his father's philosophical doctrines expressed in The Guide for the Perplexed. He had initially avoided entering the controversy over his father's writings, however, when he heard of the alleged burning of his father's books in Montpellier in 1235, he compiled the Milhamot HaShem, which he addressed to the Hachmei Provence. His principal work is entitled "A Comprehensive Guide for the Servants of God" (Judeo-Arabic: כתאב כפיא אלעאבדין, romanized: Kitāb Kifāyah al-`Ābidīn). From the extant surviving portion it is conjectured that Maimuni's treatise was three times as long as his father's Guide for the Perplexed. In the book, Maimuni evinces a great appreciation of and affinity for Sufism (Islamic mysticism). Followers of his path continued to foster a Jewish-Sufi form of pietism for at least a century, and he is rightly considered the founder of this pietistic school.

His other works include an exegesis on the Torah, of which only his commentaries on Genesis and Exodus are now extant, as well as commentaries on parts of his father's Mishneh Torah and on various tractates of the Talmud. He also wrote a work on Halakha (Jewish law), combined with philosophy and ethics (also in Judeo-Arabic, and arranged after his father's Mishneh Torah), as well as a book of Questions & Responsa, more commonly known as Sefer Birkat Avraham. It was written in response to criticism by Daniel HaBavli. His "Discourse on the Sayings of the Rabbis"—discussing aggadah—is often quoted.

He also authored various medical works.
