= Maimonides =

Medieval Jewish philosopher (1135/1138–1204)

Rabbi Moses ben Maimon
- מֹשֶׁה בֶּן־מַיְמוֹן
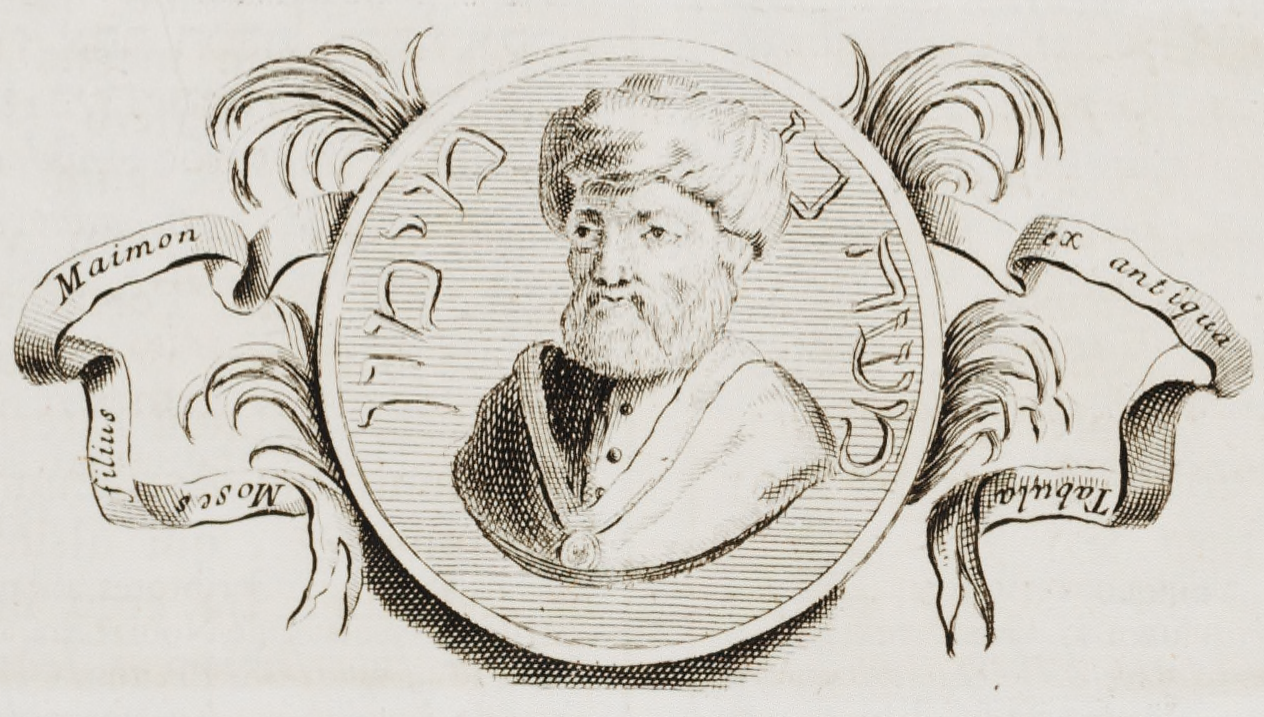
- A posthumous engraving in Thesaurus Antiquitatum Sacrarum, from which all modern portraits of Maimonides are derived, c. 1744
- Born: 30 March or 6 April 1135, or 28 March or 4 April 1138; Córdoba, Almoravid dynasty (now Spain)
- Died: 12 December 1204 (aged 66–69); Fustat, Ayyubid Sultanate (now Egypt)
- Resting place: Tomb of Maimonides
- Other name: Rambam (רמב״ם)
- Occupations: Philosopher; physician
- Children: Abraham Maimonides (son)
- Father: Maimon ben Joseph

Philosophical work
- Era: Medieval philosophy: 12th-century philosophy
- Region: Middle Eastern philosophy: Jewish philosophy
- School: Aristotelianism
- Language: Arabic; Hebrew
- Main interests: Judaic theology, halakha, astronomy, medicine
- Notable works: Commentary on the Mishnah (1168); Mishneh Torah (1170–1180); The Guide for the Perplexed (1185–1190)
- Notable ideas: Maimonides' rule, golden mean, thirteen principles of faith

Moses ben Maimon (Note: Hebrew: מֹשֶׁה בֶּן־מַיְמוֹן Mōše ben Maymōn; Arabic: موسى بن ميمون Mūsā ibn Maymūn) (died 12 December 1204), commonly known as Maimonides (Note: /maɪˈmɒnɪdiːz/ my-MON-ih-deez (Greek: Μωυσής Μαϊμωνίδης Mōusḗs Maïmōnídēs; Latin: Moses Maimonides)) and also referred to by the Hebrew acronym Rambam, (Note: /ˌrɑːmˈbɑːm/; Hebrew: רמב״ם (from Rabbēnū Mōše ben Maymōn, lit. 'Our Rabbi Moses, son of Maimon')) was a Sephardic Jewish rabbi who is widely acknowledged as one of the most prolific and influential Torah scholars of the Middle Ages.

Originally from Córdoba, where he was born on Passover Eve of 1135 or 1138, (Note: 30 March or 6 April 1135, or 28 March or 4 April 1138) (Note: The date of 1138 of the Common Era is the date of birth given by Maimonides himself, in the very last chapter and comment made by Maimonides in his Commentary of the Mishnah, and where he writes: "I began to write this composition when I was twenty-three years old, and I completed it in Egypt while I was aged thirty, which year is the 1,479th year of the Seleucid era (1168 CE).") his family was exiled from Muslim-ruled Spain shortly after the Almohad Caliphate conquered the Almoravid dynasty in 1148. Over the next two decades, Maimonides resided in Fez, Acre, Jerusalem, Alexandria, and Cairo before settling in Fustat between 1168 and 1171. During this period, he advanced his vocations and became renowned for his achievements as an astronomer, philosopher, and physician—even being appointed to serve as personal physician to Saladin of the Ayyubid Sultanate.

Most contemporary Jews as far as Iraq and Yemen acclaimed Maimonides' writings on halakha and Jewish ethics. While he rose to lead the Jewish community in Egypt, he also had many loud critics, particularly in Spain. He continued to live in Fustat until his death in 1204 and is said to have been buried in Tiberias. The Tomb of Maimonides in Tiberias holds importance as a Jewish pilgrimage site.

To date, Maimonides is recognized as one of the foremost rabbinic decisors and his copious work comprises a cornerstone of Jewish scholarship. His fourteen-volume Mishneh Torah still carries significant canonical authority in Judaism as a codification of halakha, as do his thirteen principles of faith. Maimonides' era is considered by many to mark the end of the Jewish Golden Age in Spain, owing to the ubiquitous persecution of his family and the Sephardic Jewish community in general. Others assert that it lasted until the Christian Reconquista concluded in the 15th century.

Aside from being revered by Jewish historians, Maimonides features very prominently in the history of Islamic science. Influenced by Aristotle, al-Farabi, ibn Sina, and his contemporary ibn Rushd, his work as a polymath contributed to the Islamic Golden Age and was regarded highly in many parts of the Muslim world.

== Name ==
Maimonides' Hebrew name was Moses son of Rabbi Maimon the Spaniard (Hebrew: מֹשֶׁה בֵּרַבִּי מַיְמוֹן הַסְּפָרדִּי, romanized: Mōše bēRabbî Maymōn has-Səfārdî). (Note: He usually left off "the Spaniard" and he sometimes added זצ״ל, short for "[let] mention of the righteous one bring a blessing." At the end of his commentary to the Mishna, he gives a fuller lineage: אני משה ברבי מימון הדיין ברבי יוסף החכם ברבי יצחק הדיין ברבי יוסף הדיין ברבי עובדיהו הדיין ברבי שלמה הרב ברבי עובדיהו הדיין זכר קדושים לברכה, "I am Moshe son of Rabbi Maimon the Judge, son of Rabbi Joseph the Wise, son of Rabbi Isaac the Judge, son of Rabbi Joseph the Judge, son of Rabbi Obadiah the Judge, son of Rabbi Solomon the Teacher, son of Rabbi Obadiah the Judge; [let] mention of the holy ones bring a blessing.") In Medieval Hebrew, he was usually called ר״ם (Ram), which is short for "our Rabbi Moshe"; he is oftentimes referred to as רמב״ם (Rambam), which is short for "our Rabbi, Moshe son of Maimon".

His Arabic name was Abū ʿImrān Mūsā bin Maimūn bin ʿUbaydallāh al-Qurṭubī (Arabic: أَبُو عِمْرَان مُوسَى بْن مَيْمُون بْن عُبَيْد ٱللّٰه ٱلْقُرْطُبِيّ, Moses "father of Amram" (Note: Medieval Jews named Moses received the Arabic nickname abu Imran, in which the word abu has been inverted from its original sense of "father" to reference the biblical Moses' father Amram. Similarly, Jews named Isaac were known as abu Ibrahim, meaning: "son of Abraham". For more on the Jewish system of biblical nicknames, see Kunya.) son of Maymun, son of Obadiah the Cordoban), (Note: Ubaydallah is to be treated as Maimonides' surname; his grandfather was named Joseph. It is not always included in either Arabic or Hebrew versions of Maimonides' name. Various Hebrew manuscripts render ben Ovadyahu and ben Eved-Elohim ("descended/son of Obadiah"), but also Eved-Elohim, implying only "Moses son of Maimon, the servant of God" (cf. Josh. 1:13–15) and Latin versions follow, rendering servus dei. See: Bar-Sela A, Hoff HE, Faris E, Maimonides M (1964). "Moses Maimonides' Two Treatises on the Regimen of Health: Fi Tadbir al-Sihhah and Maqalah fi Bayan Ba'd al-A'rad wa-al-Jawab 'anha". Transactions of the American Philosophical Society. 54 (4). JSTOR: 3. doi:10.2307/1005935. ISSN 0065-9746. JSTOR 1005935.) or oftentimes more simply, as Moses son of Maymun (موسى بن ميمون).

In Greek, the Hebrew ben ('son of') becomes the patronymic suffix -ίδης (-ides), forming Μωυσής Μαϊμωνίδης "Mōusēs Maimōnidēs".

He is sometimes known as "The Great Eagle" (Hebrew: הנשר הגדול, romanized: haNesher haGadol).

== Biography ==
=== Early life ===
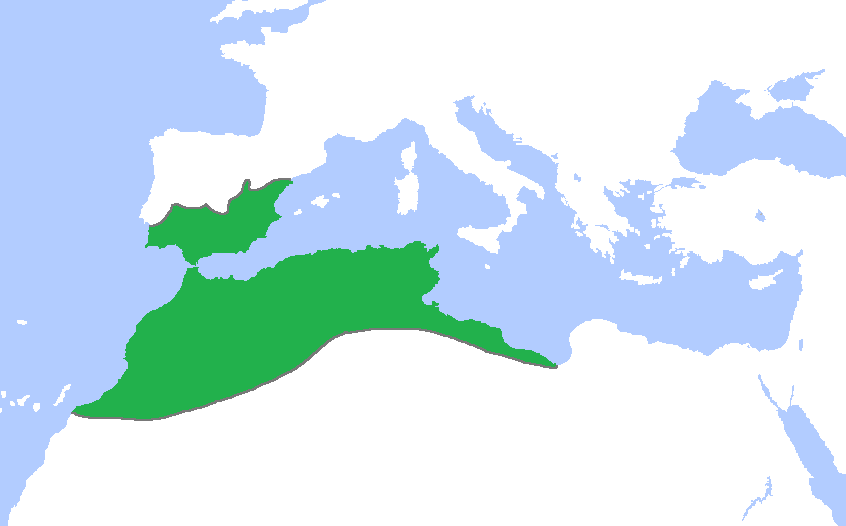
The dominion of the Almohad Caliphate at its greatest extent, c. 1200

Maimonides was born 1138 (or 1135) in Córdoba in the Muslim-ruled Almoravid dynasty, at the end of the Golden Age of Jewish culture in Spain after the first centuries of Muslim rule. His father, Maimon ben Joseph, was a dayyan or rabbinic judge.

Maimonides studied Torah under his father, who had studied under Joseph ibn Migash, a student of Isaac Alfasi. At an early age, Maimonides developed an interest in contemporary science and philosophy. He read ancient Greek philosophy accessible via Arabic translations and was deeply immersed in the sciences and learning of Islamic culture.

=== Exile from Spain ===
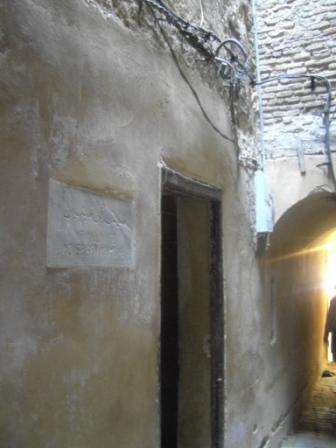
Maimonides' house in Fez, Morocco, according to local tradition. It is now occupied by the Dar al-Magana.

A Berber dynasty, the Almohads, conquered Córdoba in 1148 and abolished dhimmi status (i.e., state protection of non-Muslims) in some territories. The loss of this status forced Jewish and Christian communities to choose between conversion to Islam, martyrdom, or exile. Many Jews were forced to convert, but due to suspicion by the authorities of fake conversions, the new converts had to wear identifying clothing that set them apart.

Maimonides' family, along with many other Jews, chose exile. For the next ten years, Maimonides moved about in southern Spain and North Africa, eventually settling in Fas. Some say that his teacher in Fez was Yehuda Ha-Cohen Ibn Susan, until the latter was killed in 1165.

During this time, he composed his acclaimed commentary on the Mishnah during 1166–1168. (Note: Seder HaDoroth (year 4927) quotes Maimonides as saying that he began writing his commentary on the Mishna when he was 23 years old, and published it when he was 30. Because of the dispute about the date of Maimonides' birth, it is not clear which year the work was published.)

==== Sojourn to the Holy Land ====
Following this sojourn in Morocco, he lived in Acre with his father and brother, arriving on May 16, 1165. They lived there for five months. In October, he visited Jerusalem, where he prayed at the Temple Mount. He wrote that this day of visiting the Temple Mount was a day of holiness for him and his descendants. He then visited the Cave of the Patriarchs in Hebron.

==== Settlement in Egypt ====
He and his family settled in Fustat in Fatimid Caliphate-controlled Egypt by 1168. There is mention that Maimonides first settled in Alexandria, and moved to Fustat only in 1171. While in Cairo, he studied in a yeshiva attached to a small synagogue, which now bears his name.

Maimonides was soon instrumental in helping rescue Jews taken captive during the Christian Amalric of Jerusalem's siege of the southeastern Nile Delta town of Bilbeis. He sent five letters to the Jewish communities of Lower Egypt asking them to pool money together to pay the ransom. The money was collected and then given to two judges sent to the Kingdom of Jerusalem to negotiate with the Crusaders. The captives were eventually released.

==== Death of his brother David ====
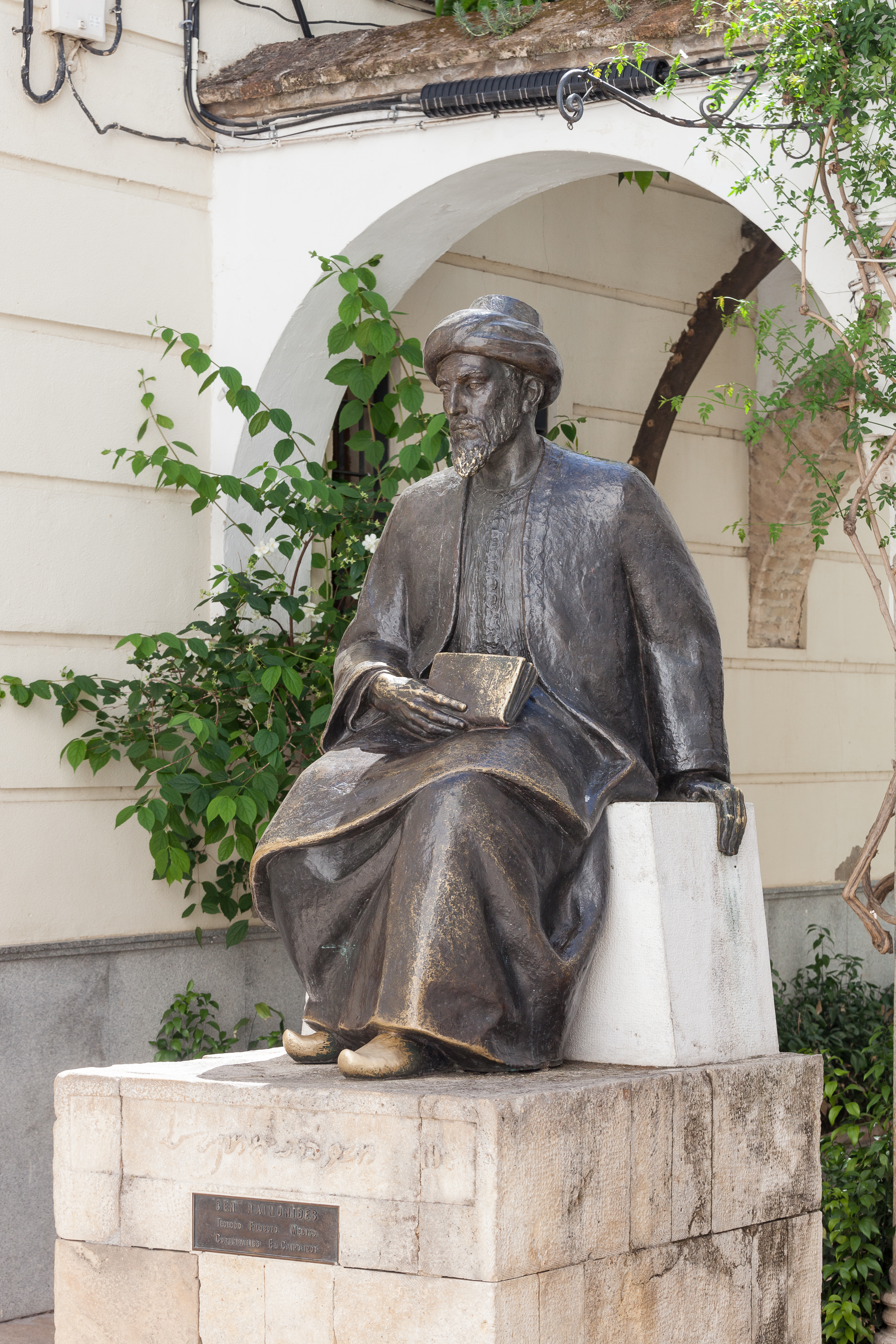
A monument to Maimonides in Córdoba

Following this success, the Maimonides family, hoping to increase their wealth, gave their savings to his brother, the youngest son David ben Maimon, a merchant. Maimonides directed his brother to procure goods only at the port of ʿAydhab along the Red Sea. After a long, arduous trip through the desert, David was unimpressed by the goods on offer there. Against his brother's wishes, David boarded a ship for India, since great wealth was to be found in the East. (Note: The "India Trade" (a term devised by the Arabist S.D. Goitein) was a highly lucrative business venture in which Jewish merchants from Egypt, the Mediterranean, and the Middle East imported and exported goods ranging from pepper to brass from various ports along the Malabar Coast between the 11th–13th centuries. For more info, see the "India Traders" chapter in Goitein, Letters of Medieval Jewish Traders, 1973 or Goitein, India Traders of the Middle Ages, 2008.) Before he could reach his destination, David drowned at sea sometime between 1169 and 1177. The death of his brother caused Maimonides to become sick with grief.

In a letter discovered in the Cairo Geniza, he wrote:

The greatest misfortune that has befallen me during my entire life—worse than anything else—was the demise of the saint, may his memory be blessed, who drowned in the Indian sea, carrying much money belonging to me, to him, and to others, and left with me a little daughter and a widow. On the day I received that terrible news I fell ill and remained in bed for about a year, suffering from a sore boil, fever, and depression, and was almost given up. About eight years have passed, but I am still mourning and unable to accept consolation. And how should I console myself? He grew up on my knees, he was my brother, [and] he was my student.

=== Leadership of Egypt's Jewish community ===
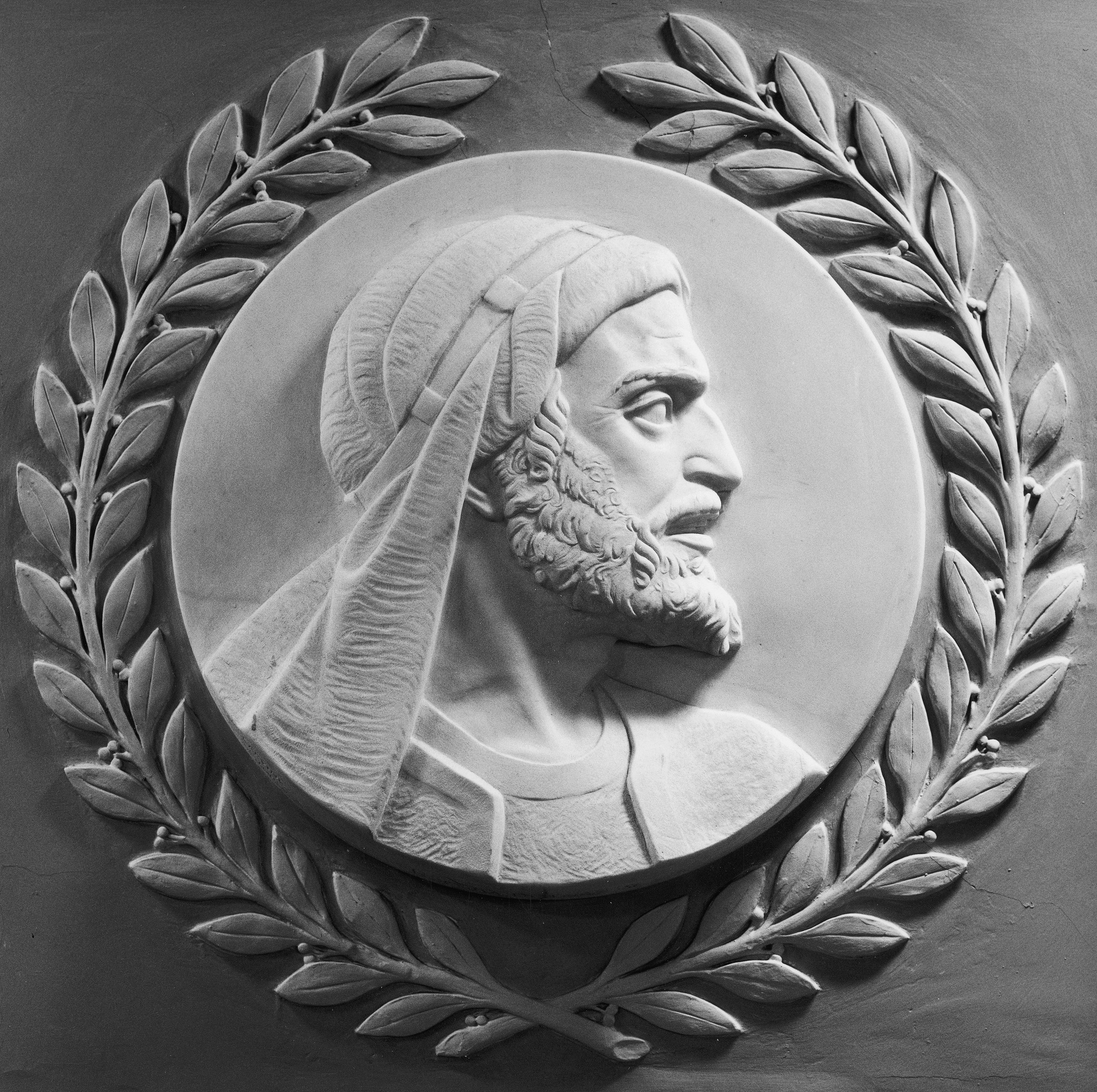
A bas relief of Maimonides in the United States House of Representatives

Around 1171, Maimonides was appointed the nagid of the Egyptian Jewish community. Shelomo Dov Goitein believes the leadership he displayed during the ransoming of the Crusader captives led to this appointment. He was replaced by Sar Shalom ben Moses in 1173. During Sar Shalom's controversial appointment, during which Sar Shalom was accused of tax farming, Maimonides excommunicated and fought with him for several years until Maimonides was appointed Nagid in 1195. Abraham bar Hillel wrote a scathing description of Sar Shalom in his Megillat Zutta while praising Maimonides as "the light of east and west and unique master and marvel of the generation."

=== Physician for the Ayyubid dynasty ===
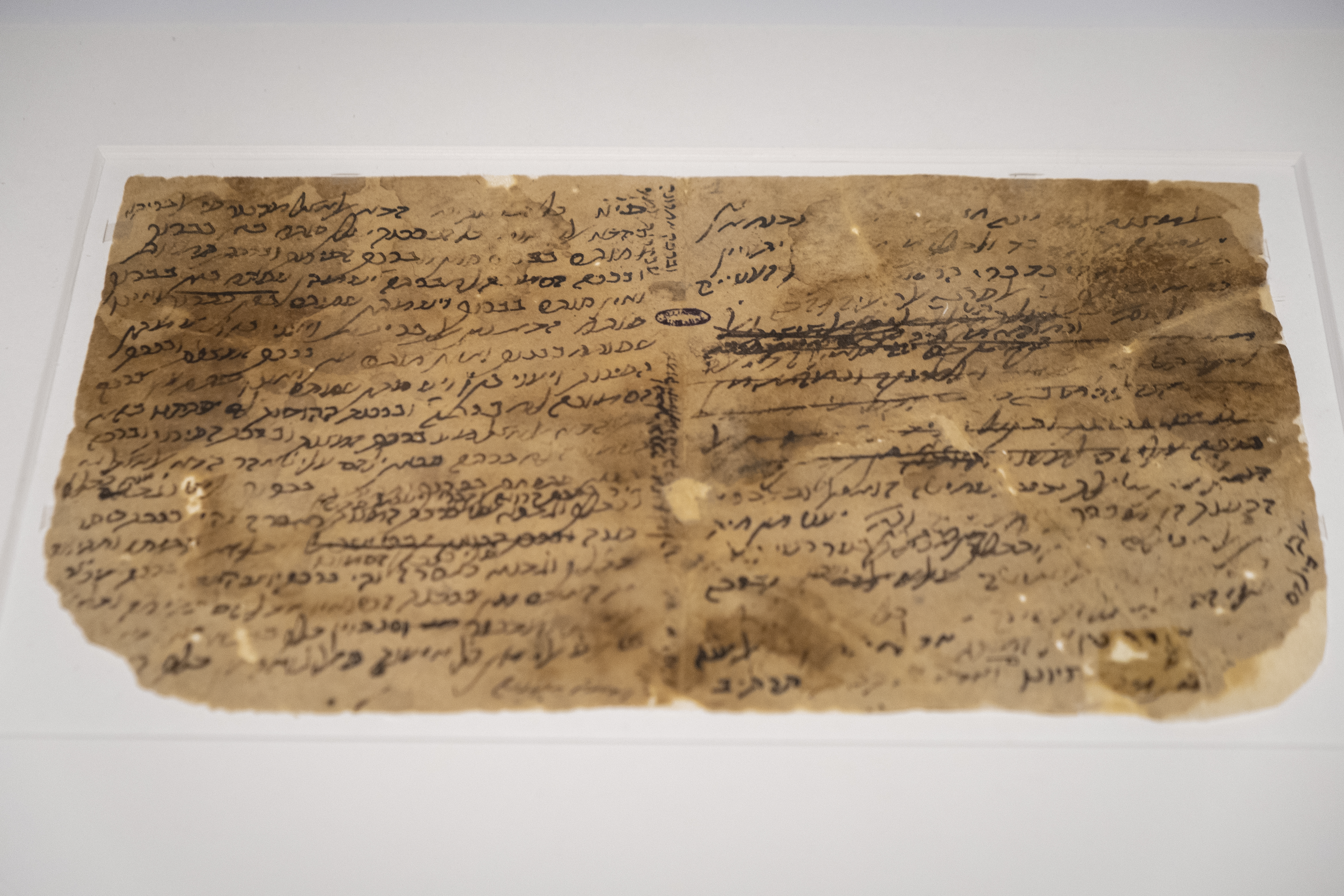
Commentary on the Mishneh Torah, Maimonides, 12th century. Institut du Monde Arabe, Paris

With the loss of the family funds tied up in David's business venture, Maimonides assumed the vocation of physician, for which he was to become famous. He had trained in medicine in both Spain and in Fez. Gaining widespread recognition, he was appointed court physician to Qadi al-Fadil, the chief secretary to Sultan Saladin, then to Saladin himself; after whose death he remained a physician to the Ayyubid dynasty.

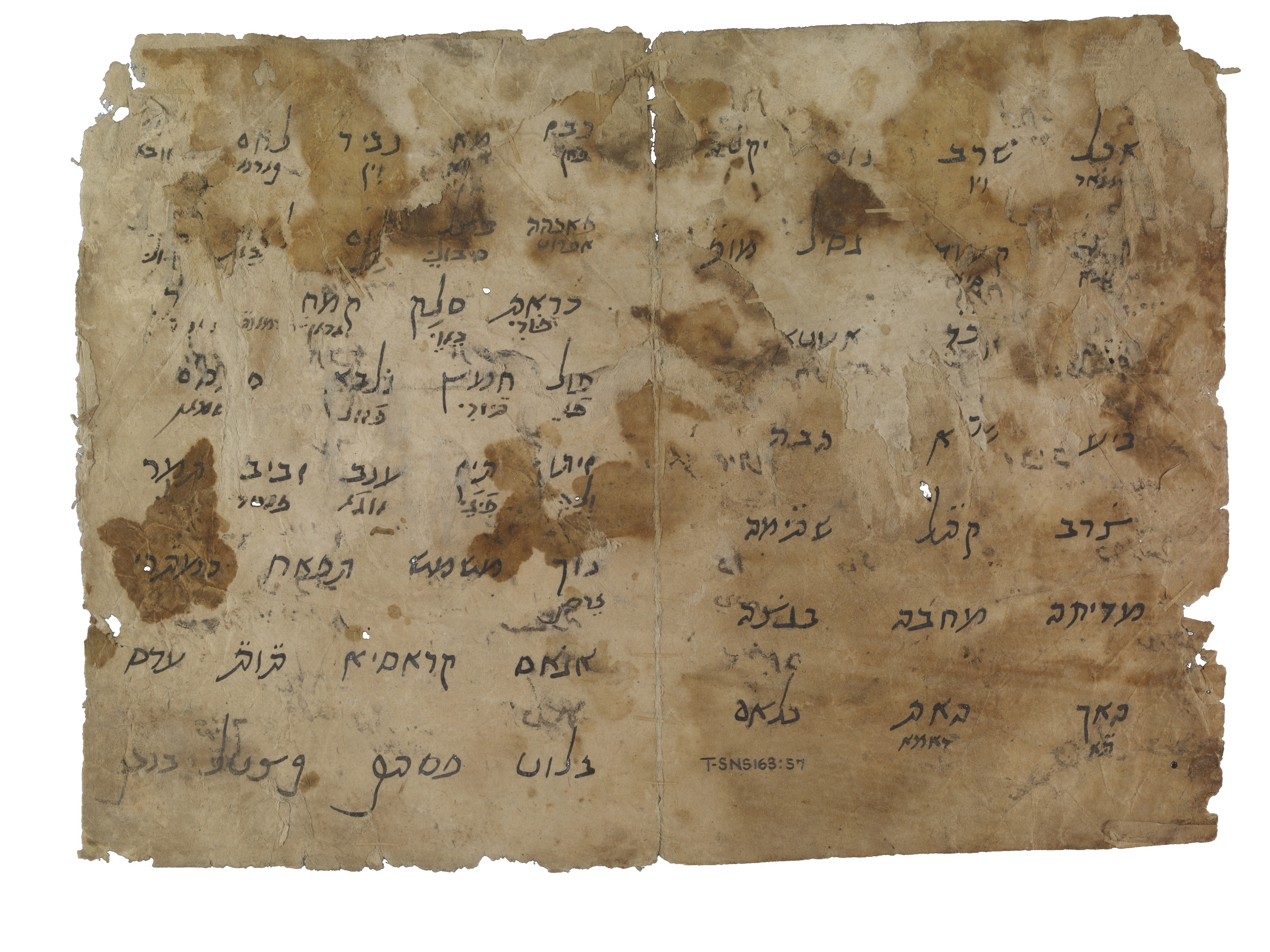
An autograph from the Cairo Geniza with words in Arabic and their Romance translations, both written in Hebrew script

In his medical writings, Maimonides described many conditions, including asthma, diabetes, hepatitis, and pneumonia, and he emphasized moderation and a healthy lifestyle. His treatises became influential for generations of physicians. He was knowledgeable about Greek and Arabic medicine, and followed the principles of humorism in the tradition of Galen. He did not blindly accept authority but used his own observation and experience. Julia Bess Frank indicates that Maimonides in his medical writings sought to interpret works of authorities so that they could become acceptable.

Maimonides displayed in his interactions with patients attributes that today would be called intercultural awareness and respect for the patient's autonomy. Although he frequently wrote of his longing for solitude in order to come closer to God and to extend his reflections—elements considered essential in his philosophy to the prophetic experience—he gave over most of his time to caring for others. In a famous letter, Maimonides describes his daily routine. After visiting the Sultan's palace, he would arrive home exhausted and hungry, where "I would find the antechambers filled with gentiles and Jews [...] I would go to heal them, and write prescriptions for their illnesses [...] until the evening [...] and I would be extremely weak."

As he goes on to say in this letter, even on Shabbat he would receive members of the community. Still, he managed to write extended treatises, including not only medical and other scientific studies but some of the most systematically thought-through and influential treatises on halakha (rabbinic law) and Jewish philosophy of the Middle Ages. (Note: Such views of his works are found in almost all scholarly studies of the man and his significance. See, for example, the "Introduction" sub-chapter by Howard Kreisel to his overview article "Moses Maimonides", in History of Jewish Philosophy, edited by Daniel H. Frank and Oliver Leaman, Second Edition (New York and London: Routledge, 2003), pp. 245–246.)

In 1172–74, Maimonides wrote his famous Epistle to Yemen. It has been suggested that his "incessant travail" undermined his own health and brought about his death at 69 (although this is a normal lifespan).

=== Death and burial place ===
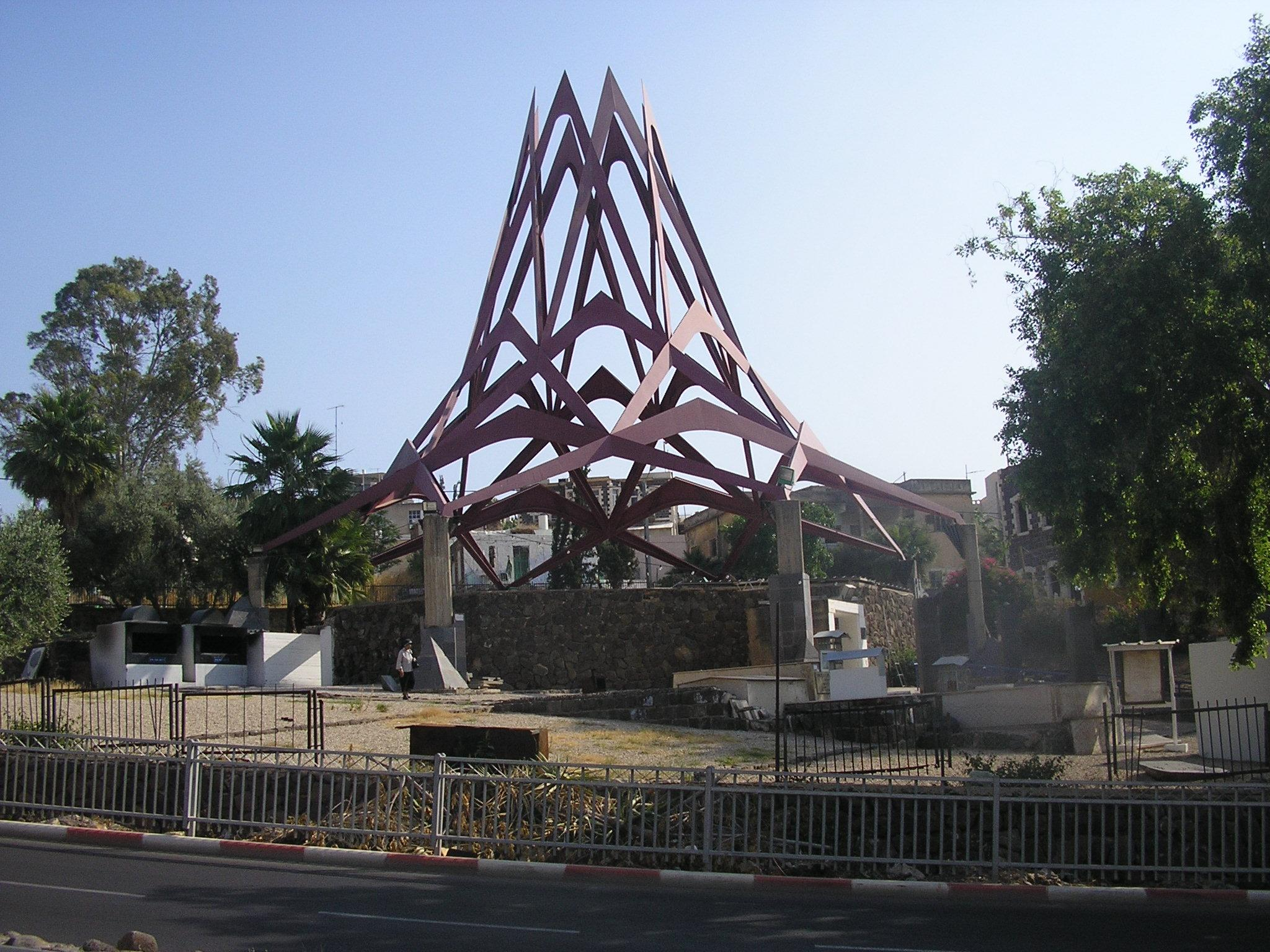
The Tomb of Maimonides in Tiberias

Maimonides died on 12 December 1204 (20th of Tevet 4965) in Fustat. A variety of medieval sources beginning with al-Qifti maintain that his body was interred near the Sea of Galilee, though there is no contemporary evidence for his removal from Egypt. Gedaliah ibn Yahya ben Joseph records that "He was buried in the Upper Galilee with elegies upon his gravestone. In the time of Kimhi, when the sons of Belial rose up to besmirch [Maimonides] . . . they did evil. They altered his gravestone, which previously had been inscribed 'choicest of the human race (מבחר המין האנושי)', so that instead it read 'the excommunicated heretic (מוחרם ומין)'. But later, after the provocateurs had repented of their act, and praised this great man, a student repaired the gravestone to read 'choicest of the Israelites (מבחר המין הישראלי)'". Today, Tiberias hosts the Tomb of Maimonides, on which is inscribed "From Moses to Moses arose none like Moses."

He is buried in Tomb of Maimonides in Tiberias. Other notable rabbis also buried in this complex are Isaiah Horowitz, Eliezer ben Hurcanus, Yohanan ben Zakkai, and Joshua ben Hananiah.

==== Ancestry and descendants ====
Maimonides is sometimes said to be a descendant of David, although he never made such a claim.

Aaron ben Jacob ha-Kohen later wrote that he had traced Maimonides' descent back to Simeon ben Judah ha-Nasi from the Davidic line. His ancestry, going back four generations, is given in his Epistle to Yemen as Moses ben Maimon ben Joseph ben Isaac ben Obadiah. At the end of his commentary on the Mishnah, however, a longer, slightly different genealogy is given: Moses ben Maimon ben Joseph ben Isaac ben Joseph ben Obadiah ben Solomon ben Obadiah.

Maimonides and his wife, the daughter of Mishael ben Yeshayahu Halevi, had one child who survived into adulthood, Abraham Maimonides, who became recognized as a great scholar, but his scholarship and career was overshadowed by his father's importance. He succeeded Maimonides as Nagid and as court physician at the age of eighteen. Throughout his career, he defended his father's writings against all critics. The office of Nagid was held by the Maimonides family for four successive generations, until the end of the 14th century.

== Philosophical and theological commentary ==
Through The Guide for the Perplexed, Mishneh Torah, and the philosophical introductions to sections of his commentaries on the Mishnah, Maimonides exerted an important influence on the Scholastic philosophers, especially on Albertus Magnus, Thomas Aquinas and Duns Scotus. He was a Jewish Scholastic. Educated more by reading the works of Arab Muslim philosophers than by personal contact with Arabian teachers, he acquired an intimate acquaintance not only with Arab Muslim philosophy, but with the doctrines of Aristotle. Maimonides strove to reconcile Aristotelianism and science with the teachings of the Torah.

In his Guide for the Perplexed, he often explains the function and purpose of the statutory provisions contained in the Torah against the backdrop of the historical conditions. The book was highly controversial in its day, and was banned by French rabbis, who burnt copies of the work in Montpellier.

=== Thirteen principles of faith in Judaism ===
In his commentary on the Mishnah (Tractate Sanhedrin, chapter 10), Maimonides formulates his "13 principles of faith"; and that these principles summarized what he viewed as the required beliefs of Judaism:

1. The existence of God.
2. God's unity and indivisibility into elements.
3. God's spirituality and incorporeality.
4. God's eternity.
5. God alone should be the object of worship.
6. Revelation through God's prophets.
7. The preeminence of Moses among the prophets.
8. That the entire Torah (both the Written and Oral law) are of Divine origin and were dictated to Moses by God on Mt. Sinai.
9. The Torah given by Moses is permanent and will not be replaced or changed.
10. God's awareness of all human actions and thoughts.
11. Reward of righteousness and punishment of evil.
12. The coming of the Messiah.
13. The resurrection of the dead.

Maimonides is said to have compiled the principles from various Talmudic sources. These principles were controversial when first proposed, evoking criticism by Rabbis Hasdai Crescas and Joseph Albo, and were effectively ignored by much of the Jewish community for the next few centuries. However, these principles have become widely held and are considered to be the cardinal principles of faith for Orthodox Jews. Two poetic restatements of these principles (Ani Ma'amin and Yigdal) eventually became canonized in many editions of the Siddur (Jewish prayer book).

The omission of a list of these principles as such within his later works, the Mishneh Torah and The Guide for the Perplexed, has led some to suggest that either he retracted his earlier position, or that these principles are descriptive rather than prescriptive.

=== Nature of the God of Abraham ===
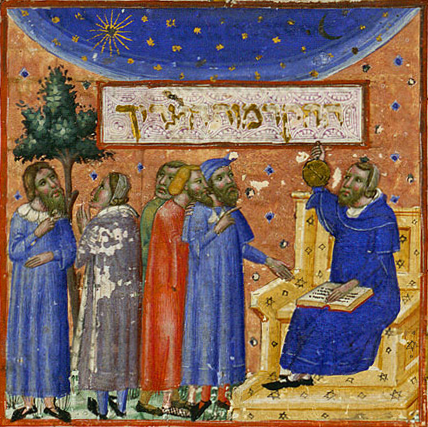
A depiction of Maimonides teaching students about the 'measure of man' in an illuminated manuscript

Maimonides equated the God of Abraham to what philosophers refer to as the Necessary Being. God is unique in the universe, and the Torah commands that one love and fear God (Deut 10:12) on account of that uniqueness. To Maimonides, this meant that one ought to contemplate God's works and to marvel at the order and wisdom that went into their creation. When one does this, one inevitably comes to love God and to sense how insignificant one is in comparison to God. This is the basis of the Torah.

The principle that inspired his philosophical activity was identical to a fundamental tenet of scholasticism: there can be no contradiction between the truths which God has revealed and the findings of the human mind in science and philosophy. Maimonides primarily relied upon the science of Aristotle and the teachings of the Talmud, commonly claiming to find a basis for the latter in the former.

Maimonides' admiration for the Neoplatonic commentators led him to doctrines which the later Scholastics did not accept. For instance, Maimonides was an adherent of apophatic theology. In this theology, one attempts to describe God through negative attributes. For example, one should not say that God exists in the usual sense of the term; it can be said that God is not non-existent. One should not say that "God is wise"; but it can be said that "God is not ignorant," i.e., in some way, God has some properties of knowledge. One should not say that "God is One," but it can be stated that "there is no multiplicity in God's being." In brief, the attempt is to gain and express knowledge of God by describing what God is not, rather than by describing what God "is."

Maimonides argued adamantly that God is not corporeal. This was central to his thinking about the sin of idolatry. Maimonides insisted that all of the anthropomorphic phrases pertaining to God in sacred texts are to be interpreted metaphorically. A related tenet of Maimonidean theology is the notion that the commandments, especially those pertaining to sacrifices, are intended to help wean the Israelites away from idolatry.

Maimonides also argued that God embodied reason, intellect, science, and nature, and was omnipotent and indescribable. He said that science, the growth of scientific fields, and discovery of the unknown by comprehension of nature was a way to appreciate God.

=== Morality in character development ===
Maimonides taught about the developing of one's moral character. Although his life predated the modern concept of a personality, Maimonides believed that each person has an innate disposition along an ethical and emotional spectrum. Although one's disposition is often determined by factors outside of one's control, human beings have free will to choose to behave in ways that build character.

He wrote, "One is obligated to conduct his affairs with others in a gentle and pleasing manner." Maimonides advised that those with antisocial character traits should identify those traits and then make a conscious effort to behave in the opposite way. For example, an arrogant person should practice humility. If the circumstances of one's environment are such that it is impossible to behave ethically, one must move to a new location.

==== The "prophetic" state ====
Maimonides agreed with "the Philosopher" (Aristotle) that the use of logic is the "right" way of thinking. He claimed that in order to understand how to know God, every human being must, by study, and meditation attain the degree of perfection required to reach the prophetic state. Despite his rationalistic approach, he does not explicitly reject the previous ideas (as portrayed, for example, by Yehuda Halevi in his Kuzari) that in order to become a prophet, God must intervene. Maimonides teaches that prophecy is the highest purpose of the most learned and refined individuals.

=== Problem of evil in spite of God's presence ===
Maimonides wrote on theodicy (the philosophical attempt to reconcile the existence of a God with the existence of evil). He took the premise that an omnipotent and good God exists. In The Guide for the Perplexed, Maimonides writes that all the evil that exists within human beings stems from their individual attributes, while all good comes from a universally shared humanity (Guide 3:8). He says that there are people who are guided by higher purpose, and there are those who are guided by physicality and must strive to find the higher purpose with which to guide their actions.

To justify the existence of evil, assuming God is both omnipotent and omnibenevolent, Maimonides postulates that one who created something by causing its opposite not to exist is not the same as creating something that exists; so evil is merely the absence of good. God did not create evil, rather God created good, and evil exists where good is absent (Guide 3:10). Therefore, all good is divine invention, and evil both is not and comes secondarily.

Maimonides contests the common view that evil outweighs good in the world. He says that if one were to examine existence only in terms of humanity, then that person may observe evil to dominate good, but if one looks at the whole of the universe, then he sees good is significantly more common than evil (Guide 3:12). Man, he reasons, is too insignificant a figure in God's myriad works to be their primary characterizing force, and so when people see mostly evil in their lives, they are not taking into account the extent of positive Creation outside of themselves.

Maimonides believes that there are three types of evil in the world: evil caused by nature, evil that people bring upon others, and evil man brings upon himself (Guide 3:12). The first type of evil Maimonides states is the rarest form, but arguably of the most necessary—the balance of life and death in both the human and animal worlds itself, he recognizes, is essential to God's plan. Maimonides writes that the second type of evil is relatively rare, and that humanity brings it upon itself.

The third type of evil humans bring upon themselves and is the source of most of the ills of the world. These are the result of people's falling victim to their physical desires. To prevent the majority of evil which stems from harm one does to oneself, one must learn how to respond to one's bodily urges.

=== Skepticism of astrology ===
Maimonides answered an inquiry concerning astrology, addressed to him from Marseille. He responded that man should believe only what can be supported either by rational proof, by the evidence of the senses, or by trustworthy authority. He affirms that he had studied astrology, and that it does not deserve to be described as a science. He ridicules the concept that the fate of a man could be dependent upon the constellations; he argues that such a theory would rob life of purpose, and would make man a slave of destiny.

Unlike some of his contemporaries, Maimonides did not believe that Greek knowledge had originated with the Jews originally, but he does believe that the sages and Solomon knew science and philosophy, however he does not believe those books have survived down to his time. He notes that rabbinical knowledge of mathematics was imperfect because it was learned from contemporary men of science, and not divinely inspired prophecy.

=== True beliefs versus necessary beliefs ===
In The Guide for the Perplexed Book III, Chapter 28, Maimonides draws a distinction between "true beliefs," which were beliefs about God that produced intellectual perfection, and "necessary beliefs," which were conducive to improving social order. Maimonides places anthropomorphic personification statements about God in the latter class. He uses as an example the notion that God becomes "angry" with people who do wrong. In the view of Maimonides (taken from Avicenna), God does not become angry with people, as God has no human passions; but it is important for them to believe God does, so that they desist from doing wrong.

=== Hierarchy of righteousness (tzedakah) ===
Maimonides conceived of an eight-level hierarchy of tzedakah, where the highest form is to give a gift, loan, or partnership that will result in the recipient becoming self-sufficient instead of living upon others. In his view, the lowest form of tzedakah is to give begrudgingly. The eight levels are:

1. Giving begrudgingly
2. Giving less than you should, but giving it cheerfully
3. Giving as much as you should after being asked
4. Giving the correct amount before being asked
5. Giving when you do not know the recipient's identity, but the recipient knows your identity
6. Giving when you know the recipient's identity, but the recipient doesn't know your identity
7. Giving when neither party knows the other's identity
8. Enabling the recipient to become self-reliant

=== Biblical eschatology and events ===
==== The Messianic era ====
Perhaps one of Maimonides' most highly acclaimed and renowned writings is his treatise on the Messianic era, written originally in Judeo-Arabic and which he elaborates on in great detail in his Commentary on the Mishnah (Introduction to the 10th chapter of tractate Sanhedrin, also known as Pereḳ Ḥeleḳ).

===== Resurrection of the Dead =====
Religious Jews believed in immortality in a spiritual sense, and most believed that the future would include a messianic era and a resurrection of the dead. This is the subject of Jewish eschatology. Maimonides wrote much on this topic, but in most cases he wrote about the immortality of the soul for people of perfected intellect; his writings were usually not about the resurrection of dead bodies. Rabbis of his day were critical of this aspect of this thought, and there was controversy over his true views. (Note: According to Maimonides, certain Jews in Yemen had sent to him a letter in the year 1189, evidently irritated as to why he had not mentioned the physical resurrection of the dead in his Hil. Teshuvah, chapter 8, and how some persons in Yemen had begun to instruct, based on Maimonides' teaching, that when the body dies, it will disintegrate and the soul will never return to such bodies after death. Maimonides denied that he ever insinuated such things, and reiterated that the body would indeed resurrect, but that the "world to come" was something different in nature. See: Maimonides' Ma'amar Teḥayyath Hamethim (Treatise on the Resurrection of the Dead), published in Book of Letters and Responsa (ספר אגרות ותשובות), Jerusalem 1978, p. 9 (Hebrew).)

Eventually, Maimonides felt pressured to write a treatise on the subject, known as "The Treatise on Resurrection." In it, he wrote that those who claimed that he believed the verses of the Hebrew Bible referring to the resurrection were only allegorical were spreading falsehoods. Maimonides asserts that belief in resurrection is a fundamental truth of Judaism about which there is no disagreement.

While his position on the World to Come (non-corporeal eternal life as described above) may be seen as being in contradiction with his position on bodily resurrection, Maimonides resolved them with a then unique solution: Maimonides believed that the resurrection was not permanent or general. In his view, God never violates the laws of nature. Rather, divine interaction is by way of angels, whom Maimonides often regards to be metaphors for the laws of nature, the principles by which the physical universe operates, or Platonic eternal forms. (Note: This view is not always consistent throughout Maimonides' work; in Hilchot Yesodei HaTorah, chapters 2–4, Maimonides describes angels that are actually created beings.) Thus, if a unique event actually occurs, even if it is perceived as a miracle, it is not a violation of the world's order.

In this view, any dead who are resurrected must eventually die again. In his discussion of the 13 principles of faith, the first five deal with knowledge of God, the next four deal with prophecy and the Torah, while the last four deal with reward, punishment and the ultimate redemption. In this discussion Maimonides says nothing of a universal resurrection. All he says it is that whatever resurrection does take place, it will occur at an indeterminate time before the world to come, which he repeatedly states will be purely spiritual.

===== The World to Come =====
Maimonides distinguishes two kinds of intelligence in man, the one material in the sense of being dependent on, and influenced by, the body, and the other immaterial, that is, independent of the bodily organism. The latter is a direct emanation from the universal active intellect; this is his interpretation of the noûs poietikós of Aristotelian philosophy. It is acquired as the result of the efforts of the soul to attain a correct knowledge of the absolute, pure intelligence of God.

The knowledge of God is a form of knowledge which develops in us the immaterial intelligence, and thus confers on man an immaterial, spiritual nature. This confers on the soul that perfection in which human happiness consists, and endows the soul with immortality. One who has attained a correct knowledge of God has reached a condition of existence, which renders him immune from all the accidents of fortune, from all the allurements of sin, and from death itself. Man is in a position to work out his own salvation and his immortality.

Baruch Spinoza's doctrine of immortality was strikingly similar. However, Spinoza teaches that the way to attain the knowledge which confers immortality is the progress from sense-knowledge through scientific knowledge to philosophical intuition of all things sub specie æternitatis, while Maimonides holds that the road to perfection and immortality is the path of duty as described in the Torah and the rabbinic understanding of the oral law.

Maimonides describes the world to come as the stage after a person lives their life in this world as well as the final state of existence after the Messianic Era. Some time after the resurrection of the dead, souls will live forever without bodies. They will enjoy the radiance of the Divine Presence without the need for food, drink or sexual pleasures.

=== Views on contemporary Kabbalah ===
Maimonides was not known as a supporter of Kabbalah, although a strong intellectual type of mysticism has been discerned in his philosophy. In The Guide for the Perplexed, Maimonides declares his intention to conceal from the average reader his explanations of Sod (Note: "Within [the Torah] there is also another part which is called 'hidden' (mutsnaʿ), and this [concerns] the secrets (sodot) which the human intellect cannot attain, like the meanings of the statutes (ḥukim) and other hidden secrets. They can neither be attained through the intellect nor through sheer volition, but they are revealed before Him who created [the Torah]". (Abraham ben Asher, The Or ha-Sekhel)) esoteric meanings of Torah. The nature of these "secrets" is debated. Religious Jewish rationalists, and the mainstream academic view, read Maimonides' Aristotelianism as a mutually-exclusive alternative metaphysics to Kabbalah. Some academics hold that Maimonides' project fought against the Proto-Kabbalah of his time.

Maimonides employed rationalism to defend Judaism rather than limit inquiry of Sod only to rationalism. His rationalism, if not taken as an opposition, (Note: Contemporary academic views in the study of Jewish mysticism, hold that 12–13th century Kabbalists wrote down and systemised their transmitted oral doctrines in oppositional response to Maimonidean rationalism. See e.g. Moshe Idel, Kabbalah: New Perspectives) also assisted the Kabbalists, purifying their transmitted teaching from mistaken corporeal interpretations that could have been made from Hekhalot literature, (Note: The first comprehensive systemiser of Kabbalah, Moses ben Jacob Cordovero, for example, was influenced by Maimonides. One example is his instruction to undercut any conception of a Kabbalistic idea after grasping it in the mind. One's intellect runs to God in learning the idea, then returns in qualified rejection of false spatial/temporal conceptions of the idea's truth, as the human mind can only think in material references. Cited in Louis Jacobs, The Jewish Religion: A Companion, Oxford University Press, 1995, entry on Cordovero.) though Kabbalists held that their theosophy alone allowed human access to Divine mysteries.

== Published works ==
Maimonides, who was revered for his personality as well as for his writings, led a busy life, and wrote many of his works while travelling or in temporary accommodation. Most of his work was originally compiled in Arabic, though he also wrote some of his religious tracts in Hebrew, with many of the earliest translations by other scholars existing primarily in Greek and Latin.

=== On Judaism ===
==== Mishneh Torah ====
With Mishneh Torah, Maimonides composed a comprehensive code of Jewish law. The work gathers all the binding laws from the Talmud, and incorporates the positions of the Geonim (post-Talmudic early medieval scholars, mainly from Mesopotamia). It is also known as Yad ha-Chazaka or simply Yad (יד) which has the numerical value 14, representing the 14 books of the work. The Mishneh Torah made following Jewish law easier for the Jews of his time, who were struggling to understand the complex nature of Jewish rules and regulations as they had adapted over the years.

Later codes of halakha such as the Arba'ah Turim of Jacob ben Asher and Shulchan Aruch of Joseph Karo draw heavily on Mishneh Torah; both often quote whole sections verbatim. It met initially with much opposition. There were two main reasons for this opposition. First, Maimonides had refrained from adding references to his work for the sake of brevity; second, in the introduction, he gave the impression of wanting to "cut out" study of the Talmud, to arrive at a conclusion in Jewish law, although Maimonides later wrote that this was not his intent.

His most forceful opponents were the rabbis of Provence (Southern France), and a running critique by Abraham ben David (Raavad III) is printed in virtually all editions of Mishneh Torah. Nevertheless, Mishneh Torah was recognized as a monumental contribution to the systemized writing of halakha. Throughout the centuries, it has been widely studied and its halakhic decisions have weighed heavily in later rulings.

In response to those who would attempt to force followers of Maimonides and his Mishneh Torah to abide by the rulings of his own Shulchan Aruch or other later works, Joseph Karo wrote: "Who would dare force communities who follow the Rambam to follow any other decisor [of Jewish law], early or late? [...] The Rambam is the greatest of the decisors, and all the communities of the Land of Israel and the Arabistan and the Maghreb practice according to his word, and accepted him as their rabbi."

An oft-cited legal maxim from his pen is: "It is better and more satisfactory to acquit a thousand guilty persons than to put a single innocent one to death." He argued that executing a defendant on anything less than absolute certainty would lead to a slippery slope of decreasing burdens of proof, until defendants would be convicted merely according to the judge's caprice.

==== Rabbinic law and theology ====
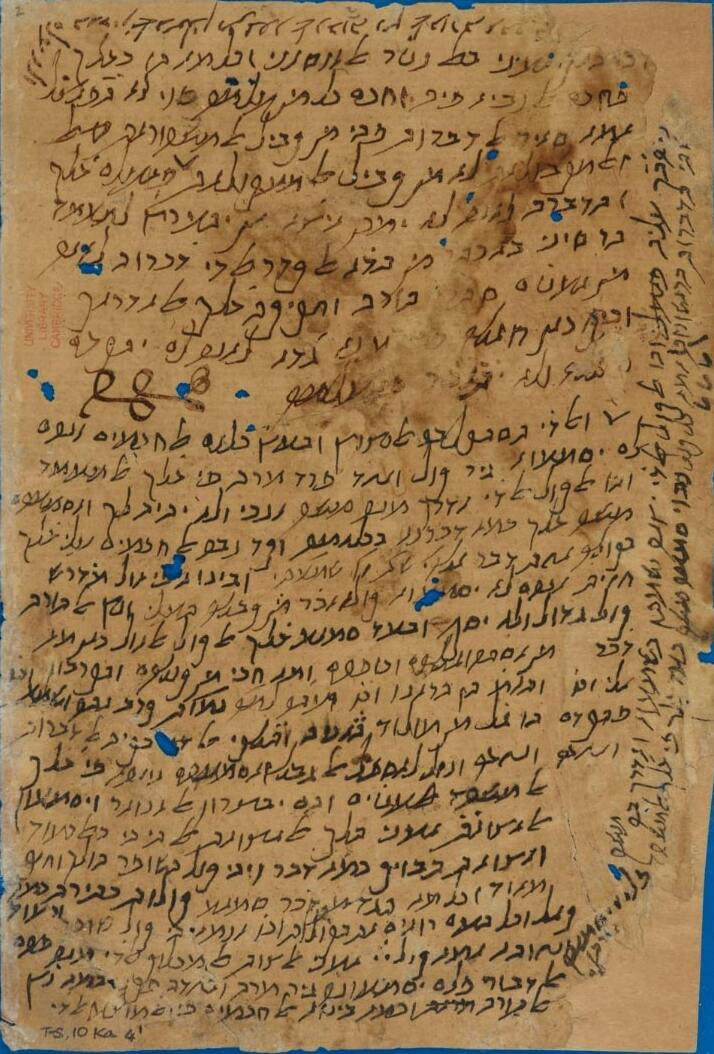
An autograph fragment of Maimonides' Guide for the Perplexed (Judeo-Arabic)

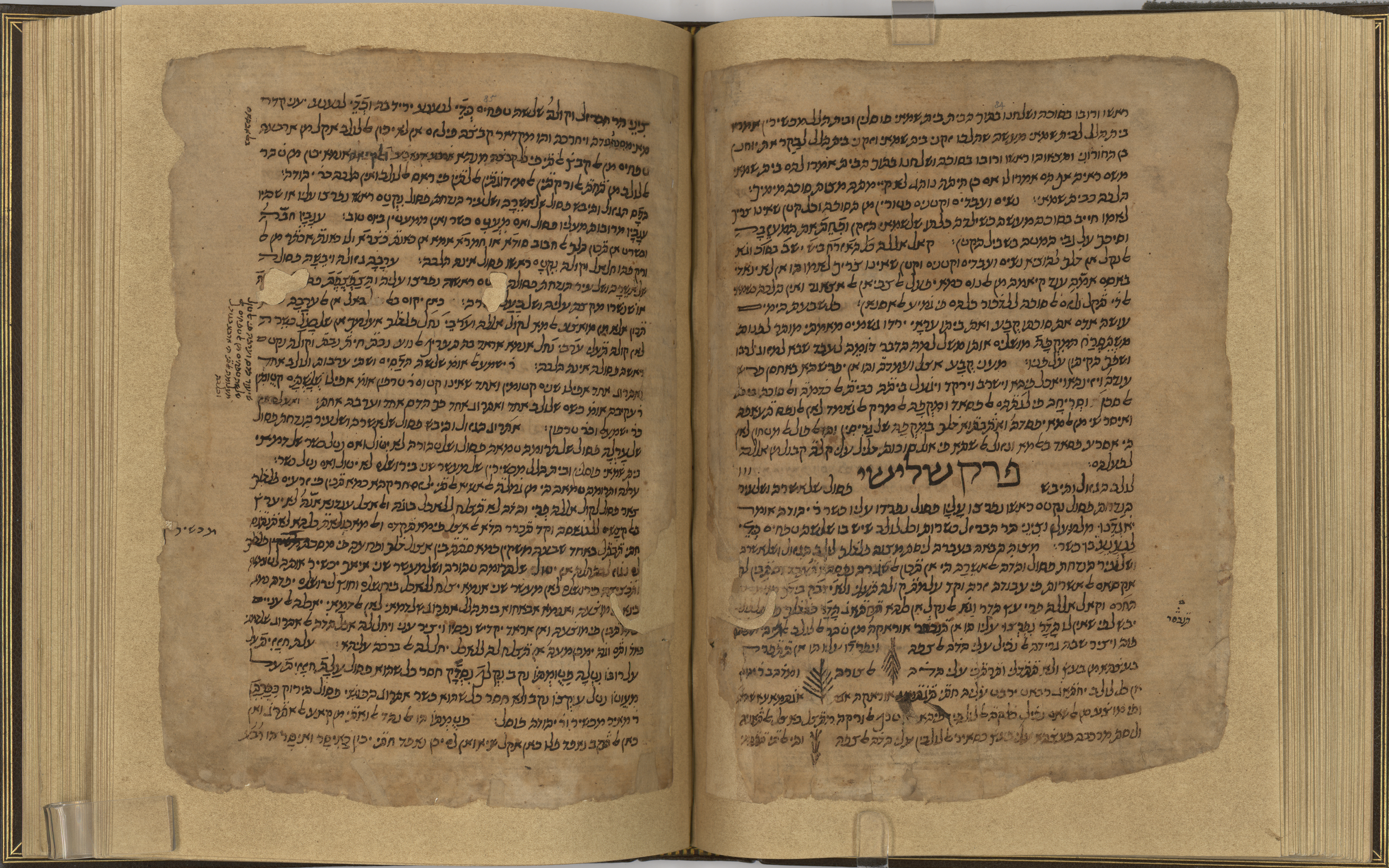
Autograph manuscript of Maimonides' Commentary to Tractate Sukkah, written in Judeo-Arabic solitreo

Maimonides composed works of Jewish scholarship, rabbinic law, philosophy, and medical texts. Most of Maimonides' works were written in Judeo-Arabic. However, the Mishneh Torah was written in Hebrew. In addition to Mishneh Torah, his Jewish texts were:

- Commentary on the Mishna (Arabic Kitab al-Siraj, translated into Hebrew as Pirush Hamishnayot), written in Classical Arabic using the Hebrew alphabet. This was the first full commentary ever written on the entire Mishnah, which took Maimonides seven years to complete. It is considered one of the most important Mishnah commentaries, having enjoyed great popularity both in its Arabic original and its medieval Hebrew translation. The commentary includes three philosophical introductions which were also highly influential:
  - The Introduction to the Mishnah deals with the nature of the oral law, the distinction between the prophet and the sage, and the organizational structure of the Mishnah.
  - The Introduction to Mishnah Sanhedrin, chapter ten (Pereḳ Ḥeleḳ), is an eschatological essay that concludes with Maimonides' famous creed ("the thirteen principles of faith").
  - The Introduction to Pirkei Avot, popularly called The Eight Chapters, is an ethical treatise.
- Sefer Hamitzvot (The Book of Commandments). In this work, Maimonides lists all the 613 mitzvot traditionally contained in the Torah (Pentateuch). He describes fourteen shorashim (roots or principles) to guide his selection.
- Sefer Ha'shamad (Letter of Martydom)
- The Guide for the Perplexed, a philosophical work harmonising and differentiating Aristotle's philosophy and Jewish theology. Written in Judeo-Arabic under the title Dalālat al-ḥāʾirīn, and completed between 1186 and 1190. It has been suggested that the title is derived from the Arabic phrase dalīl al-mutaḥayyirin (guide of the perplexed) a name for God in a work by al-Ghazālī, echoes of whose work can be found elsewhere in Maimonides. The first translation of this work into Hebrew was done by Samuel ibn Tibbon in 1204 just prior to Maimonides' death.
- Teshuvot, collected correspondence and responsa, including a number of public letters (on resurrection and the afterlife, on conversion to other faiths, and the Epistle to Yemen addressed to the oppressed Yemenite Jews).
- Hilkhot ha-Yerushalmi, a fragment of a commentary on the Jerusalem Talmud, identified and published by Saul Lieberman in 1947.
- Commentaries to the Babylonian Talmud, of which fragments survive.

=== On medicine ===
Maimonides' achievements in the medical field are well known, and are cited by many medieval authors. One of his more important medical works is his Guide to Good Health (Regimen Sanitatis), which he composed in Arabic for the Sultan al-Afdal, son of Saladin, who suffered from depression. The work was translated into Latin, and published in Florence in 1477, becoming the first medical book to appear in print there.

While his prescriptions may have become obsolete, "his ideas about preventive medicine, public hygiene, approach to the suffering patient, and the preservation of the health of the soul have not become obsolete." Maimonides wrote ten known medical works in Arabic that have been translated by the Jewish medical ethicist Fred Rosner into contemporary English. Lectures, conferences and research on Maimonides, even recently in the 21st century, have been done at medical universities in Morocco.

- Regimen Sanitatis, Suessmann Muntner (ed.), Mossad Harav Kook: Jerusalem 1963 (translated into Hebrew by Moshe Ibn Tibbon) (OCLC 729184001)
- The Art of Cure – Extracts from Galen (Barzel, 1992, Vol. 5) is essentially an extract of Galen's extensive writings.
- Commentary on the Aphorisms of Hippocrates (Rosner, 1987, Vol. 2; Hebrew: פירוש לפרקי אבוקראט) is interspersed with his own views.
- Medical Aphorisms of Moses (Rosner, 1989, Vol. 3) titled Fusul Musa in Arabic ("Chapters of Moses", Hebrew: פרקי משה) contains 1500 aphorisms and many medical conditions are described.
- Treatise on Hemorrhoids (in Rosner, 1984, Vol. 1; Hebrew: ברפואת הטחורים) discusses also digestion and food.
- Treatise on Cohabitation (in Rosner, 1984, Vol. 1) contains recipes as aphrodisiacs and anti-aphrodisiacs.
- Treatise on Asthma (Rosner, 1994, Vol. 6) discusses climates and diets and their effect on asthma and emphasizes the need for clean air.
- Treatise on Poisons and Their Antidotes (in Rosner, 1984, Vol. 1) is an early toxicology textbook that remained popular for centuries.
- Regimen of Health (in Rosner, 1990, Vol. 4; Hebrew: הנהגת הבריאות) is a discourse on healthy living and the mind-body connection.
- Discourse on the Explanation of Fits advocates healthy living and the avoidance of overabundance.
- Glossary of Drug Names (Rosner, 1992, Vol. 7) represents a pharmacopeia with 405 paragraphs with the names of drugs in Arabic, Greek, Syrian, Persian, Berber, and Spanish.

==== Oath of Maimonides ====
The Oath of Maimonides is a document about the medical calling and recited as a substitute for the Hippocratic Oath. It is not to be confused with a more lengthy Prayer of Maimonides. These documents may not have been written by Maimonides, but later. The Oath appeared first in print in 1793 and has been attributed to Markus Herz, a German physician, pupil of Immanuel Kant.

=== On philosophy ===
==== Treatise on Logic ====
The Treatise on Logic (Arabic: Maqala Fi-Sinat Al-Mantiq) has been printed 17 times, including editions in Latin (1527), German (1805, 1822, 1833, 1828), French (1936) by Moïse Ventura and in 1996 by Rémi Brague, and English (1938) by Israel Efros, and in an abridged Hebrew form. The work illustrates the essentials of Aristotelian logic to be found in the teachings of the great Islamic philosophers such as Avicenna and, above all, Al-Farabi, "the Second Master," the "First Master" being Aristotle.

In his work devoted to the Treatise, Rémi Brague stresses the fact that Al-Farabi is the only philosopher mentioned therein. This indicates a line of conduct for the reader, who must read the text keeping in mind Al-Farabi's works on logic. In the Hebrew versions, the Treatise is called The words of Logic which describes the bulk of the work. The author explains the technical meaning of the words used by logicians.

The Treatise inventories the terms used by the logician and indicates what they refer to. The work proceeds rationally through a lexicon of philosophical terms to a summary of higher philosophical topics, in 14 chapters corresponding to Maimonides' birthdate of 14 Nissan. The number 14 recurs in many of Maimonides' works. Each chapter offers a cluster of associated notions. The meaning of the words is explained and illustrated with examples. At the end of each chapter, the author carefully draws up the list of words studied.

Until very recently, it was accepted that Maimonides wrote the Treatise on Logic in his twenties or even in his teen years. Herbert Davidson has raised questions about Maimonides' authorship of this short work, and of other short works traditionally attributed to Maimonides. He maintains that Maimonides was not the author at all, based on a report of two Arabic-language manuscripts, unavailable to Western investigators in Asia Minor. Yosef Qafih maintained that it is by Maimonides and newly translated it to Hebrew (as Beiur M'lekhet HaHiggayon) from the Judeo-Arabic.

== Legacy ==
=== Influence on Jewish scholarship ===
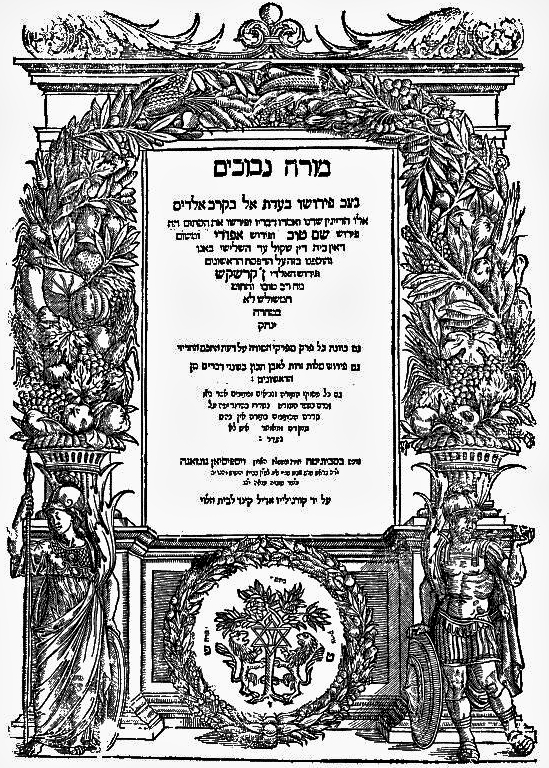
The title page of The Guide for the Perplexed

Maimonides' Mishneh Torah is considered by Jews even today as one of the chief authoritative codifications of Jewish law and ethics. It is exceptional for its logical construction, concise and clear expression and extraordinary learning, so that it became a standard against which other later codifications were often measured. It is still closely studied in rabbinic yeshivot (seminaries). The first to compile a comprehensive lexicon containing an alphabetically arranged list of difficult words found in Maimonides' Mishneh Torah was Tanḥum ha-Yerushalmi (1220–1291). A popular medieval saying that also served as his epitaph states, "From Mosheh [of the Torah] to Mosheh [Maimonides] there was none like Mosheh." It chiefly referred to his rabbinic writings.

However, Maimonides was also one of the most influential figures in medieval Jewish philosophy. His adaptation of Aristotelian thought to Biblical faith deeply impressed later Jewish thinkers, and had an unexpected immediate historical impact. Some more acculturated Jews in the century that followed his death, particularly in Spain, sought to apply Maimonides' Aristotelianism in ways that undercut traditionalist belief and observance, giving rise to an intellectual controversy in Spanish and southern French Jewish circles. The intensity of debate spurred Catholic Church interventions against "heresy" and a general confiscation of rabbinic texts.

In reaction, the more radical interpretations of Maimonides were defeated. At least amongst Ashkenazi Jews, there was a tendency to ignore his specifically philosophical writings and to stress instead the rabbinic and halakhic writings. These writings often included considerable philosophical chapters or discussions in support of halakhic observance; David Hartman observes that Maimonides clearly expressed "the traditional support for a philosophical understanding of God both in the Aggadah of Talmud and in the behavior of the hasid [the pious Jew]." Maimonidean thought continues to influence traditionally observant Jews.

The most rigorous medieval critique of Maimonides is Hasdai Crescas' Or Adonai. Crescas bucked the eclectic trend, by demolishing the certainty of the Aristotelian world-view, not only in religious matters but also in the most basic areas of medieval science (such as physics and geometry). Crescas' critique provoked a number of 15th-century scholars to write defenses of Maimonides.

Because of his path-finding synthesis of Aristotle and Biblical faith, Maimonides had an influence on Christian theologian Thomas Aquinas who refers to Maimonides in several of his works, including the Commentary on the Sentences.

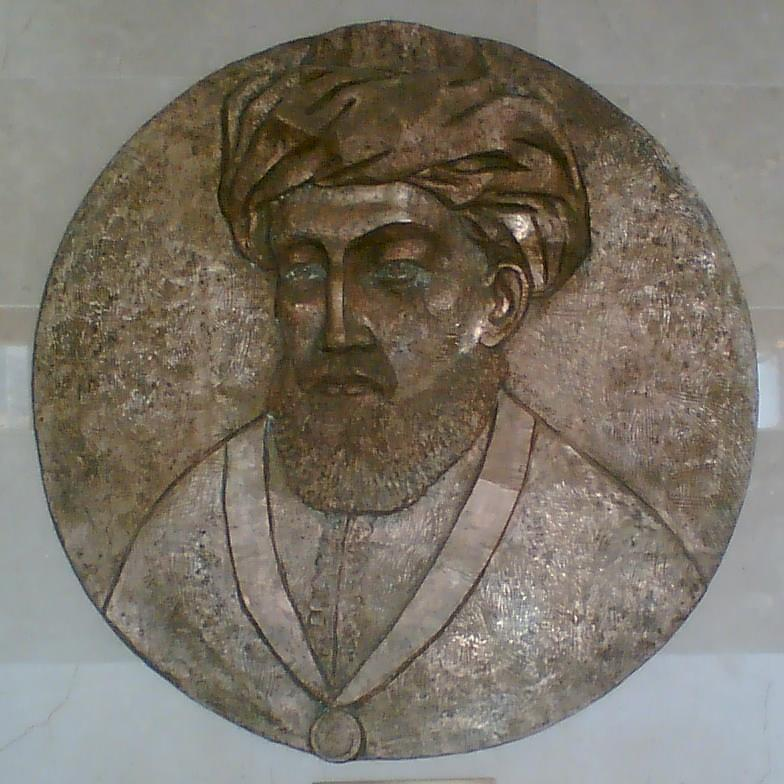
A plaque of Maimonides at Rambam Medical Center, Haifa

Maimonides' combined abilities in the fields of theology, philosophy and medicine make his work attractive today as a source during discussions of evolving norms in these fields, particularly medicine. An example is the modern citation of his method of determining death of the body in the controversy regarding declaration of death to permit organ donation for transplantation.

Maimonides remains one of the most widely debated Jewish thinkers among modern scholars. He has been adopted as a symbol and an intellectual hero by almost all major movements in modern Judaism, and has proven important to philosophers such as Leo Strauss; and his views on the importance of humility have been taken up by modern humanist philosophers. In academia, particularly within the area of Jewish Studies, the teaching of Maimonides has been dominated by traditional scholars, generally Orthodox, who place a very strong emphasis on Maimonides as a rationalist; one result is that certain sides of Maimonides' thought, including his opposition to anthropocentrism, have been obviated. There are movements in some postmodern circles to claim Maimonides for other purposes, as within the discourse of ecotheology. Maimonides' reconciliation of the philosophical and the traditional has given his legacy an extremely diverse and dynamic quality.

=== Tributes and memorials ===
A statue of Maimonides was erected near the Córdoba Synagogue.

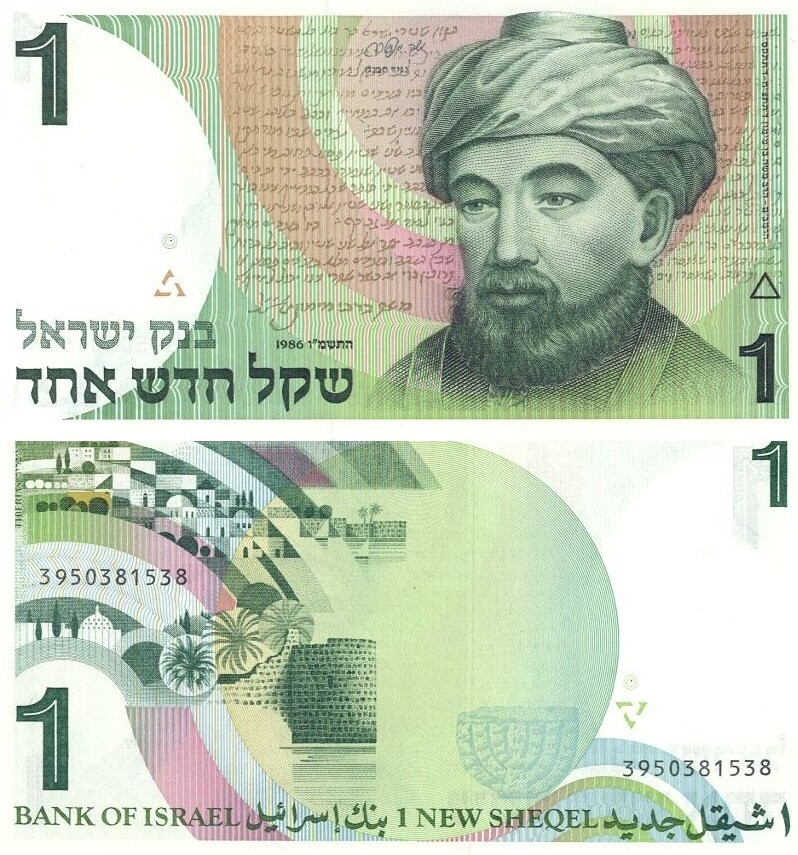
Maimonides used to be on the 1 ILS banknote.

Maimonides has been memorialized in numerous ways. For example, one of the Learning Communities at the Tufts University School of Medicine bears his name. There is also Maimonides School in Brookline, Massachusetts, Maimonides Academy School in Los Angeles, California, Lycée Maïmonide in Casablanca, the Brauser Maimonides Academy in Hollywood, Florida, and Maimonides Medical Center in Brooklyn, New York. Beit Harambam Congregation, a Sephardi synagogue in Philadelphia, Pennsylvania, is named after him.

Issued from 8 May 1986 to 1995, the Series A of the Israeli New Shekel featured an illustration of Maimonides on the obverse and the place of his burial in Tiberias on the reverse on its 1-shekel bill.

Maimonides is one of the heroes of the novel Century 21, Normal IL, Dalkey Archive Press, 1992 by Ewa Kuryluk.

In 2004, conferences were held at Yale University, Florida International University, Penn State, and Rambam Hospital in Haifa, Israel, which is named after him. To commemorate the 800th anniversary of his death, Harvard University issued a memorial volume. In 1953, the Israel Postal Authority issued a postage stamp of Maimonides, pictured.

In March 2008, during the Euromed Conference of Ministers of Tourism, The Tourism Ministries of Israel, Morocco and Spain agreed to work together on a joint project that will trace the footsteps of the Rambam and thus boost religious tourism in the cities of Córdoba, Fez and Tiberias.

Between December 2018 and January 2019 the Israel Museum held a special exhibit dedicated to the writings of Maimonides.

== See also ==
- Averroes
- Epistle to Yemen
- Maimonides Foundation
- Mimouna

== Bibliography ==
- This article incorporates text from a publication now in the public domain: Joseph Jacobs, Isaac Broydé (1901–1906). "Moses Ben Maimon". In Singer I, et al. (eds.). The Jewish Encyclopedia. The Executive Committee of the Editorial Board, and Jacob Zallel Lauterbach. New York: Funk & Wagnalls.
- Barzel U (1992). Maimonides' Medical Writings: The Art of Cure Extracts. Vol. 5. Galen: Maimonides Research Institute. Archived from the original on 17 June 2016.
- Bos G (2002). Maimonides. On Asthma (vol.1, vol.2). Provo, Utah: Brigham Young University Press.
- Bos G (2007). Maimonides. Medical Aphorisms Treatise 1–5 (6–9, 10–15, 16–21, 22–25). Provo, Utah: Brigham Young University Press.
- Davidson HA (2005). Moses Maimonides: The Man and his Works. Oxford University Press.
- Feldman Y (2008). Shemonah Perakim: The Eight Chapters of the Rambam. Targum Press.
- Fox M (1990). Interpreting Maimonides. Univ. of Chicago Press.
- Guttman J (1964). David Silverman (ed.). Philosophies of Judaism. Philadelphia: Jewish Publication Society of America.
- Halbertal M (2013). Maimonides: Life and Thought. Princeton University Press. ISBN 978-0-691-15851-8. Archived from the original on 5 September 2015.
- Hart Green K (2013). Leo Strauss on Maimonides: The Complete Writings. Chicago: University of Chicago Press.
- Hartman D (1976). Maimonides: Torah and Philosophic Quest. Philadelphia: Jewish Publication Society of America. ISBN 978-0-8276-0083-6.
- Heschel AJ (1982). Maimonides: The Life and Times of a Medieval Jewish Thinker. New York: Farrar Straus.
- Husik I (2002) [1941]. A History of Jewish Philosophy. Dover Publications, Inc. Originally published by the Jewish Publication of America, Philadelphia.
- Kaplan A (1994). "Maimonides Principles: The Fundamentals of Jewish Faith". The Aryeh Kaplan Anthology. I.
- Kellner M (1986). Dogma in Medieval Jewish Thought. London: Oxford University press. ISBN 978-0-19-710044-8.
- Kohler GY (2012). "Reading Maimonides' Philosophy in 19th Century Germany". Amsterdam Studies in Jewish Philosophy. 15.
- Kraemer JL (28 October 2008). Maimonides: The Life and World of One of Civilization's Greatest Minds. Random House Publishing Group. ISBN 978-0-385-52851-1.
- Leaman DH, Leaman F, Leaman O (2003). History of Jewish Philosophy (Second ed.). London and New York: Routledge. See especially chapters 10 through 15.
- Maimonides (1963). Suessmann Muntner (ed.). Moshe Ben Maimon (Maimonides) Medical Works (in Hebrew). Translated by Moshe Ibn Tibbon. Jerusalem: Mossad Harav Kook. OCLC 729184001.
- Maimonides (1967). Mishnah, with Maimonides' Commentary (in Hebrew). Vol. 3. Translated by Yosef Qafih. Jerusalem: Mossad Harav Kook. OCLC 741081810.
- Rosner F (1984–1994). Maimonides' Medical Writings. Vol. 7 Vols. Maimonides Research Institute. (Volume 5 translated by Uriel Barzel; foreword by Fred Rosner.)
- Seidenberg D (2005). "Maimonides – His Thought Related to Ecology". The Encyclopedia of Religion and Nature. Archived from the original on 8 December 2013.
- Shapiro MB (1993). "Maimonides Thirteen Principles: The Last Word in Jewish Theology?". The Torah U-Maddah Journal. 4.
- Shapiro MB (2008). Studies in Maimonides and His Interpreters. Scranton (PA): University of Scranton Press.
- Sirat C (1985). A History of Jewish Philosophy in the Middle Ages. Cambridge: Cambridge University Press. See chapters 5 through 8.
- Strauss L (1974). Shlomo Pines (ed.). How to Begin to Study the Guide: The Guide of the Perplexed – Maimonides (in Arabic). Vol. 1. University of Chicago Press.
- Strauss L (1988). Persecution and the Art of Writing. University of Chicago Press. ISBN 978-0-226-77711-5. reprint
- Stroumsa S (2009). Maimonides in His World: Portrait of a Mediterranean Thinker. Princeton University Press. ISBN 978-0-691-13763-6. Archived from the original on 3 June 2016.
- Telushkin J (2006). A Code of Jewish Ethics. Vol. 1 (You Shall Be Holy). New York: Bell Tower. OCLC 460444264.
- Twersky I (1972). I Twersky (ed.). A Maimonides Reader. New York: Behrman House.
- Twersky I (1980). "Introduction to the Code of Maimonides (Mishneh Torah)". Yale Judaica Series. XII. New Haven and London.
