= Paolo Cotta-Ramusino =

Italian physicist (born 1948)

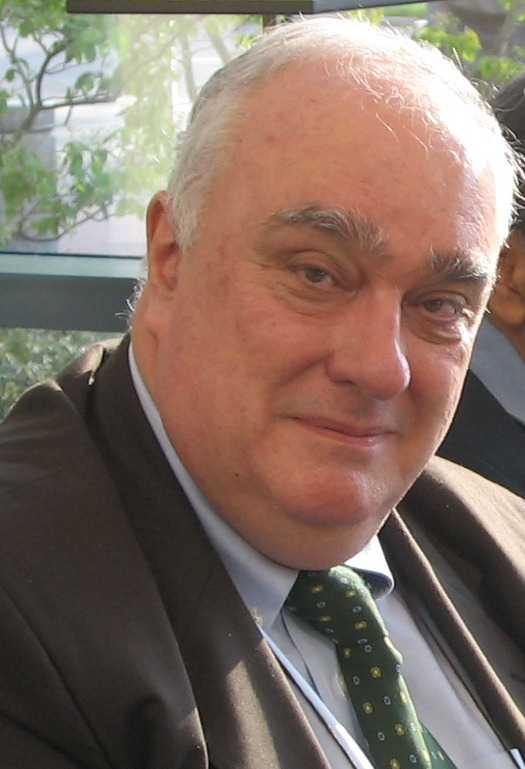
Cotta-Ramusino in 2009

Paolo Cotta-Ramusino (born 2 August 1948 in Cengio) is an Italian physicist who has been Secretary General of Pugwash Conferences on Science and World Affairs since August 2002. He is also Professor of Mathematical Physics at the University of Milan (Italy) and Senior Researcher at the Italian National Institute of Nuclear Physics. Cotta-Ramusino is an adjunct Professor, Centre of International Politics, Organization and Disarmament, School of International Studies, Jawaharlal Nehru University, New Delhi and an Associate with the Project on Managing the Atom, Belfer Center for Science and International Affairs, John F. Kennedy School of Government, Harvard University. He is a member of the International Institute for Strategic Studies, and the World Academy of Art and Sciences.

== Scientific career ==
Cotta-Ramusino received his doctorate (laurea) in physics in 1971 from the University of Milan. A mathematical physicist, Cotta-Ramusino researches mathematical aspects of quantum field and string theories. He is Full Professor in Mathematical Physics (Mathematical Methods of Physics), Department of Physics, University of Milan, and Senior Researcher at the Italian National Institute of Nuclear Physics. Previously he was Associate Professor in Mathematical Physics at University of Milan (1993–2000); Associate Professor in Theoretical Physics at the University of Trento (1988–1993); Visiting Professor in Mathematics at University of North Carolina, Chapel Hill NC (1990–1991); Research Associate at CERN, Geneva (1988); and Researcher in Theoretical Physics at the University of Milan (1981–1987). He has held postdoctoral positions and fellowships: at Harvard University, Cambridge MA, 1980 and 1981; Freie Universität Berlin, 1979; University of Milan, 1971–1978.

His past research activities have explored: topological Quantum Field Theories in any dimension, BF theories, Cohomology of imbedded loops, Higher dimensional knots; Links, knots and quantum groups; Differential geometrical aspects of string and field theories, Virasoro and Krichever-Novikov algebras; Anomalies in Quantum field theory and their differential geometrical interpretation; and Foundational aspects of Quantum Mechanics. His past and present teaching activities include: Mathematical Methods of Physics: complex analysis and functional analysis; Differential Geometry in Mathematical Physics: differentiable manifolds, Lie groups, principal bundles and their connections, Dirac operators; and Calculus.

== Scientists and World Affairs ==
Throughout the Cold War, Cotta-Ramusino has been a leading force in promoting the involvement of scientists in arms control and disarmament. In 1983, he co-founded the Italian Union of Scientists for Disarmament (USPID, and served on the USPID Scientific Council. He was formerly Director of the Program on Science, Technology and International Security at the Landau Network Centro Volta (Como) where he conducted research on the conversion of Russian Nuclear Cities and the development of programs for cooperation on energy-related issues in the Korean peninsula. Cotta-Ramusino has carried out research on tactical nuclear weapons, ballistic missile defense, and other issues related to European nuclear disarmament.

Cotta-Ramusino first participated in the Pugwash Conferences on Science and World Affairs at a meeting in Venice in 1983. He then took part in 36 more meetings before becoming Secretary General in 2002. Pugwash has been a groundbreaking force in creating international networks that address and alleviate the root problems of arms control and disarmament. Its focus on private meetings that address the interrelated issues of nuclear disarmament, non-military resolution of conflict, and the social responsibility of scientists derives from the famous Russell-Einstein Manifesto of 1955—the last public statement from Albert Einstein. The organization’s name comes from Pugwash, Nova Scotia, where the landmark meeting of scientists from East and West took place in 1957 during some of the darkest days of the Cold War. Throughout its history, Pugwash has won private and public acclaim from world leaders such as Mikhail Gorbachev and Kofi Annan. The success of its approach was reinforced by the awarding of the 1995 Nobel Peace Prize jointly to Pugwash and one of its leading spirits, the late Joseph Rotblat.

As Secretary General, Cotta-Ramusino has continued Pugwash’s tradition of addressing the need of eliminating nuclear weapons and other weapons of mass destruction. The organization, which involves both scientists and non-scientists, prioritizes preservation of the basic principles of the NPT (disarmament, non-proliferation and access to nuclear energy for all the Member States). Cotta-Ramusino has directed Pugwash to promote several track II initiatives and meetings mixing experts with officials in critical regions where either nuclear weapons exist or a concern about nuclear proliferation has been developed in an effort to promote in whatever ways possible, conflict resolution in those critical regions.

== Pugwash activities developed during Cotta-Ramusino’s tenure ==
- Nuclear stability, nuclear disarmament and non-proliferation: 1. Traditional Nuclear Disarmament, US-Russia nuclear disarmament, nuclear weapons in Europe; 2. Nuclear weapons and nuclear proliferation in the Middle East, Israeli nuclear weapons, Iranian nuclear program, proposal for a Middle Eastern zone free of weapons of mass destruction, Arab attitudes towards nuclear weapons and nuclear proliferation; 3. India and Pakistan nuclear relations, the effects of US India nuclear deal; 4. North Korea.
- Regional security in regions where nuclear weapons exist or risks of nuclear proliferation are significant: 1. Middle East—general issues, the impact of the Palestinian problem and its relevance in the Arab world, the consequences of the so-called Arab spring and the growth of the Islamic movements and parties, Arab-Iranian, Arab-Israeli and Iran-Israeli relations; 2. South-Central Asia—traditional antagonism between India and Pakistan, the role of terrorist attacks in the worsening of such antagonism, US-Pakistani relations in general. The role of radical movements in Pakistan, reconciliation and peace in Afghanistan, talking to the Taliban (is it possible and how should be done?), Pakistani-Afghani relations.

Paolo Cotta-Ramusino is an internationally recognized expert on these issues, and regularly writes and gives presentations on current topics in arms control, disarmament and conflict resolution at leading academic, research and governmental institutions, including recent talks, for example, at The World Summit of Nobel Peace Laureates, The International Institute of Strategic Studies, The Italian Parliament, Rome, The Royal Society, London, Council on Foreign Relations, Washington, DC, UK parliament, among others. He has been published in Le Monde, The Guardian, and other leading journals.

== Family ==
Cotta-Ramusino married in 1971, and has two daughters and two grandsons.
