= Pugwash River =

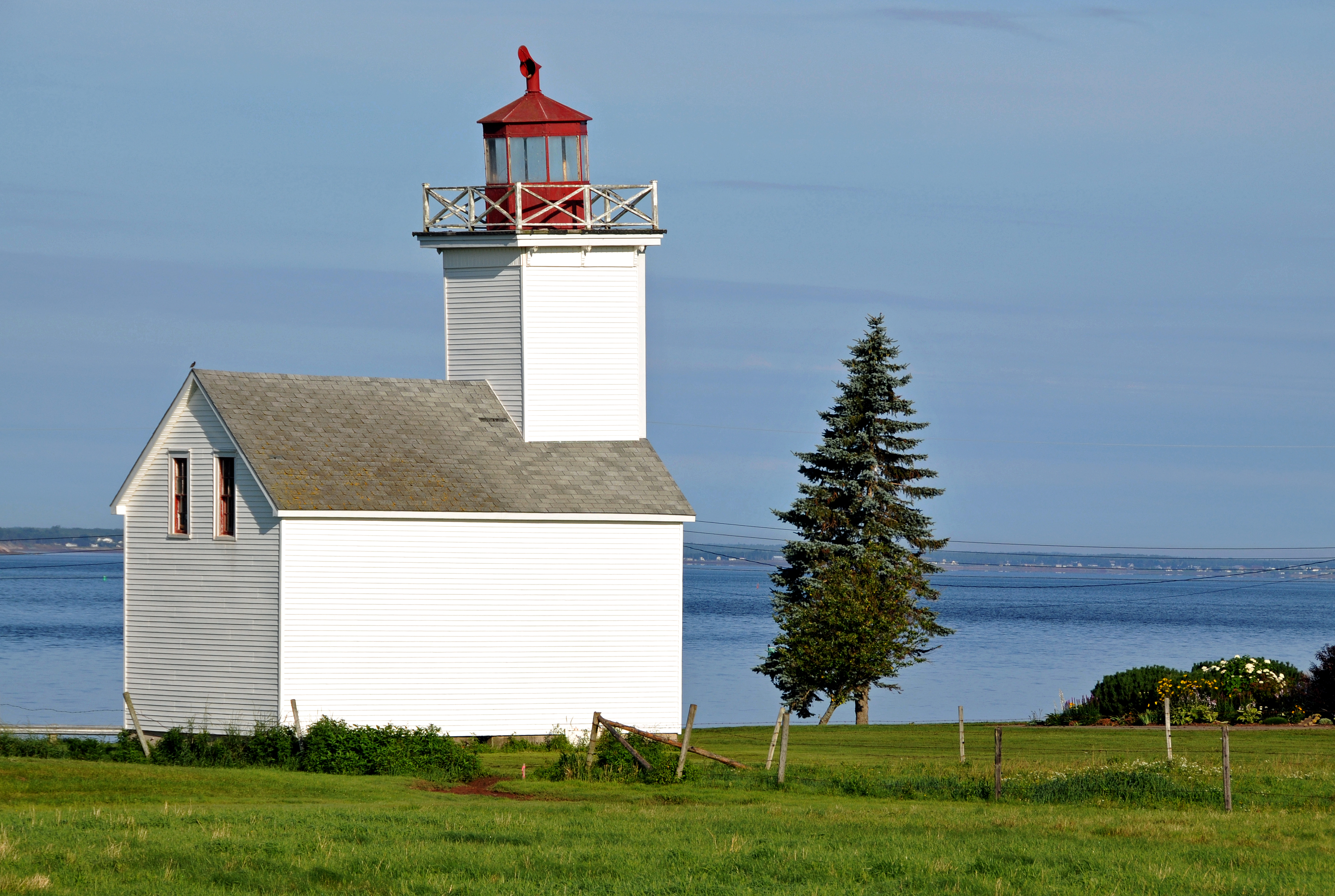
- 1871 Pugwash Lighthouse at the entrance to Pugwash Harbor and the Pugwash River

- Location within Nova Scotia

Location
- Country: Canada
- Province: Nova Scotia
- County: Cumberland

Physical characteristics
- Source
  - location: 45.693749°N 63.784435°W
- Mouth
  - location: Pugwash, Nova Scotia
  - coordinates: 45.851160°N 63.667230°W

The Pugwash River is a river in Nova Scotia, Canada. It flows north into the Northumberland Strait in the village of Pugwash.

== Harbour ==
An 1845 account said, "Pugwash Bay is one of the finest harbours in the county; the shore is so bold that vessels of 500 tons burthen may lie at all times in safety within twenty yards of it : above the channel, which is not more than a quarter of a mile wide, it becomes a beautiful basin, into which the Pugwash river discharges itself.

According to Sailing Directions for Nova Scotia, Bay of Fundy, and South Shore of Gulf of St. Lawrence (1891), "Pugwash Harbor, at the head of the bay and entrance of the river of the same name, is small but quite secure, and has more than sufficient depth of water for any vessel that can pass the bar, on which the depth is 14 feet at low water, in ordinary spring tides. The bar is about 1/2 mile within the entrance of the bay, and a crooked channel, from 100 to 200 yards wide, and through flats of sand and weeds, for the distance of one mile, leads from it to the harbor's mouth. No directions would avail for this channel, and the assistance of one of the able pilots of the place is indispensable, and will be readily obtained in answer to the usual signal.

The "schoolhouse" design Pugwash Lighthouse was built in 1871 on Fishing Point at the entrance to Pugwash Harbour. The last keeper left in 1959, and by 2017 the building was in severe disrepair.

The Port of Pugwash is visited several times per year by bulk carriers used to transport product from the local salt mine.

== Village ==
The village of Pugwash (Pagwe'ak in the Mi'kmaq language) was settled in the later part of the 1700s by settlers from New England who were given land grants by the Nova Scotia government, and later by United Empire Loyalists from the newly independent United States of America. It thrived on shipbuilding and export of lumber to Europe. The 1891 Sailing Directions says, "The town of Pugwash, with its wharves and small wooden English church, stands on the east side of the entrance of the harbor. Immediately within there is a fine little land-locked basin, with a depth of nearly 7 fathoms, in which vessels lie moored in security, to take in cargoes of lumber that are brought down the river." The Canadian Salt Mine Company opened an underground mine in November 1959, with most of the shafts running under the river near the village. As of 2010 the mine was still in operation, although there were doubts about its long-term future.

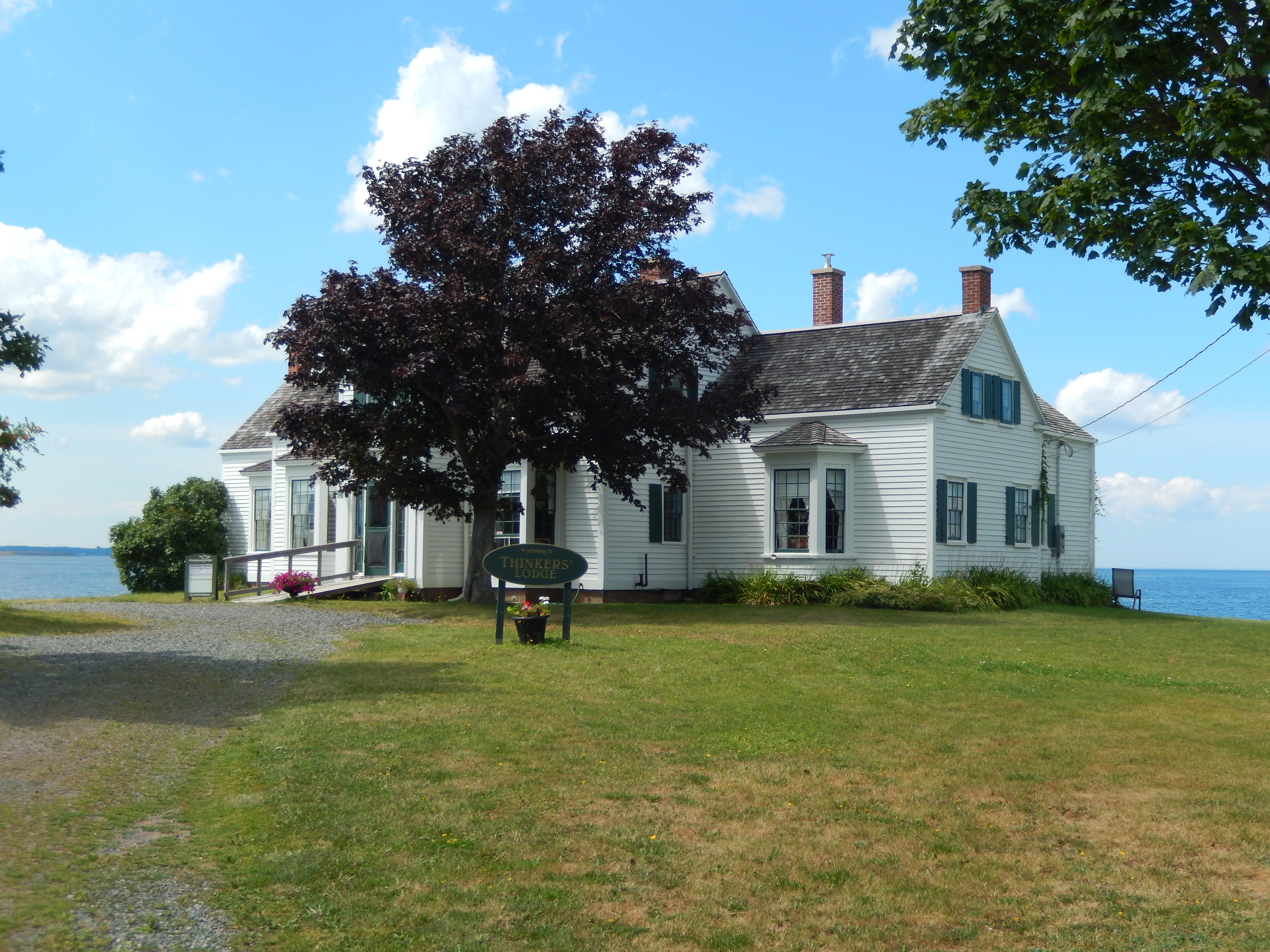
Thinker's Lodge, at the mouth of the Pugwash river, where the first Pugwash Conferences were held

Pugwash is known as the location of the first of the Pugwash Conferences on Science and World Affairs, where Bertrand Russell invited nuclear scientists from the US, USSR and other countries to discuss world peace in July 1957. The conference was held at the Thinker's Lodge, built in the 1830s and owned by the millionaire Cyrus S. Eaton, who was born in Pugwash.

== Estuary ==
The 1891 Sailing Directions says, "Pugwash River, immediately within the harbor, expands into a small lake, 1 1/2 miles long and one mile wide. On the western side the narrow channel of Lime Creek leads to quarries of limestone, unfit for building, but which supply Prince Edward Island as well as the neighboring country with lime. The river continues navigable for small vessels about 2 miles above the lake, and for boats to a distance of 7 miles from its entrance. The Pugwash River Estuary is the largest estuary along Nova Scotia's Northumberland Strait shore. The shoreline is largely unspoilt, although there is some threat of vacation cottage development. The waters are unusually warm.

The estuary contains sandy beaches and salt marshes bordered by forest. The riparian forest contains tsuga (hemlock), betula alleghaniensis (yellow birch) and acer saccharum (sugar maple). The estuary is used by migrating waterfowl such as Canada goose, American black duck, great blue heron and green-winged teal. Shorebirds such as semipalmated sandpiper and willet also rest in the region in the fall and spring. The piping plover (endangered) and Barrow's goldeneye (at risk) are found here. The Nature Conservancy of Canada protects 417 hectares (1,030 acres) of the estuary.

== River ==
The Pugwash river originates in various brooks that run down from the thickly forested Cobequid Mountains, which run east and west along the Cobequid Isthmus and rise to an elevation of about 1,000 feet (300 m). The river rises just south of Highway 104, to the southeast of Oxford. It runs in a northeast direction to Pugwash, a distance of 20 kilometres (12 mi) as the crow flies. The river flows past Birchwood, Hansford and East Hansford, where it receives the outflow from McPherson Lake. It starts to broaden out near Conns Mill, and turns north, then east, then north again before entering Pugwash Basin to the south of Pugwash village.

An October 1881 report said that large shoals of alewife herring (gaspereaux) had been seen in the tideway the previous spring. However, 5 miles (8.0 km) up the river, just at the tideway, the river was dammed for McPherson's saw mill. There was no ladder or other way for fish to get up the river past the 8 feet (2.4 m) dam. It went on, "There are 8 miles of good water between this point and McArthur's saw mill at the foot of McArthur's Lake, but at present, denied both to salmon and gaspereaux. Large shoals of the latter, I am told, were seen in the tide-way last spring. I cannot think they could spawn below the mill, for the water, when I saw it, was thick with sawdust and buckwheat shells. McArthur's dam is without a ladder."

In 1891 the Pugwash fisheries overseer A.M. Wills reported that the smelt fishery in his division was almost a failure. The run was abundant but the fish were too small for market. His report noted, "The main abuses to the fisheries were caused by mill refuse, old trees and sawdust. All the oysters taken in this division were caught in Pugwash River. and men who were raking there reported acres of grounds in the river so covered with sawdust they could not get their rakes down. There are three fish-ways in this division—one at Doyle's mills, and two on the Shinimicas. That at Somer's mills is in good order, but the one in McPherson's mills is choked. A fishway is required in Comer's mill-dam, on the Pugwash River."

== Sources ==
- Canada. Parliament (1891), Sessional Papers of the Parliament of the Dominion of Canada, Printer to the King's Most Excellent Majesty [etc.]
- Clover, Richardson (1891), Sailing Directions for Nova Scotia, Bay of Fundy, and South Shore of Gulf of St. Lawrence, U.S. Government Printing Office, ISBN 9780665438042
- Colombo, John Robert (1984-01-01), Canadian Literary Landmarks, Dundurn, ISBN 978-0-88882-073-0
- Craig Smith (20 November 2012), Conserving the Pugwash Estuary (PDF), Nature Conservancy of Canada
- History, Village of Pugwash
- Martin, Robert Montgomery (1844), The British Colonial Library: Nova Scotia, cape Breton, the Sable islands, New Brunswick, Prince Edward island, the Bermudas, Newfoundland, &c., &c. 1837.-v. 7. British possessions in the Mediterranean: comprising Gibraltar, Malta, and the Ionian islands. 1837, H. G. Bohn
- Pugwash Estuary, NCC: Nature Conservancy of Canada
- "Pugwash Lighthouse", Lighthousefriends.com
- Pugwash River, Natural Resources Canada
- Vieth, Fred. H.D. (1884), Report upon the Condition of the Rivers in Nova Scotia (PDF)
- Waite, P.B. (2011-11-01), Lord of Point Grey: Larry MacKenzie of UBC, UBC Press, ISBN 978-0-7748-4319-5
- Zwicker, Gwen; Veinotte, Cheryl; Marlin, Amanda (September 2010), Pugwash and Area Community Master Plan, Mount Allison University
