= Student Pugwash =

Student Pugwash may refer to:

- International Student/Young Pugwash, an international student organization
- Student Pugwash USA, a US student organization
