= Albert Einstein Peace Prize =

Former peace prize

The Albert Einstein Peace Prize was a peace prize awarded annually since 1980 by the Albert Einstein Peace Prize Foundation. The Foundation dates from 1979, the centenary of the birth of Albert Einstein, and evokes the Russell–Einstein Manifesto which urges nuclear disarmament. It was established, with the sponsorship of the trustees of Einstein's estate, by William M. Swartz (1912–87) a wealthy businessman and the grandfather of activist Aaron Swartz. William M. Swartz was involved in the Pugwash Conferences on Science and World Affairs and established the Foundation in part to support Pugwash. Prize winners, mainly active in nuclear disarmament, receive(d) $50,000.

Winners of the Albert Einstein Peace Prize
Year	Winner	Notes	Refs
1980	Alva Myrdal	For "her outspoken insistence on action by the great powers toward control over their nuclear competition and for her major contributions to the achievement of the Limited Nuclear Test Ban Treaty of 1963, the Nuclear Non-Proliferation Treaty of 1969, and agreements prohibiting the deployment of nuclear weapons on the seabed and in space."	
1981	George F. Kennan	"For his continuing efforts to reduce tension between the United States and the Soviet Union and the world in general." Kennan had not heard of the prize when informed he had won it. His conferral ceremony was attended by members of the Reagan administration and Anatoly Dobrynin.	
1982	McGeorge Bundy, Robert McNamara, Gerard C. Smith	Joint award for opposing pre-emptive nuclear strikes	
1983	Joseph Bernardin	for his part in drafting the U.S. bishops' pastoral letter calling for new arms agreements	
1984	Pierre Trudeau	for working to promote disarmament	
1985	Willy Brandt		
1986	Olof Palme	Awarded posthumously for "wide-ranging efforts on behalf of peace"	
1988	Andrei Sakharov		
1990	Mikhail Gorbachev		
1992	Joseph Rotblat and Hans Bethe	Conferred at a conference marking the fiftieth anniversary of Chicago Pile-1.	
