= International Student/Young Pugwash =

International Student/Young Pugwash (ISYP) is an international organization that promotes awareness and action among students and young professionals in relation to ethical implications of science and technology policy, particularly matters of international security and weapons of mass destruction. It developed from the Pugwash Conferences on Science and World Affairs.

"ISYP not only helps to introduce the younger generation to the principles and objectives of the Pugwash Conferences but also provides a forum for students and young professionals to critically examine and explore the motivations for scientific advancements and the corollaries of technology in the everyday lives of people."

== History ==
Students have been invited as participants in Pugwash Conferences since the early 1970s. Following interest to create a forum specifically for students, student/young Pugwash groups started to form in the late 70s, Student Pugwash USA doing so in 1979. International collaboration among the groups began in 1988 in the Netherlands for the first jointly organized IS/YP conference. Student pre-conferences to the annual Pugwash Conferences began at the 1997 Pugwash Conference held in Norway.

During the 1999 Student/Young Pugwash Conference in Rustenburg, South Africa, representatives from various national Young Pugwash groups "formally endorsed a proposal to establish an international Student/Young Pugwash organisation to improve, expand, and coordinate the activities of national groups.". Sir Joseph Rotblat, one of the original signatories of the Russell-Einstein Manifesto in 1955 and joint recipient of the 1995 Nobel Peace Prize served on the first formally elected interim committee in 2000.

Today, ISYP continues to hold conferences in line with the Pugwash Conferences on Science and World Affairs. Their 11th International Conference, due to be held in Doha, Qatar, has been postponed until further notice due to COVID-19.

== Organization ==
ISYP's members comprise national groups, which themselves may comprise loose or formal collections of school or university chapters, as well as individuals unaffiliated from national young groups. National entities include Student Pugwash USA (SPUSA) and British Pugwash among others.

A new ISYP board was elected in June 2021.
