= Bernard T. Feld =

American nuclear physicist (1919–1993)

- Born: Bernard Taub Feld; December 21, 1919; New York City, U.S.
- Died: February 19, 1993 (aged 73)
- Education: City College of New York (BS); Columbia University (PhD)
- Known for: Helping develop the atomic bomb, later leading an international movement among scientists to banish nuclear weapons
- Scientific career
- Fields: Nuclear physics
- Institutions: Massachusetts Institute of Technology

Bernard Taub Feld (December 21, 1919 – February 19, 1993) was a professor of physics at the Massachusetts Institute of Technology. He helped develop the atomic bomb, and later led an international movement among scientists to banish nuclear weapons.

== Early life and education ==
Feld was born in Brooklyn, New York. He graduated from the City College of New York with a bachelor of science degree in 1939. He began graduate school at Columbia University, but suspended his studies to join the American war effort. He spent the war serving as an assistant to Enrico Fermi and Leó Szilárd working on the Manhattan Project. After World War II, he returned to Columbia University to receive his PhD in 1945 with thesis advisor Willis Lamb.

== Career ==
I was involved in the original sin, and I have spent a large part of my life atoning for it.

— Feld in his involvement with the Manhattan Project

Feld was on the faculty of MIT from 1948 until he retired in 1990. During this time, he was President of the Albert Einstein Peace Prize Foundation, editor of the Bulletin of the Atomic Scientists, and head of the American Pugwash Committee.

Feld was a Ford Foundation Fellow and a visiting scientist at the European Center for Nuclear Research (CERN) in Geneva, Switzerland.

The Pugwash Conferences on Science and World Affairs won the Nobel Peace Prize in 1995. Feld was a leader in these conferences, serving as U.S. Chairman from 1963 to 1973 and as International Chairman from 1973 to 1978. It was in this role that he attracted the anger of Richard Nixon's White House. He was eleventh on Nixon's list of enemies, a fact that pleased him tremendously.

"One month after the election of Ronald Reagan, Feld being an editor of 'Bulletin of the American Atomic Scientists' reported that his publication had decided to move the hands on the Doomsday Clock featured on its cover from seven to four minutes to midnight, because, as 'the year drew to a close, the world seemed to be moving unevenly but inexorably closer to nuclear disaster.' "

== Selected publications ==
=== Articles ===
- Feld, Bernard T. (1953). "Nuclear moments". Annual Review of Nuclear Science. 2 (1): 239–260. Bibcode:1953ARNPS...2..239F. doi:10.1146/annurev.ns.02.120153.001323.
- —— (April 1962). "More Important than Shelters". Bulletin of the Atomic Scientists. 18 (4): 8–11. Bibcode:1962BuAtS..18d...8F. doi:10.1080/00963402.1962.11454340.
- —— (December 1964). "The Nonproliferation of Nuclear Weapons". Bulletin of the Atomic Scientists. 20 (10): 2–6. Bibcode:1964BuAtS..20j...2F. doi:10.1080/00963402.1964.11454726.
- Roper, L. David; Wright, Robert M.; —— (1965). "Energy-Dependent Pion-Nucleon Phase-Shift Analysis". Physical Review. 138 (1B): B190–B210. Bibcode:1965PhRv..138..190R. doi:10.1103/PhysRev.138.B190.
- Janes, G. S.; Levy, R. H.; Bethe, H. A.; —— (1966). "New Type of Accelerator for Heavy Ions". Physical Review. 145 (3): 925–952. Bibcode:1966PhRv..145..925J. doi:10.1103/PhysRev.145.925.
- —— (May 1967). "A Pledge: No First Use". Bulletin of the Atomic Scientists. 23 (5): 46–48. Bibcode:1967BuAtS..23e..46F. doi:10.1080/00963402.1967.11455074.
- —— (April 1974). "The Menace of a Fission Power Economy". Bulletin of the Atomic Scientists. 30 (4): 32–34. Bibcode:1974BuAtS..30d..32F. doi:10.1080/00963402.1974.11458105.
- —— (June 1976). "The consequences of nuclear war". Bulletin of the Atomic Scientists. 32 (6): 10–13. Bibcode:1976BuAtS..32f..10F. doi:10.1080/00963402.1976.11455618.
- —— (March 1979). "Einstein and the politics of nuclear weapons". Bulletin of the Atomic Scientists. 35 (3): 5–16. Bibcode:1979BuAtS..35c...5F. doi:10.1080/00963402.1979.11458591.

=== Books ===
- Feld, B.T.; Feshbach, H.; Goldberger, M.L.; Goldstein, H.; Weisskopf, V.F. (January 1951). Final Report of the Fast Neutron Data Project. Report number: NYO-636, United States Atomic Energy Commission. Washington, D.C.: U. S. Government Printing Office.
- —— (1979). A voice crying in the wilderness: essays on the problems of science and world affairs. Pergamon Press. ISBN 0080231063.
