= Thinkers' Lodge =

National Historic Site of Canada in Pugwash, Nova Scotia

Thinkers' Lodge National Historic Site
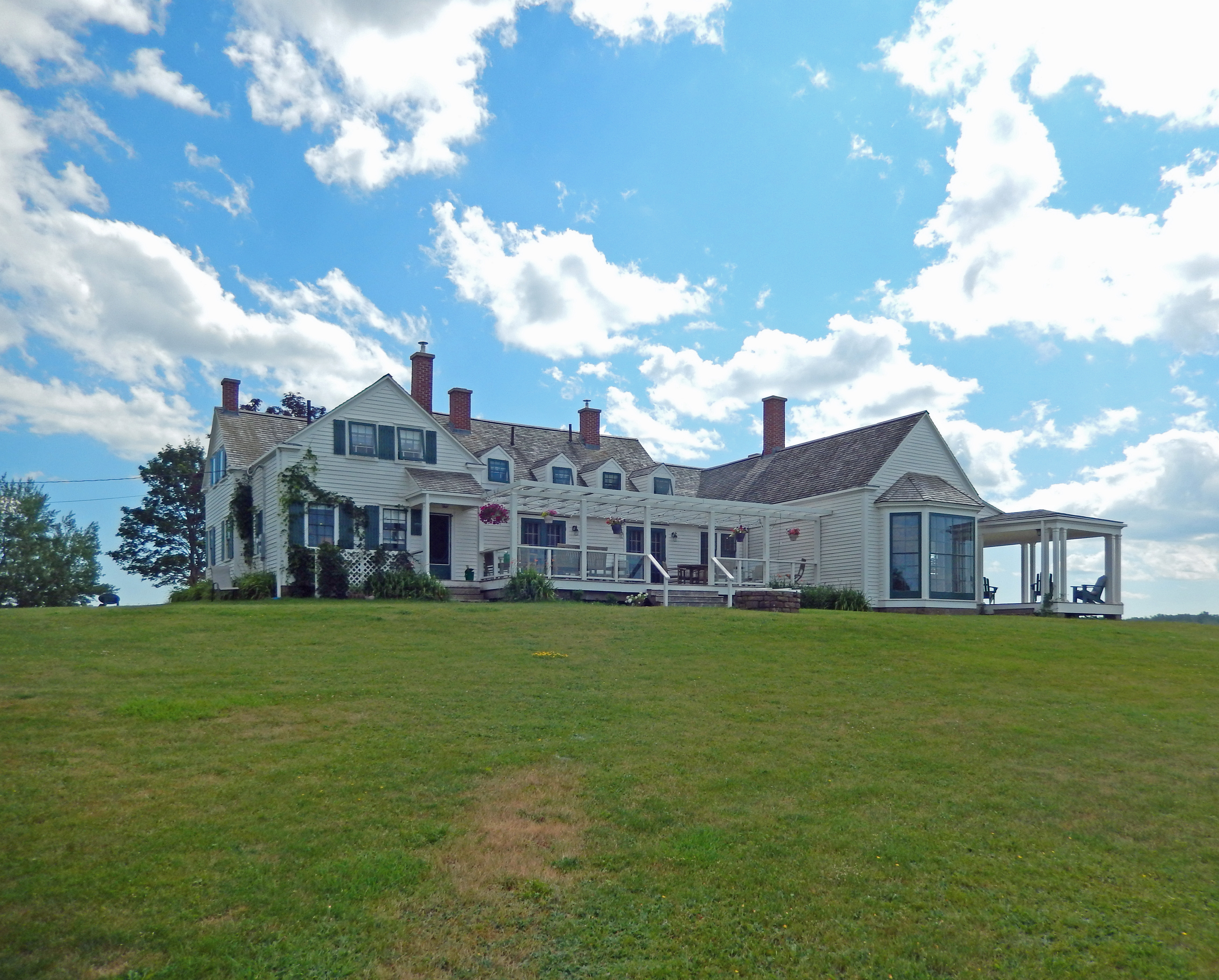
- Thinkers' Lodge National Historic Site in 2017
- Interactive map of Thinkers' Lodge National Historic Site
- Location: 247 Water Street, Pugwash, Nova Scotia, Canada
- Coordinates: 45°51′13″N 63°39′57″W
- Built: 19th century
- Architect: Andrew Cobb (remodelling and expansion)
- Governing body: Parks Canada

National Historic Site of Canada
- Designated: 26 August 2008

Thinkers' Lodge National Historic Site is a historic coastal house and retreat property in Pugwash, Nova Scotia, on a point overlooking the Northumberland Strait. It is best known as the site of the first Pugwash Conference on Science and World Affairs in July 1957, hosted by businessman and philanthropist Cyrus Eaton. The meeting brought together scientists from both sides of the Cold War divide to discuss nuclear weapons and the social responsibilities of science in global affairs, and it helped launch the international Pugwash movement.

== History ==
The main house originated as a seaside residence associated with the Henry Gesner Pineo family. After fires damaged much of Pugwash in 1928 and 1929, Eaton acquired waterfront property and supported redevelopment, including construction of a seawall and creation of parkland. He purchased the home and hired Nova Scotian architect Andrew Cobb to enlarge and remodel it, later adding nearby structures including a lobster canning factory. The parkland and buildings were placed under a charitable organization, the Pugwash Park Commissioners.

From 1930 to 1954, Eaton operated the property as a seaside inn and teahouse, later using it for private retreats. In July 1957, he hosted the first Pugwash Conference, attended by twenty-two participants from ten countries. In August 1961, Soviet cosmonaut Yuri Gagarin, the first human to travel into space, visited Pugwash as Eaton's guest. Gagarin was formally welcomed in Pugwash and visited the lodge, and his presence drew both excitement and controversy due to Cold War politics. In 1995, the Pugwash Conferences and physicist Joseph Rotblat were awarded the Nobel Peace Prize.

The property was designated a National Historic Site of Canada in 2008, and a commemorative plaque was later installed.

== See also ==
- List of National Historic Sites of Canada in Nova Scotia
