= Mario Rocca =

Italian experimental physicist

Mario Agostino Rocca (born in Genoa, Italy, on 27 June 1956) is an Italian experimental physicist. His main contributions are on the experimental measurement of surface phonon spectra, conventional and acoustic surface plasmon dispersion, and gas surface interaction.

== Career ==
Mario Rocca graduated in physics in 1981 at the University of Genoa. For his PhD studies, he moved to the Forschungzentrum Jülich and became Doctor Rerum Naturae at the Rheinisch-Westfälische Technische Hochschule Aachen (RWTH) in 1985 under the supervision of Harald Ibach with a thesis on surface phonon anomalies induced by adsorption of gases. He was a research staff member at the University of Genoa from 1984 to 1992, when he became associate professor. Since 2001, Rocca has been holding the position of full professor of Condensed matter physics. Between 2002 and 2005 he was Deputy Director of the Department of Physics of the University of Genoa. He is vice-chair of the Surface Science Division of the International Union for Vacuum Science, Technique, and Application (IUVSTA) and member of the scientific board of the Italian Union of Scientists for Disarmament. He was editor of Surface Science Reports until 2018, currently he is editor of Applied Surface Science and of Springer Series in Surface Science. He directs the International Summer School on Science Management for Scientists and Engineers. According to a PLOS Biology, Mario Rocca is among the 100.000 top-scientists of the world.

== Selected publications ==
- Mario Rocca Low-energy EELS investigation of surface electronic excitation on metals, Surface Science Reports, 22 (1995), pp. 1-71.
- Diaconescu B. et al. Low energy acoustic plasmons at metal surfaces, Nature, 448 (2007), pp. 57-59.
- Vattuone L.et al. Bridging the structure gap: Chemistry of nanostructured surfaces at well-defined defects, Surface Science Reports, 63 (2008), pp. 101-168.
