= Seagull Pewter =

Canadian pewter manufacturer

- Industry: Pewter manufacturer
- Founded: 1978; 48 years ago in Pugwash, Nova Scotia, Canada
- Founders: John Caraberis; Bonnie Ward
- Fate: Acquired by Royal Selangor (2002)
- Number of employees: 19 (2005)
- Website: seagullpewter.com

Seagull Pewter is a Canadian pewter manufacturer based in Nova Scotia. Founded in 1978 by John Caraberis and Bonnie Ward, the company quickly grew to become one of Canada's most successful pewter companies, and was among the largest in North America at its peak. The company was unable to pay its employees in 2002 and was subsequently acquired by Royal Selangor of Malaysia.

== History ==
Seagull Pewter and Silversmiths was founded in Pugwash, Nova Scotia in 1978 by John Caraberis and Bonnie Ward. The company originally operated out of a farmhouse before moving to a larger plant.

Between 1984 and 1988, Seagull Pewter's sales nearly doubled each year, with the company reporting CA$4.7 million in sales in 1988. By 1994, Seagull Pewter had established itself as one of Canada's most successful pewter companies. Caraberis and Ward attributed the early success of Seagull Pewter to their participation in trade shows. The company presented their products at 40 to 50 trade shows across North America every year.

Having grown quickly into one of the largest pewter manufacturers in North America, Seagull Pewter posed a challenge to the dominance of Malaysian pewter companies in global markets. In Canada, Seagull Pewter had an exclusive retailer who only carried their pewter, alongside other non-pewter giftware. The products were displayed on open racks to allow customers to handle and inspect them, and when purchased they were packed in boxes or sleeves. In 1994, a Seagull Pewter bookmark sold for a retail price of CA$7, a keychain for CA$13, and a Christmas ornament for CA$8.

Seagull Pewter employed 400 people in Cumberland County by 1997. The company had 1,400 items in its line of products in 1999, sold in Canada, the United States, the United Kingdom, France, Germany, the Netherlands, Scandinavia, Israel, Central and South America, and the Caribbean.

On 15 March 2002, Seagull Pewter sent home its entire staff of 170 workers when it was unable to meet payroll. The company asked the provincial government of Nova Scotia to pay their employees for four weeks until the company could be sold, but their request was denied. Employees began voluntarily taking inventory to help prepare the company to be sold, and it subsequently entered receivership. In April 2002, the Malaysian pewter manufacturer Royal Selangor agreed to purchase the company.

In 2005, Seagull Pewter laid off 30 of their unionized employees, leaving them with a total of 19 workers. The company's 65,000 sq ft (6,000 m^{2}) former facility in Pugwash became a powersport vehicle retailer in 2021.

== See also ==
- Amos Pewter
