= Hippocratic Oath for scientists =

A Hippocratic Oath for scientists is an oath similar to the Hippocratic Oath for medical professionals, adapted for scientists. Multiple varieties of such an oath have been proposed. Joseph Rotblat has suggested that an oath would help make new scientists aware of their social and moral responsibilities; opponents, however, have pointed to the "very serious risks for the scientific community" posed by an oath, particularly the possibility that it might be used to shut down certain avenues of research, such as stem cells.

== Development ==
The idea of an oath has been proposed by various prominent members of the scientific community, including Karl Popper, Joseph Rotblat and John Sulston. Research by the American Association for the Advancement of Science (AAAS) identified sixteen different oaths for scientists or engineers proposed during the 20th century, most after 1970.

Popper, Rotblat and Sulston were all primarily concerned with the ethical implications of scientific advances, in particular for Popper and Rotblat the development of the atomic bomb, and believed that scientist, like medics, should have an oath that compelled them to "first do no harm". Popper said: "Formerly the pure scientist or the pure scholar had only one responsibility beyond those which everybody has; that is, to search for the truth. … This happy situation belongs to the past." Rotblat similarly stated: "Scientists can no longer claim that their work has nothing to do with the welfare of the individual or with state policies." He also attacked the attitude that the only obligation of a scientist is to make their results known, the use made of these results being the public's business, saying: "This amoral attitude is in my opinion actually immoral, because it eschews personal responsibility for the likely consequences of one's actions." Sulston was more concerned with rising public distrust of scientists and conflicts of interest brought about by the exploitation of research for profit. The stated intention of his oath was "both to require qualified scientists to cause no harm and to be wholly truthful in their public pronouncements, and also to protect them from discrimination by employers who might prefer them to be economical with the truth."

The concept of an oath, rather than a more detailed code of conduct, has been opposed by Ray Spier, Professor of Science and Engineering Ethics at the University of Surrey, UK, who stated that "Oaths are not the way ahead". Other objections raised at a AAAS meeting on the topic in 2000 included that an oath would simply make scientists look good without changing behaviour, that an oath could be used to suppress research, that some scientists would refuse to swear any oath as a matter of principle, that an oath would be ineffective, that creation of knowledge is separate from how it is used, and that the scientific community could never agree on the content of an oath. The meeting concluded that: "There was a broadly shared consensus that a tolerant (but not patronizing) attitude should be taken towards those developing oaths, but that an oath posed very serious risks for the scientific community which could not be ignored." Nobel laureate Jean-Marie Lehn has said "The first aim of scientific research is to increase knowledge for understanding. Knowledge is then available to mankind for use, namely to progress as well as to help prevent disease and suffering. Any knowledge can be misused. I do not see the need for an oath".

Some of the propositions are outlined below.

=== Karl Popper ===
In 1968, the philosopher Karl Popper gave a talk on "The Moral Responsibility of the Scientist" at the International Congress on Philosophy in Vienna, in which he suggested "an undertaking analogous to the Hippocratic oath". In his analysis he noted that the original oath had three sections: the apprentice's obligation to their teacher; the obligation to carry on the high tradition of their art, preserve its high standards, and pass these standards on to their own students; and the obligation to help the suffering and preserve their confidentiality. He also noted that it was an apprentice's oath, as distinct from a graduation oath. Based on this, he proposed a three-section oath for students, rearranged from the Hippocratic oath to give professional responsibility to further the growth of knowledge; the student, who owes respect to others engaged in science and loyalty to teachers; and the overriding loyalty owed to humanity as a whole.

=== Joseph Rotblat ===
The idea of a Hippocratic Oath for scientists was raised again by Joseph Rotblat in his acceptance speech for the Nobel Peace Prize in 1995, who later expanded on the idea, endorsing the formulation of the Student Pugwash Group:

I promise to work for a better world, where science and technology are used in socially responsible ways. I will not use my education for any purpose intended to harm human beings or the environment. Throughout my career, I will consider the ethical implications of my work before I take action. While the demands placed upon me may be great, I sign this declaration because I recognize that individual responsibility is the first step on the path to peace.

=== John Sulston ===
In 2001, in the scientific journal Biochemical Journal, Nobel laureate John Sulston proposed that "For individual scientists, it may be helpful to have a clear professional code of conduct – a Hippocratic oath as it were". This path would enable scientists to declare their intention "to cause no harm and to be wholly truthful in their public pronouncements", and would also serve to protect them from unethical employers. The concept of an oath was opposed by Ray Spiers of the University of Surrey, an expert on scientific ethics who was preparing a 20-point code of conduct at the time.

=== David King ===
In 2007, the UK government's chief scientific advisor, David King, presented a "Universal Ethical Code for Scientists" at the British Association's Festival of Science in York. Despite being a code rather than an oath, this was widely reported as a Hippocratic oath for scientists. In contrast to the earlier oaths, King's code was not only intended to meet the public demand that "scientific developments are ethical and serve the wider public good" but also to address public confidence in the integrity of science, which had been shaken by the disgrace of cloning pioneer Hwang Woo-suk and by other research-fraud scandals.

Work on the code started in 2005, following a meeting of G8 science ministers and advisors. It was supported by the Royal Society in its response to a public consultation on the draft code in 2006, where they said it would help whistleblowers and the promotion of science in schools.

The code has seven principles, divided into three sections:

Rigour

- Act with skill and care in all scientific work. Maintain up to date skills and assist their development in others.
- Take steps to prevent corrupt practices and professional misconduct. Declare conflicts of interest.
- Be alert to the ways in which research derives from and affects the work of other people, and respect the rights and reputations of others.

Respect

- Ensure that your work is lawful and justified.
- Minimize and justify any adverse effect your work may have on people, animals and the natural environment.

Responsibility

- Seek to discuss the issues that science raises for society. Listen to the aspirations and concerns of others.
- Do not knowingly mislead, or allow others to be misled, about scientific matters. Present and review scientific evidence, theory or interpretation honestly and accurately.

== See also ==
- Code of conduct
- Code of ethics
- Universal code (ethics)
