= Pugwash, Nova Scotia =

Pugwash
- Village
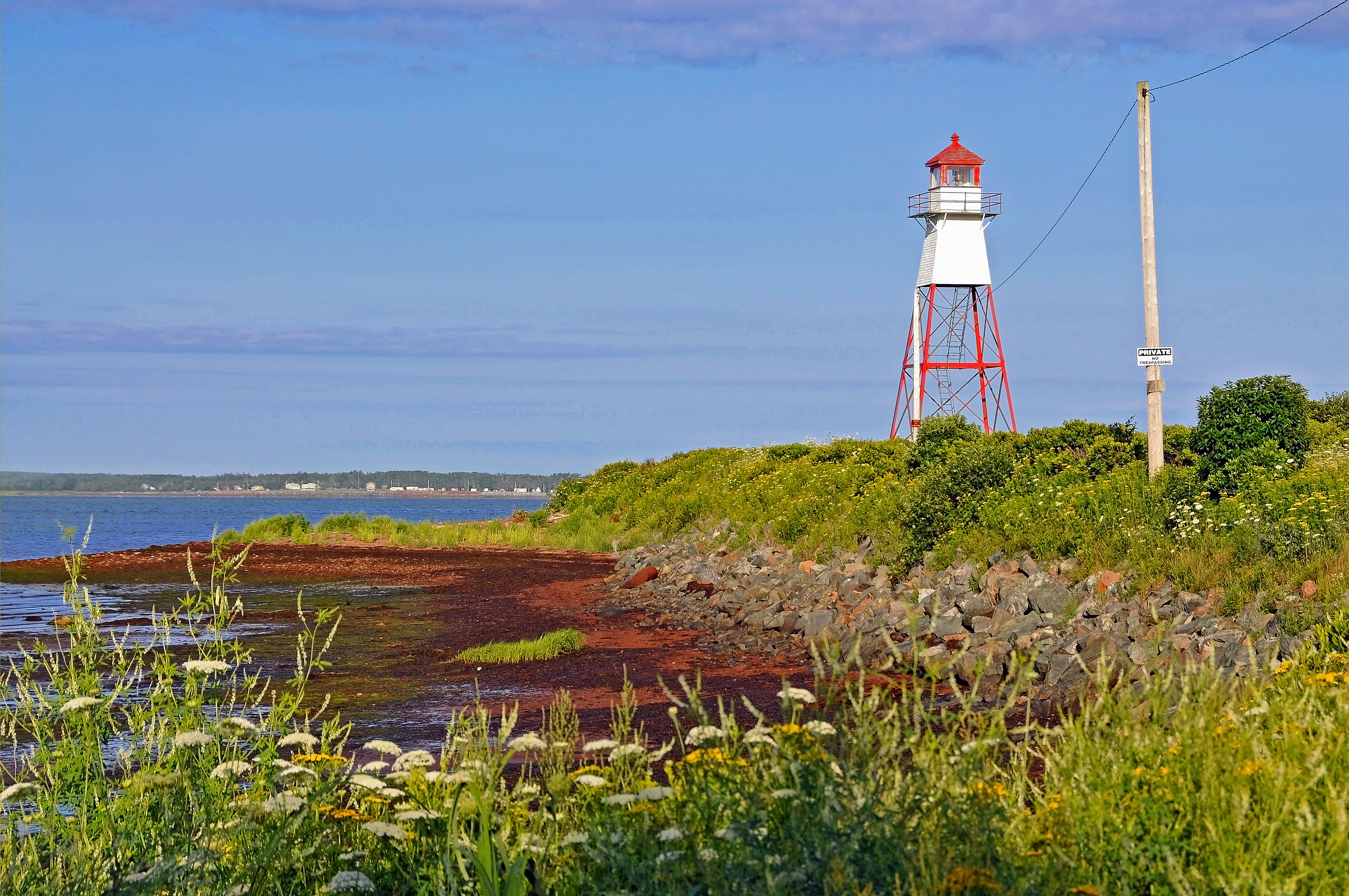
- Pugwash Lighthouse

- Seal
- Motto: World Famous for Peace
- Location of Pugwash in Nova Scotia
- Coordinates: 45.850°N 63.661°W
- Country: Canada
- Province: Nova Scotia
- County: Cumberland
- Founded: 1807
- Electoral Districts Federal: Cumberland-Colchester
- Provincial: Cumberland North

Government
  - Governing Body: Pugwash Village Commission
  - Chair: Brent Wilson
  - MLA: Elizabeth Smith-McCrossin Independent
  - MP: Stephen Ellis (PC)

Area
  - Total: 9.80 km^{2} (3.78 sq mi)
- Elevation: 5 m (16 ft)

Population (2021)
  - Total: 746
  - Density: 76.2/km^{2} (197/sq mi)
- Time zone: ATS
  - Summer (DST): Atlantic Standard Time
- Postal Code: B0K 1L0
- Area code: 902-243
- Website: pugwashvillage.com

Pugwash is an incorporated village in Cumberland County, Nova Scotia, Canada, located on the Northumberland Strait at the mouth of the Pugwash River. It had a population of 746 as of the 2021 census. The name Pugwash is derived from the Mi'kmaq word Pakwesk (also written as Pagwĕsk), meaning "a shoal", in reference to a reef near the mouth of the harbour.

The village is home to fishing, salt mining, small-scale manufacturing, and tourism. Pugwash sits atop a salt deposit measuring 457.2 metres (1,500 ft) thick and is home to the largest underground salt mine in Atlantic Canada, with shipments from its port, as well as by rail from a facility at Oxford Junction.

== History ==
The end of glaciation began 13,500 years ago and ended with the region becoming largely ice-free 11,000 years ago. The earliest evidence of Paleo-Indian settlement in the region follows rapidly after deglaciation.

What is now the Northumberland Shore, including Pugwash, is part of the Mi'kma'ki, the territory of the Mi'kmaq, who have inhabited it for 13,500 years. Early colonial maps of the area describe West Pugwash as "Indian land".

The Chignecto peninsula was settled by Acadians from the 1660s onward, this period ended with the with Expulsion and the Bay of Fundy Campaign during the French and Indian War. Wallace and nearby Tatamagouche were the first villages in Acadia to be burned because they were important ports through which Acadians supplied the French Fortress Louisbourg.

British colonial settlement began with the arrival of the United Empire Loyalists, coming to Chignecto in 1790, and then with the Seaman family, formerly of New York State, moving to farm the mouth of River Phillip in 1795, and ultimately purchasing what became the Pugwash town site from the Mi'kmaw in 1802.

Pugwash is home to many descendants of Highland Scots who immigrated to the region in the 19th century. All street signs in the town are bilingual, with both English and Gaelic translations. The village celebrates its Scottish heritage each July 1, with the annual Gathering of the Clans and Fisherman's Regatta. The Pugwash area, and indeed the entire north shore of Nova Scotia, is famed for its warm waters and sandy beaches. Some claim the waters in summer here are the warmest waters north of the Carolinas in the United States.

The Crowley Memorial was erected in 1870 at Pugwash by the Legislature of Nova Scotia in honour of Mary E. Crowley, who died October 1869, aged 12 years after rescuing her younger brother and sister from a house fire. This is believed to be the first public monument erected to a female in Canada.

In 1898 a fire destroyed the entire town leaving 1,200 people homeless, with The New York Times reporting 200 dwellings, 5 churches, 20 stores, 3 hotels, and several mills" were destroyed, and that the "town was little insured."

Pugwash is famous for being the site of an international conference of scholars organized by Bertrand Russell in 1957, and hosted by Pugwash's native son, steel magnate Cyrus Eaton (1883–1979), at the Thinkers' Lodge on property owned by the Pugwash Park Commission located at the north end of Water Street in the village. This conference brought high-level scientists from both sides of the Cold War divide to state their opposition to nuclear weapons. This meeting was a follow-up to an earlier statement of notables whose signatories had included Albert Einstein and Linus Pauling, the Russell–Einstein Manifesto. The name Pugwash Conferences on Science and World Affairs has since been used to refer to the group.

A myth about the village is that the children's cartoon character Captain Pugwash was named after the international organization that takes its name from the town, but the character, a pirate, in fact first appeared in 1950, several years before the planning of the first Pugwash conference took place.

== Today ==
Visitors entering Pugwash were once greeted by roadside signs announcing that they were entering the "Home of the Thinkers", but the signs have since been replaced by a newer slogan "World Famous for Peace". The switch was made in response to the 1995 awarding of the Nobel Prize to the International Pugwash conferences "for their efforts to diminish the part played by nuclear arms in international politics and in the longer run to eliminate such arms".

The village has an elementary school, named after Cyrus Eaton, as well as a regional high school that draws students from around rural Cumberland County. It has a farmers' market that runs on Saturdays during the summer months.

The Pugwash railway station currently houses the Pugwash Library and North Cumberland Historical Society. The building was designed by Sir Sandford Fleming and completed in 1892, is a registered historic site under the Heritage Property Act of Nova Scotia.

The village was hit by a tornado in 1999, a rarity in Nova Scotia.

== Demographics ==
In the 2021 Census of Population conducted by Statistics Canada, Pugwash had a population of 746 living in 343 of its 458 total private dwellings, a change of 1.4% from its 2016 population of 736. With a land area of 9.8 km^{2} (3.8 sq mi), it had a population density of 76.1/km^{2} (197.2/sq mi) in 2021.

== Economy ==
Pugwash sits on the dividing line between two fishing areas making it the only place on the Northumberland Strait to have two fishing seasons. The first one takes place in May and June and the second in mid-August and mid-October. Many boats fish out of the Pugwash harbour, carrying up to 300 lobster traps at a time.

The village is home of the Canadian Salt Company Mine the only salt mine and only underground mine in Nova Scotia. This mine has been open since 1959. The majority of the mine runs under the Pugwash River, some under solid ground, but not under the village. The plant produces industrial grades salt, salt blocks for farm use and refined salt for domestic consumption. The mine produces approximately 1,200,000 tones of salt per year. The salt is distributed by road or from the company owned ship-loading facility for which large ships can be seen in the harbour from early spring to late autumn.

The creation of pewter crafts and souvenirs is another important industry in Pugwash.

== Government ==
The Village of Pugwash is governed by a Commission composed of a five Commissioners elected at-large, who elect a chair and vice chair from their numbers The chair of the Commission is Brent Wilson. Day-to-day activities are managed by a village clerk who is accountable to Commission. Terms overlap and elections are held every year for one or two seats. The village's operating budget is $$281,100 in fiscal 2023.

Pugwash is also a part of the Municipality of Cumberland. Municipal Council is responsible for all facets of the municipal government, including directly delivered and shared or regional services. Directly delivered services include services such fire, public works, roads, as well as the municipally owned and operated electrical and water utilities. The municipality participates in shared services, such as library services and policing. The municipal operating budget was $7.6 million in the 2019/20 fiscal year.

The provincial legislation that creates and empowers the a village and a municipal council is the Nova Scotia Municipal Government Act.

Pugwash is represented by Elizabeth Smith-McCrossin in the Nova Scotia House of Assembly and Stephen Ellis in Canada's House of Commons.

== Climate ==
Pugwash has a humid continental climate (Dfb) characterized by warm summers with cool nights and long, cold, and snowy winters.

Climate data for Pugwash (1981–2010)
Month	Jan	Feb	Mar	Apr	May	Jun	Jul	Aug	Sep	Oct	Nov	Dec	Year
Record high °C (°F)	18.0 (64.4)	17.0 (62.6)	19.0 (66.2)	25.5 (77.9)	32.2 (90.0)	33.5 (92.3)	36.0 (96.8)	35.0 (95.0)	32.5 (90.5)	26.5 (79.7)	23.0 (73.4)	16.5 (61.7)	36.0 (96.8)
Mean daily maximum °C (°F)	−2.4 (27.7)	−1.3 (29.7)	2.5 (36.5)	8.4 (47.1)	15.5 (59.9)	21.0 (69.8)	24.7 (76.5)	24.1 (75.4)	19.8 (67.6)	13.3 (55.9)	7.3 (45.1)	1.2 (34.2)	11.2 (52.2)
Daily mean °C (°F)	−7.1 (19.2)	−6 (21)	−1.7 (28.9)	4.3 (39.7)	10.6 (51.1)	15.9 (60.6)	19.8 (67.6)	19.4 (66.9)	15.3 (59.5)	9.2 (48.6)	3.7 (38.7)	−2.8 (27.0)	6.7 (44.1)
Mean daily minimum °C (°F)	−11.8 (10.8)	−10.6 (12.9)	−5.9 (21.4)	0.2 (32.4)	5.8 (42.4)	10.8 (51.4)	14.8 (58.6)	14.5 (58.1)	10.8 (51.4)	5.2 (41.4)	0.2 (32.4)	−6.8 (19.8)	2.3 (36.1)
Record low °C (°F)	−33.0 (−27.4)	−37.0 (−34.6)	−27.5 (−17.5)	−13.0 (8.6)	−5.6 (21.9)	−1.0 (30.2)	2.8 (37.0)	3.0 (37.4)	−5.0 (23.0)	−6.0 (21.2)	−20.0 (−4.0)	−29.0 (−20.2)	−37.0 (−34.6)
Average precipitation mm (inches)	88.1 (3.47)	64.8 (2.55)	77.4 (3.05)	81.9 (3.22)	95.3 (3.75)	81.5 (3.21)	72.7 (2.86)	78.5 (3.09)	98.1 (3.86)	103.8 (4.09)	99.7 (3.93)	96.4 (3.80)	1,038.2 (40.87)
Average rainfall mm (inches)	40.1 (1.58)	26.4 (1.04)	41.9 (1.65)	69.6 (2.74)	93.9 (3.70)	81.5 (3.21)	72.7 (2.86)	78.5 (3.09)	98.1 (3.86)	103.8 (4.09)	91.2 (3.59)	57.7 (2.27)	855.4 (33.68)
Average snowfall cm (inches)	47.9 (18.9)	38.5 (15.2)	35.5 (14.0)	12.3 (4.8)	1.4 (0.6)	0.0 (0.0)	0.0 (0.0)	0.0 (0.0)	0.0 (0.0)	0.0 (0.0)	8.5 (3.3)	38.8 (15.3)	182.8 (72.0)
Average precipitation days (≥ 0.2 mm)	12.2	10.3	12.7	13.9	14.3	13.0	11.8	11.3	11.9	14.0	15.5	14.0	154.8
Average rainy days (≥ 0.2 mm)	4.8	4.0	7.5	12.5	14.3	13.0	11.8	11.3	11.9	14.0	14.1	8.2	127.4
Average snowy days (≥ 0.2 cm)	7.7	6.7	6.3	2.7	0.25	0.0	0.0	0.0	0.0	0.0	2.1	6.3	32.0
Source: Environment Canada

== Notable people ==
- Charles Aubrey Eaton (1868–1953), clergyman and politician who served in the United States House of Representatives, representing the New Jersey's 4th congressional district from 1925 to 1933, and the 5th district from 1933 to 1953
- Cyrus S. Eaton
- Norman MacKenzie
- James Dewar, inventor of Twinkies

== Parks ==
- Gulf Shore Provincial Park
- Heather Beach Provincial Park

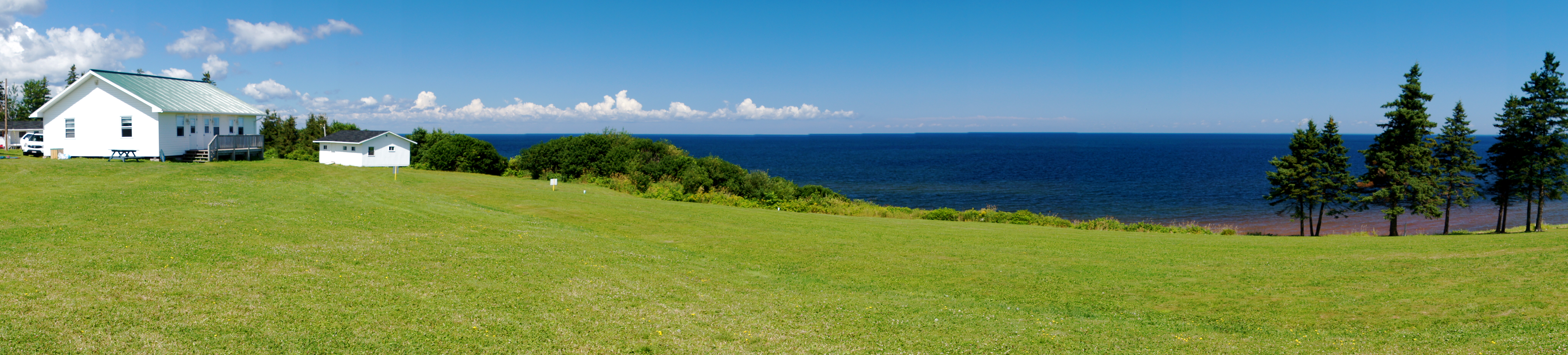
The Northumberland Strait from the Gulf Shore Rd in the Pugwash area

== See also ==
- Seagull Pewter
