= Royal Selangor =

Malaysian pewter company

Royal Selangor International Sdn Bhd
- Company type: Private limited company
- Industry: Pewter, Gifts
- Founded: 1885
- Headquarters: Kuala Lumpur, Malaysia
- Area served: Worldwide distribution
- Products: Pewter, jewelry and silverware
- Subsidiaries: Selberan Jewellery; Comyns; Selcraft Sdn Bhd; Sculptors Dream
- Website: www.royalselangor.com

Royal Selangor International Sdn Bhd (doing business as Royal Selangor) is a Malaysian pewter manufacturer and retailer, the largest of its type in the world.

== History ==
Founded in 1885 by Yong Koon (simplified Chinese: 杨堃; traditional Chinese: 楊堃; pinyin: yáng kūn) in his little shop called Ngeok Foh (Jade Peace), Yong Koon handcrafted pewter objects mainly for ceremonial use, such as joss stick holders, incense burners and candle holders for altars of Chinese homes and temples. The pewter objects sold by Yong Koon were polished with "stone leaf" (Tetracera scandens), a wild tropical leaf of a fine, abrasive nature. With the arrival of British colonials, the offering expanded to include tankards, ashtrays and tea services. The brand was then known as Royal Selangor Pewter.

In the 1970s, the company started exporting, first to Singapore and Hong Kong and then to Australia. Towards the 1980s, the market expanded into Europe and later into Japan.

In 1992, the company changed its name to Royal Selangor to reflect its endorsement from Sultan Salahuddin, the Sultan of Selangor, dropping 'pewter' from its company name as its product range had expanded to include items from other materials.

In 2002, Royal Selangor purchased the Canadian company Seagull Pewter.

== World's Largest Pewter Tankard ==
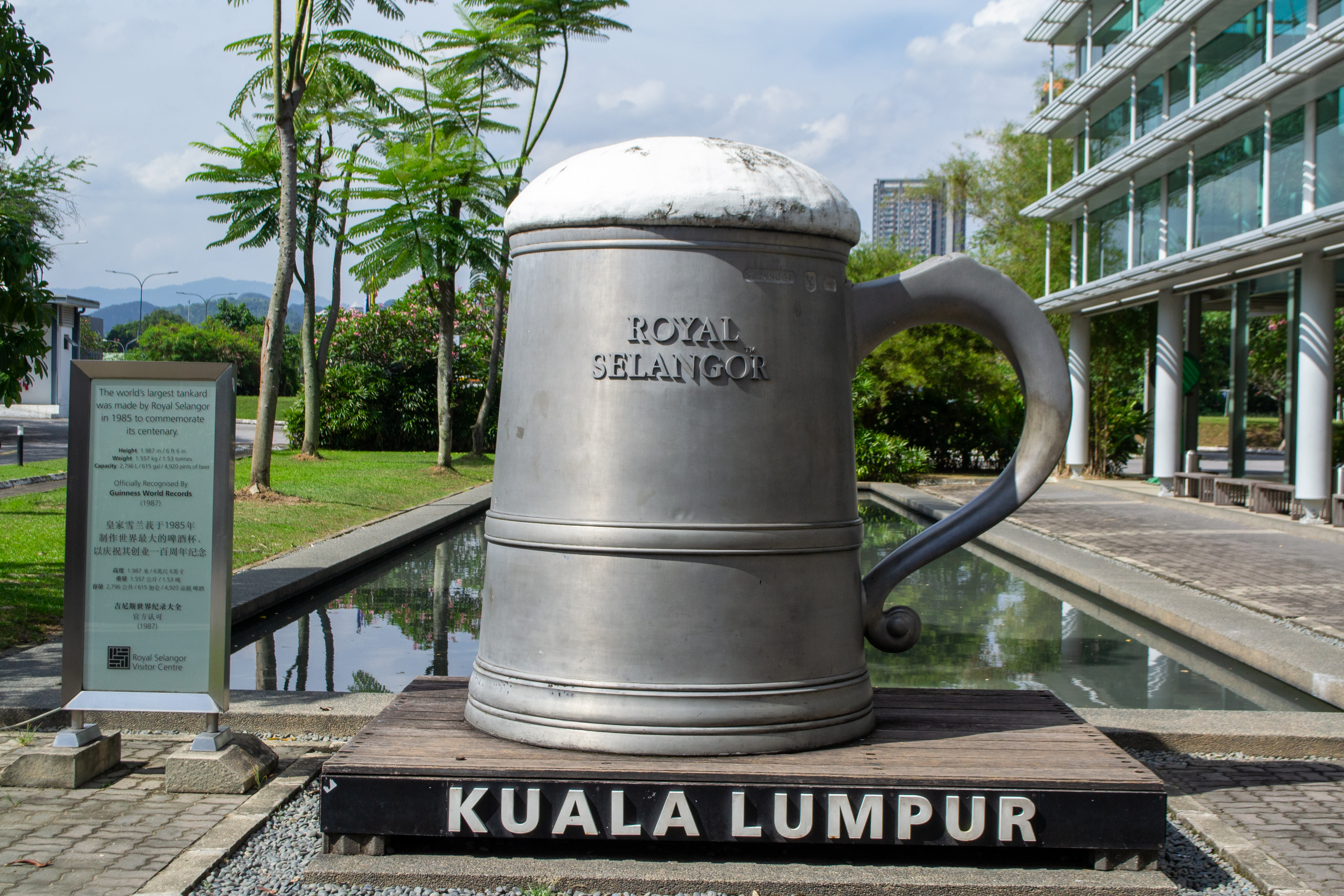
The World's Largest Pewter Tankard on display at the Royal Selangor Visitor Centre in Kuala Lumpur, Malaysia.

The world's largest pewter tankard, recognized by the Guinness Book of Records, was made by Royal Selangor in 1985 to commemorate its centenary. Displayed at Royal Selangor headquarters in Setapak, it is 1.987 metres tall, weighs 1,557 kg and has a capacity of 2,796 litres. The giant tankard has travelled around the world to places such as Canada, Australia, Singapore and China.

== Products ==
The company offers over a thousand tableware and gift items, from tankards and tea sets, to photo frames, desk accessories and wine accessories. Distributed worldwide from its base in Kuala Lumpur, the company has more than 40 shops worldwide. It exports to more than 20 countries, with retail outlets in London, Toronto, Melbourne, Tokyo, Shanghai, Hong Kong, Sydney and Singapore.

Royal Selangor is found in stores such as Harrods and John Lewis in the United Kingdom, David Jones and Myer in Australia, Wako and Mitsukoshi in Japan. Represented in five continents with eight offices worldwide, it is also represented by its website.

In 1989 and 1991, Royal Selangor received the Design Plus award at the Frankfurt International Gift Fair. In 1997, Royal Selangor received the Gift of the Year Award in the licensed gifts category, from the Giftware Association of the United Kingdom.

== Collaborations ==
=== Museums ===
- British Museum
- Victoria & Albert Museum

=== Designers ===
- Erik Magnussen
- Jarrod Lim
- Freeman Lau
- Viewport Studio
- Nathan Yong
