= Amos Pewter =

Canadian pewter company

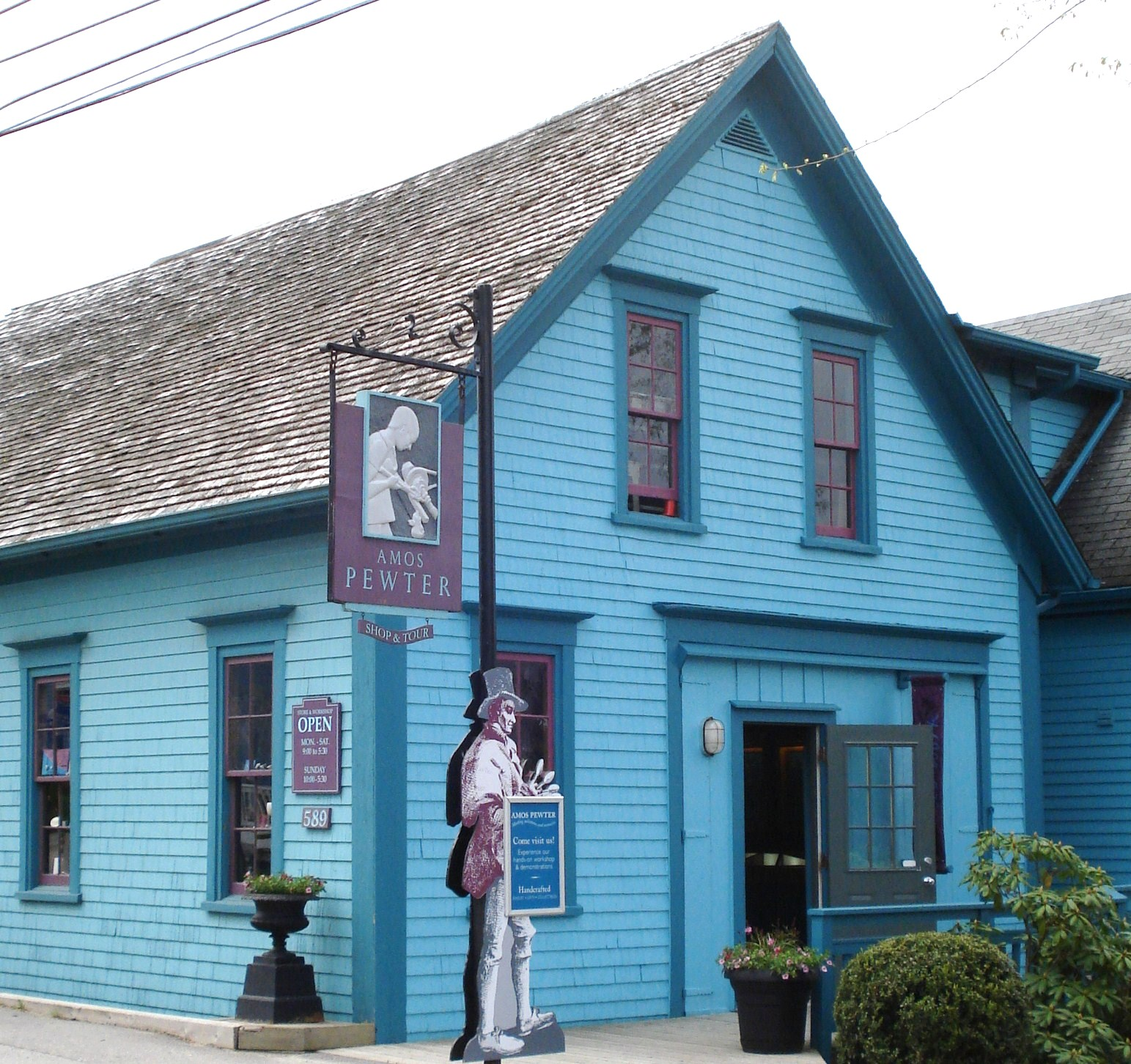
- Mahone Bay location
- Industry: Pewter manufacturer
- Founded: 1974; 52 years ago
- Founders: Greg Amos; Suzanne Amos
- Headquarters: Mahone Bay, Nova Scotia, Canada
- Website: amospewter.com

Amos Pewter is a Canadian pewter manufacturer based in Mahone Bay, Nova Scotia. Established in 1974, the company has five retail locations across Atlantic Canada.

== History ==
Amos Pewter was established in 1974 by Greg and Suzanne Amos, who learned their trade in the early 1970s from the craftsman Ivan Crowell in New Brunswick. After moving to Mahone Bay, they purchased a historic building there on the waterfront and set up a workshop and retail location.

In 1999, the company expanded their location in Mahone Bay to include a pewter-making exhibit. Greg and Suzanne Amos sold Amos Pewter to Don and Lynn Sheehan in 2006, who established a second store in Halifax in 2010. They opened their first store outside of Nova Scotia two years later, in Charlottetown. Their fifth location at Peggy's Cove opened in 2013. The company also operates a retail location at Halifax Stanfield International Airport.

During the restoration of the Bluenose II in 2012, a commemorative coin created by Amos Pewter was placed in each of the ship's masts. Three pieces by Amos Pewter are held in the Royal Ontario Museum.

== Products ==
Amos Pewter creates a variety of pewter products at their workshop in Mahone Bay, including jewellery, ornaments, sculptures, and tableware. Their products are cast in moulds and finished by hand. They are known for their line of Christmas ornaments, releasing a different design of collector ornament every year since 1975.

== See also ==
- Seagull Pewter
