= Italian Union of Scientists for Disarmament =

Italian association

The Italian Union of Scientists for Disarmament (Italian: Unione Scienziati per il Disarmo) is an association established in 1982 with the purpose of providing information and analysis of arms control and disarmament. Members of the association believe that this task is part of the social responsibility of scientists.

The issues it addresses include nuclear arms control and disarmament, nuclear proliferation, consequences of nuclear explosions, control of fissile material, developments of military technology, conventional disarmament, chemical and biological disarmament, and general problems of conflict and conflict resolution. Members share their views with Italian policy-makers and opinion-makers.

It organizes conferences and meetings, including the biennial Castiglioncello conference, courses and seminars at Italian universities, and courses for high-school teachers.

It promotes the establishment of inter-departmental centers of research affiliated to Italian Universities, and has actively collaborated for many years with the CIRP-UniBa (Centro Interdipartimentale di Ricerche sulla Pace, University of Bari).

It collaborates with international organizations of scientists and other Italian institutions, such as Archivio Disarmo (Roma) and Forum per i Problemi della Pace e della Guerra (Firenze). Members of USPID participate in Pugwash and ISODARCO meetings.

In 1995 it began a standing collaboration with Landau Network-Centro Volta, in Como. This institution organizes, together with UNESCO and under the sponsorship of the Italian Ministry of Foreign Affairs, conferences and research projects on topics including disarmament, non-proliferation and scientific-technological aspects of international security.
