= Cyrus S. Eaton =

Canadian-American banker, businessman and philanthropist (1883–1979)

Cyrus Eaton
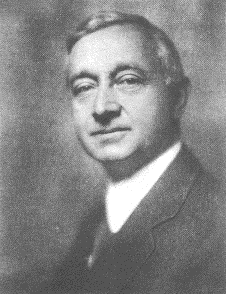
- Eaton in 1929
- Born: Cyrus Stephen Eaton; December 27, 1883; Cumberland County, Nova Scotia, Canada
- Died: May 9, 1979 (aged 95); Northfield, Ohio, US; buried: Deep Cove, Nova Scotia, Canada
- Education: McMaster University
- Occupation: Businessman

Cyrus Stephen Eaton Sr. (December 27, 1883 – May 9, 1979) was a Canadian-American investment banker, businessman and philanthropist, with a career that spanned 70 years.

For decades Eaton was one of the most powerful financiers in the American Midwest, and he was a colourful and often-controversial figure. He was chiefly known for his longevity in business, for his opposition to the dominance of eastern financiers in the America of his day, for his occasionally ruthless financial manipulations, for his passion for world peace and for his outspoken criticism of United States Cold War policy. He funded and helped organize the first Pugwash Conferences on World Peace, in 1957. He wrote numerous articles and essays on political and economic subjects—"Investment Banking: Competition or Decadence?", "Rationalism Versus Rockefeller", and "A Capitalist Looks at Labour" being some of the best known.

== Life and career ==
Eaton was born on December 27, 1883, on a farm near the village of Pugwash in Cumberland County, Nova Scotia, Canada. Besides farming, his father, Joseph Howe Eaton, ran a small general store and the district post office. Cyrus's uncle was Charles Aubrey Eaton who led a Cleveland congregation that included Mr. and Mrs. John D. Rockefeller Sr. who Cyrus Eaton met in 1901 when he was 17 and later became his protégé after Rockefeller hired the young Eaton to be a messenger in Rockefeller's private telegraph room.

Eaton left Nova Scotia in 1899 to attend Woodstock College, a Baptist-affiliated prep school in Woodstock, Ontario. Later he enrolled at McMaster University, a Baptist university, then located in Toronto, where he studied philosophy and finance, intending to enter the Baptist ministry. He earned his bachelor of arts degree in 1905 with a major in philosophy.

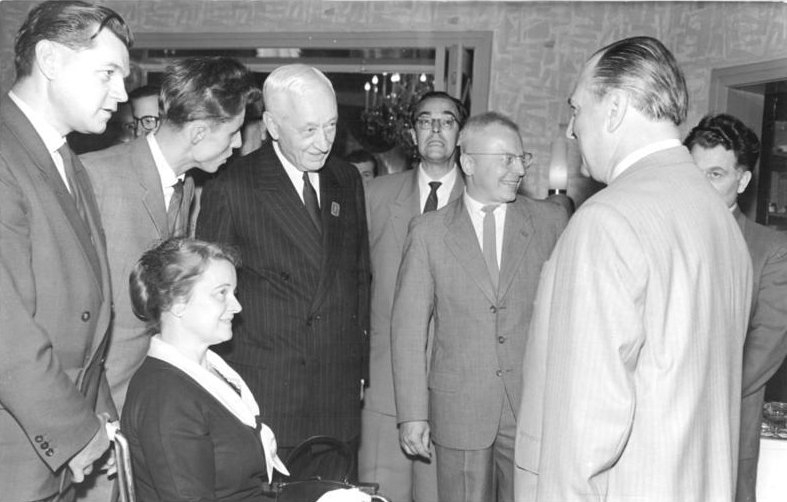
Cyrus Eaton in Leipzig, Germany (June 1960)

After graduating from McMaster he moved to Cleveland and went to work for the East Ohio Gas Company. This was one of many businesses associated with John D. Rockefeller. After working with East Ohio Gas and Rockefeller for two years, he established his own business in 1907, developing gas utilities which at the time were relatively underdeveloped and unconsolidated in Canada. He managed to secure natural-gas franchises in Manitoba, Canada, representing a group of New York investors. The syndicate was unable to complete its financing and went defunct. However, the Manitoba government was sufficiently impressed to allow Eaton to retain the franchises. Eaton formed a new holding company, the Canada Gas & Electric Corp, later consolidated into the Continental Gas & Electric Corp. in 1913.

After spending several years travelling, Eaton settled in Cleveland in 1913 and became active in many businesses. Eaton joined the Otis & Co. banking firm in 1916. In 1926 he established the investment vehicle Continental Shares, Inc., a closed end trust. In 1927 he formed Republic Steel, the 3rd-largest U.S. steel company. His business had a complex structure which some felt to be too highly leveraged. His 1929 wealth was an estimated $100 million, most of which was lost in the Great Depression.

Eaton rebuilt his fortune in the 1940s and 1950s, becoming a director (1943), then board chairman (1954), of the Chesapeake and Ohio Railway, and also board chairman of the West Kentucky Coal Co. (1953).

Eaton married twice. First, in 1907, Margaret House (1887–1956); then Anne Kinder Jones (1922–1992) in 1957. He had seven children: Margaret Grace, Mary Adelle, Elizabeth Ann, Anna Bishop, Cyrus S. Jr., Augusta Farlee, and MacPherson.

== Tower International ==
To effect the trading of sheet metal from Eaton's Republic Steel in Cleveland for chrome ore primarily from the Kazakh SSR in the Soviet Union in 1954 during the United States' McCarthyism era, Eaton's son Cyrus Eaton Jr., established the Canadian firm Tower International in Montreal because direct trade between the US and the Soviet Union was unthinkable. In the early 1960s, Tower International proposed building numerous buildings in central Moscow including four skyscrapers which would house Moscow's International Trade Center, an eighteen hole golf course, a 600-room hotel, a 2,000-seat conference centre, numerous restaurants, apartments for foreigners, and an office complex. In early 1969, Armand Hammer obtained control of Tower International through which Hammer would have a controlling majority stake in Tower International in exchange for Hammer's Occidental Petroleum assuming the debts of Tower International and Eaton receiving 45% of any profits from Tower International's future projects. (Note: Later, during the 1980s perestroika, Cyrus Eaton World Trade Ltd. contributed to the opening up of trade between the Soviet Union and Canada.) In July 1972, Armand Hammer's financial wizard Dorman Commons, who was the chief financial officer at Occidental Petroleum in Los Angeles, estimated that the Moscow International Trade Center project would cost $100 million and would be a complete flop if détente failed. On July 31, 1972, Commons voiced his thoughts with Hammer after which Hammer fired Commons effective August 1, 1972. During détente in July 1972, Armand Hammer negotiated a 20-year agreement with Brezhnev of the Soviet Union that was signed by Hammer in April 1973 in which the Hammer controlled firms Occidental Petroleum and Tower International would export to the Soviet Union, and later Russia, phosphate, which Occidental mined in northern Florida, in return for the Soviet Union, and later Russia, exporting to Hammer's firms natural gas that would be converted into ammonia, potash, and urea. This fertilizer deal was to continue until Hammer's 100th birthday in 1998. JaxPort at the Port of Jacksonville in Jacksonville, Florida, was the United States port through which this trade occurred.

== Philanthropy ==
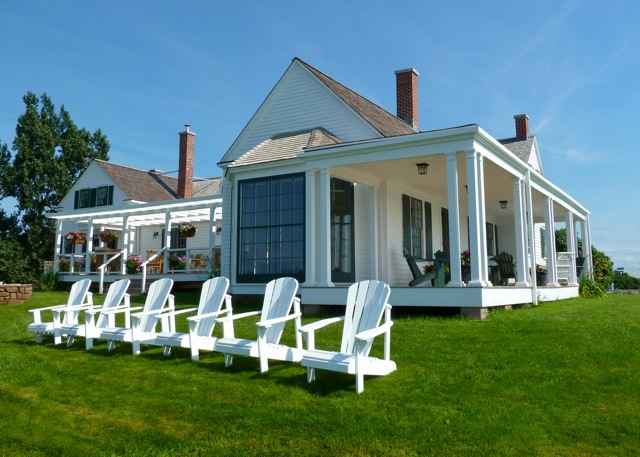
Thinkers' Lodge, Pugwash, Nova Scotia, Canada; site of the first Pugwash conference in 1957

In 1920, Eaton founded the Cleveland Museum of Natural History.

The Russell–Einstein Manifesto was issued in London on July 9, 1955, by Bertrand Russell in the midst of the Cold War. It highlighted the dangers posed by nuclear weapons and called for world leaders to seek peaceful resolutions to international conflict. The signatories included eleven preeminent intellectuals and scientists, including Albert Einstein, who signed it just days before his death on April 18, 1955. A few days after the release, philanthropist Eaton offered to sponsor a conference (called for in the manifesto) in Pugwash, Nova Scotia, Eaton's birthplace. This conference was to be the first of the Pugwash Conferences on Science and World Affairs, held in July 1957.

Besides financial support for the Pugwash Conferences, Eaton provided funds to support education in Nova Scotia, particularly in Pugwash and to Acadia University. He supported the establishment of a game sanctuary in Nova Scotia on the Aspotogan Peninsula (his summer home was in Blandford, Nova Scotia where he had his ashes buried). He donated money for the doors of St. Bartholmus Church in Blandford and 12 acres (4.9 hectares) of land in Northfield, Ohio, for the Lee Eaton Elementary School, named in memory of his daughter. He was also a financial supporter of McMaster University, the YWCA, the Cleveland Museum of Natural History and Case Western Reserve University. Upon his death in 1979, his Blandford estate was purchased by a group of businessmen from Germany. His summer home was destroyed in a fire in 2015.

=== Awards ===
Eaton's 1950s efforts at rapprochement with the Soviet Union won him the 1960 Lenin Peace Prize. He was elected a fellow of the American Academy of Arts and Sciences in 1958, and was the recipient of an honorary degree from Bowling Green State University in 1969. The Pugwash Conferences and their chairman, Joseph Rotblat, were awarded the Nobel Peace Prize in 1995.

== Death ==
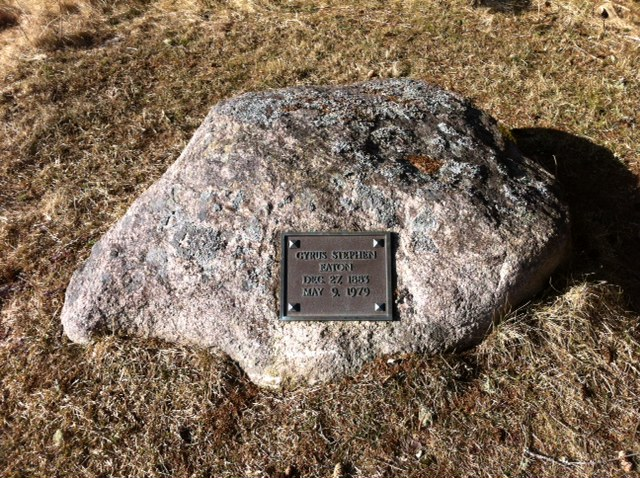
Gravesite of the ashes of Cyrus Eaton, Deep Cove, Nova Scotia

Eaton died on May 9, 1979, at his home, Acadia Farm, in Northfield, Ohio. He had his ashes buried in Blandford, Nova Scotia.

== Legacy ==
- Cyrus Eaton Elementary School, Pugwash, Nova Scotia
- Lee Eaton Elementary School, Northfield Village, Ohio (The primary school on Ledge Rd. sits on twelve acres of land donated by Mr. Cyrus Eaton in memory of his first born daughter Margret G. Eaton also known as Lee by the family.)
- Eaton Estate, a housing development in Northfield Village, Ohio, which is built on the site of his former home Acadia Farm.

He is the subject of Carol Moore-Ede's 1977 documentary film The Prophet from Pugwash.
