= Student Pugwash USA =

- Founded: 1979
- Type: Public charity in the United States of America
- Purpose: Ethics; STEM; Social responsibility
- Location: Washington, D.C.
- Origins: Pugwash Conferences on Science and World Affairs
- Product: Conferences, Student Chapters, Multimedia, Fellowships
- Method: Student involvement
- Website: http://www.studentpugwash.org/

Student Pugwash USA is the U.S. affiliate of International Student/Young Pugwash, and the US student affiliate of the Pugwash Conferences on Science and World Affairs, recipients of the 1995 Nobel Peace Prize.

As an educational nonprofit organization, SPUSA does not adopt advocacy positions on policy or political issues or candidates, but seeks to foment student leadership and incubate groups of committed activists who go on to take action separate from SPUSA activities. The organization posits that, in order to create effective social change, students must first understand the issues at stake, then contemplate their ethical and moral responsibility to themselves and to society as a whole. Its stated purpose is not to advance a particular ethical viewpoint regarding scientific and technological issues, but rather to encourage students to consider ethics when thinking about the role of science and technology in society. SPUSA is open to all viewpoints and approaches to these discussions, but with a firm commitment to accurate science and factual information. For example, early SPUSA panel debates were held regarding the causes of climate change, before there was consensus in the scientific community; afterwards, that debate was considered resolved and no longer appropriate, but events continue discussing which approaches to take in response to current information.

== Activities ==
Activities have included regional, national and international conferences, speaker events at campuses through a national chapter network, and compilation of issue briefs on scientific and technical issues of social importance.

== See also ==
- Pugwash Conferences on Science and World Affairs
- International Student/Young Pugwash
