= Russell–Einstein Manifesto =

1955 manifesto on the dangers of nuclear weapons

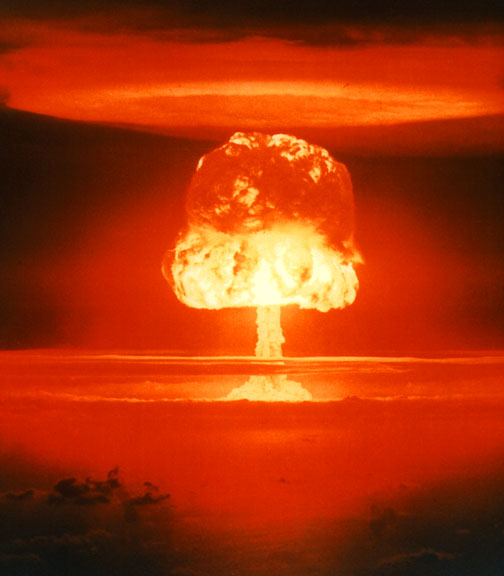
"Here, then, is the problem which we present to you, stark and dreadful and inescapable: Shall we put an end to the human race; or shall mankind renounce war?" ~ Bertrand Russell

The Russell–Einstein Manifesto was issued in London on 9 July 1955 by Bertrand Russell in the midst of the Cold War. It highlighted the dangers posed by nuclear weapons and called for world leaders to seek peaceful resolutions to international conflict. The signatories included eleven pre-eminent intellectuals and scientists, including Albert Einstein, who signed it shortly before his death on 18 April 1955. Shortly after the release, philanthropist Cyrus S. Eaton offered to sponsor a conference—called for in the manifesto—in Pugwash, Nova Scotia, Eaton's birthplace. The conference, held in July 1957, became the first of the Pugwash Conferences on Science and World Affairs.

== Background ==
The first detonation of an atomic weapon took place on 16 July 1945 in the desert north of Alamogordo, New Mexico. On 6 August 1945, the US dropped the Little Boy bomb on the Japanese city of Hiroshima. Three days later, it dropped the Fat Man bomb on Nagasaki. At least 100,000 civilians were killed outright by these two bombings.

On 18 August 1945, the Glasgow Forward published "The Bomb and Civilisation," the first known recorded comment by Bertrand Russell on atomic weapons, which he began composing the day Nagasaki was bombed. It contained threads that would later appear in the manifesto:

The prospect for the human race is sombre beyond all precedent. Mankind are faced with a clear-cut alternative: either we shall all perish, or we shall have to acquire some slight degree of common sense. A great deal of new political thinking will be necessary if utter disaster is to be averted.

After learning of the bombing of Hiroshima and seeing an impending nuclear arms race, Joseph Rotblat, the only scientist to leave the Manhattan Project on moral grounds, remarked that he "became worried about the whole future of mankind."

Over the years that followed, Russell and Rotblat worked on efforts to curb nuclear proliferation, collaborating with Albert Einstein and other scientists to compose what became known as the Russell–Einstein Manifesto.

== Press conference, 9 July 1955 ==
The manifesto was released during a press conference at Caxton Hall, London. Rotblat, who chaired the meeting, described it as follows:

It was thought that only a few of the Press would turn up and a small room was booked in Caxton Hall for the Press Conference. But it soon became clear that interest was increasing and the next larger room was booked. In the end the largest room was taken and on the day of the Conference this was packed to capacity with representatives of the press, radio and television from all over the world. After reading the Manifesto, Russell answered a barrage of questions from members of the press, some of whom were initially openly hostile to the ideas contained in the Manifesto. Gradually, however, they became convinced by the forcefulness of his arguments, as was evident in the excellent reporting in the Press, which in many cases gave front page coverage.

Russell had begun the conference by stating:

I am bringing the warning pronounced by the signatories to the notice of all the powerful Governments of the world in the earnest hope that they may agree to allow their citizens to survive.

== Synopsis ==
The manifesto called for a conference where scientists would assess the dangers posed to the survival of humanity by weapons of mass destruction. Emphasis was placed on the meeting being politically neutral. It extended the question of nuclear weapons to all people and governments. One particular phrase is quoted often, including by Rotblat upon receipt of the Nobel Peace Prize in 1995:^{:320}

Remember your humanity, and forget the rest.

== The beginnings of the Pugwash Conferences ==
The manifesto called for an international conference, and was originally planned by Jawaharlal Nehru to be held in India. This was delayed by the outbreak of the Suez Crisis. Aristotle Onassis offered to finance a meeting in Monaco, but this was rejected. Instead, Cyrus Eaton, a Canadian industrialist who had known Russell since 1938, offered to finance the conference in his hometown of Pugwash, Nova Scotia. The Russell–Einstein Manifesto became the Pugwash Conferences' founding charter. The first of the conferences was held in July 1957 in Pugwash.

== Signatories to the manifesto ==
- Max Born
- Percy W. Bridgman
- Albert Einstein
- Leopold Infeld
- Frédéric Joliot-Curie
- Hermann J. Muller
- Linus Pauling
- Cecil F. Powell
- Joseph Rotblat
- Bertrand Russell
- Hideki Yukawa

With the exception of Infeld, all of the signatories of the Russell–Einstein Manifesto are Nobel Laureates, although Rotblat was not at the time.

== See also ==
- Mainau Declaration
- Mutually assured destruction
