= Pugwash Conferences on Science and World Affairs =

International organization

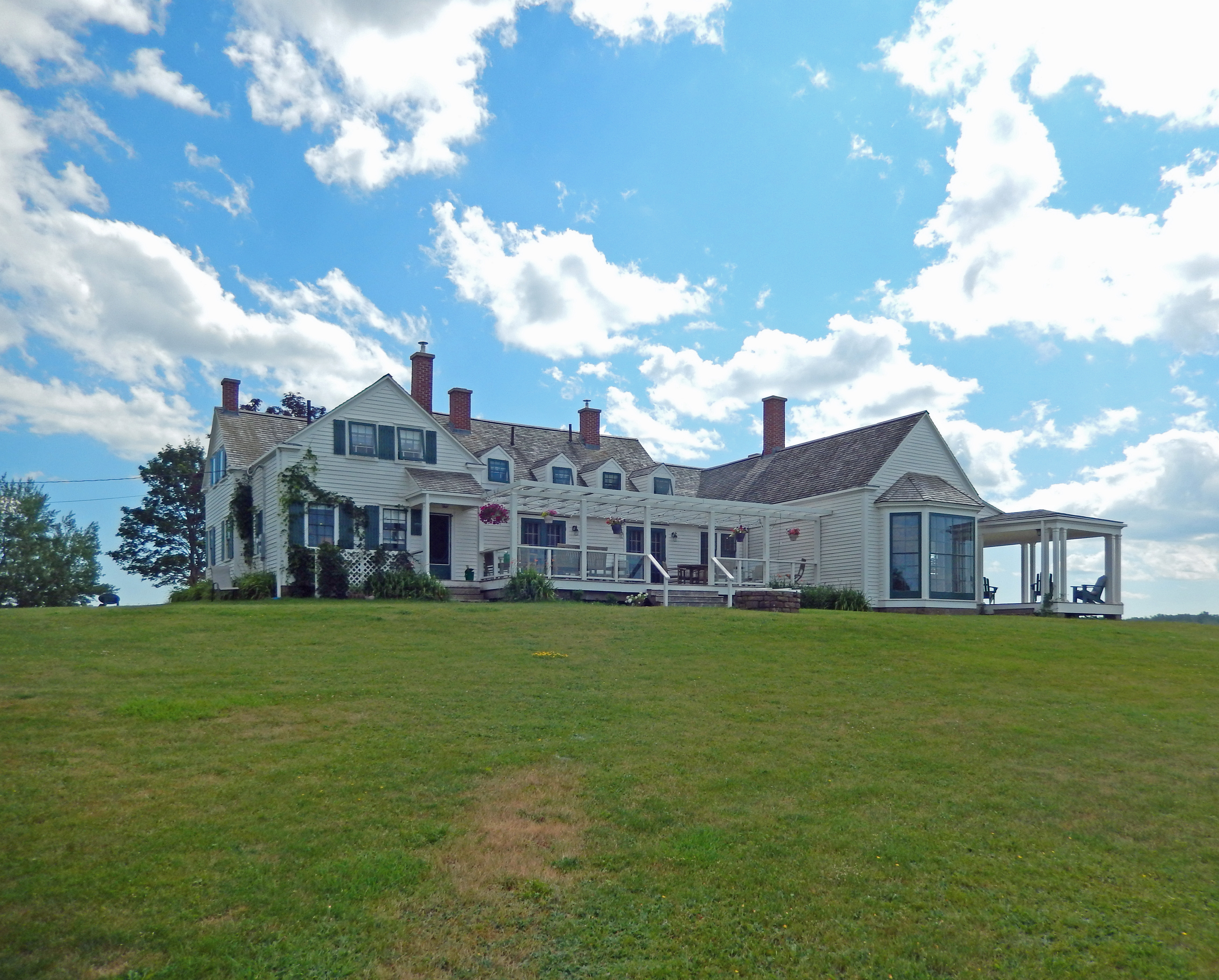
Thinkers' Lodge, Pugwash, Nova Scotia, Canada; site of the first Pugwash conference in 1957

The Pugwash Conferences on Science and World Affairs is an international organization that brings together scholars and public figures to work toward reducing the danger of armed conflict and to seek solutions to global security threats. It was founded in 1957 by Joseph Rotblat and Bertrand Russell in Pugwash, Nova Scotia, Canada, following the release of the Russell–Einstein Manifesto in 1955.

Rotblat and the Pugwash Conference jointly won the Nobel Peace Prize in 1995 for their efforts on nuclear disarmament. (Note: Russell's exclusion is explained because the Nobel Prizes are never awarded posthumously.) International Student/Young Pugwash groups have existed since founder Cyrus Eaton's death in 1979.

== Origin of the Pugwash Conferences ==
The Russell–Einstein Manifesto, released July 9, 1955, called for a conference for scientists to assess the dangers of weapons of mass destruction (then only considered to be nuclear weapons). Cyrus Eaton, an industrialist and philanthropist, offered on July 13 to finance and host the conference in the town of his birth, Pugwash, Nova Scotia. This was not taken up at the time because a meeting was planned for India, at the invitation of Prime Minister Jawaharlal Nehru. With the outbreak of the Suez Crisis the Indian conference was postponed. Aristotle Onassis offered to finance a meeting in Monaco instead, but this was rejected. Eaton's former invitation was taken up.

The first conference was held at what became known as Thinkers' Lodge in July 1957 in Pugwash, Nova Scotia. Twenty-two scientists attended the first conference:

- seven from the United States: David F. Cavers, Paul M. Doty, Hermann J. Muller, Eugene Rabinowitch, Walter Selove, Leó Szilárd, Victor Frederick Weisskopf
- three from the Soviet Union: Alexander M. Kuzin (Александр М. Кузин), Dmitri Skobeltsyn, Alexander V. Topchiev (Александр В. Топчиев)
- three from Japan: Iwao Ogawa, Shinichiro Tomonaga, Hideki Yukawa
- two from the UK: Cecil F. Powell, Joseph Rotblat
- two from Canada: Brock Chisholm, John S. Foster
- one each from Australia (Mark Oliphant), Austria (Hans Thirring), China (Zhou Peiyuan), France (Antoine M. B. Lacassagne), and Poland (Marian Danysz).

Cyrus Eaton, Eric Burhop, Ruth Adams, Anne Kinder Jones, and Vladimir Pavlichenko also were present. Many others were unable to attend, including co-founder Bertrand Russell, for health reasons. From the Soviet Union, Mikhail Ilyich Bruk (Russian: Михаил Ильич Брук; 1923 Moscow – 2009 Jurmala) attended as an English-Russian technical translator. Later, Armand Hammer stated, "Mike's KGB."

== Organizational structure ==
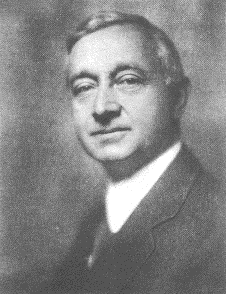
Cyrus Eaton – financier of Pugwash Conferences

The Pugwash Conferences on Science and World Affairs constitute an independent, international community of scientists, scholars, experts, and current and former policymakers from across regions and continents. United by a shared commitment to humanity’s survival and well-being, the Pugwash community seeks to reduce and eliminate those risks by advancing rational, evidence-based dialogue and cooperation.

Pugwash convenes scientists, scholars, and public policy specialists in their personal capacities for solution-oriented dialogue across political, geographical, and disciplinary divides. Participation is open to all who share Pugwash’s values, with no formal membership. Pugwash prioritizes impartiality and maintains independence from any political, religious or business interference. Pugwash values and principles are rooted in the Russell–Einstein Manifesto (1955) and its enduring warning that humanity must choose between ending war and ending civilisation.

Officers include the President, Secretary-General, and Treasurer, and formal governance is provided by the Pugwash Council, which serves for five years. Hussain al-Shahristani is the current President and Karen Hallberg is the current Secretary General.

The three Pugwash offices, in Geneva (international secretariat), London and Washington D.C., provide support for Pugwash activities and serve as liaisons to the United Nations and other international organizations. There are approximately fifty national Pugwash groups, organized as independent entities and often supported or administered by national academies of science.

The International Student/Young Pugwash groups work with, but are independent from, the international Pugwash group.

== Contributions to international security ==
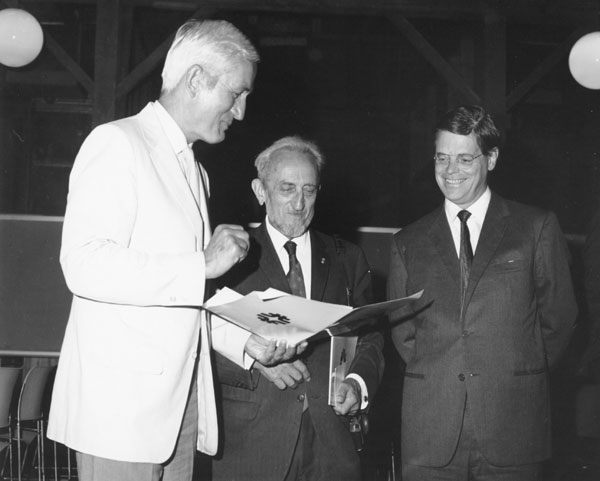
Pugwash encounter and tour held at the National Accelerator Laboratory, now Fermilab, September 12, 1970, left to right: Norman Ramsey, Francis Perrin, Robert R. Wilson

Pugwash's first fifteen years coincided with the Berlin Crisis, the Cuban Missile Crisis, the Warsaw Pact invasion of Czechoslovakia, and the Vietnam War. Pugwash played a useful role in opening communication channels during a time of otherwise-strained official and unofficial relations. In 1965, addressing a meeting at UNESCO House in Paris, Robert Oppenheimer gave his tribute to Albert Einstein for the Pugwash movement. Oppenheimer confidently asserted: "I know it to be true that it [averting the disaster of the arms race] had an essential part to play in the Treaty of Moscow, the limited test-ban treaty, which is a tentative, but to me very precious, declaration that reason might still prevail."

It provided background work to the Partial Test Ban Treaty (1963), the Non-Proliferation Treaty (1968), the Anti-Ballistic Missile Treaty (1972), the Biological Weapons Convention (1972), and the Chemical Weapons Convention (1993). Former US Secretary of Defense Robert McNamara has credited a backchannel Pugwash initiative (code named PENNSYLVANIA) with laying the groundwork for the negotiations that ended the Vietnam War. Mikhail Gorbachev admitted the influence of the organisation on him when he was leader of the Soviet Union. In addition, Pugwash has been credited with being a groundbreaking and innovative "transnational" organization and a leading example of the effectiveness of Track II diplomacy.

During the Cold War, it was claimed that the Pugwash Conference became a front conference for the Soviet Union, whose agents often managed to weaken Pugwash critique of USSR and instead concentrate on blaming the United States and the West. In 1980, the House Permanent Select Committee on Intelligence received a report that the Pugwash Conference was used by Soviet delegates to promote Soviet propaganda. Joseph Rotblat said in his 1998 Bertrand Russell Peace Lecture that there were a few participants in the conferences from the Soviet Union "who were obviously sent to push the party line, but the majority were genuine scientists and behaved as such".

Following the end of the Cold War, the traditional Pugwash focus on decreasing the salience of nuclear weapons and promoting a world free of nuclear weapons and other weapons of mass destruction addresses the following issue areas:

- Nuclear stability, nuclear disarmament and non-proliferation: 1. Traditional Nuclear Disarmament, US-Russia nuclear disarmament, nuclear weapons in Europe; 2. Nuclear weapons and nuclear proliferation in the Middle East, Israeli nuclear weapons, Iranian nuclear program, proposal for a Middle Eastern zone free of weapons of mass destruction, Arab attitudes towards nuclear weapons and nuclear proliferation; 3. India and Pakistan nuclear relations, the effects of US India nuclear deal; 4. North Korea.
- Regional security in regions where nuclear weapons exist or risks of nuclear proliferation are significant: 1. Middle East—general issues, the impact of the Palestinian problem and its relevance in the Arab world, the consequences of the so-called Arab spring and the growth of the Islamic movements and parties, Arab-Iranian, Arab-Israeli and Iran-Israeli relations; 2. South-Central Asia—traditional antagonism between India and Pakistan, the role of terrorist attacks in the worsening of such antagonism, US-Pakistani relations in general. The role of radical movements in Pakistan, reconciliation and peace in Afghanistan, talking to the Taliban (is it possible and how should be done?), Pakistani-Afghan relations.

The Pugwash movement has also been concerned with environmental issues and as a result of its 1988 meeting in Dagomys it issued the Dagomys Declaration on Environmental Degradation.

== Nobel Peace Prize ==
In 1995, fifty years after the bombing of Nagasaki and Hiroshima, and forty years after the signing of the Russell–Einstein Manifesto, the Pugwash Conferences and Joseph Rotblat were awarded the Nobel Peace Prize jointly "for their efforts to diminish the part played by nuclear arms in international politics and, in the longer run, to eliminate such arms." The Norwegian Nobel committee hoped that awarding the prize to Rotblat and Pugwash would "encourage world leaders to intensify their efforts to rid the world of nuclear weapons." In his acceptance speech, Rotblat quoted a key phrase from the Manifesto: "Remember your humanity."

== International Foundation for Science ==
From the 1965 Pugwash conference came a recommendation to establish the International Foundation for Science "in order to address the stultifying conditions under which younger faculty members in the universities of developing countries were attempting to do research". The organization gives grants to early-career scientists in low-income countries for work on local water resources and biology.

== Secretaries General ==
- (United Kingdom) Joseph Rotblat : 1957–1973
- (United States) Bernard Feld : 1973–1978
- (United States) Martin M. Kaplan : 1978–1989
- (Italy) Francesco Calogero : 1989–1997
- (United States) George Rathjens : 1997–2002
- (Italy) Paolo Cotta-Ramusino : 2002–2024
- (Argentina) Karen Hallberg : 2025–

== Pugwash Presidents ==
As of 2024, 14 individuals have served as Presidents of the Pugwash Conferences.

- Earl (Bertrand) Russell, 1950 Nobel Prize in Literature, a founder of the movement, was its natural head in its initial years. The formal office of the presidency was established at the Quinquennial Conference in Ronneby, in 1967. The president's role was to "preside over the Annual Pugwash Conferences and, in addition, between Conferences, to offer his counsel and advice to the members of the Continuing Committee and the Secretary-General, and thereby assist them in the execution of the activities of the Movement."
- Sir John Cockcroft, joint recipient of the 1951 Nobel Prize in Physics for pioneering work on the transmutation of atomic nuclei by artificially accelerated atomic particles, was elected as the first president in 1967, though he died suddenly ten days later.
- Lord Florey, who shared the 1945 Nobel Prize in Physiology or Medicine for extraction of penicillin, was then invited to become president, though he also died within weeks. At that point the Continuing Committee decided to have a rotating presidency for a term of one year, to have that office held by a distinguished person in the country where the annual conference would be held each year.
- Francis Perrin (1968), had worked with Frederic Joliot's team to establish in 1939 the possibility of nuclear chain reactions and nuclear energy production.
- Mikhail Millionshchikov (1969), an eminent physicist who later became Speaker of the Russian Parliament.
- Eugene Rabinowitch (1970), American biophysicist who worked on the Manhattan Project and was co-author with Leo Szilard of the Franck Report and co-founder in 1945 of the Bulletin of the Atomic Scientists. In September 1970, the Continuing Committee switched back to the initial idea of a permanent office of president, with a five-year term.
- Hannes Alfvén (1970–1975), recipient of the 1970 Nobel in Physics for work on his theory of magnetohydrodynamics.
- Dorothy Crowfoot Hodgkin (1976–1988), recipient of the 1964 Nobel Prize in Chemistry for her determinations by X-ray techniques of the structures of important biochemical substances.
- Sir Joseph Rotblat (1988–1997), physicist, one of the founders of the Pugwash Movement, co-recipient of the 1995 Nobel Peace Prize.
- Sir Michael Atiyah (1997–2002), a mathematician, was awarded the 1966 Fields Medal, for his work in developing K-theory.
- Prof. M.S. Swaminathan (2002–2007), agricultural scientist, one of the pioneers of the Green Revolution and recipient of the World Food Prize and the UNESCO Gandhi Prize.
- Amb. Jayantha Dhanapla (2007–2017), former Under-Secretary-General for Disarmament Affairs at the United Nations (1998–2003), and former Ambassador of Sri Lanka to the US (1995–1997) and to the UN Office in Geneva (1984–1987)
- Amb. Sergio Duarte (2017–2024), former UN Undersecretary for Disarmament Affairs and a retired career diplomat from Brazil
- Dr. Hussain al-Shahristani (2024- ), is an Iraqi scientist and politician, who was imprisoned after refusing to work on Saddam Hussein’s nuclear weapons program.

== Pugwashites ==
The Pugwash Conference itself does not have formal membership (although national organisations do). All participants take part in their individual capacities and not as representatives of any organization, institution or government. Anyone who has attended a meeting is considered a "Pugwashite". There are more than 3,500 "Pugwashites" worldwide.

=== Notable Pugwashites ===
- Syed Azeez Pasha
- Ruth Adams
- Raymond Aubrac
- Lev Artsimovich
- Frank Barnaby
- Ana Maria Cetto
- Carl Djerassi
- Paul M. Doty
- Bernard T. Feld
- Shalheveth Freier
- John Holdren
- George Ignatieff
- Frédéric Joliot-Curie
- Peter Kapitza
- Sergey Kapitsa
- Patricia Lindop
- Robert K. Logan
- Robert McNamara
- Georgi Nadjakov
- Wolfgang K. H. Panofsky
- Bas Pease
- John Charles Polanyi
- Isidor Isaac Rabi
- Martin Rees
- Sherry Rehman
- Andrei Sakharov
- M. Shamsher Ali
- Hussain al-Shahristani
- Ali Asghar Soltanieh
- Ivan Supek
- Igor Tamm
- Herbert York
- Victor Weisskopf
- Walter Dorn
- Max Rudolf "Rudi" Lemberg

== Legacy ==
As the birthplace of the Pugwash movement, the Thinkers' Lodge was designated a National Historic Site of Canada in 2008.

== See also ==
- List of anti-war organizations
- List of peace activists
- Student Pugwash USA
- International Student/Young Pugwash
- Nuclear Weapons: The Road to Zero
- Soviet influence on the peace movement
- International Campaign to Abolish Nuclear Weapons
- Anti-nuclear organizations
- List of books about nuclear issues
- List of films about nuclear issues
- Captain Pugwash
