= Joseph Rotblat =

Polish physicist (1908–2005)

Sir Joseph Rotblat KCMG CBE FRS
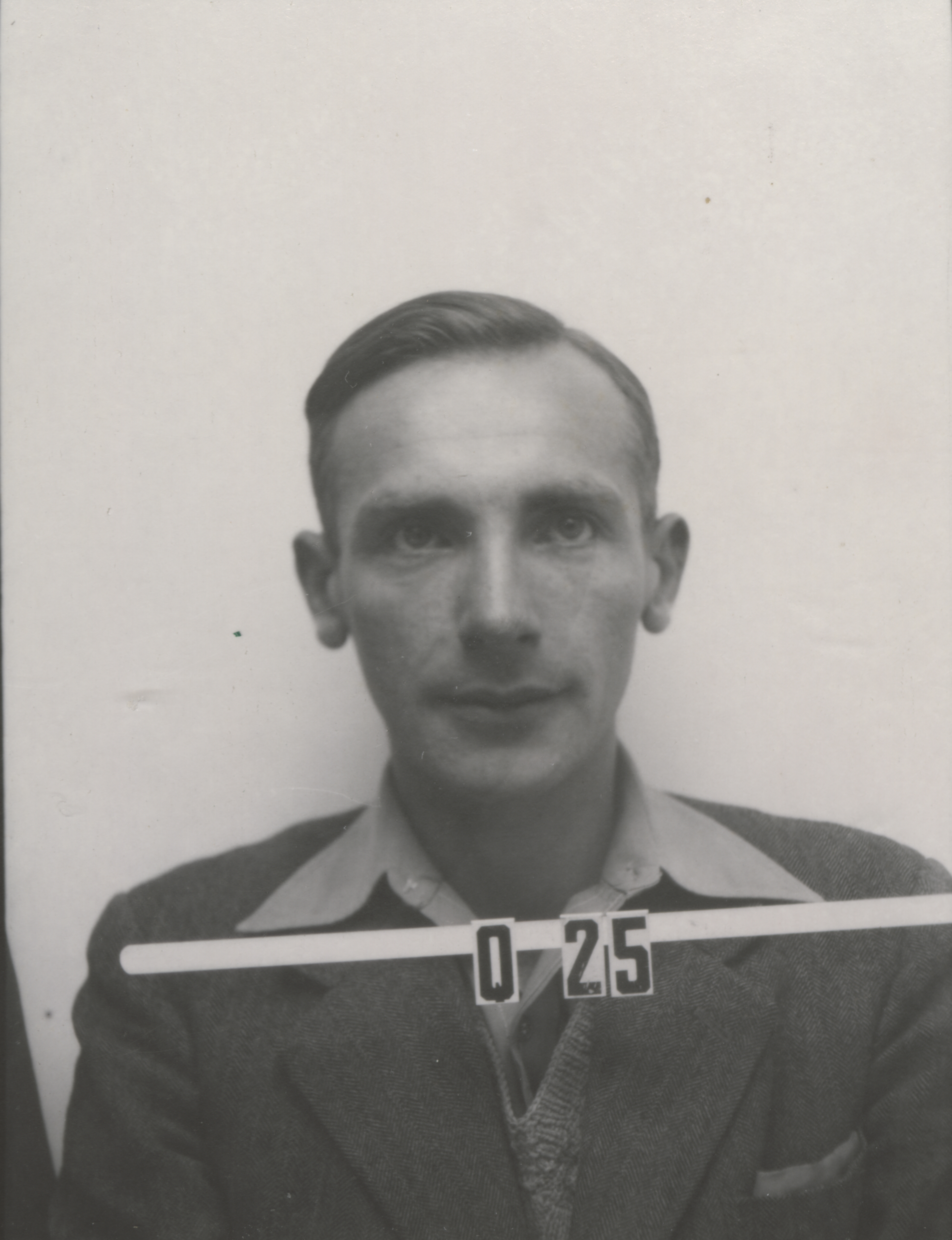
- Los Alamos badge photograph, 1944
- Born: Józef Rotblat; 4 November 1908; Warsaw, Congress Poland
- Died: 31 August 2005 (aged 96); London, United Kingdom
- Resting place: Hampstead Cemetery, London
- Education: Free University of Poland; University of Warsaw; University of Liverpool; University of London
- Known for: Campaigning for nuclear disarmament; Manhattan Project; Hippocratic Oath for scientists
- Spouse: Tola Gryn
- Awards: Knight Commander of the Order of St Michael and St George (1998); Nobel Peace Prize (1995); Fellow of the Royal Society (1995); Albert Einstein Peace Prize (1992); Commander of the Order of the British Empire (1965)
- Scientific career
- Fields: Physics
- Workplaces: Scientific Society of Warsaw; Free University of Poland; University of Warsaw; University of Liverpool; Los Alamos National Laboratory; St Bartholomew's Hospital; University of London; University of Edinburgh
- Thesis: Determination of a number of neutrons emitted from a source (1950)
- Doctoral advisor: James Chadwick
- Rotblat's voice from the BBC Radio 4 programme Great Lives broadcast 13 January 2012

Sir Joseph Rotblat KCMG CBE FRS (Polish: Józef Rotblat; 4 November 1908 – 31 August 2005) was a Polish and British physicist. During World War II he worked on Tube Alloys and the Manhattan Project, but left the Los Alamos Laboratory on grounds of conscience after it became clear to him in 1944 that Germany had ceased development of an atomic bomb.

His work on nuclear fallout was a major contribution toward the ratification of the 1963 Partial Nuclear Test Ban Treaty. A signatory of the 1955 Russell–Einstein Manifesto, he was secretary-general of the Pugwash Conferences on Science and World Affairs from their founding until 1973 and shared, with the Pugwash Conferences, the 1995 Nobel Peace Prize "for efforts to diminish the part played by nuclear arms in international affairs and, in the longer run, to eliminate such arms."

== Early life ==
Józef Rotblat was born on 4 November 1908 to a Polish-Jewish family in Warsaw, then part of the Russian-ruled Kingdom of Poland, better known as Congress Poland. He was one of seven children, two of whom died in infancy. His father, Zygmunt Rotblat, built up and ran a nationwide horse-drawn carriage business, owned land and bred horses. Józef's early years were spent in what was a prosperous household but circumstances changed at the outbreak of World War I. Borders were closed and the family's horses were requisitioned, leading to the failure of the business and poverty for their family. Despite having a religious background, by the age of ten, he doubted the existence of God, and later became an agnostic.

Rotblat's parents could not afford to send him to a gymnasium, so Rotblat received his secondary education in a cheder taught by a local rabbi. He then attended a technical school, where he studied electrical engineering, graduating with his diploma in 1923 in the newly established Republic of Poland. After graduating, Rotblat worked as an electrician in Warsaw, but had an ambition to become a physicist. He sat the entrance examinations of the Free University of Poland in January 1929, and passed the physics one with ease, but was less successful in writing a paper about the Commission of National Education, a subject about which he knew nothing. He was then interviewed by Ludwik Wertenstein, the Dean of the Science Faculty. Wertenstein had studied in Paris under Marie Curie and at the Cavendish Laboratory at the University of Cambridge under Ernest Rutherford. Wertenstein offered Rotblat a place.

Rotblat earned a Master of Arts at the Free University in 1932. After, he entered the University of Warsaw, and became a Doctor of Physics in 1938. He held the position of Research Fellow in the Radiological Laboratory of the Scientific Society of Warsaw, of which Wertenstein was the director, and became assistant Director of the Atomic Physics Institute of the Free University of Poland in 1938.

== Marriage and early physics work ==
During this period, Rotblat married a literature student, Tola Gryn, whom he had met at a student summer camp in 1930.

Before the outbreak of World War II, he conducted experiments that showed that in the fission process, neutrons were emitted. In early 1939, he envisaged that a large number of fissions could occur and if this happened within a sufficiently short time, then considerable amounts of energy could be released. He went on to calculate that this process could occur in less than a microsecond, and as a consequence would result in an explosion.

In 1939, through Wertenstein's connections, Rotblat was invited to study in Paris and at the University of Liverpool under James Chadwick, winner of the 1932 Nobel Prize for discovering the neutron. Chadwick was building a particle accelerator called a "cyclotron" to study fundamental nuclear reactions, and Rotblat wanted to build a similar machine in Warsaw, so he decided to join Chadwick in Liverpool. He travelled to England alone because he could not afford to support his wife there.

Before long, Chadwick gave Rotblat a fellowship (the Oliver Lodge Fellowship), doubling his income, and in that summer of 1939, the young Pole returned home, intending to bring Tola back with him. When the time came to leave Warsaw in late August, however, she was ill following an operation for appendicitis, and remained behind, expecting to follow within days; however, the outbreak of war brought calamity. Tola was trapped, and desperate efforts in the ensuing months to bring her out through Denmark (with the help of Niels Bohr), Belgium, and finally Italy came to nothing, as each country in turn was closed off by the war. He never saw her again; she was murdered in the Holocaust at the Belzec concentration camp. This affected him deeply for the rest of his life, and he never remarried.

== Manhattan Project ==
While still in Poland, Rotblat had realised that nuclear fission might possibly be used to produce an atomic bomb. He first thought that he should "put the whole thing out of my mind", but he continued because he thought the only way to prevent Nazi Germany from using a nuclear bomb was if Britain had one to act as a deterrent. He worked with Chadwick on Tube Alloys, the British atomic bomb project.

In February 1944, Rotblat joined the Los Alamos Laboratory as part of Chadwick's British Mission to the Manhattan Project. Although he was upset by the morality of the project, he believed the allies needed to be able to threaten retaliation in case Germany developed the bomb. The usual condition for people to work on the Manhattan Project was that they had to become US citizens or British subjects. Rotblat declined, and the condition was waived. At Los Alamos, he was befriended by Stan Ulam, a fellow Polish-Jewish scientist, with whom he was able to converse in Polish. Rotblat worked in Egon Bretscher's group, investigating whether high-energy gamma rays produced by nuclear fission would interfere with the nuclear chain reaction process, and then with Robert R. Wilson's cyclotron group.

Rotblat continued to have strong reservations about the use of science to develop such a devastating weapon. In 1985, he related that, at a private dinner at the Chadwicks' house at Los Alamos in March 1944, he was shocked to hear the director of the Manhattan Project, Major General Leslie R. Groves, Jr., say words to the effect that the real purpose in making the bomb was to subdue the Soviets. Indeed, Groves testified under oath at the 1954 hearing about J. Robert Oppenheimer's security record that "there was never, from about two weeks from the time I took charge of this project, any illusion on my part but that Russia was our enemy and that the project was conducted on that basis." Despite Groves' testimony, in response to a suggestion by Andrew Brown that Groves' remark may have been made to test Rotblat's loyalty, Barton Bernstein, who had questioned the accuracy of Rotblat's memory, commented in a letter to Brown: "It's an interesting, responsible interpretation, and cannot be dismissed, though I'm not prepared to embrace it."

By the end of 1944, it was also apparent that Germany had abandoned the development of its own bomb in 1942. Rotblat then asked to leave the project on grounds of conscience and returned to Liverpool.

Chadwick learned that the chief of security held a security dossier in which Rotblat was accused of intending to return to England so that he could be flown over Poland and parachute into Soviet territory to pass on the secrets of the atomic bomb. He was also accused of visiting someone in Santa Fe and leaving them a blank cheque to finance the formation of a communist cell.

Rotblat was able to show that much of the information within the dossier had been fabricated. In addition, FBI records show that in 1950, Rotblat's friend in Santa Fe was tracked down in California, and she flatly denied the story; the cheque had never been cashed and had been left to pay for items not available in the UK during the war. In 1985, Rotblat recounted how a box containing "all my documents" went missing on a train ride from Washington D.C. to New York as he was leaving the country, but the presence of large numbers of Rotblat's personal papers from Los Alamos now archived at the Churchill Archives Centre "is totally at odds with Rotblat's account of events".

== Nuclear fallout ==
Rotblat returned to Britain to become senior lecturer and acting director of research in nuclear physics at the University of Liverpool. He was naturalised as a British subject on 8 January 1946. Most of his family had survived the war. With the help of a Polish man, his brother-in-law Mieczysław (Mietek) Pokorny had created false Polish Catholic identities for Rotblat's sister Ewa and niece Halina. Ewa, taking advantage of the fact that she was an ash blonde who, like Rotblat, spoke fluent Polish as well as Yiddish, smuggled the rest of the family out of the Warsaw Ghetto. Mietek, Rotblat's brother Mordecai (Michael) and Michael's wife Manya, Rotblat's mother Scheindel, and two Russian soldiers lived in a concealed bunker underneath a house near Otwock, in which Ewa and Halina lived with a Polish family. Displays of Polish anti-Semitism that she witnessed during the Warsaw Ghetto Uprising embittered Ewa towards Poland, and she petitioned Rotblat to help the family emigrate to England. He therefore now accepted Chadwick's offer of British citizenship so he could help them escape from Poland. They lived with him in London for some time before becoming established. Halina would go on to graduate from Somerville College, Oxford, and University College London, and become an editor of the Dictionary of National Biography.

Rotblat felt betrayed by the use of atomic weapons against Japan, and gave a series of public lectures in which he called for a three-year moratorium on all atomic research. Rotblat was determined that his research should have only peaceful ends, and so became interested in the medical and biological uses of radiation. In 1949, he became Professor of Physics at St Bartholomew's Hospital ("Barts"), London, a teaching hospital associated with the University of London. He remained there for the rest of his career, becoming a professor emeritus in 1976. He received his PhD from Liverpool in 1950, having written his thesis on the "Determination of a number of neutrons emitted from a source". He also worked on several official bodies connected with nuclear physics, and arranged the Atom Train, a major travelling exhibition for schools on civil nuclear energy.

At St Bartholomew's, Rotblat worked on the effects of radiation on living organisms, especially on ageing and fertility. This led him to an interest in nuclear fallout, especially strontium-90 and the safe limits of ionising radiation. In 1955, he demonstrated that the contamination caused by the fallout after the Castle Bravo nuclear test at Bikini Atoll by the United States had been far greater than that stated officially. Until then the official line had been that the growth in the strength of atomic bombs was not accompanied by an equivalent growth in radioactivity released. Japanese scientists who had collected data from a fishing vessel, the Lucky Dragon, which had inadvertently been exposed to fallout, disagreed with this. Rotblat was able to deduce that the bomb had three stages and showed that the fission phase at the end of the explosion increased the amount of radioactivity by forty times. His paper was taken up by the media and contributed to the public debate that resulted in the ending of atmospheric tests by the Partial Nuclear Test Ban Treaty.

== Peace work ==
Rotblat believed that scientists should always be concerned with the ethical consequences of their work. He became one of the most prominent critics of the nuclear arms race, was the youngest signatory of the Russell–Einstein Manifesto in 1955, and chaired the press conference that launched it. After the positive coverage of the manifesto, Cyrus Eaton offered to fund the influential Pugwash Conferences on Science and World Affairs, an international organisation that brought together scholars and public figures to work toward reducing the danger of armed conflict and to seek solutions to global security threats, particularly those related to nuclear warfare. With Bertrand Russell and others, Rotblat organised the first of these in 1957 and continued to work within their framework until his death. In 1958, Rotblat joined the executive committee of the newly launched Campaign for Nuclear Disarmament (CND). Despite the Iron Curtain and the Cold War, he advocated establishing links between scientists from the West and East. For this reason, the Pugwash conferences were viewed with suspicion. Initially the British government thought them little more than "Communist front gatherings".

However, he persuaded John Cockcroft, a member of the United Kingdom Atomic Energy Authority, to suggest who might be invited to the 1958 conference. He successfully resisted a subsequent attempt to take over the conferences, causing a Foreign Office official to write that "the difficulty is to get Prof. Rotblat to pay any attention to what we think ... He is no doubt jealous of his independence and scientific integrity", and that securing "a new organizer for the British delegation seems to be the first need, but I do not know if there is any hope of this." By the early 1960s the Ministry of Defence thought that the Pugwash Conferences were "now a very respectable organization", and the Foreign Office stated that it had "official blessing" and that any breakthrough may well originate at such gatherings. The Pugwash Conferences are credited with laying the ground work for the Partial Test Ban Treaty of 1963, the Nonproliferation Treaty of 1968, the Anti-Ballistic Missile Treaty of 1972, the Biological Weapons Convention of 1972 and the Chemical Weapons Convention of 1993. In parallel with the Pugwash Conferences, he joined with Albert Einstein, Robert Oppenheimer, Bertrand Russell and other concerned scientists to found the World Academy of Art and Science, which was proposed by them in the mid-1950s and formally constituted in 1960.

He was one of the signatories of the agreement to convene a convention for drafting a world constitution. As a result, for the first time in human history, a World Constituent Assembly convened to draft and adopt a Constitution for the Federation of Earth.

== Later life ==
Rotblat retired from St Bartholomew's in 1976. In 1975 and 1976, he was Montague Visiting Professor of International Relations at the University of Edinburgh. He believed that scientists have an individual moral responsibility and, just as the Hippocratic Oath provides a code of conduct for physicians, he thought that scientists should have their own code of moral conduct, a Hippocratic Oath for scientists. During his tenure as president of the Pugwash conferences, Rotblat nominated Israeli nuclear technician Mordechai Vanunu for the Nobel Peace Prize every year from 1988 to 2004. Vanunu had disclosed the extent of Israel's nuclear weapons programme and consequently spent 18 years in prison, including more than 11 years in solitary confinement.

Rotblat campaigned ceaselessly against nuclear weapons. In an interview shortly before the 2004 US presidential election, he expressed his belief that the Russell–Einstein Manifesto still had "great relevance today, after 50 years, particularly in connection with the election of a president in the United States", and above all, with respect to the potential pre-emptive use of nuclear weapons. Central to his view of the world were the words of the Russell–Einstein Manifesto with which he concluded his acceptance lecture for the Nobel Prize in 1995: "Above all, remember your humanity". He also served as editor-in-chief of the journal Physics in Medicine and Biology from 1960 to 1972. He was the president of several institutions and professional associations and also a co-founder and member of the governing board of the Stockholm International Peace Research Institute, as well as a member of the Advisory Committee on Medical Research of the World Health Organization. Rotblat was a programme advisor to the BAFTA award-winning nuclear docudrama Threads, produced in 1984.

Rotblat suffered a stroke in 2004, and his health declined. He died of septicaemia at the Royal Free Hospital in Camden, London, on 31 August 2005.

== Awards and honours ==
Rotblat was appointed a Commander of the Order of the British Empire in the 1965 New Year Honours. He won the Albert Einstein Peace Prize in 1992, and was elected a Fellow of the Royal Society (FRS) in 1995. He was appointed a Knight Commander of the Order of St Michael and St George in the 1998 Birthday Honours for services to international understanding. His certificate of election to the Royal Society read

He made important contributions to nuclear physics, both before and after working during the war on atomic energy problems at Liverpool and at Los Alamos. This included observations on the angular distribution of protons from the (d,p) reaction, which led to an important tool for determining the spin and parity of nuclear levels. He worked on the medical applications of nuclear physics, and later on the biological effects of radiation. His outstanding distinction is in his work for the Pugwash Conference on Science and World Affairs. He was one of the founders of these conferences, and for the past 37 years has been untiring in his support and enthusiasms [sic] for the conferences, which have enabled scientists from all over the world and with opposing ideologies to talk objectively about the issues dividing them. His untiring devotion to this cause and his inspiration have been vital for the development and continuing existence of the conferences.

Rotblat shared, with the Pugwash Conferences, the 1995 Nobel Peace Prize for efforts toward nuclear disarmament. His citation read: "for efforts to diminish the part played by nuclear arms in international affairs and, in the longer run, to eliminate such arms." Towards the end of his life, he was also elected honorary member of the International Association of Physics Students, and the Jamnalal Bajaj Foundation of India awarded him the Jamnalal Bajaj Award in 1999. He was an honorary editorial board member for ‘Journal of Environment Peace’ published from the library of University of Toronto, now from Noble International University, edited by Professor Bob Ganguly and Professor Roger Hansell.

A plaque commemorating Joseph Rotblat, unveiled in 2017 in the presence of Polish Ambassador Arkady Rzegocki, can be found outside the offices of British Pugwash, on the corner of Bury Place and Great Russell Street in London.

== See also ==
- List of Poles
- List of Polish Nobel laureates
- List of Jewish Nobel laureates
