= Nuclear famine =

Possible famine caused by nuclear war

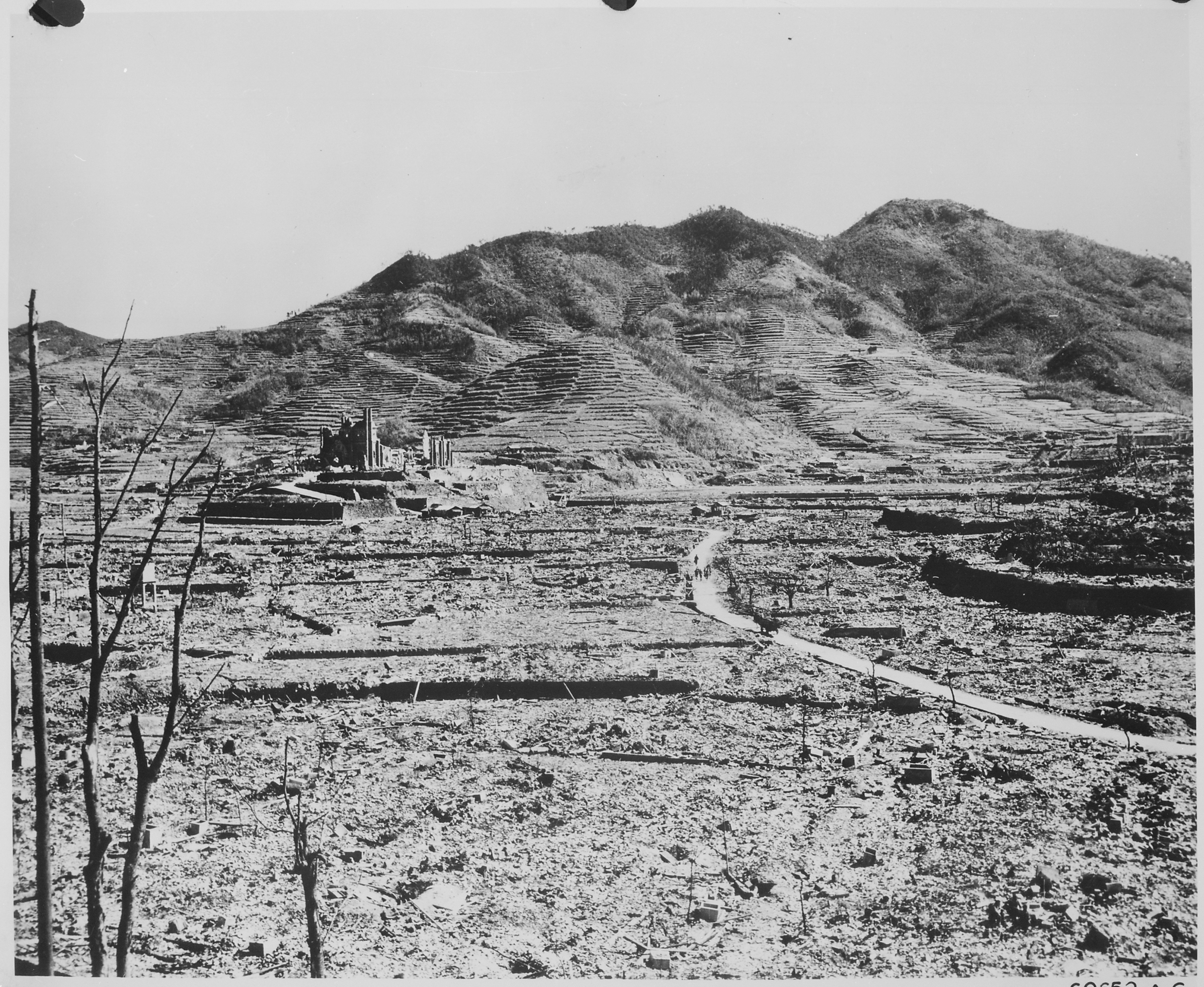
Destruction after the atomic bombing of Nagasaki in 1945. The widespread destruction and radiation resulting from a nuclear exchange may seriously disrupt global or regional agricultural production.

Nuclear famine is a hypothesized famine considered a potential threat following global or regional nuclear exchange. It is thought that even subtle cooling effects resulting from a regional nuclear exchange could have a substantial impact on agriculture production, triggering a food crisis amongst the world's survivors.

While belief in the "nuclear winter" hypothesis is both popular and heavily debated, the issue of potential food supply disruption from blast and fallout effects following a nuclear war is less controversial. Several books have been written on the food supply issue, including Fallout Protection, Nuclear War Survival Skills, Would the Insects Inherit the Earth and Other Subjects of Concern to Those Who Worry About Nuclear War, and most recently the extreme nuclear winter and comet impact countermeasuring Feeding Everyone No Matter What.

Together with these largely introductory texts, more official tomes with a focus on organization, agriculture, and radioecology include Nutrition in the Postattack Environment by the RAND Corporation, the continuity of government plans for preventing a famine in On Reorganizing After Nuclear Attack, and Survival of the Relocated Population of the U.S. After a Nuclear Attack by Nobel Prize winner Eugene Wigner, while those focused solely on radioecology and agriculture include Effects of Fallout Radiation on Crop Production, Behavior of Radioactive Fallout in Soils and Plants, and practical countermeasures that were intended to be taken on the individual level in Defense Against Radioactive Fallout on the Farm.

== Early work ==
One of the first works to discuss the problem of fallout, farming, food and supply was Herman Kahn's 1960 publication On Thermonuclear War. Kahn argued that while total war would indeed be an "unprecedented catastrophe", food which is slightly-to-moderately contaminated need not be wasted as the ingestion of such food by the elderly would not result in any observable increase in cancer in this cohort. This is due to the fact that, like other common carcinogens such as cigarette smoke, cancers do not immediately emerge after exposure to radiation or specifically from nuclear fallout; instead cancer has a minimum latency period of some 5+ years, which is supported by the research of Project 4.1. It is for this reason that the elderly could eat slight-to-moderately contaminated food without much, if any, ill effect, allowing for the most uncontaminated food to be saved for younger generations.

== Overview ==
From 1983-1985, in a time period during which the "nuclear winter" hypothesis was notably still in its early "apocalyptic" 1-D computer model phase, more than 300 physical, atmospheric, agricultural and ecological scientists from over 30 countries around the world came together to participate in the Scientific Committee on Problems of the Environment-Environmental Effects of Nuclear War (SCOPE-ENUWAR) project. This project assessed the global consequences of nuclear war, resulting in a two-volume publication titled Environmental Consequences of Nuclear War, detailing the physical, atmospheric, ecological and agricultural effects of a major nuclear war. In the publication, it is predicted that billions of survivors in the aftermath of nuclear war, even in non-combatant countries, may experience a dwindling food supply (if the continuity of government countermeasures were not fielded) which plunges survivors into "massive levels of malnutrition and starvation," and in dire situations, "only a small fraction of the current world population could expect to survive a few years".

Many processes can be involved leading up to a massive food shortage on a global scale. To begin, crops, stored food and agricultural supplies such as fertilizers and pesticides can be instantly destroyed in nuclear blasts; nuclear contamination of soil, air and water can render food unsafe to eat, and crops unable to grow properly; and uncontrollable fires can impede normal agricultural or food gathering activities. Experts predicted that in the first few years that follow a nuclear war, more complex processes, such as the crippling of the international economy and trade systems, collapse of global food transportation and distribution networks, loss of exportation incentives and importation, drastic climatic stress on the agroecosystems, and associated chaos and disruption in society can spawn to escalate the problem of food shortage.

Following the publication of Environmental Consequences of Nuclear War, more studies have emerged based on modeling and analysis of hypothetical nuclear exchanges between nuclear-armed nations. The conclusions of these studies illustrate that a nuclear war is a self-destructive road to mass starvation, and echoed the statement made in The Medical Implications of Nuclear War, a publication by the National Academy of Sciences, that "the primary mechanism for human fatalities would likely not be from blast effects, not from thermal radiation burns, and not from ionizing radiation, but, rather, from mass starvation".

While the total number of global nuclear weapons had declined by two thirds following the U.S.-Soviet Strategic Arms Reduction Treaty (START) compared to the early 80s, some experts feel that the risk of nuclear conflict has not decreased, but has instead risen. This is due to nuclear proliferation as more countries such as India, Pakistan, and North Korea now have nuclear arsenals, increasing the risk of regional nuclear conflicts. Growing military tensions, accidents, sabotages and cyber-attacks are all potential trigger points of massive nuclear disruption and regional, if not global famine.

== Effects of nuclear winter on agroecosystems ==
Based on the faulty studies performed early in the 1980s, it was predicted that an American-Soviet nuclear war would project so much light-blocking smoke into the atmosphere that months to years of "nuclear winter" could take place and bring any agricultural activity in the Northern Hemisphere to an acute halt. This was on top of exaggerated concerns about the development of worldwide toxic photochemical ozone smog from high energy nuclear blasts, which was projected to bring about environmental conditions so disruptive for terrestrial plants and marine planktons to propagate, such that crop and marine harvests will be detrimentally affected.

Biologists have long analyzed that a number of factors arising from "nuclear winter" will induce a significant impact on agriculture. For instance, nuclear war in growing seasons can bring about sudden episodes of low temperature (-10 degree Celsius or more) for days to weeks, and drawing reference from the "year without a summer" in 1816, episodes of freezing events are capable of destroying a large quantity of crops. In addition, growing season would potentially be shortened, as reported by Robock et al., who calculated that a regional nuclear war between India and Pakistan will substantially reduce freeze-free growing season in the Northern and Southern Hemispheres for several years and devastate agricultural produce as crops do not have sufficient time to reach maturity.

In contrast, the natural marine ecosystems, a major supplier of food to human societies, are less vulnerable to sudden temperature fall. However, they are highly sensitive to reduced incident sunlight and increased level of UV-B radiation. In the event of a large-scale nuclear war, a mere 25% reduction in ozone is predicted to cause an enhanced UV-B radiation that reduce net photosynthesis in the surface euphotic zone by 35%, and in the whole euphotic zone by 10% (euphotic zone refers to depths in the ocean with light levels sufficient for active photosynthesis). With a corresponding reduction in light available for photosynthesis, phytoplankton populations were in the 1985 book expected to plummet, and scientists had even speculated that most of the phytoplankton and herbivorous zooplanktons (that feed on phytoplanktons) in more than half of the Northern Hemisphere oceans would die. More modern appraisals of potential ozone layer issues arising from nuclear fireballs have determined these earlier assumptions to have been completely unfounded. According to The World Bank, the ocean supplies the world's population with 16% of their animal protein intake; given that the marine food chains are built upon the photosynthesis of phytoplanktons, large-scale nuclear wars, in these 1980s models and books, was regarded as inadvertently devastating fisheries and to affect millions, if not billions of people who rely on the ocean for food.

== Effects of nuclear war on food distribution ==
In addition to the adverse effects on the agroecosystems, socio-economical factors of war and nuclear destructions also possess far-reaching implications on food availability. It was observed in the aftermath of atomic bombings in Hiroshima and Nagasaki that food was even more scarce as crops in nearby regions were destroyed and distribution of food from other parts of Japan was cut off as a result of the destruction of railroads, when crop production was already low in previous years due to war and poor weather.

Today, 85% of the nations in the world have low to marginal amount of homegrown food to sustain themselves and are increasingly reliant on well-connected food trade networks for imported food. A 2014 study examined the consequences of continental-scale disruptions on wheat and rice trade networks that can occur when global food supply is substantially reduced, such as following a large-scale nuclear war. Considering the tendency for exporting countries to withhold their crops in times of food shortage, the prediction model in this study determined that the amount of wheat and rice exports are reduced combined with losses in export networks. Critically, the authors found that the least developed countries will suffer greater import losses due to financial constraints, and the loss of trade networks will eventually lead to a larger population vulnerable to food shortages.

== Global famine due to regional nuclear conflict ==
Much of the research to date on potential nuclear war-induced climate change focuses on a hypothetical, large-scale nuclear exchange between modern day Russia and the United States. However, the post-Cold War world also includes a number of other nuclear-armed countries — such as India, Pakistan, and North Korea — that are currently engaged in de facto or frozen armed conflicts with their neighbors. In comparison to "global" nuclear war, a regional conflict between nations with relatively small nuclear arsenals would likely produce less dramatic climate effects. Nonetheless, it has been argued that global cooling resulting from such a conflict could have large-scale impacts on agriculture and food supply systems worldwide.

Several studies led by Alan Robock of Rutgers University describe this possibility. A 2007 analysis using contemporary climate models found that a hypothetical nuclear exchange between India and Pakistan involving 100 Hiroshima-size bombs (less than 0.1% of the explosive yield of the current global nuclear arsenal) would be sufficient to cause drastic global cooling. The model not only predicted effects consistent with the traditional "nuclear winter" concept, but also suggested that climate effects would last longer than previously expected. These effects could include marked changes in normal seasonal patterns, a 10% average decline in rainfall around the world, and "a cooling of several degrees ... over large areas of North America and Eurasia, including most of the grain-growing regions".

A related 2012 study assimilated a dynamic agrosystem model to predict the agricultural effects of an India-Pakistan war. The model in this case showed that a regional nuclear war on a separate continent could lead to a significant drop in yield for both corn and soybean production in the American Midwest, with the greatest crop losses occurring five years following the event. Over the ten years following the event, corn production was predicted to decline by an average of 10% and soybean by an average of 6–12%, depending on location. Year-to-year variability was expected to be high, and could be affected by anomalies in temperature, rainfall, and sunlight.

Other studies based on a Robock et al. style India-Pakistan war utilize a different agricultural model to predict effects on rice production in China. After taking into consideration the weather conditions and farming practices specific to different provinces, rice production was predicted to decline by an average of 21% for the first four years and by approximately 10% the following six years. While potential adaptive measures (such as increasing rice plantations in less affected provinces or fertilizer adjustments) could be implemented, these strategies come with their own limitations and consequences—including further environmental pollution. Chinese production of maize and wheat could also be affected. In particular, wheat production in the wake of such an incident could drop by more than 50% in the first year and decline by an average of 39% in the first 5 years.

A new study developed to evaluate the impact of a famine due to a nuclear winter for the Nature Food Journal. They hypothesized severe effects on global food security and voiced concerns about various countries that already have issues with acquiring various supplies outside of food. This study was concerned about the possibility of a dust cloud caused by a nuclear exchange that would act like ones that have occurred on mars would cause issues for Earth. Their study had found that 5 Tg of soot and ash would be enough to cause a famine. The severe mass food shortage would be one that livestock and aquatic food production would not be able to compensate for. The extent of climate disruption of various methods of food production would take a heavy amount of lives on Earth. The study estimated 5 billion lives to be lost with the occurrence of a nuclear famine. For comparison, the Earth's population had just reached 8 billion on November 15, 2022. A nuclear famine would prove to be an apocalypse that many believe should be a concern when considering political and nuclear intrigue.

=== Vulnerable populations ===
The International Physicians for the Prevention of Nuclear War (IPPNW) reported in 2013 that more than two billion people would be at risk of starvation in the event of a limited nuclear exchange, such as one that could occur between India and Pakistan, or by the use of even a small number of the nuclear weapons held by the US and Russia.

This report argued that the world is in a state in which it is particularly vulnerable to even modest declines in food production. In turn, small changes in average global temperature can have disproportionately large effects on crops. Agricultural studies predicting substantial declines in U.S. and Chinese crop production may be conservative, as they do not take into account ozone depletion or daily temperature extremes. They cite the example of the Mount Tambora volcanic eruption in 1815, which produced an average annual temperature deviation of only −0.7 °C, but which brought mid-summer killing frosts to the mid-Atlantic states and caused up to 75% crop losses in northern Europe.

In addition, the report authors argue that small perturbations in the food supply are highly amplified for malnourished populations. In particular, about 800 million people are chronically malnourished, and even a 10% decline in their food consumption would put them at risk. World reserves of grain stocks could serve as a buffer to this; however, rough estimates suggest that current reserves would only last approximately 68–77 days.

Famines are also often associated with epidemics. Following the Mount Tambora eruption, an 1816 famine in Ireland triggered a typhus epidemic in Ireland that spread to much of Europe, and the Bengal famine of 1943 was associated with major localized epidemics of cholera, malaria, smallpox, and dysentery. Similarly, the vast and crowded megacities of the developing world could see major outbreaks of infectious disease as a secondary result of famine.

However, as reported in a paper published in the journal Public Health Reports, it is one of a number of prevalent myths that infectious diseases always occur after a disaster in cities.

Epidemics seldom occur after a disaster, and dead bodies do not lead to catastrophic outbreaks of infectious diseases. Intuitively, epidemic diseases, illnesses, and injuries might be expected following major disasters. However, as noted by de Goyet, epidemics seldom occur after disasters, and unless deaths are caused by one of a small number of infectious diseases such as smallpox, typhus, or plague, exposure to dead bodies does not cause disease ... Cholera and typhoid seldom pose a major health threat after disasters unless they are already endemic.

== See also ==
- Bellesrad
- Marshall Islands
- Cold War II
- Democide
- Global catastrophic risk
- Nuclear holocaust
- Nuclear terrorism
- World War III
