= Impact winter =

Hypothesized climate effects due to an asteroid or comet impact on Earth

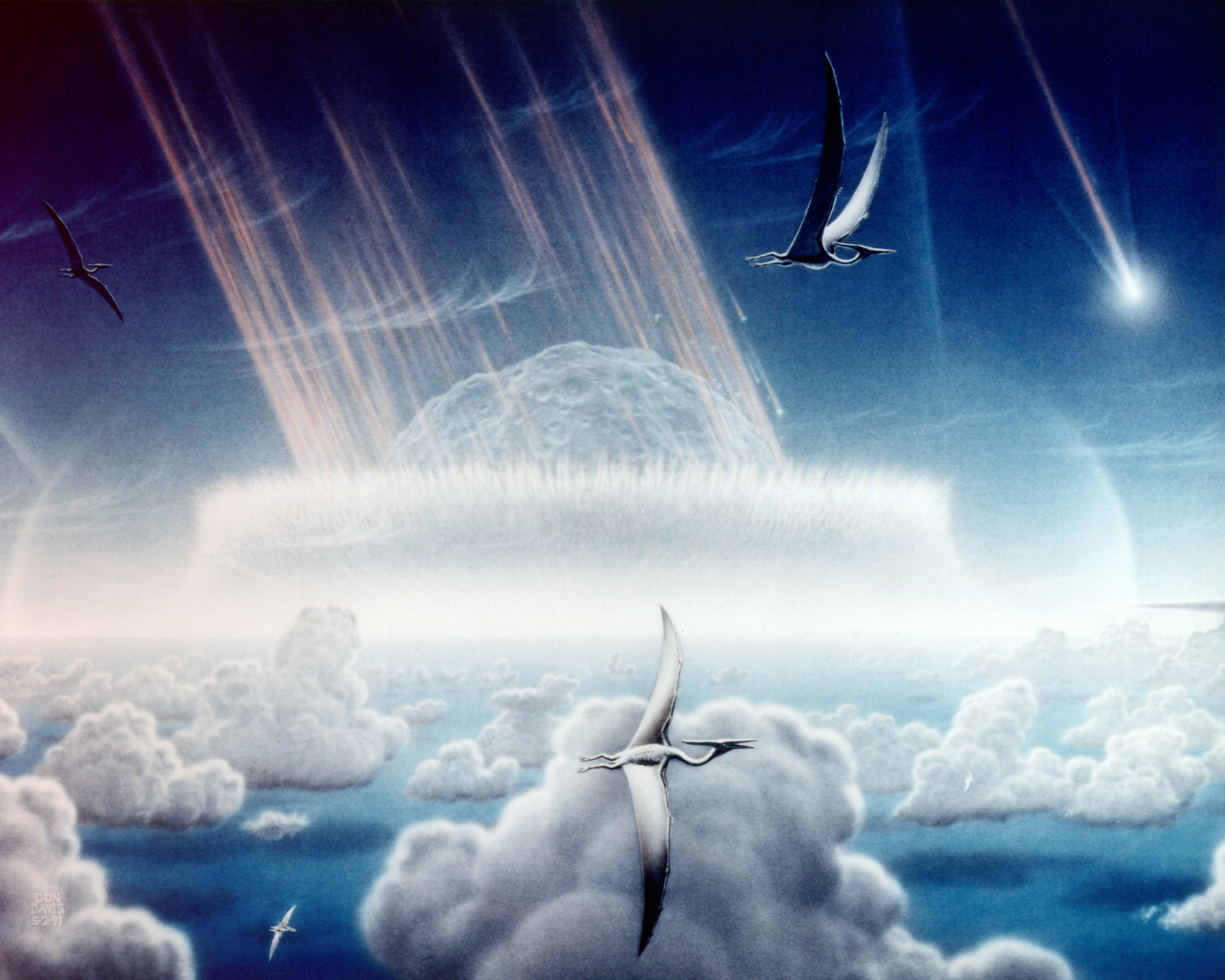
Artistic impression of an asteroid slamming into tropical, shallow seas of the sulfur-rich Yucatán Peninsula in what is today Southeast Mexico. The aftermath of this immense asteroid collision, which occurred approximately 66 million years ago, is believed to have caused the mass extinction of non-avian dinosaurs and many other species on Earth. The impact spewed hundreds of billions of tons of sulfur into the atmosphere, producing a worldwide blackout and freezing temperatures which persisted for at least a decade.

An impact winter is a hypothesized period of prolonged cold climate due to an impact event upon the Earth's planetary surface by a large asteroid or comet. If such meteors were to survive atmospheric entry and successfully impact land or a shallow body of water, it would eject an enormous amount of debris, dust, ash and other particulate materials into Earth's atmosphere, blocking off irradiance from the Sun. This would lead to global dimming and cause the climatic temperature to decrease drastically. If an asteroid or comet with the diameter of about 5 km (3.1 mi) or more were to hit in a deep body of water or explode mid-air before hitting the surface, there would still be an enormous amount of debris released into the atmosphere.

It has been proposed that the rapid climate shifts associated with impact winters could cause severe floral disruptions and subsequently cascading collapse of food chains, leading to mass extinctions of the Earth's biosphere that wipe out many of the world's extant species. An example of such an event would be the Cretaceous–Paleogene extinction event, which probably involved a worldwide impact winter caused by the 10 km (6.2 mi) diameter Chicxulub impactor, and led to extinction of nearly all tetrapods weighing more than 25 kilograms (55 lb), which included all non-avian dinosaurs, pterosaurs and Mesozoic marine reptiles.

== Possibility of impact ==
Each year, the Earth is hit by 5 m (16 ft) diameter meteoroids that deliver an explosion 50 km (31 mi) above the surface with the power equivalent of one kiloton of TNT. The Earth is hit every day by a meteor less than 5 m (16 ft) in diameter that disintegrates before reaching the surface. The meteors that do make it to the surface tend to strike unpopulated areas and cause no harm. A human is more likely to die in a fire, flood, or other natural disaster than to die because of an asteroid or comet impact. Another study in 1994 found a 1-in-10,000 chance that the Earth will be hit by a large asteroid or comet with a diameter of about 2 km (1.2 mi) during the next century. This object would be capable of disrupting the ecosphere and would kill a large fraction of the world's population. One such object, Asteroid 1950 DA, currently has a 0.038% chance of colliding with Earth in the year 2880, though when first discovered the probability was 0.3%. The probability goes down as orbits are refined with additional measurements.

Over 300 short-period comets pass near larger planets, such as Saturn and Jupiter, which can change the comets' trajectories and could potentially put them into an Earth-crossing orbit. This could happen for long-period comets also but the chance is highest for short-period comets. The chance of these directly impacting Earth is far lower than a near-Earth object (NEO) impact. Victor Clube and Bill Napier support a controversial theory that a short-period comet in an Earth-crossing orbit does not need to impact to be hazardous, as it could disintegrate and cause a dust veil with possibilities of a "nuclear winter" scenario with long-term global cooling lasting for thousands of years (which they consider to be similar in probability to a 1 km impact).

== Necessary impact factors ==
The Earth experiences a never-ending barrage of cosmic debris. Small particles burn up as they enter the atmosphere and are visible as meteors. Many of them go unnoticed by the average person even though not all of them burn up before they hit the Earth's surface. Those that strike the surface are known as meteorites. Thus, not every object that hits the Earth will cause an extinction-level event or even cause any real harm. Objects release most of their kinetic energy in the atmosphere and will explode if they experience a column of atmosphere greater than or equal to their mass. Extinction-level impacts on the Earth occur about every 100 million years. Although extinction events happen very rarely, large projectiles can do severe damage. This section will discuss the nature of the hazards posed by projectiles as a function of their size and composition.

=== Size ===
A large asteroid or comet could collide with the Earth's surface with the force of hundreds to thousands of times the force of all the nuclear bombs on the Earth. For example, the Cretaceous–Paleogene extinction event has been proposed to have caused extinction of all non-avian dinosaurs 66 million years ago. Early estimates of this asteroid's size put it at about 10 km (6.2 mi) in diameter. This means it hit with nearly a force of 100,000,000 MT (418 ZJ). That is over six billion times larger than the atomic bomb yield (16 kilotons, 67 TJ) that was dropped on Hiroshima during WW2. This impactor excavated the Chicxulub crater that is 180 km (110 mi) in diameter. With an object this size, dust and debris would still be ejected into the atmosphere even if it hit the ocean, which is only 4 km (2.5 mi) deep. An asteroid, meteor, or comet would remain intact through the atmosphere by virtue of its sheer mass. However, an object smaller than 3 km (1.9 mi) would have to have a strong iron composition to breach the lower atmosphere — the troposphere or the lower levels of the stratosphere.

=== Composition ===
There are three different composition types for an asteroid or comet: metallic, stony and icy. The composition of the object determines whether or not it will make it to the Earth's surface in one piece, disintegrate before breaching the atmosphere, or break up and explode just before reaching the surface. A metallic object tends to be made up of iron and nickel alloys. These metallic objects are the most likely to impact the surface because they stand up better to the stresses of ram pressure induced flattening and fragmentation during deceleration in the atmosphere. The stony objects, like chondritic meteorites, tend to burn, break up, or explode before leaving the upper atmosphere. Those that do make it to the surface need a minimum energy of about 10 Mt (4×10^{16} J) or about 50 m (160 ft) diameter to breach the lower atmosphere (this is for a stony object hitting at 20 kilometres per second (40,000 mph)). The porous comet-like objects are made up of low-density silicates, organics, ice, volatile and often burn up in the upper atmosphere because of their low bulk density (≤1 g/cm^{3} (60 lb/cu ft)).

== Possible mechanisms ==
Although the asteroids and comets that impact the Earth hit with many times the explosive force of a volcano, the mechanisms of an impact winter are similar to those that occur after a mega-volcanic eruption-induced volcanic winter. In this scenario massive amounts of debris injected into the atmosphere would block some of the Sun's radiation for an extended period of time and lower the mean global temperature by as much as 20°C after a year. The two main mechanisms that could lead to an impact winter are mass ejection of regolith and multiple firestorms.

=== Mass ejection of regolith ===
This diagram shows the size distribution in micrometres of various types of atmospheric particulate matter.

In a study conducted by Curt Covey et al., it was found that an asteroid about 10 km (6.2 mi) in diameter with the explosive force of about 10^{8} MT could send upward of about 2.5 × 10^{15} kg of 1 μm sized aerosol particles into the atmosphere. Anything larger would fall quickly back to the surface. These particles would then be spread throughout the atmosphere and absorb or refract the sunlight before it is able to reach the surface, cooling the planet in a similar fashion as the sulfurous aerosol rising from a megavolcano, producing deep global dimming. This is controversially purported to have occurred following the Toba eruption.

These pulverized rock particles would remain in the atmosphere until dry deposition and due to their size, they would also act as cloud condensation nuclei and would be washed out by wet deposition/precipitation, but even then, about 15% of the sun's radiation might not reach the surface. After the first 20 days, the land temperature might drop quickly, by about 13°C. After about a year, the temperature could rebound by about 6°C, but by this time about one-third of the Northern Hemisphere might be covered in ice.

However, this effect could be largely mitigated, even reversed, by a release of enormous quantities of water vapor and carbon dioxide caused by the initial global heat pulse after the impact. If the asteroid hit an ocean (which would be the case with the majority of impact events), water vapor would form the majority of any ejected matter, and would likely result in a major greenhouse effect and a net increase in temperature.

If the impact event is sufficiently energetic it might cause mantle plume (volcanism) at the antipodal point (the opposite side of the world). This volcanism could alone therefore create a volcanic winter, irrespective of the other impact effects.

=== Multiple firestorms ===
In combination with the initial debris ejected into the atmosphere, if the impactor is extremely large (3 km (1.9 mi) or more), like at the Cretaceous–Paleogene extinction event (estimated 10 km (6.2 mi)), there might be the ignition of multiple fire storms, possibly with a global reach into every dense and therefore firestorm-prone forest. These wood fires might release enough amounts of water vapor, ash, soot, tar and carbon dioxide into the atmosphere to perturb the climate on their own and cause the pulverized rock dust cloud blocking the sun to last longer. Alternatively it could cause it to last for a much shorter time, as there would be more water vapor for the rocky aerosol particles to form cloud condensation nuclei. If it causes the dust cloud to last longer, it would prolong the Earth's cooling time, possibly causing thicker ice sheets to form.

== Past events ==
In 2016, a scientific drilling project drilled deep into the peak ring of the Chicxulub impact crater to obtain rock core samples from the impact itself. This crater is one of the best known impact craters and was the impact responsible for the extinction of the non-avian dinosaurs.

The discoveries were widely seen as confirming current theories related to both the crater impact and its effects. They confirmed that the rock comprising the peak ring had been subjected to immense pressures and forces, and had been melted by immense heat and shocked by immense pressure from its usual state into its present form in just minutes. The fact that the peak ring was made of granite was also significant, since granite is not a rock found in sea-floor deposits — it originates much deeper in the earth and had been ejected to the surface by the immense pressures of impact. Gypsum, a sulfate-containing rock that is usually present in the shallow seabed of the region, had been almost entirely removed and must therefore have been almost entirely vaporized and entered the atmosphere, and that the event was immediately followed by a huge megatsunami (a massive movement of sea waters) sufficient to lay down the largest known layer of sand separated by grain size directly above the peak ring.

These strongly support the hypothesis that the impactor was large enough to create a 120-mile peak ring, eject molten granite from deep within the earth, create colossal water movements, and eject an immense quantity of vaporized rock and sulfates into the atmosphere, where they would have persisted for a long time. This global dispersion of dust and sulfates would have led to a sudden and catastrophic effect on the climate worldwide by causing large temperature drops, devastating the food chain.

== Impact on humans ==
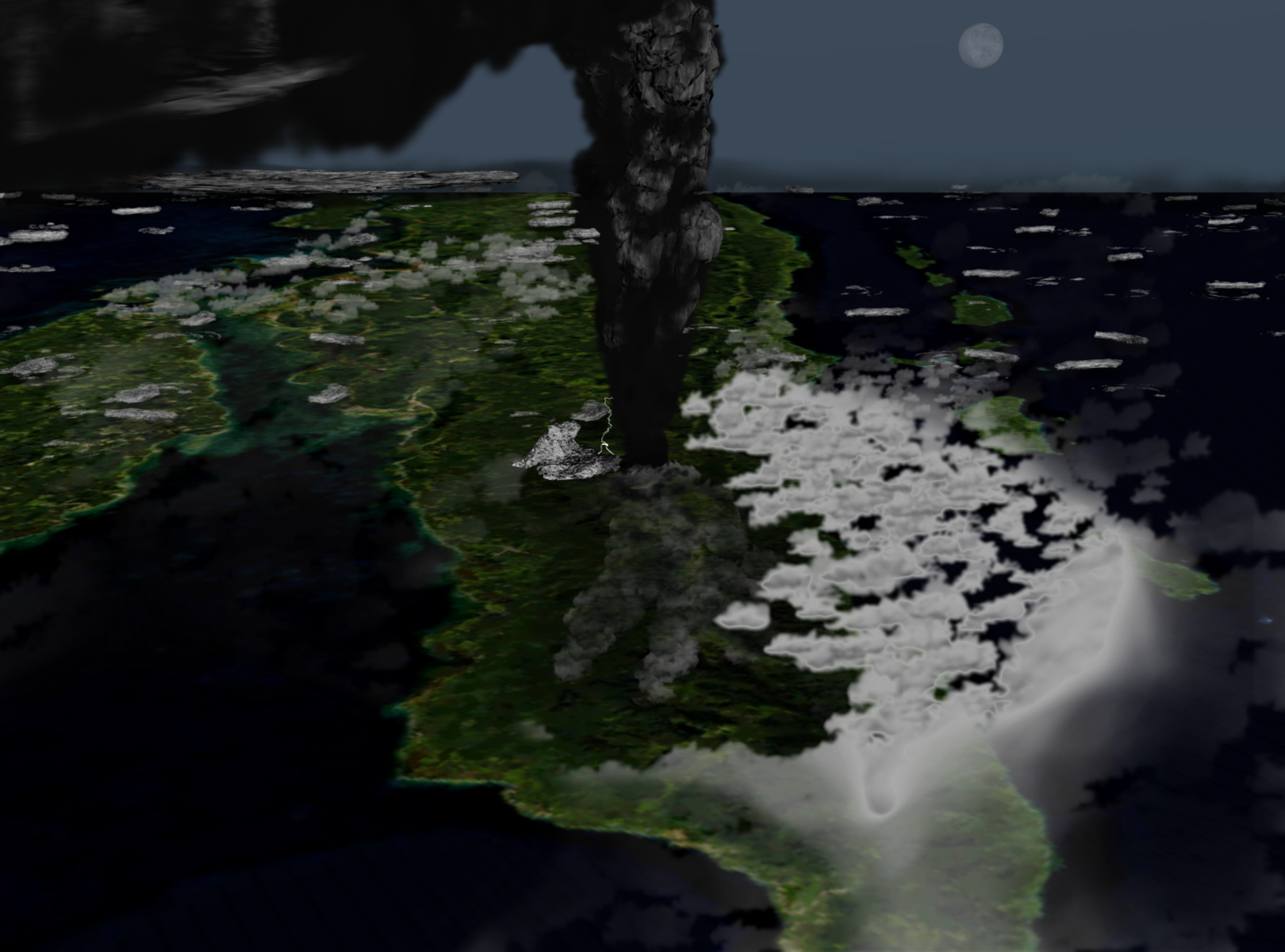
Artist's impression of the Toba eruption, circa 74,000 years ago. Some scientists believe this eruption led to a population collapse and subsequent genetic bottleneck in humans.

An impact winter would have a devastating effect on humans, as well as the other species on Earth. With the sun's radiation being severely diminished, the first species to die would be plants and animals who survive through the process of photosynthesis. This lack of food would ultimately lead to other mass extinctions of other animals that are higher up on the food chain and possibly kill up to 25% of the human population. Depending on location and size of the initial impact, the cost of clean-up efforts could be so high as to cause an economic crisis for the survivors. These factors would make life on Earth, for humans, extremely difficult.

=== Agriculture ===
With the Earth's atmosphere full of dust and other material, radiation from the sun would be refracted and scattered back into space and absorbed by this debris. The first effect on the Earth, after the blast wave and potential multiple fire storms, would be the death of most, if not all, of the photosynthetic life forms on Earth. Those in the ocean that survive would possibly become dormant until the sun came out again. Those on land could possibly be kept alive in underground microclimates, with one such example being the Zbrašov aragonite caves. Greenhouses in underground complexes with fossil or nuclear energy power stations could conceivably keep artificial sunlight growing lamps on until the atmosphere began to clear. Meanwhile, those outside that were not killed by the lack of sunlight would most likely be killed or kept dormant by the extreme cold of the impact winter. This death of plants might lead to a long period of famine if enough people survived the initial blast wave and would result in increased food costs in undeveloped countries only a few months after the first crop failures. Developed countries wouldn't encounter famine unless the cooling event was to last longer than a year, due to larger canned food and grain stockpiles in these countries. However, if the impactor was similar in size to the K/T boundary impactor, agricultural losses might not be compensated with imports to the northern hemisphere from the southern hemisphere or vice versa. The only way to keep from starving would be for each country to amass at least a year's worth of food for their people. Not many countries have this; the world's average cereal stock levels are only about 30% of the yearly production.

=== Economics ===
The cost to clean up after an asteroid or comet impact would cost billions to trillions of dollars, depending on the location impacted. An impact in New York City (the 16th most populated city in the world) could cost billions of dollars in financial losses and it could take years for the financial sector (i.e. stock market) to recover. However, the probability of such a naturally specifically aimed impact would be exceedingly low.

=== Survivability ===
As of February 20, 2018, there are 17,841 near-Earth objects known. 8,059 potentially hazardous objects are known; they are larger than 140 m (460 ft) and may approach the Earth closer than 20 times the distance to the Moon. 888 NEAs larger than 1 km have been discovered, or 96.5% of an estimated total of about 920.

== See also ==
- Asteroid deflection strategies – Methods to prevent destructive asteroid hits
- Earth Impact Database – Database of impact structures on Earth
- Global dimming – Reduction in the amount of sunlight reaching Earth's surface
- Impact event – Collision of two astronomical objects
- List of notable asteroids
- Near-Earth objects – Small Solar System body with an orbit that can bring it close to Earth
- Nuclear winter – Hypothetical climatic effect of nuclear war
- Volcanic winter – Temperature anomaly event caused by a volcanic eruption
- Asteroids in fiction
- Comets in fiction
