= Peter V. Hobbs =

British-born atmospheric physicist, meteorologist

Peter Victor Hobbs (1936–2005) was a British-born professor of atmospheric sciences and director of the Cloud and Aerosol Research Group at the University of Washington. His research interests were in the physics and chemistry of the atmosphere, focusing on the roles played by aerosols, clouds, and precipitation. He authored over 250 peer-reviewed papers, authored four books, and edited three books. He was the coauthor with John Michael Wallace of what is generally considered the standard introductory textbook in the field: Atmospheric Science: An Introductory Survey.
