= David Cenciotti =

Italian aviation expert and journalist

- Born: 1975 (age 50–51); Rome, Italy
- Education: University degree in computer engineering
- Occupations: Pilot; Author; Aviation expert/consultant; Cybersecurity professional; Journalist; Chief editor
- Known for: Founder and editor of The Aviationist; aviation and defence reporting
- Military service
- Branch: Aeronautica Militare (Italian Air Force, lit. 'military aeronautics')
- Service years: 1998–2000
- Rank: Second lieutenant
- Military occupation: Public information officer
- Education: Scuola di guerra aerea (Air War School of the Italian Air Force)

David Cenciotti, born 1975 (age 50–51); is an Italian former commissioned officer of the Aeronautica Militare, pilot, cybersecurity professional, author, aviation expert, and founder and chief editor of The Aviationist, an aviation- and defence-focused news website.

Cenciotti has authored several books and holds a degree in computer engineering. His commentary and work has been hosted by Business Insider, MSN, and New Delhi TV, among other news outlets and works, and he is regularly cited by official military publications.

== Early life and military service ==
Cenciotti was born in Rome, Italy in 1975 and obtained a university degree in computer engineering. After obtaining a civilian private pilot's license, Cenciotti commissioned into the Italian Air Force (ItAF) as a second lieutenant and served from 1998 to 2000 as a public information officer. Cenciotti flew "several combat planes", including the F-104 Starfighter. Cenciotti also attended the ItAF's ’‘Scuola di guerra aerea’’ (Air War School).

== Reporting and authorship ==
Cenciotti began aviation and defence reporting in 1996 and in 2006 he founded The Aviationist, an online platform for defence- and aviation-related news, opinion pieces, and commentary, where he also serves as the chief editor. Cenciotti has reported on the stealth Blackhawk helicopters used in the killing of Osama Bin Laden, the testing of aircraft at Area 51, as well as on aviation-based controversies. Cenciotti has written and commented extensively on the Lockheed Martin F-35 Lightning II program, with Italy providing funding for the F-35's development, and operating both the "A"- and "B"-variants; Cenciotti has written regarding "jailbreaking" the F-35's software, arguing that that the Lightning II is "not a commercial [computer]" and that it would be difficult to modify the secure software. Cenciotti has further analyzed the stealth aspects of the Lightning II, and has otherwise reported on the aircraft's use by the ItAF, including trials concerning landing and taking-off from highways. His contributions to Business Insider include analysis of Iran's attempts to build a stealth aircraft, the IAIO Qaher-313, and he has been referenced by The Times of Israel regarding the alleged aircraft.

Cenciotti's work and commentary has been featured on and via (Note: Published by The Aviationist but featured by and/or on various outlets) Business Insider, MSN, RealClearDefense, and NDTV, among other entities. His work has additionally been featured or referenced by the Air Force Institute of Technology of the United States Air Force (USAF), the USAF's Air & Space Power Journal and the Naval War College Review of the United States Navy. Cenciotti was also interviewed for Annie Jacobsen's 2016 Nuclear War: A Scenario, a New York Times Best Seller list non-fiction book concerning a hypothetical nuclear first strike against the United States by North Korea. The ItAF has featured Cenciotti on live-stream programming.

Cenciotti's books include the official 50th-anniversary celebration book commissioned by the ItAF's Frecce Tricolori aerial performance team, Frecce tricolori. Un volo lungo cinquant’anni (English: Tricolour Arrows: An Exciting Fifty Years of Flight); Brrrttt… Deployments, War Chronicles and Stories of the Last A-10 Warthogs; and Italian Starfighters, a photobook chronicling the F-104 Starfighter's use by the ItAF.

Cenciotti has been critical of the Italian government's budget-cuts while lauding increased defence-spending, opining in 2013:

"The Italian military struggles to remain efficient in times of global financial crisis and ever-shrinking budgets. Earlier this year a Spending Review was presented by the Defense Minister of the Monti technocratic cabinet, a reform that seeks to balance the spending for personnel, operations and investment to ensure the future financial sustainability and operational effectiveness of the armed forces."

== Reception ==
Cenciotti has been described by American military journalist David Axe as a "noted expert" and by Business Insider as being "among the best and most cited" of military journalists. Business Insider further described Cenciotti's coverage and analysis of the use of stealth helicopters during the killing of Osama Bin Laden as "famous". The Hellenic Air Force has described The Aviationist as "one of world’s most visited and famous military aviation" websites. The Aviationist has been further described as "one of the world’s most popular aviation sites" by Indian defence analysis website Livefist. In 2011, American cryptographer and author Bruce Schneier asserted that "The Aviationist has consistently had the best analysis" regarding Israeli, Iranian, and United States unmanned combat aerial vehicles (military drones).

In 2014, Cenciotti was criticized by the R Street Institute (a U.S. think-tank) for "singing the praises" of the Lockheed Martin-Boeing F-22 Raptor, though he is quoted as stating:

"The U.S. has invested a lot in the F-22 Raptor and the U.S. Air Force has worked so much in the last few years to turn the troubled, expensive interceptor into a real multi-role platform that could be eventually used in a real operation[… a 2014 combat debut in Syria] was also the chance to appease those who criticized the costly stealth plane and the fact it was never used in combat until a couple of days ago[.]"

== Personal life ==
Cenciotti lives in Rome, Italy and is married with two children, and also works professionally in the cybersecurity field.
