= Biological War: A Scenario =

2026 book by Annie Jacobsen

Biological War: A Scenario is a 2026 nonfiction book by American investigative journalist Annie Jacobsen. Published in the United States by Dutton on July 28, 2026, the book examines the potential consequences of a large-scale biological attack or the accidental release of an engineered pathogen.

The book uses a fictional near-future catastrophe to describe how governments, health systems, armed forces and civilian populations might respond to the rapid spread of a highly lethal biological agent. It combines the fictional scenario with accounts of historical biological-weapons programmes, interviews with scientists and national-security officials, and discussion of advances in genetic engineering, synthetic biology and artificial intelligence. It is a thematic successor to Jacobsen's 2024 book Nuclear War: A Scenario, which employed a similar narrative technique to describe the escalation of a hypothetical nuclear conflict.

== Background ==
Jacobsen is an investigative journalist whose previous books have concentrated on military technology, intelligence and national-security programmes. Her books include Area 51 (2011), Operation Paperclip (2014), The Pentagon's Brain (2015), Phenomena (2017), First Platoon (2021) and Nuclear War: A Scenario (2024). The Pentagon's Brain was a finalist for the 2016 Pulitzer Prize for History.

Biological War followed the commercial success of Nuclear War: A Scenario. Like that book, it uses what Jacobsen describes as a "scenario": a fictional sequence of events constructed using interviews, documentary research and established government procedures and technologies.

Jacobsen has argued that biological weapons present a distinctive danger because, unlike conventional or nuclear weapons, a biological agent may reproduce after its release, spread independently across national borders and evolve. She has also argued that developments in artificial intelligence could lower technical barriers to designing dangerous biological agents while simultaneously providing tools for detecting outbreaks and developing countermeasures.

== Synopsis ==
The book begins with a discussion of the Soviet Union's secret biological-weapons programme, including Biopreparat and research conducted at facilities such as the Vector Institute in Siberia. Although the Soviet Union was a party to the 1972 Biological Weapons Convention, it maintained an extensive clandestine programme involving pathogens capable of being developed for military purposes.

Jacobsen then introduces a fictional scenario involving the release of an engineered pathogen following an incident at a Russian biological research facility. The agent combines characteristics intended to make it unusually transmissible and lethal. As infections spread, governments initially struggle to determine whether the outbreak is natural, accidental or an act of biological warfare.

The narrative follows the response through successive hours, days and weeks. Public-health authorities attempt to identify the pathogen and develop countermeasures while political and military leaders confront questions of quarantine, attribution and national security. The inability to rapidly contain transmission produces escalating pressure on hospitals, supply chains and government institutions.

As the epidemic expands, ordinary mechanisms of civil government deteriorate. Quarantines and movement restrictions become increasingly difficult to enforce, while military forces assume a larger role in maintaining order and protecting critical infrastructure. Jacobsen ultimately depicts a severely depopulated and militarised post-pandemic United States.

The fictional narrative is periodically interrupted by sections presenting historical material, including the development of biological warfare programmes and previous government exercises designed to simulate biological attacks. One example discussed in commentary surrounding the book is Operation Dark Winter, a 2001 American exercise that modelled a deliberate smallpox attack on several US cities and examined the resulting strain on government and public-health institutions.

== Themes ==
=== Biological weapons ===
A central argument of the book is that biological weapons differ fundamentally from other weapons of mass destruction because the weapon itself can be self-replicating. Jacobsen contrasts biological agents with nuclear weapons, whose production generally requires specialised infrastructure and access to controlled materials.

The book discusses the historical development of state biological-weapons programmes and the possibility that future threats could come not only from governments but also from smaller organisations or individuals possessing advanced biological knowledge.

=== Artificial intelligence and biotechnology ===
Jacobsen also examines the interaction between artificial intelligence and biotechnology. She argues that AI-assisted biological design could make capabilities previously requiring specialised expertise increasingly accessible. At the same time, she describes AI-based epidemiological surveillance as a potential defence against emerging outbreaks.

Among the systems discussed by Jacobsen is the World Health Organization's Epidemic Intelligence from Open Sources (EIOS) initiative, which uses large-scale analysis of publicly available information to identify potential disease outbreaks.

=== Preparedness ===
Another theme is the difficulty governments face in preparing for events that are both extremely unlikely and potentially catastrophic. The book examines problems including early detection, vaccine availability, medical capacity, attribution of an attack, continuity of government and the enforcement of public-health restrictions.

Jacobsen presents the fictional catastrophe not as a prediction but as one possible scenario. In discussing the approach, she distinguishes the book from an attempt to forecast a single inevitable future.

== Publication ==
Biological War: A Scenario was published in the United States by Dutton on July 28, 2026. The US edition is 432 pages and carries the ISBN 979-8-217-04603-4.

In Australia, the book was published by Torva as a 432-page trade paperback on August 4, 2026, with ISBN 978-1-911742-03-6.

== Reception ==
The book received attention for both the plausibility of the risks it describes and the deliberately catastrophic nature of its scenario.

Writing in The New Yorker, Gideon Lewis-Kraus described Biological War as a "sequel of sorts" to Nuclear War and noted that the hypothetical narrative is interspersed with historical sections. He wrote that the imagined events are, for the most part, grounded in highly plausible details, while questioning whether the scenario format can adequately represent genuinely unprecedented catastrophes.

An editorial commentary in The Washington Post described the book as a warning about the possibility of catastrophic biological events, comparing its concerns with lessons from the 2001 Dark Winter exercise and arguing that accidents or malicious actors could create risks extending as far as human extinction.

A review in Christianity Today described Jacobsen's scenario as vividly depicting global biological catastrophe but criticised the book for providing relatively little practical guidance about how individuals might prepare for such an event.

== See also ==
- Gain-of-function research
- Pandemic
- Sverdlovsk anthrax leak
- 2026 Russian plague outbreak
