= Area 51: An Uncensored History of America's Top Secret Military Base =

2011 book by Annie Jacobsen

- Author: Annie Jacobsen
- Language: English
- Genre: Nonfiction
- Published: 2011 (Little Brown)
- Publication place: United States
- ISBN: 978-0-316-19385-6

Area 51: An Uncensored History of America's Top Secret Military Base is a book by American journalist Annie Jacobsen about the secret United States military base Area 51.

== Content ==
The book, based on interviews with scientists and engineers who worked in Area 51, addresses the Roswell UFO incident and dismisses the alien story. Instead, it claims that Josef Mengele was recruited by the Soviet leader Joseph Stalin to produce "grotesque, child-size aviators" to be remotely piloted and landed in America to cause hysteria in the likeness of Orson Welles' 1938 radio drama War of the Worlds, but that the aircraft crashed and the incident was hushed up by the Americans. Jacobsen writes that the bodies found at the crash site were children. Grotesquely but similarly deformed, aged around 12, each under five feet tall, with large heads and abnormally shaped oversize eyes. "They were neither aliens nor consenting airmen, but human guinea pigs", she claims. Jacobson also interviews Richard Mingus who outlines an incident whereby Area 6 was attacked at gunpoint during the preparation of a nuclear test detonation.

== Reception ==
=== Reviews ===
The book received mixed reviews. The Los Angeles Times called it "highly readable" and "deeply researched ... a dream for aviation and military buffs." Time magazine wrote that "Area 51 suffers one flaw", referring to the Roswell craft that Jacobsen reports was a Soviet hoax. The Daily Beast called it an "explosive new book". The New York Times wrote: "Although this connect-the-dots U.F.O. thesis is only a hasty-sounding addendum to an otherwise straightforward investigative book about aviation and military history, it makes an indelible impression. Area 51 is liable to become best known for sci-fi provocation." The Times noted that "the book is noteworthy for its author's dogged devotion to her research."

Other reviews have been less positive. Space historian Dwayne Day, for instance, called Area 51 a "poorly-sourced, error-filled book" in which the author makes an argument that "defies common sense" and is reliant on one anonymous source. Jeffrey T. Richelson and Robert S. Norris, critiquing Jacobsen's factual errors on the blog Washington Decoded, stated that "[t]here are so many mistakes that it is hard to know where to begin ... Area 51 is a case study of how not to research and write about top-secret activities." Historian Richard Rhodes, writing in The Washington Post, also criticized the book's sensationalistic reporting of "old news" and its "error-ridden" reporting. He wrote: "All of [her main source's] claims appear in one or another of the various publicly available Roswell/UFO/Area 51 books and documents churned out by believers, charlatans and scholars over the past 60 years. In attributing the stories she reports to an unnamed engineer and Manhattan Project veteran while seemingly failing to conduct even minimal research into the man's sources, Jacobsen shows herself at a minimum extraordinarily gullible or journalistically incompetent." The book was sharply criticized for extensive errors in an essay by Robert Norris and Jeffrey Richelson, senior fellows at the Federation of American Scientists and the National Security Archive respectively. In a 2024 interview with Lex Fridman, Jacobsen revealed the single source of the Roswell UFO incident alleged to be a Soviet hoax as Alfred O'Donnell, who worked for EG&G at Area 51 in the early 1950s. Historians, journalists, and aviation experts have widely dismissed O'Donnell's claim.

== Bibliography ==
- Area 51: An Uncensored History of America's Top Secret Military Base. Little, Brown. 17 May 2011. ISBN 978-0-316-19385-6.
