= Alex Wellerstein =

Historian of science

Academic background
- Education: UC Berkeley (B.A.); Harvard University (PhD)
- Thesis: Knowledge and the Bomb: Nuclear Secrecy in the United States, 1939–2008 (2010)
- Doctoral advisor: Peter Galison

Academic work
- Discipline: Historian
- Sub-discipline: History of nuclear weapons, History of science and technology
- Institutions: Stevens Institute of Technology; American Institute of Physics

Alex Wellerstein is a historian of science at the Stevens Institute of Technology who studies the history of nuclear weapons. He is the creator of NUKEMAP.

== Background ==
Wellerstein grew up in Stockton, California. He received a Bachelors of Arts in history from University of California, Berkeley in 2002 and a doctorate in the history of science from Harvard University in 2010. He was once a graduate fellow for the United States Department of Energy, a lecturer at Harvard University, a postdoctoral researcher at the Harvard Kennedy School, and an associate historian at the American Institute of Physics. Since 2014, he has been a professor of Science and Technology Studies at the Stevens Institute of Technology. As of August 2025, he is a visiting researcher at the Center for International Studies at Sciences Po in Paris.

In 2021, his book Restricted Data: The History of Nuclear Secrecy in the United States was published by the University of Chicago Press. In 2025, his book The Most Awful Responsibility: Truman and the Secret Struggle for Control of the Atomic Age was published by HarperCollins.

== Selected publications ==
- "Patenting the bomb: Nuclear weapons, intellectual property, and technological control," Isis 99, no. 1 (March 2008): 57–87.
- "Inside the Atomic Patent Office," Bulletin of the Atomic Scientists 64, no. 2 (May/June 2008): 26–31, 60–61.
- "From Classified to Commonplace: The Trajectory of the Hydrogen Bomb 'Secret'," Endeavour 32, no. 2 (June 2008): 47–52. doi:10.1016/j.endeavour.2008.03.002
- "Die geheimen Patente – eine andere Sicht auf die Atombombe," in Atombilder: Ikongraphien des Atoms in Wissenschaft und Öffentlichkeit des 20. Jahrhundertsts, ed. Jochen Hennig and Charlotte Bigg (Berlin: Wallstein Verlag, 2009): 159–167.
- "States of Eugenics: Institutions and the Practices of Compulsory Sterilization in California," in Sheila Jasanoff, ed., Reframing Rights: Bioconstitutionalism in the Genetic Age (Cambridge, Mass.: MIT Press, 2011): 29–58.
- "A Tale of Openness and Secrecy: The Philadelphia Story," Physics Today 65, no. 5 (May 2012), 47–53. doi:10.1063/PT.3.1560
- "Manhattan Project," Encyclopedia for the History of Science (April 2019). doi:10.34758/9aaa-ne35
- (with Edward Geist), "The secret of the Soviet hydrogen bomb," Physics Today 70, no. 4 (March 2017), 40–47. doi:10.1063/PT.3.3524
- "John Wheeler's H-bomb Blues," Physics Today 72, no. 4 (2019): 42–51. doi:10.1063/PT.3.4364
- "The Kyoto Misconception: What Truman Knew, and Didn't Know, About Hiroshima," in Michael D. Gordin and G. John Ikenberry, eds., The Age of Hiroshima (Princeton, N.J.: Princeton University Press, 2020): 34–55. ISBN 9780691193458
- "Counting the Dead at Hiroshima and Nagasaki," Bulletin of the Atomic Scientists (4 August 2020).
- Restricted Data: The History of Nuclear Secrecy in the United States (Chicago: University of Chicago Press, 2021). ISBN 9780226020389
- "The Untold Story of the World's Biggest Nuclear Bomb," Bulletin of the Atomic Scientists (29 October 2021).
- The Most Awful Responsibility: Truman and the Secret Struggle for Control of the Atomic Age (New York: Harper, 2025). ISBN 9780063379435
