= Nuclear War: A Scenario =

2024 book by Annie Jacobsen

- Author: Annie Jacobsen
- Language: English
- Genre: Nonfiction
- Published: 2024
- Publisher: Dutton; Transworld
- Publication place: United States
- Pages: 400
- ISBN: 978-0593476093

Nuclear War: A Scenario is a 2024 book by American journalist Annie Jacobsen, published by Dutton and Transworld. The book combines historical analysis of U.S. nuclear war planning with a minute-by-minute account of a hypothetical first strike by North Korea against the United States, showing how the conflict escalates to global thermonuclear war within 72 minutes, leading to nuclear winter and 5 billion deaths. The work examines both the historical development of American nuclear doctrine since the 1960s and contemporary protocols that would govern U.S. response to a nuclear attack.

== Summary ==
The book presents a fictional but fact-based nuclear war scenario, constructed from expert interviews and declassified documents. In the Prologue, Jacobsen depicts how a one-megaton thermonuclear detonation above the Pentagon would kill one million people in 90 seconds, and why such an attack would inevitably escalate into a global conflict ending human civilization.

Part I, the only historical background of the book, examines secret U.S. nuclear war planning, particularly a classified 1960 meeting at U.S. Strategic Command where military officials finalized plans for nuclear war against the Soviet Union that would have killed 600 million people.

The initial 24 minutes of the scenario form Part II. North Korea launches a surprise ICBM toward Washington, D.C. followed by a second nuclear missile targeting California's Diablo Canyon Nuclear Power Plant. U.S. defense systems fail to intercept either warhead. The president, initially evacuated for safety, eventually authorizes massive nuclear retaliation with 82 warheads against North Korea.

Communication breakdown and escalating retaliation form the core of the next 24 minutes of the scenario (Part III). Russia's flawed Tundra satellite system overestimates the number of incoming U.S. missiles, leading Russia to conclude it is under attack and retaliate with over 900 nuclear warheads aimed at the U.S. and NATO countries.

The concluding 24 minutes (Part IV) culminate in global nuclear apocalypse. The United States and NATO launch their remaining nuclear arsenals at Russia, while North Korea detonates a Super-EMP weapon 300 miles above the United States, destroying all electrical systems. Within 72 minutes, 1,000 Russian nuclear warheads strike the U.S. and Europe, resulting in hundreds of millions of deaths.

Part V examines the long-term consequences: nuclear winter lasting 10 years, global famine killing 5 billion people, and the eventual collapse of civilization.

== Background ==
=== Development and conception ===
Nuclear War: A Scenario develops a concept introduced in the final chapter of Jacobsen's Surprise, Kill, Vanish. In that earlier work, Billy Waugh tells Vo Dien Bien and Colonel Bon Giong—the son and former aide-de-camp of General Giap—that the U.S. had seriously considered using a Special Atomic Demolition Munition to sever the Ho Chi Minh trail and that he regretted they didn't. Jacobsen, who fundamentally disagreed with Waugh's view on using a nuclear weapon on a battlefield, concluded that section with a quote that foreshadowed her next book: "Every nation wants to win at any cost. Except the cost and consequences of nuclear war."

Nuclear War: A Scenario is Jacobsen's seventh book. It rests on raw material Jacobsen collected during fifteen years of interviewing people for prior works. The seed for the book was planted in 2014 when Paul S. Kozemchak, special assistant to the director of DARPA, shared with her that the USA and the USSR had each detonated two test nuclear bombs in space during the Cuban Missile Crisis. This "testing [of] fate" was echoed fifty-six years later when on January 1 and 2, 2018, Donald Trump and Kim Jong Un had a short but heated exchange on Twitter on the respective sizes of their nuclear buttons, which led Jacobsen to start to wonder what would happen if deterrence failed. "What if the words of the deputy commander of STRATCOM, [...] Lieutenant General Thomas Bussiere, [spoken] to an inner circle was true: 'deterrence holds unless it doesn't, and then it all unravels'. That word 'unravels' [...] really underpinned my narrative, because that is exactly what happens, and it happens fast." (Note: The words "everything unravels" come from Rachel S. Cohen's article: "Every capability in the DoD is underpinned by the fact that strategic deterrence will hold. Everything unravels itself if those things are not true,” [Bussiere] told Sandia National Laboratories staff in August.") As Jacobsen was probing the foundations of deterrence, the generation that had experienced nuclear blasts was disappearing, which gave yet more urgency to passing on their message. Through her interviews with engineers who worked on thermonuclear weapons, Jacobsen noted a common theme: many "lived in fear of the day when everyone [...] who had been alive and had seen [a nuclear explosion] was dead, and no one would remember. [This is why] so many of the Cold War warriors who spoke to me on the record did so because they have that fear that where we are headed is [...] stemming from a [...] lack of information, lack of knowledge about the history of the bombs."

Writing in New Scientist, Jacobsen stated she wrote the book "to demonstrate—in appalling, minute-by-minute detail—just how horrifying a nuclear war would be," echoing UN secretary-general António Guterres's August 2022 warning at the Nuclear Non-Proliferation Treaty Review Conference that "Humanity is one misunderstanding, one miscalculation away from nuclear annihilation." "This is madness. We must reverse course."

Lastly, Shane Salerno gave Jacobsen the idea for her book and worked with her on the manuscript during COVID, in 2020. Nuclear War: A Scenario was published on March 26, 2024.

=== Literary and historical context ===
Nuclear War: A Scenario builds upon a long tradition of nuclear war literature and analysis that has evolved since the atomic age began. When asked about works that informed her understanding of nuclear war, Jacobsen has highlighted several key American texts. Among them is John Hersey's Hiroshima (1946), which pioneered the minute-by-minute documentation of nuclear catastrophe through eyewitness accounts. Next is historian William L. Shirer who offered not only a stark assessment of future warfare in the preface to his 1960 work The Rise and Fall of the Third Reich but also encapsulated a summary of Jacobsen's own work, warning that the next great war "will be launched by suicidal little madmen pressing an electronic button. Such a war will not last long and none will ever follow it. There will be no conquerors and no conquests, but only the charred bones of the dead on an uninhabited planet.". Finally, Fred Kaplan who exposed in The Wizards of Armageddon (1983) the strategic thinking behind nuclear war planning.

The book also draws comparisons to other seminal works in nuclear literature, with reviewers noting connections to Jonathan Schell's influential 1982 work The Fate of the Earth, which provided one of the most influential examinations of nuclear war's potential consequences. Earlier fictional treatments of nuclear conflict, including Nevil Shute's On the Beach (1957) and the television film The Day After (1983), demonstrated the power of narrative to influence public opinion and policy—a tradition Jacobsen explicitly hopes to continue.

Jacobsen's approach differs from previous works by combining the documentary rigor of policy analysis with the immediate, real-time narrative structure more commonly found in fiction. Unlike the retrospective approach of Hersey's Hiroshima or the theoretical framework of Schell's The Fate of the Earth, Jacobsen presents a forward-looking scenario grounded in contemporary military capabilities and protocols. Her work also distinguishes itself from earlier Cold War-era analyses by incorporating modern nuclear threats, including electromagnetic pulse weapons and the multi-polar nuclear landscape of the 21st century. For her "literary north-star" in crafting speculative non-fiction, a first for her, Jacobsen drew inspiration from Alan Weisman's The World Without Us, which similarly presents a meticulously researched scenario of potential future events.

== Synopsis ==
The book opens with an Author's Note in which Jacobsen emphasizes four key points. First, the U.S. government has spent trillions of dollars since the early 1950s preparing for nuclear war and ensuring continuity of government during such conflicts. Second, while the book's scenario is fictional, it is constructed from facts gathered through interviews with experts and declassified government documents. Third, she chose to assume Washington D.C. would be struck by a one-megaton bomb because a "Bolt out of the Blue" attack represents what American defense officials fear most. Finally, following U.S. retaliation, a general nuclear war would necessarily ensue and end to human civilization, or as former STRATCOM Commander General Robert Kehler observed: "The world could end in the next couple of hours."

=== Prologue ===
The prologue introduces the immediate consequences of the hypothetical scenario developed in the book. In the milliseconds following the detonation of a one-megaton thermonuclear weapon above the Pentagon, temperatures reach 180 million degrees Fahrenheit, instantly carbonizing its 27,000 employees. "Ground zero is zeroed." The destruction then radiates outward. At one mile, Arlington National Cemetery and surrounding infrastructure are obliterated. At 2.5 miles, the clothes of 35,000 baseball fans at Nationals Park catch fire; they suffer third-degree burns, but MedStar Washington Hospital Center has only ten burn beds. One million people die within 90 seconds. The second stage begins when mega-fires ignite as gas lines rupture and chemical factories explode. Survivors shuffle through radioactive wasteland with ruptured lungs. No electricity, water, or first responders remain. Yet while the public remains unaware of these horrifying details, the United States government has rehearsed World War III scenarios for 65 years—conflicts that would kill over two billion people worldwide. To address this disconnect, Jacobsen takes readers back to a secret 1960 meeting at U.S. Strategic Command.

=== Part I - The buildup (or, how we got here) ===
December 1960: a secret, mass extermination plan

A classified meeting at U.S. Strategic Command headquarters at Offutt Air Force Base gathers Secretary of Defense Thomas S. Gates Jr., his deputy James H. Douglas Jr., Deputy Director of Defense Research and Engineering John H. Rubel, the Joint Chiefs of Staff—Commander of U.S. Strategic Air Command General Thomas S. Power, Army Chief General George Decker, Navy Chief Admiral Arleigh Burke, Air Force Commander General Thomas D. White, and Marine Corps Commandant General David M. Shoup—and numerous other top-ranking military officials. Its purpose, as documented in participant John Rubel's 2008 memoir, was to finalize a secret plan for waging nuclear war against the Soviet Union. This "mass extermination" plan would have resulted in 500 million deaths across the USSR, with B-52 bombers dropping 40 megatons of thermonuclear bombs on Moscow alone—equivalent to 4,000 Hiroshimas.

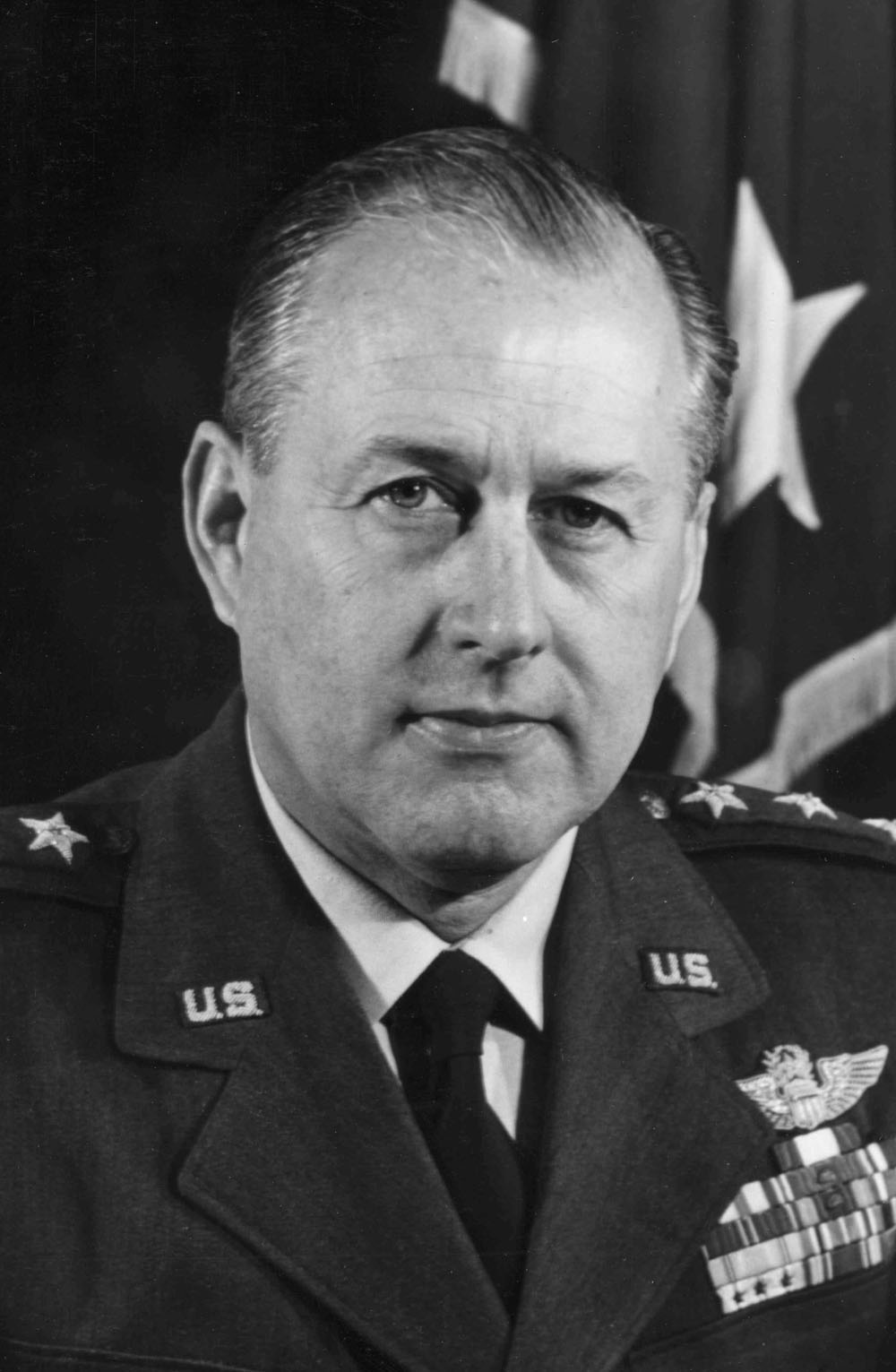
General Thomas S. Power, Commander of U.S. Strategic Air Command, who supported the 1960 nuclear war plan

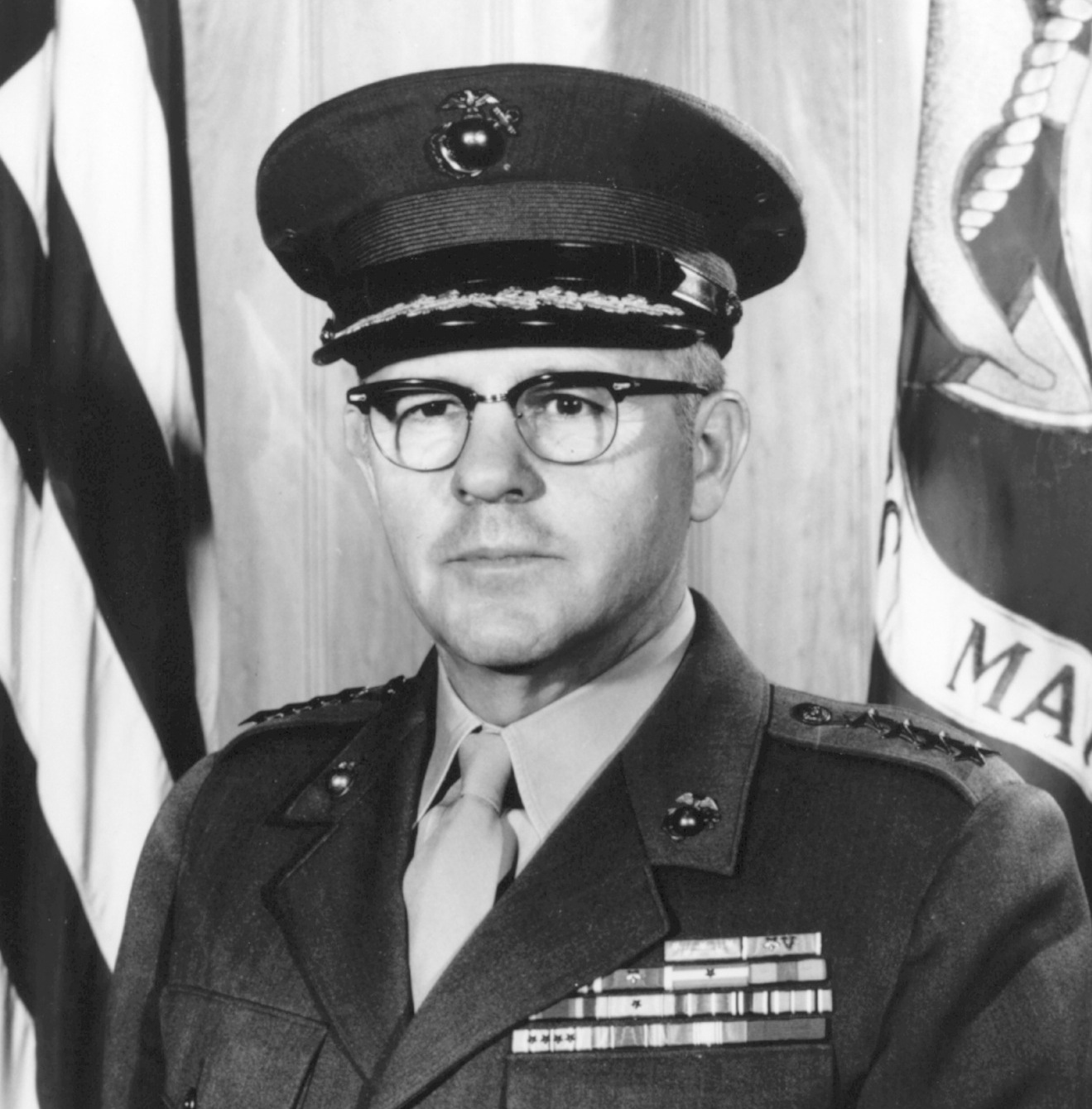
General David M. Shoup, Marine Corps Commandant, the only military leader to dissent from the mass extermination plan

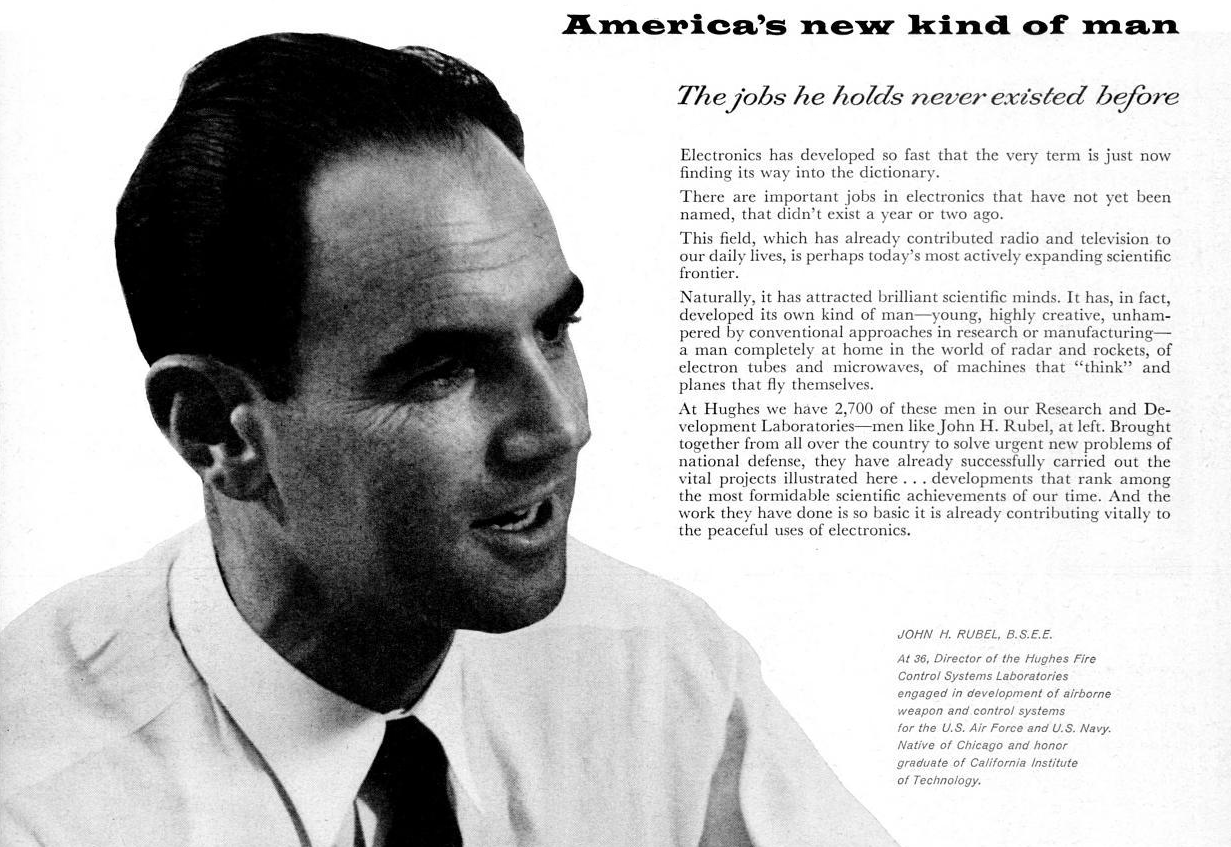
John H. Rubel, Deputy Director of Defense Research and Engineering, who documented the December 1960 meeting

August 6, 1945: two Hiroshima victims speak

To express the human meaning of this comparison, Jacobsen recounts the experiences of two survivors of the atomic bombing of Hiroshima, which instantly killed 80,000 people. Thirteen-year-old Setsuko Thurlow, who was 1.1 miles from ground zero when the 15-kiloton Little Boy bomb detonated 1,900 feet above the city, witnessed victims with missing skin and body parts, and Dr. Michihiko Hachiya, whose clothes were blown off, was left naked and bleeding. The U.S. military classified their stories, as well as those of countless other victims, as intellectual property to maintain strategic advantages in understanding nuclear weapons effects.

1946-1960: The buildup

Nuclear warhead stockpiles of the United States and the Soviet Union/Russia, 1945-2014

The December 1960 meeting at STRATCOM was a milestone in the nuclear arms race that had started after World War II. Los Alamos National Laboratory, which built the two bombs dropped on Japan, would have shut down had it not been for the Navy's 1946 Operation Crossroads. While the U.S. had only one atomic bomb left at war's end, by mid-1946 it possessed nine, growing to 170 by 1949—a number considered sufficient to destroy the Soviet Union. The arms race accelerated after the USSR detonated its first atomic bomb in 1949 using blueprints stolen by Klaus Fuchs. American production surged from 170 to 299 weapons by the end of 1950. The development of thermonuclear weapons marked another escalation: in 1952, the U.S. exploded the 10.4-megaton Ivy Mike test, the first "Super" bomb, which completely obliterated Elugelab island in the Pacific Ocean. Mass production accelerated further, reaching thirteen per day in 1959. By 1960, the U.S. had 18,638 nuclear bombs, 110 times more than the 170 warheads sufficient to obliterate the USSR. Why? One word was invoked to justify this buildup: deterrence.

December 1960: the birth of SIOP

Such mass production created complexities since each military branch operated independently with its own nuclear weapons, delivery systems, and target lists. The creation of the Single Integrated Operational Plan (SIOP) in December 1960 unified these into a coordinated strategy calling for a preemptive strike on the USSR. That such a plan would kill 275 million people in the first hour and an additional 325 million within six months—half of whom would not even be in the Soviet Union, including 300 million Chinese civilians—did not seem to bother the generals who met at STRATCOM. On the next day, they all thanked the officers who had worked on the plan—except Marine Corps Commandant David M. Shoup, who dissented, stating that "any plan that murders 300 million Chinese when it might not even be their war is not a good plan. That is not the American way." His objection was met with stunned silence. Decades later, Rubel compared the December 1960 meeting to the Nazi Wannsee Conference of January 1942, where the Final Solution was planned.

Present day: from SIOP to OPLAN

The SIOP evolved and changed its name to Operations Plan (OPLAN). The current one is OPLAN 8010-12, which consists of four plans directed against Russia, China, North Korea, and Iran. The United States stockpile of nuclear warheads went down from an all-time high of 31,255 in 1967 to about 5,000 nuclear weapons in 2024, with 1,770 ready for launch; Russia possesses similar numbers. Despite Ronald Reagan and Mikhail Gorbachev's 1985 joint declaration that "a nuclear war cannot be won and must never be fought," these mass extermination plans remain active.

=== Part II - The first 24 minutes ===
First minute: North Korea launches ICBM at US

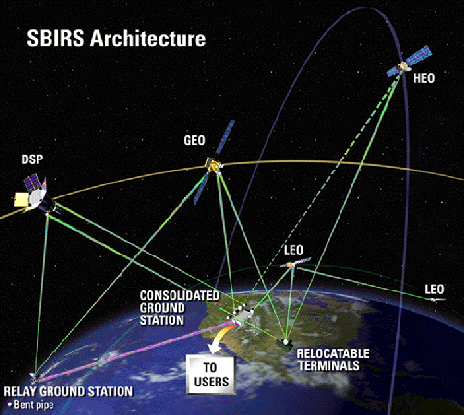
SBIRS (Space-Based Infrared System) satellite network architecture, which detects the North Korean ICBM launch within four-tenths of a second in Jacobsen's scenario

At 3:03 PM EDT on March 30, (Note: Jacobsen reveals the day of the attack on page 39, the time on page 33, but the year remains hypothetical, "possibly sometime in the near future" on page xvii.) a rocket fires in North Korea. Within four-tenths of a second, the U.S. Space-Based Infrared System (SBIRS) satellites detect the ignition and begin sending data streams to the Aerospace Data Facility of the National Reconnaissance Office in Colorado, where the dimension of the rocket's plume is analyzed. Within five seconds, NRO concludes North Korea has launched a Hwasong-17 ICBM with a 1-megaton thermonuclear warhead. Three command centers are immediately informed: the Pentagon's National Military Command Center, NORAD headquarters at Cheyenne Mountain Complex, and U.S. Strategic Command headquarters at Offutt Air Force Base.

The ICBM's trajectory proves alarming—it is not heading for space or the Sea of Japan as in previous North Korean tests. After fifteen seconds, Space Delta 4, the missile-warning unit at Buckley Space Force Base, concludes the ICBM is heading to the Continental United States. Fifteen seconds later, the worst fears are confirmed: the ICBM is heading toward the East coast. This development is puzzling: launching one ICBM makes no strategic sense, because a single nuclear warhead alone cannot decapitate the U.S., and the attacking country will itself be decapitated by the U.S. nuclear response. However, any U.S. retaliation requires a secondary confirmation, which will only be provided in eight minutes by the Long Range Discrimination Radar at Clear Space Force Station in Alaska.

1–4 minutes: President informed of nuclear attack

At STRATCOM, three critical countdown clocks begin: Red Impact (time to impact), Blue Impact (time for retaliation decision), and Safe Escape (time for leadership evacuation). The STRATCOM Commander focuses on getting the Blue Impact clock ticking. NORAD's commander informs the secretary of defense and the chairman of the Joint Chiefs of Staff of the attack. The secretary of defense has 30 seconds to prepare his words for the president, knowing that once secondary confirmation arrives, the Launch on Warning policy will kick in. He calls the president at the White House and delivers the devastating news: three minutes and 30 seconds earlier, North Korea launched a nuclear missile at the U.S. The president is confused by the unprecedented situation, as he is the only person in the chain of command who has not rehearsed what will happen next. He learns he has no more than six minutes to decide if and how the U.S. will retaliate. Suddenly, Secret Service agents burst into action, forcibly removing the president to the White House Situation Room for protection.

4–9 minutes: US missile defense fails completely

Four minutes and 15 seconds after launch, the boost phase of the North Korean ICBM is over: 500 miles above Earth, it enters its mid-course phase and, without a heat signature, becomes much harder to track. The Ground-Based Midcourse Defense system—interceptor missiles—despite having only 44 missiles with a 55% success rate, prepares to engage. The Sea-based X-band Radar in the North Pacific Ocean guides them as the first missile is launched, traveling at 20,000 miles per hour toward the ICBM and its five decoys. When the first interceptor fails to destroy the ICBM, three additional missiles are launched in rapid succession, but all fail. Simultaneously, the Long Range Discrimination Radar provides secondary confirmation of the incoming threat. The moment of decision has arrived: the president must now implement Launch on Warning.

10–12 minutes: President wrestles with retaliation decision

The president is moved to the Presidential Emergency Operations Center, a more hardened facility than the command center beneath the West Wing. The military aide—who stays within arm's length of the president 24/7/365—opens the "Football"—the nuclear briefcase containing the "Black Book" with America's nuclear retaliation options. The president, overwhelmed by the situation, asks the chairman of the Joint Chiefs, "Tell me what to do", but the chairman can only advise. The nuclear options before the president draw from the United States nuclear triad: 400 land-based ICBMs, 66 strategic bombers, and 14 nuclear submarines. Military leaders "jam" the president to authorize immediate retaliation while the secretary of defense advocates for restraint, urging communication with Moscow and Beijing to prevent global escalation. After the president orders all U.S. forces to move to DEFCON 1, he focuses his attention on the Black Book's option Charlie, as advised by the chairman. He learns it would wipe out North Korea, kill up to four million Chinese, and put at risk the 28,500 U.S. troops stationed in South Korea. He hesitates. He questions. Pressed by time and pressured by the military, he reaches for the "Biscuit"—the card containing the nuclear launch "gold codes"—when suddenly ten armed Secret Service agents from the CAT team on the president's detail enter and forcibly remove him from the room, prioritizing his safety over his nuclear authority.

12–15 minutes: US prepares retaliation

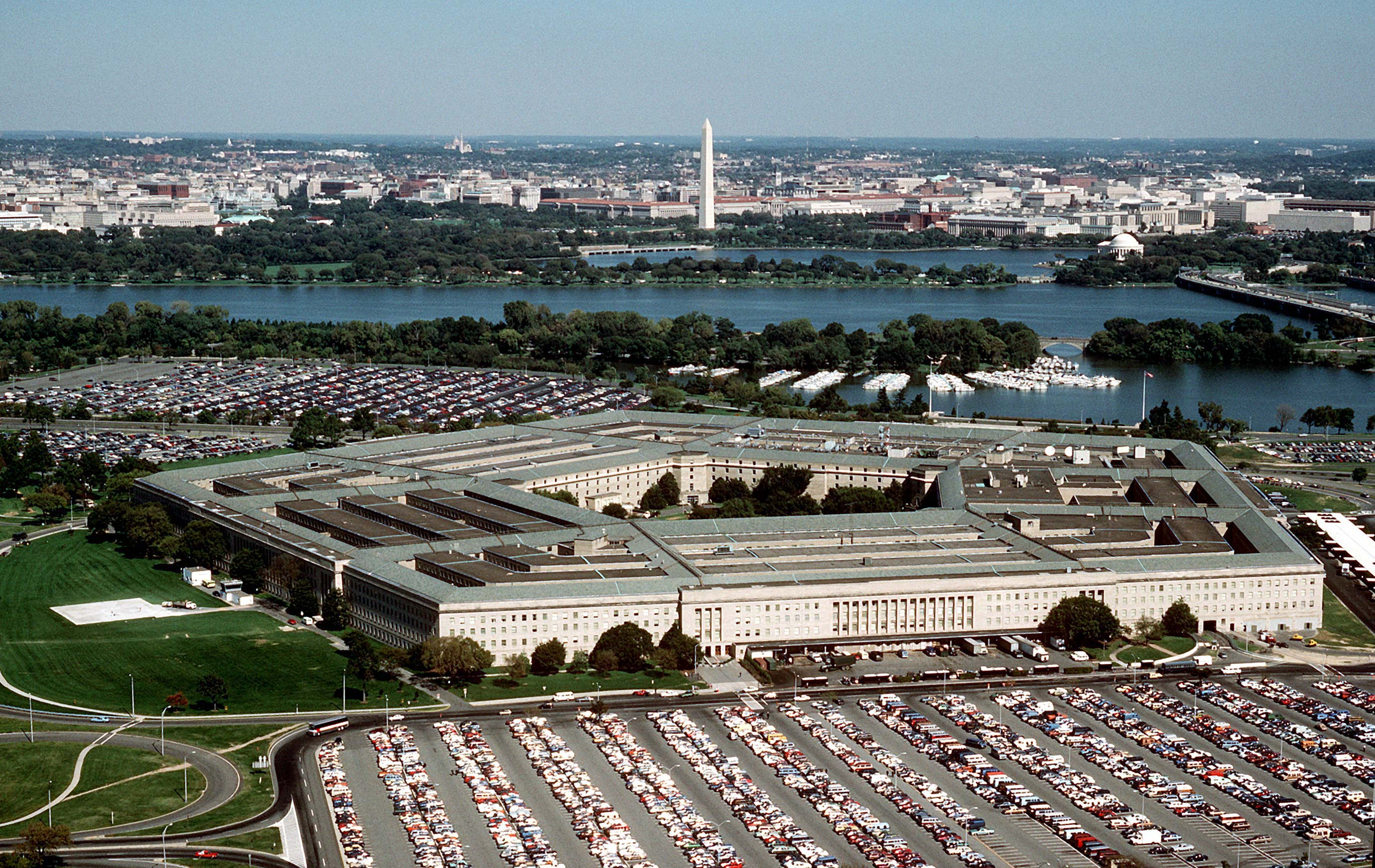
The Pentagon, target of the first North Korean ICBM in Jacobsen's scenario

At Andersen Air Force Base in Guam, two stealth B-2 bombers begin preparations for takeoff, loaded with B61-12 thermonuclear gravity bombs—the one decision the president managed to make before being whisked away by the CAT team. Meanwhile, FEMA's chief is helicoptered to safety to implement continuity of operations plans, focusing on government survival rather than civilian protection. Now understanding that Washington D.C. is the target and the whole cabinet is about to be decapitated, the secretary of defense, sixth in the presidential line of succession, and the vice-chairman of the Joint Chiefs evacuate via Osprey to the secure Raven Rock bunker.

16–18 minutes: Second North Korean missile detected

The STRATCOM Commander, frustrated that the CAT Team whisked the president away before he could provide the launch codes, receives devastating news: SBIRS satellites detect a second nuclear warhead, this time a submarine-launched ballistic missile (SLBM) 350 miles off California. Two missiles confirm this is no accident: deterrence has failed, and America is under a coordinated nuclear attack. Despite the escalating crisis, the president still has not provided nuclear launch codes, as he is moved by Secret Service aboard Marine One.

19–24 minutes: Diablo Canyon struck, US retaliates

Minuteman III launch from Vandenberg Space Force Base, California, United States of America on 9 February 2023.

The second missile's target becomes clear: it will strike the Diablo Canyon Power Plant in California in three minutes. The plant operates two 1,000+ megawatt water reactors and could have been protected by AEGIS or THAAD interceptors, but both systems have been deployed overseas. The North Korean KN23 missile detonates directly over the facility, creating both a nuclear fireball and triggering a catastrophic meltdown of the reactor cores. Meanwhile, ground-based radar at Cavalier Space Force Station in North Dakota provides final confirmation of the original ICBM's target: either the White House or the Pentagon. Finally, the president—now airborne in Marine One and having learned of the Diablo Canyon strike—authorizes a massive nuclear counterstrike against 82 North Korean targets with fifty Minuteman III ICBMs from a Missile Alert Facility in Wyoming and eight Trident SLBMs, each carrying four nuclear warheads. A Russian spy stationed down the road immediately calls Moscow to report that American ICBMs have been launched.

=== Part III - The next 24 minutes ===
24–26 minutes: California is nuked

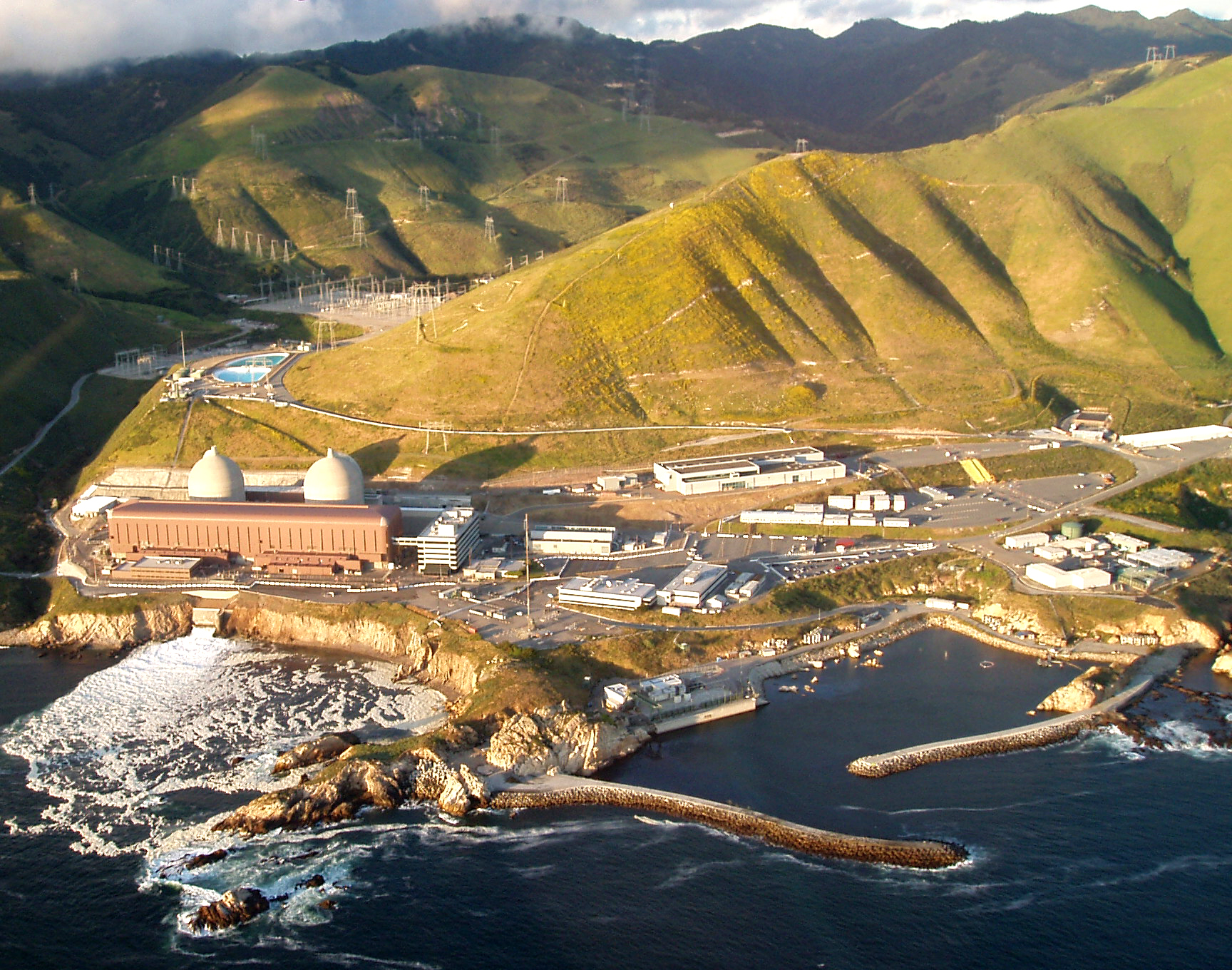
Diablo Canyon Nuclear Power Plant, struck by a North Korean submarine-launched missile in the scenario

A rancher near Diablo Canyon Power Plant films the 300-kiloton mushroom cloud rising from the devastated facility. Within a minute, the unprecedented volume of posts overwhelms social media platforms—X crashes permanently and never returns online. The bomb not only destroys the two 1,100-megawatt reactors but also shatters 2,000 tons of spent nuclear fuel, sending radioactive debris into the atmosphere. The contamination spreads across a vast area from California to Nevada, creating an uninhabitable zone of unprecedented scale.

26–27 minutes: Russia is triggered

The nuclear crisis takes on a global dimension as two pieces of news propagate simultaneously in Russia. Night watch personnel at the National Defense Management Center in Moscow monitor social media streams and immediately inform Russian military leadership about the nuclear strikes on the California nuclear power plant. Simultaneously, Russia's Tundra early warning satellites detect the U.S. Minuteman III ICBMs launched in retaliation against North Korea. However, Tundra has a history of mistaking cloud formations for incoming ICBMs.

27–32 minutes: Critical decisions under pressure

Pressures mount on three fronts:

1. On the strategic front - The president, aboard Marine One attempting to escape the forthcoming nuclear explosion, is under mounting pressure from the STRATCOM Commander. He finally yields by authorizing the "universal unlock code," a fail-safe mechanism that allows the STRATCOM Commander to launch nuclear weapons independently if the president is killed or becomes incapacitated.
2. On the diplomatic front - The secretary of defense, flying in an Osprey toward Raven Rock, must establish communication with Moscow to inform them that the American ICBMs that were just fired will traverse Russian airspace but are intended to strike North Korea. This is because the Minutemen ICBMs lack sufficient range to fly directly to North Korea.
3. On the military front - All military personnel at the Pentagon's National Military Command Center wait through the final critical 120 seconds of the North Korean ICBM's flight path toward Washington, D.C., hoping, however faintly, that the missile could still fail before reaching its target. Meanwhile, intelligence assessments reveal the broader threat posed by North Korea's arsenal: the regime possesses 50 nuclear weapons plus 5,000 tons of chemical weapons. While THAAD missile defense systems protect South Korea, they would be overwhelmed if North Korea were to launch hundreds of missiles simultaneously.

32 minutes, 30 seconds: Washington is nuked

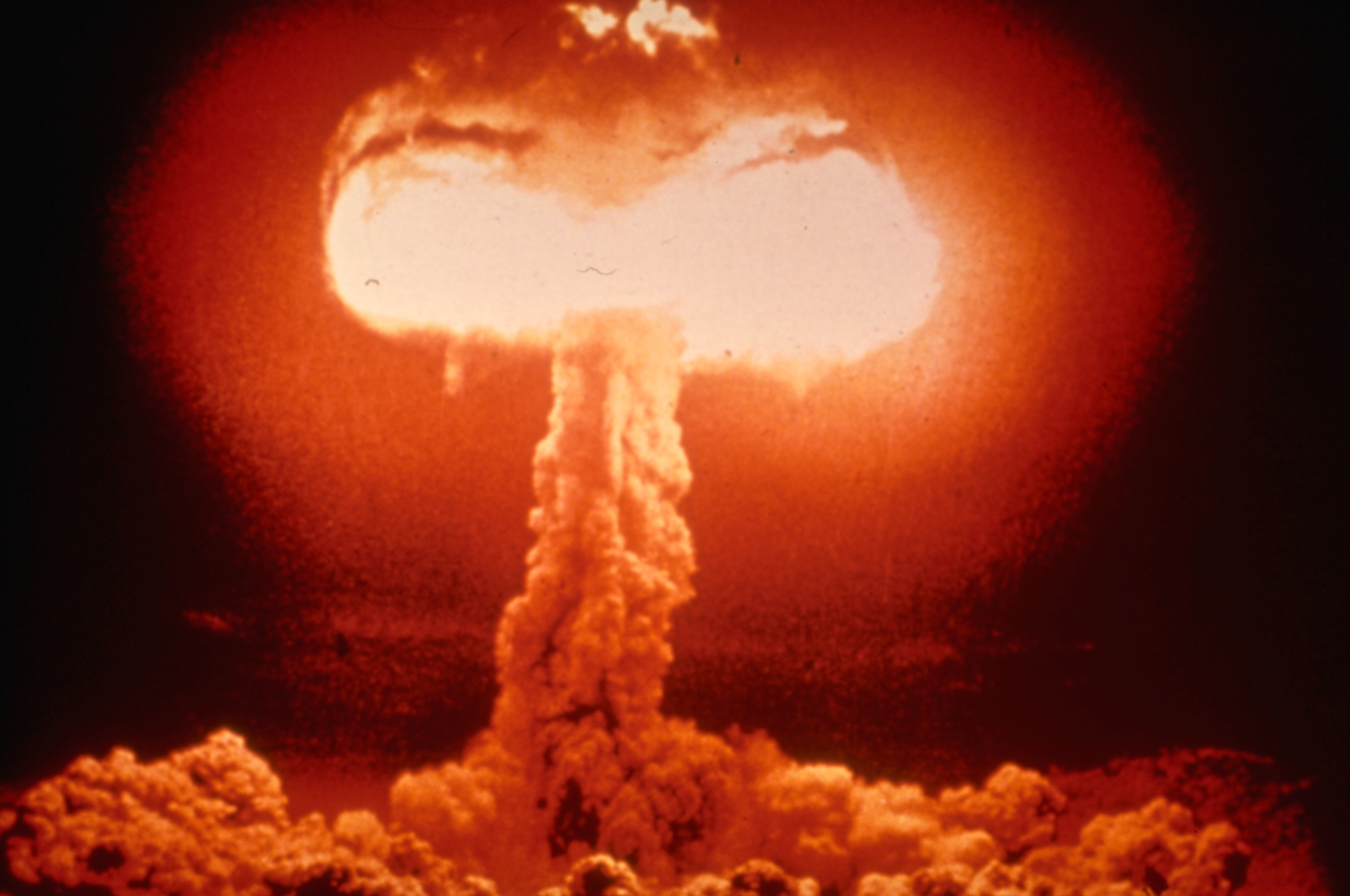
Nuclear mushroom cloud from a test detonation, similar to what would be seen over Washington D.C.

Recognizing that Marine One remains too close to the anticipated blast zone and that its electronics would be fried by the electromagnetic pulse from the nuclear detonation over Washington, the president and the military aide carrying the Football make a desperate tandem parachute jump with the Secret Service Counter Assault Team. Thirty seconds later, the one-megaton thermonuclear weapon detonates above the Pentagon. The blast generates temperatures of 180 million degrees Fahrenheit and creates a pressure wave that destroys everything within a three-mile radius. Within Ring 1—a nine-mile diameter circle—fires ignite, buildings collapse, and materials melt. Between one and two million people die within the first ten seconds.

33 minutes: Russia misinterprets satellite data

Tundra satellites stream their data to Serpukhov-15, Russia's western command center for incoming ICBM launch data. In stark contrast to Colonel Stanislav Petrov who in 1983 classified as a false alarm the incoming satellite warnings of five American ICBMs, the current Russian commander at Serpukhov-15 trusts the faulty reports from Tundra indicating hundreds of American ICBMs fired at Russia and immediately reports the threat to Moscow.

34–36 minutes: Nuclear devastation spreads

In California, tens of thousands of people attempt to evacuate the Diablo Canyon area simultaneously, creating deadly traffic jams as people flee the radioactive zone. On the East Coast, CNN's news anchors report unconfirmed nuclear strikes on California and Washington, D.C. and broadcast FEMA's emergency warning: "US UNDER NUCLEAR ATTACK. SEEK IMMEDIATE SHELTER. THIS IS NOT A DRILL." The STRATCOM Commander aboard the Doomsday Plane over Nebraska watches live satellite imagery of Washington D.C.'s devastation while awaiting word from the president and vice president. Ring 1 is completely devastated—100% fatality and total obliteration. Ring 2, extending to a 15-mile diameter, experiences energy release 15 to 50 times greater than that of the nuclear weapon itself, with 300-mile-per-hour winds sucking everything upward into the firestorm.

36–38 minutes: US fires SLBMs

USS Wyoming fires a Trident SLBM, similar to the USS Nebraska's missile launch described in the scenario

In an undisclosed location, in the middle of the Pacific Ocean, the 155 submariners of the USS Nebraska are intensely focused on preparing to unleash more destructive power than all of the bombs dropped during World War II. After the first Trident SLBM is fired, another seven follow at fifteen-second intervals. Each missile carries four 455-kiloton nuclear warheads, which will reach North Korea in 14 minutes. Defensively, military installations worldwide implement FPCON Delta measures—the highest threat level— the FAA issues SCATANA orders to ground all civilian aircraft, and U.S. borders close completely as the nation prepares for a potential broader conflict.

38–39 minutes: US-Russia communication falls apart

The secretary of defense, temporarily blinded by the nuclear flash, loses all communication with the president. With the vice president and the four cabinet members before him in the line of presidential succession presumed dead, he could be sworn in as president. But a more strategic issue is now pressing: Russia. The vice chairman of the Joint Chiefs of Staff finally manages to contact his Russian counterpart and informs him that America has been attacked. The Russian general's response is ominous: "Your president should have called us by now," before hanging up abruptly. At NATO headquarters in Brussels, Article 5 of the North Atlantic Treaty is invoked. The United States maintains 100 nuclear weapons at six NATO bases across Belgium, the Netherlands, Germany, Italy (two bases), and Turkey. However, launch orders must come directly from the American president, so NATO forces wait for authorization that may never come. Simultaneously, Russia observes NATO bases preparing for potential nuclear airstrikes and activates the Kazbek nuclear command system. Russian forces prepare their arsenal and await the Russian president's orders.

40 minutes, 30 seconds: North Korea fires a second ICBM

The U.S. has fired a total of 82 nuclear weapons at North Korea to "restore deterrence"—a brutal retaliation that will kill millions of civilians in clear violation of international war protocols, but deemed necessary to decapitate an opaque regime. Before being hit by this assault, North Korea launches a second Hwasong-17 ICBM from an underground facility at Hoejung-ni. SBIRS satellites detect the launch immediately, which analysts believe is likely aimed at either Cheyenne Mountain or Offutt Air Force Base. Civil society is in despair as media relay contradictory emergency advice from FEMA. In Diablo Canyon, complete panic ensues as power grids fail, cellular networks collapse, emergency sirens wail, mega-fires rage, concrete debris and dead seagulls fall from the contaminated sky, and people vomit uncontrollably.

41 minutes: Russia overestimates incoming US SLBMs

High above the Pacific Ocean, the eight Trident missiles travel at 13,600 miles per hour toward Pyongyang and deploy hundreds of decoy warheads. Tundra satellites misperceive these as additional incoming SLBMs. Russian radar operators at the Komsomolsk command center report this "new barrage" of nuclear weapons approaching from the south, further escalating Russian fears of a coordinated American first strike.

41–42 minutes: US chain of command disrupted

Aboard the American Doomsday Plane, a grim discovery unfolds: the military aide carrying the Football is found dead, and there's no sign of the president. The chairman of the Joint Chiefs of Staff is confirmed dead in the Pentagon strike. The vice-chairman wants the secretary of defense sworn in as acting president, while STRATCOM demands immediate authorization to counter the incoming second North Korean ICBM. Miraculously, the president survived the parachute jump despite being hit by the shockwave but suffers severe injuries including a fractured arm and a fractured leg. Stranded near Little Seneca Lake in Maryland with no communication, he depends entirely on quick reaction forces to locate him before he bleeds out, but they never do. Thirty miles southeast, the Potomac is clogged with blinded animals that escaped the National Zoo and humans who jumped in out of despair.

43–45 minutes: Russia launches massive counterstrike

In his underground bunker in Siberia, the Russian president has six minutes to make a decision that will determine the fate of civilization. Feeling insulted that the American president never called to explain the situation, and convinced by his paranoid advisors that the United States is attempting to decapitate Russian leadership, he orders a massive counterstrike with "the mother lode." Russia launches its most devastating weapons: 312 RS-28 Sarmat intercontinental ballistic missiles, each loaded with up to ten 500-kiloton warheads. The total arsenal of 1,090 nuclear warheads is fired simultaneously at targets across the United States. Within seconds of the Russian launch, the Aerospace Data Facility in Colorado detects the massive ICBM barrage. The United States faces complete defenselessness against such a large scale attack. Cheyenne Mountain Complex, Offutt Air Force Base, and Site R will soon be wiped out. However, before these command centers are destroyed, American forces prepare their own "mother lode" counterstrike.

=== Part IV - The next (and final) 24 minutes ===
48 minutes: US leadership collapses

At Site R, the secretary of defense is sworn in as acting president following the assumed deaths of the president, the vice president and the next five officials in the presidential line of succession. Meanwhile, the STRATCOM Commander aboard the Doomsday Plane awaits launch orders with just six minutes remaining to make the most consequential decision in human history.

48 minutes, 10 seconds: Russia fires 192 SLBMs at the US

The Russian response proves devastating and immediate. From the Arctic Ocean, two K-114 Tula submarines and one Borei-class submarine launch 192 100-kiloton nuclear warheads at the United States in just 80 seconds, firing at five-second intervals. Simultaneously, two additional Russian submarines in the Atlantic Ocean target NATO installations across Europe.

49 to 51 minutes: US fires its entire nuclear arsenal at Russia

After all the deterrence theories have completely failed, with only five minutes remaining, the STRATCOM Commander, now in possession of the universal launch codes authorized earlier by the former president, is ready to launch America's entire remaining nuclear arsenal. This is the final opportunity to "use them or lose them" since all U.S. silo-based ICBMs and command centers will soon be obliterated by incoming Russian weapons. However, the secretary of defense, recently sworn in as acting president despite knowing that they only have minutes to live, is constitutionally deciding on retaliation. He experiences a profound crisis of conscience, questioning why hundreds of millions of innocent people must die. Ultimately, he relents and orders the most extreme nuclear option: targeting 975 sites across Russia. The STRATCOM Commander relays an order he would have given regardless. The retaliation involves 350 ICBMs, B-52 bombers, and 10 submarines at sea, all coordinated to annihilate Russia. Across NATO airbases, pilots race to their aircraft for what they know are suicide missions. The flight plan calls for jets to fly 200 feet above ground to avoid radar detection, drop their nuclear payloads, and crash when they run out of fuel.

52–55 minutes: North Korea unleashes an electrical Armageddon on the US

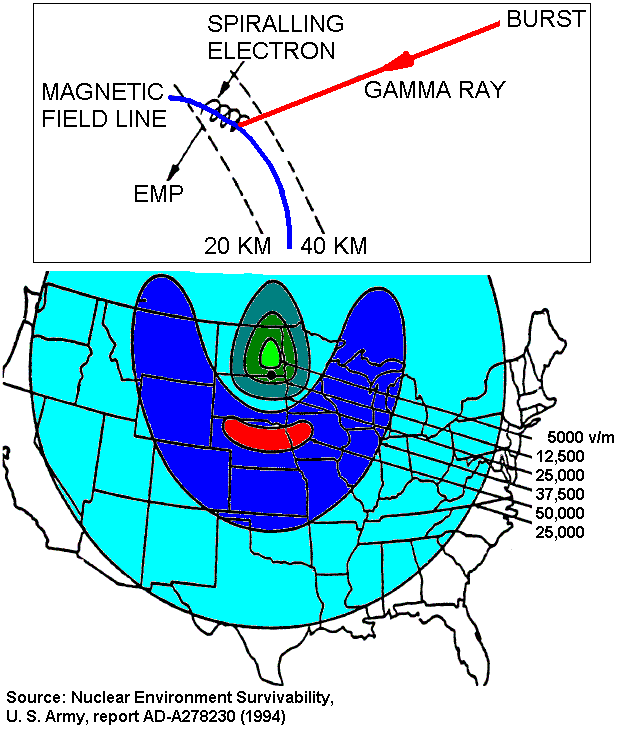
EMP mechanism showing the electromagnetic pulse effects that devastate U.S. electrical infrastructure in Jacobsen's scenario

The American Trident SLBM warheads reach their targets first. Twelve W88 455-kiloton warheads detonate over Pyongyang's three million residents, twenty destroy North Korea's nuclear facilities while fifty additional ICBMs follow, creating a complete holocaust across the Korean peninsula. Meanwhile, the North Korean leader retreats to a bunker 1,900 feet underground, preparing two final assaults. The first is to cover South Korea with 10,000 artillery shells and 240mm rockets loaded with chemical agents target Osan Air Base, Camp Humphreys, and Seoul. The THAAD missile defense systems are quickly overwhelmed and fail completely. Up to 2.5 million people die from the chemical weapons attack. The second attack is also revenge. Having been ridiculed years ago by a photo published in Western media showing the Korean peninsula at night, the South beaming in light, the North plunged in darkness, North Korea's leader is now ready to send the U.S. back to its own dark ages by unleashing an electromagnetic pulse (EMP) over its territory. For decades, the U.S. EMP Commission warned about the dangers of nuclear electromagnetic pulse attacks. In 2017, it deemed North Korea's "nuclear EMP attack" an "existential threat" to American civilization. Despite these warnings, nothing was done to prepare. Therefore, the U.S. Space Command at Redstone Arsenal in Alabama can only watch as a North Korean Super-EMP satellite maneuvers into position 300 miles above the United States and detonates. The electromagnetic pulse creates three cascading shockwaves that surge through SCADA systems controlling America's entire electrical infrastructure. Cars, airplanes, dams, valves, and countless other electronic systems simultaneously fail. The United States, the world's most technologically advanced nation, is brought to its knees by this single space-based explosion.

57–59 minutes: Russia destroys the US

The massive barrage of Russian warheads obliterates every military installation across the United States. Site R's destruction touches off a massive firestorm that kills and carbonizes the actual president, who was still stranded near Seneca Lake. Only the Doomsday Plane and scattered Trident submarines at sea remain operational. The same Russian barrage simultaneously destroys NATO bases across Belgium, Germany, the Netherlands, Italy, and Turkey, but extends beyond the alliance to include the United Kingdom, France, and other European nations. The nuclear exchange has become truly global. The last of the E6-B Doomsday Fleet, deploys its five-mile long antennae and uses its AN/FRC-117 low-frequency radio system to transmit humanity's final nuclear launch orders to the surviving Trident submarines. (Note: The AN/FRC-117 Survivable Low Frequency Communications System described by Jacobsen was decommissioned in 2010, making this detail technically inaccurate for a contemporary scenario.) The last submarine-launched ballistic missiles fire from the depths of the ocean. As Jacobsen notes: "Everyone loses. Everyone."

1 hour 12 minutes: nuclear apocalypse

After the 192 Russian SLBMs and two North Korean nuclear weapons (a third failed to detonate) hit the US, another 1,000 Russian warheads strike it over 22 minutes, completing the nuclear apocalypse: 1,000 mile-wide fireballs are followed by 1,000 walls of compressed air that bulldoze to dust 1,000 U.S. cities, before 1,000 100 square mile-large mega-fires reduce to ash the rest of the country. Hundreds of millions of people die in North America and Europe. The first atomic bomb exploded on July 16, 1945 at the Alamogordo Bombing Range, at a site named Jornada del Muerto, The Journey of the Dead Man. Nikita Khrushchev ominously described the end of this nuclear journey as the time when "the survivors will envy the dead."

=== Part V - The next 24 months and beyond (or, where we are headed after a nuclear exchange) ===
The nuclear conflict creates 1,000 rings of fire, each with a radius of 100 to 200 miles, that inject 150 million metric tons of soot into the troposphere. This reduces the Sun's warming rays by 80% and causes a global temperature drop of 27 °F (15 °C) on average, triggering a 45% fall in rainfall and a nuclear winter lasting 15 years.

As a result, agriculture collapses, and major breadbaskets like South Dakota and Ukraine freeze year-round. This leads to widespread famine for mankind, with survival only being possible in Southern Hemisphere countries like Australia, New Zealand, Chile, Argentina and Brazil. The conflict also causes radiation poisoning from nuclear fallout.

When the nuclear winter finally ends, the ozone layer, which has been heavily damaged by the war, has lost up to 65% of its shielding power. This leaves life on Earth largely unprotected from the Sun's ultraviolet rays, forcing humanity to live in underground shelters while diseases and insects from thawing corpses spread aboveground. Like the Chicxulub asteroid event 66 million years ago, the nuclear winter would likely kill off large-bodied animals, while tiny-bodied species like insects or rodents surviving.

It is not made clear what happens to the human race after 24,000 years, but the question raised is, what traces of humanity could our descendants, if any, find? Will they wonder, as we do today about Göbekli Tepe, what catastrophe fell upon us? With all our knowledge gone, will future myths keep a memory that the enemy was not "another" nation but nuclear weapons?

=== History Lessons ===
The book features nine short historical vignettes focusing on deterrence, the ICBM, launch on warning, ICBM launch systems, the president's football, nuclear-armed submarines, the Proud Prophet war game, radiation sickness and "Apes on a Treadmill."

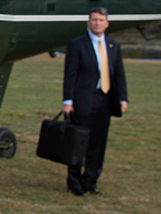
President Obama's military aide carrying the nuclear football, illustrating the presidential authorization system whose origins are detailed in the book

In the 'history lesson' on the president's football, Jacobsen claims the Los Alamos National Laboratory declassified its origin story for her book. She accessed a paper on the subject written by Harold Agnew and Glen McDuff, whom she also interviewed. In December 1959, Agnew visited a NATO base in Europe with officials from the Joint Committee on Atomic Energy. Observing MK 7 gravity bombs mounted on Republic F-84F jets, he was alarmed to find them guarded by "this single G.I. surrounded by a large number of foreign troops on foreign territory with thousands of Soviet troops just miles away." Concerned that anyone could arm the bomb, Agnew asked Don Cotter of Sandia Laboratories to develop an electronic “lock” on its firing circuit. The prototype gained support from nearly all military officials, except General Alfred Starbird, who doubted the practicality of a pilot obtaining an unlock code from the U.S. president. Further the U.S. military started questioning why MK 7s should be treated differently from other nuclear weapons. President Kennedy used the introduction of the first Single Integrated Operational Plan to mandate that all nuclear weapons must require presidential authorization. This led to the development of the emergency satchel—later known as the president’s football- and of the Permissive Action Links.

== Themes and style ==
=== Central themes ===
The nuclear arsenal is a Sword of Damocles

The overarching message frames nuclear weapons themselves as a catastrophe waiting to happen, arguing that the continued existence of nuclear arsenals makes eventual use statistically inevitable. As she concludes her book: "the enemy was not North Korea, Russia, America, China, Iran, or anyone else vilified as a nation or a group. It was the nuclear weapons that were the enemy of us all. All along."

Nuclear escalation is unavoidable

A central thesis throughout the work draws from the conclusion of the 1983 Proud Prophet war game: "there is no way to win a nuclear war once it starts. There is no such thing as de-escalation." The scenario could only end in an apocalypse because all such scenarios end in this way. "We learned [from Proud Prophet] that no matter how nuclear war starts, [...] it ends in Armageddon. We now know from the Proud Prophet war game what happens if [deterrence] doesn't hold." Reviewers have noted that the catastrophic escalation depicted in the book stems from specific policy choices, including a) sole presidential launch authority, b) launch-on-warning doctrine, c) reliance on land-based ICBMs in fixed silos that are vulnerable to preemptive strikes, creating "use them or lose them" pressure for rapid decision-making, and d) the principle of restoring deterrence.

=== Style ===
Fact-based

Jacobsen wanted every aspect of her scenario to be grounded in facts. The nine historical vignettes inserted throughout the book and the 610 historical notes that form the 40-page-long Notes section at the end of it give the source for each fact and sometimes shed additional light on their discovery. For instance, she found the time it takes for an ICBM to fly from Russia to the United States (26 minutes and 40 seconds) by reading the personal archives of Herbert York stored at the Geisel Library of UC San Diego. Interviewed during her book tour, she revealed that this serendipitous find came after she had unsuccessfully tried to get an official statement of that travel time from the U.S. Army.

Fast-paced

The book is structured in "three acts, good old Shakespeare, [...] three 24-minute acts because that is how long it takes for a nuclear war to unfold." She states that this timing "is not like my imagination, that comes from a direct quote from [...] former STRATCOM commander General Kehler, who told her that an exchange between Russia and America could mean "the world could end in the next couple of hours."

Dramatic realism

Academic reviewers have noted Jacobsen's distinctive approach of blending factual research with narrative storytelling to create what Simon A. Bennett described as "a narrative that is informative and gripping." The book integrates psychological elements, depicting the human pressures on decision-makers during nuclear crisis alongside the technical and procedural details.

She was inspired to trigger the scenario with a "Bolt Out Of the Blue" attack following her interview of Richard Garwin, who thought this was "the most dangerous scenario [one] could think of, [that of] one nihilistic madman with a nuclear arsenal." She strongly believes he was referring to Kim Jong Un, whose "recklessness" is demonstrated by the fact that "his country is the only one of the nine nuclear-armed nations that does not announce any of its nuclear missile tests." Jacobsen then makes the U.S. retaliate with 82 missiles in response to North Korea's two ICBMs on Washington, D.C., and the Diablo Canyon nuclear power plant by applying the U.S. policies of "Escalate to De-escalate" and "Damage Limitation Requirement [by which POTUS] has to make sure that he is limiting potential future damage to the United States." Bennett contextualized the scenario within North Korea's ongoing nuclear weapons development, noting projections that the country could possess 300 warheads by 2035, potentially exceeding the UK's 225. Bruce Blair, missile launch officer and "America's [...] grandfather of nuclear command and control policies," described in a monograph how the US "sub[marine] force would be capable of quickly firing about 200 warheads [to North Korea] roughly 15 minutes after the president gave the order."

Non-political

As with all her previous works, the book is non-political. All the actors of the scenario are mentioned by their functions, such as POTUS, Sec Def, STRATCOM Commander, the president of Russia, or the leader of North Korea. Similarly, she does not explain the political motivations behind North Korea's strike. Jacobsen chose this approach because she is more interested in the long-term goal of having a wide spectrum of readers, from peace activists to officials in the Pentagon, and thus generating wise, interesting, and complex conversations. Ultimately, no one should be for nuclear war.

== Sources ==
Jacobsen accessed archives and declassified documents of various US government and military institutions (e.g. the US Department of Defense, the National Intelligence, the National Archives and Records Administration, the Government Accountability Office, FEMA, the Los Alamos National Laboratory, NASA, the U.S. Navy, the White House, the U.S. Strategic Command), scientific bodies (e.g. the Federation of American Scientists, NOAA) and private companies (e.g. Lockheed Martin, Raytheon).

She interviewed 47 primary sources, focusing extensively on the most knowledgeable experts in nuclear policy and military strategy. Her most frequently consulted sources (Note: Based on a count of the number of times a person is mentioned in the Notes as having been interviewed.) included Ted Postol, former secretary of defense William Perry, Los Alamos historian Glen McDuff, and nuclear physicist Richard Garwin. Other key contributors included former secretary of defense Leon Panetta, STRATCOM Commander Robert Kehler, FEMA Director Craig Fugate, Director of U.S. Secret Service Lew Merletti, atmospheric scientist Brian Toon, nuclear policy experts Peter Pry, Hans Kristensen, and Pavel Podvig. As Jacobsen noted: "I wanted readers to know how deeply sourced this book was. [...] I wanted people to realize that although I was writing a scenario, I have learned through these interviews what would happen if deterrence failed."

During the book's development, ten sources passed away and are acknowledged in the book's dedication, including Alfred O'Donnell ("The Triggerman"), Nobel Prize winner Charles H. Townes, Marvin L. “Murph” Goldberger founder of JASON and sensor technology expert, Dr. Jay W. Forrester, who schooled Jacobsen on the meaning and consequences of system-of-systems, and DARPA's Paul S. Kozemchak, who initially planted the seed for the book concept.

Various drafts of the book were read by Glen McDuff, Ted Postol, Jon Wolfsthal, Lt. Gen. Charles Moore and Hans Kristensen. Before publishing Jacobsen asked for feedback from generals whom she had not interviewed. She wanted to know if her scenario could be seen as fear mongering: none of them said it was and one even replied with one word: "Terrifying!". She also received specific military feedback. For instance, her original scenario envisaged two interceptors missiles being fired at the incoming ballistic missile; the printed edition has four after a general commented that because interceptor missiles do not have the time to operate per the "shoot, look, shoot" targeting model, they have to be fired in rapid succession.

== Reception ==
The book debuted on the New York Times Best Seller list for combined print and e-book nonfiction at Nr. 9 on April 14, 2024 and spent twelve weeks in the top 15 peaking at Nr. 4 on April 21. In the Amazon.com "Best Non Fiction Books of 2024", it placed Nr. 4 overall in the United States. The book was shortlisted for the 2024 Baillie Gifford Prize for Non-fiction and the 2025 Dayton Literary Peace Prize for non-fiction.

=== Critical reception ===
Barry Gewen, writing in The New York Times, praised Jacobsen for her thorough research, stating that ”she has done her homework." He noted that she "has spent more than a decade interviewing dozens of experts while mastering the voluminous literature on the subject, some of it declassified only in recent years." However, he questioned the book's lack of a clear stance on nuclear disarmament, asking: "If she favors abolishing nuclear weapons altogether, she owes it to her readers to say so, and then explain how it could be done. How do we get from here to there?"

A review in The Economist acknowledged that while the scenario is speculative, Jacobsen's narrative serves a valuable purpose: to remind readers of the "world changing impact of nuclear weapons."

At once methodical and vivid, technically grounded and at times lurid [Nuclear War: A Scenario] conveys the reality of nuclear war in sometimes stomach-churning detail.

— The Economist

In The Guardian, Julian Borger described the book as “a terrifying story told in a devastatingly straightforward way,” noting that Jacobsen’s account “offers a relentless, almost clinical, progression of decisions and consequences.” He praised the book for avoiding melodrama while still conveying the horror of nuclear conflict, and observed that Jacobsen “lets the scenario unfold almost in real time, forcing the reader to absorb its inevitability.” Referring to the year's presidential election, she added "You would want to have a commander-in-chief who is of sound mind, who is fully in control of his mental capacity, who is not volatile, who is not subject to anger. These are significant character qualities that should be thought about when people vote for president, for the simple reason that the president has sole authority to launch nuclear weapons."

Arthur Herman, writing in The Wall Street Journal, described the book as “terrifying,” and commended its ability to convey the speed and scale of nuclear escalation. He noted that Jacobsen “has taken on the unthinkable and made it all too real,” and praised the book for its narrative clarity, though he suggested it offers more warning than policy guidance.

In Mother Jones, Michael Mechanic noted that Jacobsen's scenario demonstrates how launch on warning policies and nuclear escalation dynamics could lead to near-total human extinction.

Kirkus Reviews called the book "an urgent warning guaranteed to cause nightmares," describing it as "a scarifying, play-by-play exercise in gaming an apocalyptic war." The review noted that Jacobsen's scenario "updates Jonathan Schell's groundbreaking (and better written) 1982 book The Fate of the Earth," and concluded by highlighting the book's depiction of "the very rapid collapse of civilization and the erasure of all our technologies."

The Los Angeles Times praised Jacobsen's use of "startling facts most citizens outside the military-industrial complex aren't privy to," noting her "vivid second-by-second descriptions of the catastrophic effects that intercontinental ballistic missiles would have if they struck targets." In a sense, the book empowers readers by giving them "information that perhaps the government wishes [they] didn’t have"

NPR highlighted the book's inclusion in their "Books We Love" list, with a reviewer noting that "Jacobsen's writing in this scenario has the suspense of a great political thriller."

Interviewing Jacobsen, Kathy Gilsinan of Politico wrote that "Nuclear war would be bad. Everyone knows this. Most people would probably rather not think through the specifics. But Annie Jacobsen, an author of seven books on sensitive national security topics, wants you to know exactly how bad it would be."

Steven Poole of The Telegraph praised the book for its factual basis and research, but criticized the prose as being "overblown," remarking that "In terms of style, Nuclear War appears to have been written for those who find the novels of Dan Brown too sophisticated. Pulp-thrillerish one-sentence paragraphs abound." However, he concluded on a positive note, appraising it as "a more accessible and deeper compendium of the unsettling facts about nuclear history, planning, and devastation."

Stanley Heller, writing in New Politics, praised Jacobsen's work as "the bible on public information about nuclear warfare". He highlighted Jacobsen's findings that the presidents have contradictory positions on the issue before and after their election, as illustrated by George W. Bush's 2000 campaign statement calling hair-trigger status "an unnecessary vestige of the Cold War." Drawing on nuclear policy analyst Joe Cirincione, Heller emphasized that the missile defense systems has "sunk $63 billion" to offer protection only in name. As alternative, he advocates nuclear bomb abolition campaigns, such as Back from the Brink and expressed hope that Jacobsen's book, or the A House of Dynamite movie, might influence policy as The Day After television film did in 1983.

=== Academic reception ===
Simon A. Bennett, writing in the Journal of Intelligence, Conflict, and Warfare, praised Jacobsen's literary approach and narrative power. He found that "admixing factual information with the imagined decapitation strike [...] produces a narrative that is informative and gripping," noting that he "found it hard to put the book down." While other works such as Young's Nuclear War in the UK and McDowall's Attack warning Red! How Britain Prepared for Nuclear War have examined thermonuclear warfare, Bennett argued that "only Jacobsen's account has the capacity to trap the reader into learning about the end of us in one sitting." He highlighted the book's integration of psychological elements, particularly the tension between the Stratcom commander and the president during the nuclear launch decision process. Bennett identified what he termed "a devastating irony at the heart of Jacobsen's scenario": how a limited strike of merely two North Korean nuclear devices escalates to global Armageddon through a chain reaction involving US uncertainty about North Korea's capabilities, the doctrine of "restoring deterrence" leading to an 82-warhead US counterstrike, and Russia's fallible Tundra satellite system misinterpreting the US launch. Applying Reason's vulnerability theory, Bennett characterized North Korea's policy of not forewarning missile tests as "a latent error—an accident or, in this case, nuclear maelström waiting to happen." He concluded that while the book represents "a plausible account" and "a treasure-store of information," its primary weakness was "Jacobsen's habit of repeating the same facts about the destructive power of thermonuclear weapons." (Note: Examples of repetition include pages xvii–xxiv (Prologue), 7–11 (Part I), 141–148, 164–166, 184–187, 203–205, 212–213 (Part III), 250–252, and 276–278 (Part IV), where Jacobsen repeatedly describes the destructive power of thermonuclear weapons.)

Mika Hayashi of Kobe University, writing in the Journal for Peace and Nuclear Disarmament, emphasized the book's central thesis that "nuclear war is insane" and highlighted how "nearly every important decision by the United States in the scenario, as well as many other turns of events, are based on facts and arguments that the author learned from interviews, declassified documents, and a wide range of information in the public domain."

John Loretz, reviewing for Medicine, Conflict and Survival, approached the book from a public health perspective, drawing on his work with International Physicians for the Prevention of Nuclear War. Loretz wrote that "reading this book through to the end if somewhat analogous to watching a demonic Rube Goldberg machine run its course: the realization that catastrophe is certain and inescapable comes early and never lets up"

The National Security Institute described the book as raising "critical questions," noting that "the theories are complex, and the solutions are anything but easy." The new nuclear era we are now in, characterised by the multiplication of nuclear armed states and the introduction of space and cyber elements, "demands first [...] that nuclear war never be played."

The work has been reviewed in the Journal of Strategic Security, demonstrating its engagement with academic security studies. Harvard's Scholars at Harvard platform has featured recommendations of the work as critical reading for understanding nuclear deterrence challenges.

=== Policy expert analysis ===
Lawrence D. Freedman, reviewing for Foreign Affairs, offered a measured critique while acknowledging the book's intent. Freedman wrote: "It is good to remind readers of the insanity of a nuclear war, but a less overheated plot might have done the job better." He questioned key plot elements, noting that "the dire conclusion of the book supposes that Washington will be unable to communicate with Moscow and head off the calamity."

Peter Huessy of the Global Security Review provided an extensive critique of the book's technical assumptions and policy analysis. Huessy, a Senior Fellow at the National Institute for Deterrence Studies, argued that the book "would be far more accurately titled, Nuclear War: A Novel or Nuclear War: Disarmament Propaganda." He challenged several of Jacobsen's core premises, arguing that she incorrectly contextualizes statements from former officials. He disputed her characterization of U.S. intercontinental ballistic missiles as being on "HAIR TRIGGER ALERT," stating that "The United States does not have a launch-on-warning or launch-under-attack policy/doctrine." Instead, he argued that the U.S. maintains "a launch-under-attack option" that "requires nothing of the president" and allows employment of ICBMs "pre-, mid-, or post-strike." Regarding missile defense, Huessy contested Jacobsen's reliance on Theodore Postol's assessments, noting that "Postol was wrong about the effectiveness of Israel's Iron Dome system" and that "hard data is proving that missile defenses...are far more effective than Postol believed." He also criticized Jacobsen's interpretation of wargaming results, arguing that she "fundamentally misunderstands the purpose and arbitrary nature of wargames" which "are not predictive of the future but are instructive of potential options." Huessy raised questions about the plausibility of Jacobsen's scenario, particularly the decision to retaliate against North Korea with ICBMs that must fly over Russia rather than using submarine-launched ballistic missiles that could avoid Russian airspace. He concluded that "Americans with little understanding of nuclear operations will believe the bias with which Jacobsen writes."

Nuclear deterrence is too important to turn over to a journalist with an agenda

— Peter Huessy, Global Security Review

Tom Z. Collina, writing for the Arms Control Association, described the book as “an excellent read for anyone who wants to understand just how quickly nuclear conflict can start and how badly it can end.” While commending Jacobsen’s storytelling and research, he noted that the scenario lacks a prescriptive conclusion, observing that “there is no solution offered here, no plan for how to avoid such a disaster.”

Mike Riggs, writing for Reason magazine, wrote that the book is a "disaster porn thriller".

== International reception ==
The book achieved significant international reach, being translated into fourteen languages. Major European markets showed substantial engagement, with the book achieving bestseller status in Germany and receiving extensive media coverage including interviews in Der Tagesspiegel and Rolling Stone Germany. The work prompted serious academic analysis, notably from France's Foundation for Strategic Research, which published a detailed critique questioning the book's technical assumptions and political framing.

Reception varied notably by geopolitical perspective. In Russian-language coverage, while acknowledging the book's research thoroughness and international bestseller status, critics highlighted what they perceived as "typical Americanisms" in its scenario construction, particularly the choice of North Korea as the initiating aggressor. Russian media outlet Moskovskij Komsomolets noted the irony that "North Koreans are presented as the culprits of nuclear apocalypse, although the only country in the world that has actually used atomic weapons is the United States."

The book's academic reception in Europe demonstrated engagement with serious policy institutions, with Italy's Fondazione Giangiacomo Feltrinelli describing it as essential reading for understanding contemporary nuclear risks, while French analysts questioned whether the work's focus on worst-case scenarios adequately represented the complexities of nuclear deterrence policy.

== Impact and legacy ==
=== Political and policy influence ===
The book has attracted attention from high-profile political figures and policy leaders. President Donald Trump has acknowledged reading the work, as Jacobsen revealed during a podcast interview On May 20, 2024, Dr. Carlos Umaña, co-president of the International Physicians for the Prevention of Nuclear War presented a copy to Pope Francis at the Vatican.

Former government officials have endorsed the book's accuracy and importance. Craig Fugate, who served as FEMA Director under President Barack Obama, "confirmed every quote [and] was one of the first people to write an Amazon review of the book" in the United States. John Podesta, who has served in senior roles under multiple Democratic presidents, encouraged Jacobsen's work, telling her "It's good you're doing this. The American people need to know."

Jacobsen has participated in international nuclear policy forums, serving as a panelist at the Third Meeting of States Parties to the Treaty on the Prohibition of Nuclear Weapons in November 2024. She also delivered a keynote address at the NukeExpo conference in Brussels in April 2024, where she spoke to members of the European Parliament and physicians from the International Physicians for the Prevention of Nuclear War. She also spoke to nuclear policy experts at a British Pugwash webinar in June 2025.

The book's international reception has reflected hopes for its educational impact on global leaders. Following its publication in South Korea, Jacobsen noted that Korean media outlets expressed the hope "that the leader of North Korea reads your book and understands there is a better way." She found this "fascinating that they felt the educational factors in the book will outweigh the presumption that he is behaving like a mad man, because he does behave like a mad man."

=== Educational and cultural impact ===
Jacobsen has framed her work within the broader context of civic education, drawing on President Dwight D. Eisenhower's concept of an "alert and knowledgeable citizenry." In interviews, she referenced Dwight D. Eisenhower's farewell address, noting that "the way in which America can function as a peaceful and democratic nation, which has a stronger defence, is through an 'alert and knowledgeable citizenry.'" Student publications have recognized the book's educational value, with the Iowa State Daily describing it as essential "required reading" for understanding contemporary nuclear risks. On October 23, 2025, Jacobsen participated in a student roundtable at Vanderbilt University's Institute of National Security alongside retired Lieutenant General Charlie Moore to discuss the book's themes.

The author has expressed hope that her book might have an impact similar to other works that influenced policy, particularly citing President Ronald Reagan's response to the 1983 television film The Day After. Jacobsen noted that "Reagan was an absolute nuclear hawk...He was working on putting nuclear weapons in space, the SDI program, the Star Wars program. [He] wrote in his presidential memoirs, he became 'greatly depressed'...after seeing the Day After miniseries. And that led to him reaching out to Gorbachev, that led to communication."

Singer-songwriter Wrabel was inspired by the book while writing his third studio album Up and Above (2026), with the title track emerging after he read Jacobsen's account of how nuclear catastrophe could unfold. The album explores themes of fragility and mortality through post-apocalyptic imagery, including mushroom clouds and decaying landscapes, with Wrabel describing the work as confronting the question: "If you knew the world was ending tomorrow, how much more would the person you love matter today?"

=== Personal and human connections ===
The book's impact extends to personal stories that bridge historical and contemporary nuclear experiences. Jacobsen described an emotionally significant encounter at a nuclear convention in Brussels, where she met a Nagasaki bombing survivor who "was 1 year and 10 months when the bomb was dropped on Nagasaki." The meeting was particularly poignant because, as Jacobsen revealed, "someone I interviewed and someone that meant a lot to me...wired that nuclear weapon that was dropped on Nagasaki." She reflected on the profound connection: "there's little old me, the reporter, who fate and circumstance put in Brussels...And one hand of my reporting goes to that source...who wired the bomb that was dropped on Nagasaki. And my other hand goes to someone who was there."

=== Declassification and transparency impact ===
The book's publication coincided with increased transparency from nuclear institutions. Jacobsen noted that the Oppenheimer movie "had a very...positive impact on Los Alamos's transparency with people like me [as] they had a real willingness to share information, [whereas before they were] on the defensive." This openness allowed her to reveal previously classified information, including "the origin story of the football [because] they declassified it for the book."

Ultimately, Jacobsen wrote Nuclear War: A Scenario so "that people will become invigorated again to have these discussions [or] come to the realization that...people's voices actually do count [because] Congress only...pays attention to what the people is talking about."

== Adaptation ==
In April 2024, it was announced that production studio Legendary Entertainment purchased the rights to adapt the book into a film, with Canadian director Denis Villeneuve set to direct. The film is slated for a 2027 release.

Director Kathryn Bigelow had originally sought to adapt Jacobsen's book, but after Legendary acquired the rights, Bigelow and co-writer Noah Oppenheim developed their own nuclear war thriller, A House of Dynamite, which was released on Netflix in October 2025. While thematically similar to Jacobsen's work—both depicting a surprise ICBM attack on the United States and exploring how officials navigate crisis decisions under extreme time pressure—critics noted distinctions in approach, with one reviewer observing that whereas Jacobsen's book examines "the nuts and bolts" of nuclear war scenarios, Bigelow's film "gives a more human and intimate perspective."

== Editions ==
=== English ===
North American editions:

- Hardcover: Jacobsen, Annie (March 26, 2024). Nuclear War: A Scenario. New York: Dutton. ISBN 978-0593476093.
- Ebook: Jacobsen, Annie (March 26, 2024). Nuclear War: A Scenario. New York: Dutton. ISBN 978-0593476109.
- Paperback: Jacobsen, Annie (July 3, 2025). Nuclear War: A Scenario. New York: Penguin. ISBN 978-1804996003.

UK/International editions:

- Hardcover: Jacobsen, Annie (March 28, 2024). Nuclear War: A Scenario. London: Torva, an imprint of Transworld. ISBN 978-1911709596.
- Ebook: Jacobsen, Annie (March 28, 2024). Nuclear War: A Scenario. London: Transworld Digital. ISBN 978-1529932058.
- Paperback: Jacobsen, Annie (July 3, 2025). Nuclear War: A Scenario. London: Torva, an imprint of Transworld. ISBN 978-1804996003.

Digital editions:

- Audiobook: Jacobsen, Annie (March 26, 2024). Nuclear War: A Scenario, narrated by Annie Jacobsen. Penguin Audio.

The cover picture of the US edition is the mushroom cloud generated by the explosion of Ivy Mike, the first thermonuclear bomb (1952).

=== Translations ===
As of January 2026, the book has been translated into fourteen languages, with fifteen international editions:

From left to right: the Chinese, Croatian, Czech, Dutch, French, German, Hebrew and Italian book covers

From left to right: South Korean, Polish, Portuguese (Portugal), Portuguese (Brazil), Russian, Spanish and Swedish book covers

Language	Title in original language	English translation	Translator(s)	Publisher	First format published	Publication date	ISBN
Chinese	核戰末日：我們與世界毀滅的距離	Nuclear War Doomsday: The Distance Between Us and World Destruction	Zheng Huansheng	Time Publishing, Taipei	Paperback	29 October 2024	ISBN 978-6263967755
Croatian	Nuklearni rat: Scenarij	Nuclear War: Scenario	Igor Buljan	V.B.Z., Zagreb	Paperback	December 2025	ISBN 978-9535208648
Czech	Jaderná válka: Scénář posledních 92 minut	Nuclear War: Scenario of the Last 92 Minutes	Tereza Kubíčková	N media, Prague	Paperback	19 September 2025	ISBN 978-80-88433-83-5
Dutch	Kernoorlog: Het scenario	Nuclear war: A Scenario	Alexander van Kesteren	Prometheus, Amsterdam	Paperback	26 March 2024	ISBN 978-9044655605
French	Guerre nucléaire: Un scénario	Nuclear war: A Scenario	Karine Lalechère	Denoël, Paris	Paperback	2 October 2024	ISBN 978-2207180877
German	72 Minuten bis zur Vernichtung: Atomkrieg	72 Minutes to Annihilation: Nuclear War	Ulrike Strerath-Bolz and Oliver Lingner	Heyne, Munich	Paperback	11 March 2024	ISBN 978-3453218789
Hebrew	מלחמה גרעינית: תרחיש	Nuclear war: A Scenario	Guy Carmit	כנרת זמורה, Tel Aviv	Paperback	1 September 2024	ISBN 978-9655747904
Italian	Guerra nucleare: Uno scenario	Nuclear war: A Scenario	Allegra Panini	Mondadori, Milan	Hardcover	14 January 2025	ISBN 978-8804787211
Korean	24분: 핵전쟁으로 인류가 종말하기까지	24 Minutes: Until Humanity Ends from Nuclear War	Kang Dong-hyuk	Munhak Dongnae, Paju	Paperback	31 January 2025	ISBN 979-11-41608-94-1
Polish	Wojna nuklearna: Możliwy scenariusz	Nuclear war: A Possible Scenario	Michał Strakow	Insignis, Warsaw	Paperback	24 October 2024	ISBN 978-8368053692
Portuguese	Guerra Nuclear: Um Cenário	Nuclear war: A Scenario	Translator not credited	Dom Quixote, Lisbon	Paperback	23 January 2025	ISBN 978-9722084680
Portuguese (Brazilian)	Guerra Nuclear: Um Cenário	Nuclear war: A Scenario	Lívia de Almeida	Editora Rocco, São Paulo	Paperback	10 February 2025	ISBN 978-6555325492
Russian	Ядерная война: Сценарий	Nuclear war: A Scenario	Translator not credited	Fortis Press, Yerevan	Hardcover	1 April 2024	ISBN 978-9939934020
Spanish	Guerra nuclear: Un escenario	Nuclear war: A Scenario	Gemma Deza Guil	Debate, Madrid	Ebook	16 January 2025	ISBN 978-8410214514
Swedish	Kärnvapenkrig: Ett scenario	Nuclear War: A Scenario	Daniel Helsing	Fri Tanke Förlag, Stockholm	Hardcover	19 August 2024	ISBN 978-91-89732-41-4

== See also ==
=== Nuclear war scenarios ===
- Fail-Safe – 1962 novel depicting accidental nuclear war through system failure
- NUKEMAP – Interactive tool for visualizing nuclear weapon effects
- Nuclear War Survival Skills – Practical guide to surviving nuclear conflict

=== Nuclear war in literature and media ===
- On Thermonuclear War – Herman Kahn's foundational 1960 strategic analysis
- The Day After – 1983 television film that influenced Reagan's nuclear policy
- Threads – 1984 British film depicting societal collapse after nuclear war

=== Historical nuclear crises ===
- Stanislav Petrov – Soviet officer who prevented nuclear war during 1983 false alarm
- Able Archer 83 – NATO exercise that nearly triggered Soviet nuclear response
- Nuclear close calls – List of incidents where nuclear war was narrowly averted

=== Contemporary nuclear issues ===
- Doomsday Clock – Symbolic assessment of current nuclear threat level
- Nuclear proliferation – Spread of nuclear weapons to additional nations
