= The Most Awful Responsibility =

2025 non-fiction book by Alex Wellerstein

- Author: Alex Wellerstein
- Published: December 9, 2025
- Publisher: HarperCollins
- ISBN: 9780063379435
- Website: alexwellerstein.com/writing/books/the-most-awful-responsibility/

The Most Awful Responsibility: Truman and the Secret Struggle for Control of the Atomic Age is a 2025 nonfiction book by Alex Wellerstein about U.S. President Truman's nuclear policy. It argues that "that the sum of his choices might lead one to conclude that Truman was the most important anti-nuclear president of the twentieth century."

== Argument ==
The book is an "atomic biography" of Truman, focused on his decisions and attitudes towards the atomic bomb over the course of his presidency. It follows many other historians in arguing that the narrative of the "decision to use the atomic bomb" promulgated by Truman and others in his administration in the 1940s and 1950s is highly misleading, as no singular "decision" was ever made about the use of the atomic bomb. But it diverges from other historians by focusing on the one "decision" that Truman himself made about the use of the bomb, when he underwrote Secretary of War Henry Stimson's push to remove Kyoto from the target list. The book argues for the importance of this often-overlooked action by Truman, and that the historical record suggests that Truman may have misunderstood the "decision" that he was making: specifically, that Truman believed, erroneously, that he had chosen that the first use of the atomic bomb would be against a "purely military" target, and not a city. The book also argues that Truman did not know that a second bomb would be used so soon after the first. Wellerstein emphasizes that when Truman told his cabinet, on August 10, 1945, that he had given the order to stop atomic bombing, he did so on the basis of his horror at the number of civilian casualties, including, as Truman told his cabinet, "all those kids" who had perished. It was this moment, Wellerstein argues, that atomic use policy became truly centralized in the personage of the president for the first time.

Wellerstein argues that Truman's later policies can be best understood in the light of his horror at the civilian consequences of the atomic bombings. Truman revoked the military's physical access to the atomic bombs, and refused to give them atomic cores until the outbreak of the Korean War (and even then, he only allowed them a total of nine, which Wellerstein, concurring with other historians, sees more about Truman currying favor with the Joint Chiefs of Staff just prior to his firing of Douglas MacArthur than as an act of belligerent intent). He supported, to varying degrees, the international control of atomic energy, and advocated publicly and privately for the banning of nuclear weapons. He privately scolded military officers who advocated for the use of atomic bombs, telling them that the atomic bomb "is used to wipe out women and children and unarmed people, and not for military uses." Publicly and privately he repeatedly expressed the belief that he never wanted to use this weapons again, in dramatic contrast with prevailing attitudes during the period of the American nuclear monopoly. When Truman did eventually give orders to expand the American nuclear arsenal, including to build the hydrogen bomb, he did so with great reluctance, and only a response to either Soviet developments (like the Korean War) or strong pressures from domestic politics.

In short, Wellerstein argues that Truman's atomic attitudes have been largely misunderstood by both his supporters and his detractors. Rather than being a hard-minded cold warrior, Wellerstein argues that Truman was deeply committed to avoiding atomic war, not out of fear of retaliation as much as out of a belief that such a war would lead to the "wholesale slaughter of human beings," particularly non-combatants, which he viewed as morally unacceptable even when used against America's enemies. His postwar atomic policies, and his centralization of atomic power in the presidency, are best understood, Wellerstein posits, as the imperfect results of Truman's desire to avoid again using the atomic bomb.

== Reception ==
Kirkus Reviews called it "A nuanced portrait of a president who shaped the modern nuclear age." A review in The Wall Street Journal said it was "a well-written opus" drawing on recently unclassified documents and private diaries of Truman's contemporaries. Library Journal said it was a "must-read book". In a review for Air Mail, documentary filmmaker Errol Morris called it "a truly great book, perhaps a masterpiece."

It was the winner of Truman Library Institute's 2026 Harry S. Truman Book Award, who cited it was a "bold and arresting interpretation of the multiple paradoxes surrounding Truman and the decision to deploy atomic weapons."
