= Richard Mingus =

American security guard at the Nevada Test Site (born 1931)

- Mingus in 2011
- Born: October 19, 1931 (age 95); Ohio, U.S.
- Occupation: Security guard at the Nevada Test Site in 1957–1993.
- Spouse: Gloria Mingus

Richard Mingus (born October 19, 1931) worked as a security guard at the Nevada Test Site in 1957–1993. During that time he secured various parts of the base such as Area 51 and Area 13. Mingus worked on many black projects such as the U2 spy plane and dozens of atomic test detonations that occurred during the cold war.

== Early life ==
Mingus was born on October 19, 1931. He fought in the Korean War. In 1957 he worked in a restaurant in the Sands Hotel and was married to his wife Gloria. Due to problems during Gloria's pregnancy, Mingus needed a solid job with hospital benefits. He applied to work on government projects and because of his veteran status was quickly accepted into the program.

== Area 51 ==
Mingus was one of the first federal services security guards assigned to Area 51. Besides securing the base facility, Mingus was responsible for the daily communication into the base from the outside world. He could never identify the base over the phone or discuss what was occurring on the base. He could not confirm the presence of anyone present there. The base was simply referred to as "Delta." The phone was answered "Thirty-two thirty two." Mingus could not even reveal his occupation to his wife up until her death.

He was responsible for guarding Project AQUATONE (the U-2 spy plane project).

== Nuclear tests ==
- Mingus's second nuclear test he stood guard over was Project 57—America's first dirty bomb test.
- Mingus participated in the Hood bomb detonation, a 74 kiloton blast. Immediately after the blast it was realized that the Atomic Energy Commission failed to secure Area 51. Mingus was dispatched to secure the base immediately. In doing this, Mingus had to cope with large amounts of radiation that had just been unleashed by the detonation.
- Some areas where Mingus was stationed—such as Area 13—were subject to lethal levels of radiation. Routine care had to be taken to avoid lung exposure to plutonium and other radioactive substances.

== Area 12 ==
Mingus spent many years in the tunnels of Area 12. These tunnels were used to facilitate nuclear testing.

== Area 25 ==
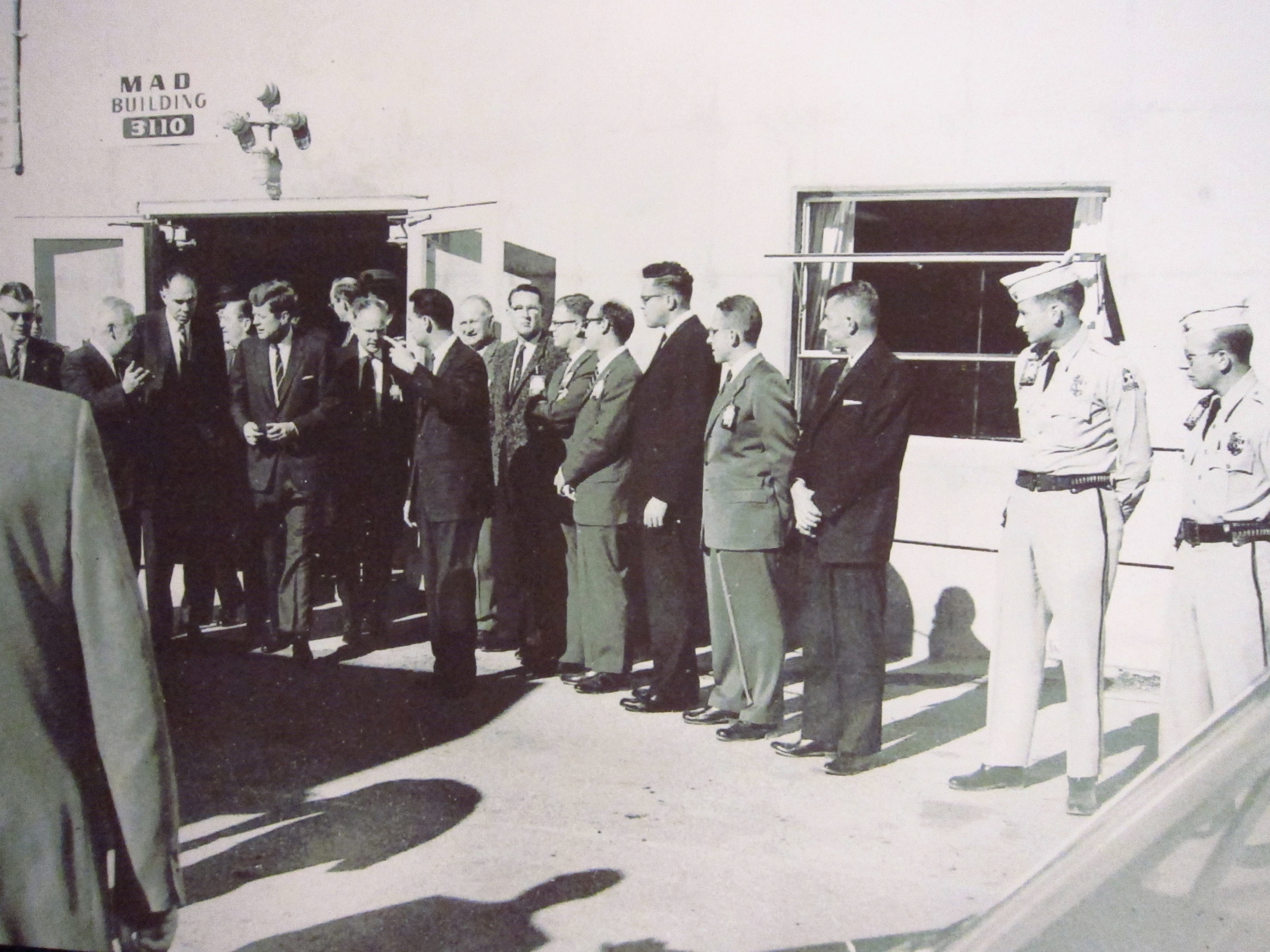
Mingus (Far right) meets president Kennedy at Area 25

Mingus was assigned to work with President John F. Kennedy's secret service detail when he visited the base in 1962. Kennedy visited the base as part of a space travel promotion tour. Behind the scenes, planning was underway for a nuclear-powered spaceship that could reach Mars.

== Failed nuclear Russian satellite ==
Mingus worked at the United States Department of Energy's emergency command center in Las Vegas on January 24, 1978 when a nuclear-powered Russian spy satellite (Cosmos 954) crashed in Canada. The top job while fielding calls at the emergency command center was to prevent Americans from panicking. All that the agency would report was that a "Space Aged Difficulty" had occurred, nothing about a nuclear-powered satellite with potential lethal fallout.

== Under attack ==
In 1982, Mingus was securing an underground test at Area 6. The base had a live nuclear bomb exposed above ground. During the process of lowering the bomb underground, the base came under attack by armed combatants. Mingus was primarily responsible for coordinating the breach up through the chain of command. President Ronald Reagan was ultimately notified and the event became a significant (and secret) national security issue. Later, it was determined that the combatants were men from Wackenhut security conducting a drill.

== Later years ==
In 2010, Mingus was featured on National Geographic's TV show, Area 51 Declassified.

As of October 2011, Mingus worked as a security guard at the Atomic Testing Museum in Las Vegas, Nevada (pictured).
