= Annie Jacobsen =

American investigative journalist and author (born 1967)

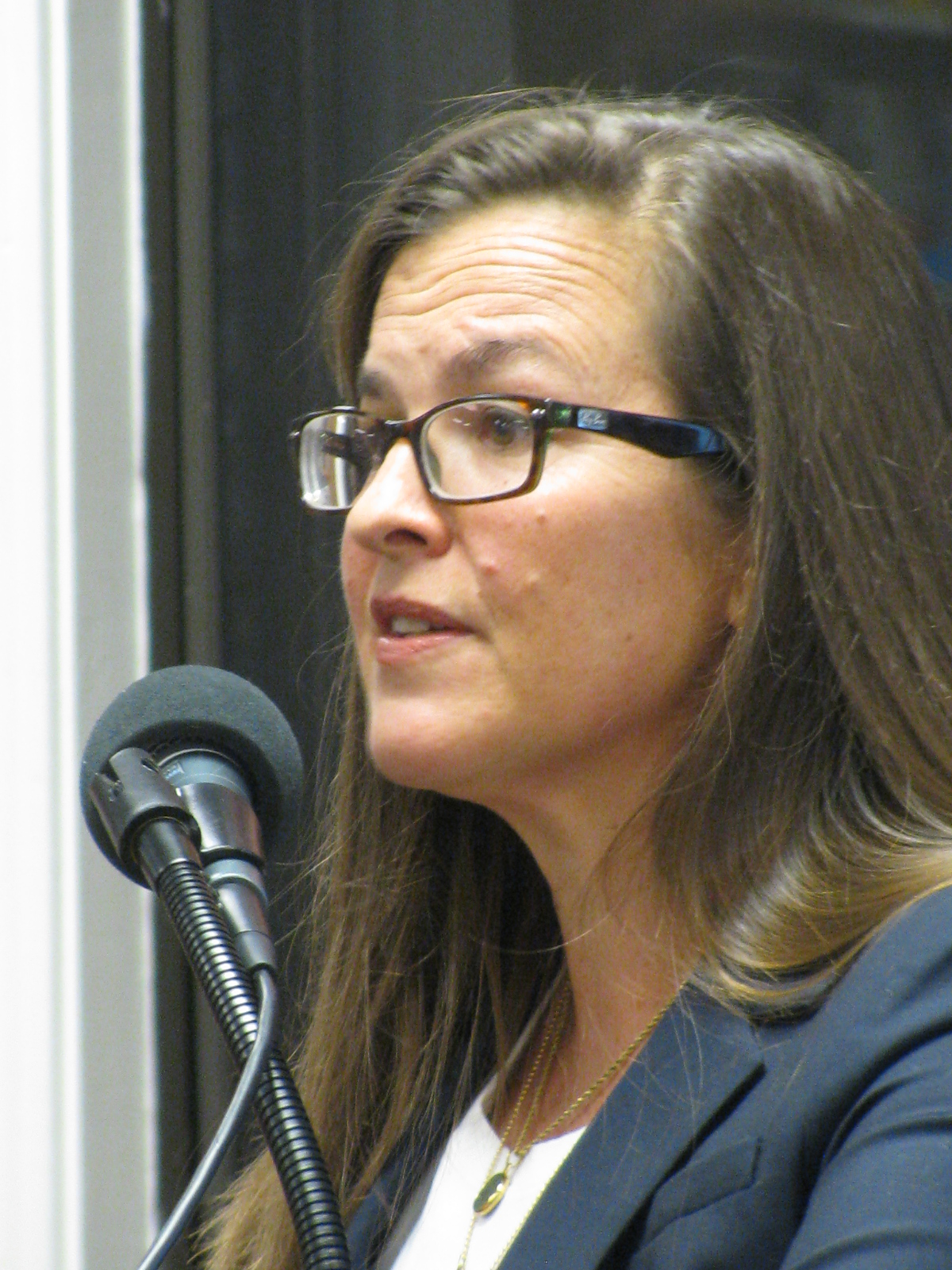
- Born: June 28, 1967 (age 59); Middletown, Connecticut, U.S.
- Education: St. Paul’s School; Princeton University
- Occupations: Journalist, fiction writer
- Website: anniejacobsen.com

Annie Jacobsen (born June 28, 1967) is an American investigative journalist, author, and a 2016 Pulitzer Prize finalist. She writes for and produces television programs, including Tom Clancy's Jack Ryan for Amazon Studios and Clarice for CBS. She was a contributing editor to the Los Angeles Times Magazine from 2009 until 2012.

Jacobsen writes about war, weapons, national security, and government secrets. Jacobsen is best known as the author of the 2011 non-fiction book Area 51: An Uncensored History of America's Top Secret Military Base, which The New York Times called "cauldron-stirring." Kai Bird of The Washington Post has said that Jacobsen "writes sensational books by addressing popular conspiracies".

== Books ==
Her 2011 book Area 51: An Uncensored History of America's Top Secret Military Base, about Area 51, makes the claim that the Roswell UFO incident was a Soviet plot to induce War of the Worlds-style hysteria. The New York Times called the book "noteworthy for its author's dogged devotion to her research." Richard Rhodes, writing in The Washington Post, was more critical of her claim and its reliance on a single source, writing: "Jacobsen shows herself at a minimum extraordinarily gullible or journalistically incompetent."

Jacobsen's 2014 book Operation Paperclip: The Secret Intelligence Program That Brought Nazi Scientists to America was called "perhaps the most comprehensive, up-to-date narrative available to the general public" about Operation Paperclip in a review by Jay Watkins for the CIA's Center for the Study of Intelligence. Operation Paperclip was included in a list of the best nonfiction books of 2014 by The Boston Globe.

The Pentagon's Brain: An Uncensored History of DARPA, America's Top Secret Military Research Agency, was chosen as finalist for the 2016 Pulitzer Prize for History. The Pulitzer committee described the book as "a brilliantly researched account of a small but powerful secret government agency whose military research profoundly affects world affairs." The Washington Post, The Boston Globe, and Amazon chose Pentagon's Brain as one of the best non-fiction books of 2015.

Her next book, Phenomena: The Secret History of the U.S. Government's Investigations into Extrasensory Perception and Psychokinesis, was published in March 2017.

In May 2019, she released Surprise, Kill, Vanish: The Secret History of CIA Paramilitary Armies, Operators, and Assassins. Apple audiobooks noted Surprise, Kill, Vanish as one of the most popular audiobooks of 2019. J. R. Seeger, a retired CIA case officer, reviewed the book, saying: "Jacobsen has a well-deserved reputation as a good writer and an excellent researcher,” but that "neither of the topics are discussed in anything resembling the detail required to understand the nuance of covert action." Kai Bird writing for The Washington Post criticized the book as "sycophantic" towards CIA paramilitaries, and noted basic factual errors and misinterpretations of sources, including misidentifying the rank and branch of service of US president John F. Kennedy.

In March 2024 Jacobsen published Nuclear War: A Scenario, a non-fiction, minute-by-minute reconstruction of a hypothetical nuclear exchange. The book was described as “terrifying” by The Wall Street Journal, called “a terrifying story told in a devastatingly straightforward way” by The Guardian, and hailed as “gripping [and] essential” by The New York Times. The book was adapted into a movie directed by Kathryn Bigelow, titled "House of Dynamite." It was released by Netflix on September 2, 2025

== Television ==
Jacobsen co-wrote three episodes of Tom Clancy's Jack Ryan TV series for Amazon Studios. She was a consulting and writing producer on all of seasons one and two.

In 2017, Amblin Entertainment and Blumhouse Productions bought the rights to her book Phenomena for a scripted TV series.

== On Flight 327 ==
In 2004, Jacobsen wrote an article about an incident she witnessed with a group of thirteen foreign nationals on board a flight from Detroit to Los Angeles. Two air marshals came out of cover during flight. FBI and homeland security agents met the aircraft when it landed.

In May 2007, the Department of Homeland Security declassified a report about the flight. The men were identified as twelve Syrians, members of a musical group, and a Lebanese man, their promoter; all were traveling illegally on expired visas. Eight of the men had "positive hits" for past criminal records and suspicious behavior. They were involved in an earlier incident on an aircraft which had them on the FBI watch list. However, the report noted that the musicians were not terrorists and law enforcement assessments at the time were appropriate.

== Works ==
- Terror in the Skies: Why 9/11 Could Happen Again. Spence Publishing Company, 2005, ISBN 1-890626-62-7.
- Area 51: An Uncensored History of America's Top Secret Military Base, Hachette Digital, Inc., 2011, ISBN 1-4091-4113-6.
- Operation Paperclip: The Secret Intelligence Program that Brought Nazi Scientists to America. Little, Brown. February 11, 2014. ISBN 978-0-316-22105-4.
- The Pentagon's Brain: An Uncensored History of DARPA, America's Top-Secret Military Research Agency. Little, Brown and Company. 2015. ISBN 978-0316371766. OCLC 900012161.
- Phenomena: The Secret History of the U.S. Government's Investigations into Extrasensory Perception and Psychokinesis. Little, Brown and Company. 2017. ISBN 978-0316349369.
- Surprise, Kill, Vanish: The Secret History of CIA Paramilitary Armies, Operators, and Assassins. Little, Brown and Company. 2019. ISBN 978-0316441438.
- First Platoon: A Story of Modern War in the Age of Identity Dominance. Dutton. 2021. ISBN 978-1524746667.
- Nuclear War: A Scenario. Penguin Publishing Group. March 26, 2024. ISBN 978-0-593-47609-3.
- Biological War: A Scenario. Penguin Publishing Group. July 28, 2026. ISBN 979-8-217-04603-4
