= Proud Prophet =

1983 U.S. war game

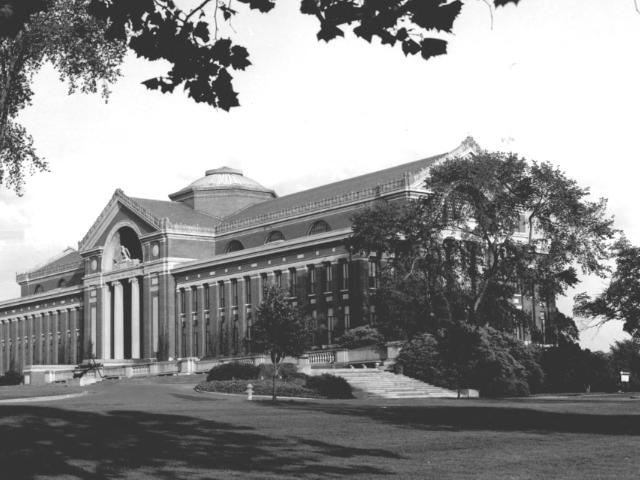
Roosevelt Hall of the National War College. The Proud Prophet war game was played in a secret facility of the college.

Proud Prophet was a real-time national-command-level war game played in the United States in the midst of the Cold War, starting on June 13, 1983. Its intent was to test out various proposals and strategies for possible nuclear war that had been proposed in response to the Soviet Union's military buildup. These strategies varied from demonstration nuclear attacks to limited nuclear war to decapitation attacks. Proud Prophet indicated that, in a conflict with the Soviet Union, following the standard US military strategy in place at the time could lead to nuclear holocaust.

The war game was necessary to "think about the unthinkable" by running through scenarios and selecting appropriate responses to nuclear strikes. The game simulated conflict in a number of regions, from East Asia to Europe and in the Mediterranean and the Middle East. It involved more than 200 military and other personnel and ran for twelve simulated days, stretched over seven weeks of calendar time. For the first time ever, the Secretary of Defense and the Chairman of the Joint Chiefs of Staff took part in a war game, although their participation was concealed. One of the main purposes was to test the National Command Authority's (NCA) decision making for multiple simultaneous situations.

During the game, the NATO forces experienced hard-pressing Soviet biological, chemical, and conventional attacks. The Secretary of Defense responded with 11 low-yield nuclear artillery shells near the front line. The Soviet player responded in kind. Over several days the nuclear strikes became larger, more numerous, and deeper. A simulated hotline between the opponents was used to explain the limited intention behind nuclear attacks, but the messages were not believed. Some of the players became emotionally involved. By the seventh simulated day of nuclear operations, hundreds of nuclear attacks had been made in Europe and around the world, destroying every major German and Polish city, Paris, London, Amsterdam, Rotterdam, and Brussels. Half a billion people would have been killed in these nuclear strikes, and many more would have died from radiation and starvation in the aftermath. Large areas of the world would have been made uninhabitable for decades.

After the wargame, the concept of managing or controlling nuclear escalation fell out of favor at the policy-making levels of the US government, as did a number of more aggressive ideas about the use of nuclear weapons. Attention turned instead to a buildup of conventional military forces, readiness for a rapid reinforcement of Europe from the United States in case of a Soviet threat, and Ronald Reagan's Strategic Defense Initiative to develop a way to shield the US and allies from nuclear attack.

The government report for Proud Prophet was not declassified until December 20, 2012, and was only declassified in part.

== Lead-up to Proud Prophet ==
=== Background ===
Ronald Reagan, President of the United States from 1981 to 1989, was elected when Cold War tensions between the United States and Soviet Union were again escalating after the Détente of the 1970s. This antagonism forced the United States leadership to contemplate the possibility of a nuclear war and how that possibility might affect the American people. By the early 1980s, the Soviet Union had been on a two-decade arms buildup, including its nuclear arsenal. The question facing the United States was how best to respond to this buildup. A number of war strategies were proposed, including launch-on-warning, demonstration nuclear attacks, limited nuclear war, decapitation attacks on Soviet command and control, shifting a war into the Far East by attacking Soviet bases there (horizontal escalation), stationing weapons in space, NATO armies charging into Eastern Europe and recruiting the Polish and Czech armies to help, and having China attack the Soviet Union in a two-front war.

The multitude of proposed strategies necessitated an evaluation of their feasibility and practicality. There was much debate on this issue, which came to a head when Andrew W. Marshall, the Director of Net Assessment, suggested that a group be set up to help the Secretary of Defense assess the various strategies and explore new options. This group would consist of military officers from each of the armed services as well as senior civilians and consultants. These individuals would be granted access to the resources that the National War College had to offer, with no military interference. This idea was not very popular with many generals, but it led to the formulation of the Strategic Concepts Development Center (SCDC) at National Defense University. Reagan's Secretary of Defense, Caspar Weinberger, brought in Phillip A. Karber as the founding director, asking him to bring in the best and brightest strategists who were not ideological and who represented a broad range of bipartisan views. This operation was done with the utmost confidentiality. Soon afterwards, the suggestion of a war game was brought up.

== Game design ==
After the idea of a war game was proposed, Karber brought in a Harvard professor, Thomas Schelling, to help design a game testing out the various proposals and possibilities for a limited nuclear war. Schelling told Weinberger shortly after accepting the position that he believed the senior government leaders were quite unprepared to make important decisions, should one of the strategies really be carried out. Weinberger was willing to be the first senior national security leader to participate in a United States war game, as long as Karber designed a secret way for him and the Chairman of the Joint Chiefs to do so and as long as he designed the game to test United States war plans and as a learning exercise and experience for the Secretary. Weinberger worried that the "fishbowl effect," fear of public exposure and embarrassment, would disturb or distort the decisions made by players within the simulation.

Another major concern that led to the confidentiality of this game involved the need to prevent a media leakage that could potentially disturb Soviet Union leaders or even leaders from allied countries. During the summer of 1983, relations between the United States and Soviet Union were poor, so President Reagan and his administration had to be very careful of media coverage and avoid negative headlines that could be potentially misinterpreted or misconstrued.

Schelling's previous wartime games like the crisis games at the RAND Corporation in the 1950s and at the US National Security Council in the early 1960s incorporated help from staffers from think tanks, the Pentagon, and the CIA, while this new game was designed so that decision-makers like the Secretary of Defense and the Chairman of the Joint Chiefs of Staff could play. Karber provided that a "Thucydidean Chronicler" would independently observe the decision making on both sides of the games; he would do so by wandering around the game and recording his impressions.

=== Educational objectives ===
The educational objectives are given in Section II, Background Information, of the declassified Proud Prophet government document. They included:

- Expose players to decisions required during a period of developing but still ambiguous threat
- Familiarize players with possible war triggers
- Involve players in the decisions required during a global conflict
- Explore the risks and benefits of a conventional escalation strategy
- Consider the impact of early decisions on the course of extended hostilities
- Determine opportunities for war termination

=== Commands and agencies involved ===
The list of organizations involved is found in Section II, Background Information, of the declassified Proud Prophet government document:

- United States Department of Defense
- United States Department of State
- Central Intelligence Agency
- Defense Intelligence Agency
- Joint Chiefs of Staff
- United States Department of the Army
- United States Department of the Navy
- United States Department of the Air Force
- United States Department of Transportation
- United States Coast Guard
- U.S. Atlantic Command
- U.S. European Command
- U.S. Pacific Command
- U.S. Readiness Command
- U.S. Southern Command
- Strategic Air Command
- Military Airlift Command
- Military Traffic Management Command
- Military Sealift Command
- Defense Nuclear Agency
- National Defense University
- Army War College
- Air War College
- Naval War College
- Army National Guard
- Air National Guard
- Army Reserve
- Naval Reserve
- Marine Corps Reserve
- Air Force Reserve
- Coast Guard Reserve
- Army Intelligence and Security Command
- 5th Psychological Operations Group
- United States Army Reserve
- Team B

=== Red Team (Soviets) ===
The role of the Red Team was to strategize and take action based on what they thought the Soviets would do during the unfolding scenario. They were essentially the Soviet Team during Proud Prophet.

==== Red Team laws of war ====
The following laws of war were followed by the Red Team and are found in Section V, Red Strategic Plan, of the declassified Proud Prophet government document. Marxism–Leninism was their foundation. The Soviets believed that war depended on four theoretical laws:

1. The war and its end result depend on strictly military forces of combatants at the beginning of the war. This is based on the Soviets analyzing both World Wars and the invention of nuclear weapons that are capable of changing the course of the war significantly.
2. The war and its end result depend mainly on military potentials of combatants. This law places emphasis on the meaning of "military potentials" and does not apply only to military forces. Instead, the Soviets went further in depth with this term by including scientific, industrial, and research base along with workforce, technical and education levels of the population. They are considered military potentials because the ability of administrative agencies to use these resources within the military.
3. The war and its end result depend on the political context. This law is based on population characteristics and how politics plays a role within the population. In order to be ready for war, the Soviets prepare psychologically, politically, and ideologically. The structure of the war must be done in a manner to maximally use propaganda throughout the war.
4. The war and its end result depend on the moral-political and psychological capabilities of the population and military of the combatants. This law requires the political figures to present the justification for the war so as to mentally prepare the military and population. This is done by making the enemy seem unjust and educating the population about how the effect of nuclear weapons is not as bad as it seems. Basically, it is a mental preparation for the nation as a whole so that there is "positive energy" going into the war.

==== Red national goals ====
The national goals are found in Section V, Red Strategic Plan, of the declassified Proud Prophet government document. These were the goals that the Red Team wanted to achieve. Any action taken during Proud Prophet was to be a step forward towards these goals.

1. Preserve the power of the ruling Communist Party.
2. Defend the homeland and ensure progress toward communism.
3. Defend acquired territories (Warsaw Pact countries) and further assimilate them.
4. Exploit every opportunity to expand Red control and disrupt capitalist control in order to shift the correlation of forces in favor of Red.

==== Red Team strategic principles ====
The following are found in Section V, Red Strategic Plan, of the declassified Proud Prophet government document. The 14 basic strategic principles that the Red Team followed were:

1. Foment dissension in the enemy camp by supporting one or more internal dissident movements.
2. Do not support an ally if, in doing so, you will make him too strong.
3. Use the forces of allies, or even better one's enemy, to defeat the primary opponent.
4. Do not let your enemy grow too weak too soon if a third party will be the primary beneficiary rather than yourself.
5. Use propaganda and demands for concessions incessantly on the principle that familiarity with uncongenial subjects eventually breeds readiness to take them for granted.
6. Use terror on prospective areas to be conquered so the population will greet your conquest with relief.
7. Be flexible in approach and accept compromises as the basis for the new demands.
8. Use peace talks and truces as a time for regrouping, employing deception, and taking whatever advantage the opponent will tolerate.
9. Avoid two-front wars.
10. Be patient, do not ask for everything at once. Ensure thorough consolidation of previous positions before advancing.
11. Build such an overwhelming military power that an opponent will realize he must accommodate.
12. Combine offensive and defensive methods, tools, and weapons in a coordinated manner designed to ensure retention of the initiative.
13. Use the psychological technique known as "reflexive control" to lead an opponent into unwittingly doing what you want.
14. Remember the critical importance of time as a key factor in warfare. Establish time-phased goals based on thorough testing to determine minimum realistic and feasible times required to accomplish missions.

==== Red Team non-military forms of war ====
The Soviets were thought to believe that they had more strength in their non-military forms of war in comparison to the Western countries. Consequently, the Red Team was to maximize the use of these forms of war. The following three non-military forms of war can be found in Section V, Red Strategic Plan, of the declassified Proud Prophet government document.

1. Economic - Use Western weaknesses in financial structure and energy resources as levers to create unemployment, panic and clashes between peoples and governments.
2. Cultural - Use cultural concerns as psychological levers to prevent Western use of nuclear weapons.
3. Political - Manipulate local political interests, as well as groups and individuals.

== Game Play ==
Proud Prophet began on May 2, 1983, with a full day of simulation. It was played in real-time at a secret facility of the National War College, a component of the National Defense University located at Fort Lesley J. McNair, Washington, D.C., and at military bases around the world. Actual top-secret war plans were incorporated, making this game the most realistic exercise involving nuclear weapons by the United States government during the Cold War. The game involved the President of the United States or his stand-in running through real procedural checklists with choices of prescribed options. Many high ranking military officers in Washington were in contact with military command posts across the globe via top-secret links. Every morning founding director Karber traveled across the Potomac River to the Pentagon or used a red phone to call the Secretary and Chairman to discuss the scenario being played out in East Asia, the Mediterranean, Europe, and the Middle East. They then talked about what actions needed to be taken, discussing the United States' policy, possible alliance reactions, and potential strategic moves that should be taken. Available reaction time was made as realistic as possible. With security being of top priority, only a limited number of individuals knew who was actually involved, preventing a major media leak.

During the first four simulated days, the Soviets (as played by the Red Team) mobilized forces under cover of a giant training exercise and made a covert biological attack on Bonn, the capital of West Germany. NATO forces were moved into defensive positions. When shooting started, the NATO defenses held in the southern and central parts of the line but were forced back in the north. The Soviets attacked Ramstein Air Base and other air bases, using chemical weapons. On the fifth simulated day, with Soviet troops near Hamburg and the northern line about to collapse, Secretary of Defense Weinberger authorized the use of 11 subkiloton nuclear artillery rounds to stabilize the NATO line. The Soviet advance paused, but they replied with their own nuclear artillery. More nuclear exchanges followed, but only near the front line for the first few days. For a while it looked like restraint might prevail. However, nuclear exchanges gradually extended north and south along the line, and both sides started using aircraft and missiles to attack rear area targets using warheads with tens of kilotons of yield. After three days of nuclear war, Bonn, Hamburg, all regional NATO and Warsaw Pact air bases, and dozens of bridges across the Oder River had been destroyed. A simulated text-based hotline between the opposing commanders was in use during these exchanges to communicate the limited intent of the strikes, but messages on it were not trusted. By the fifth day of nuclear operations, high-yield strategic warheads had been used in western Germany, Belgium, the Netherlands, Poland, and the Kaliningrad exclave of the Soviet Union. By the seventh, there had been dozens of high-yield strikes in France, England, and eastern Poland. All these strikes were aimed at military targets, but collateral damage was extensive. Some of the players became emotionally involved. Paris, London, Amsterdam, Rotterdam, Brussels, and every major city in Germany and Poland were destroyed. Other strikes hit Sweden, Belarus, the Baltics, Japan, South Korea, the Philippines, Alaska, and Hawaii. In the end, half a billion people would have been killed in the nuclear exchanges and at least that many more would have died from radiation and starvation. Major parts of the northern hemisphere would have been uninhabitable for decades.

== Impact ==
Limited nuclear strikes such as those played in Proud Prophet were supposed to make the Soviet leaders to come to their senses and accept a ceasefire, thus limiting the nuclear war. Instead, the team representing the Soviet Union interpreted the strikes as an attack and threat on their nation, way of life, and honor. This led to an escalating exchange of retaliations, and ultimately to global catastrophe. This terrible outcome had a chastening and moderating impact on the Reagan's administration's rhetoric and thinking on nuclear war. President Reagan's rhetoric concerning the Soviets moderated. Ideas about successfully fighting a nuclear war (launch-on-warning, demonstration nuclear attacks, limited nuclear war, etc.) lost favor. The chairman of the Joint Chiefs John William Vessey spent the next several years revamping the United States' war plans. Nuclear threats were gone and the new emphasis was focused on meeting Soviet conventional strength with the United States' conventional forces and following a long-term competitive strategy. With the example of Proud Prophet in mind, and the absolute catastrophe that nuclear war would bring, President Reagan re-evaluated how he dealt with the Soviets, and focused more on de-escalation rather than nuclear strong-arming.

Proud Prophet occurred in 1983, a dangerous year. After the exercise, there were the destruction of Korean Air Flight 007, the Petrov incident, and the Able Archer incident. The Soviet leaders were becoming obsessed and potentially dangerous, more than the players of Proud Prophet realized. The exercise had a profound effect on how the United States approached the possibility of a nuclear war.

== See also ==
- Able Archer
- RYAN
- KAL-007
- Continuity of Government
