= Nukemap =

Declassified nuclear weapons effects data map software

NUKEMAP
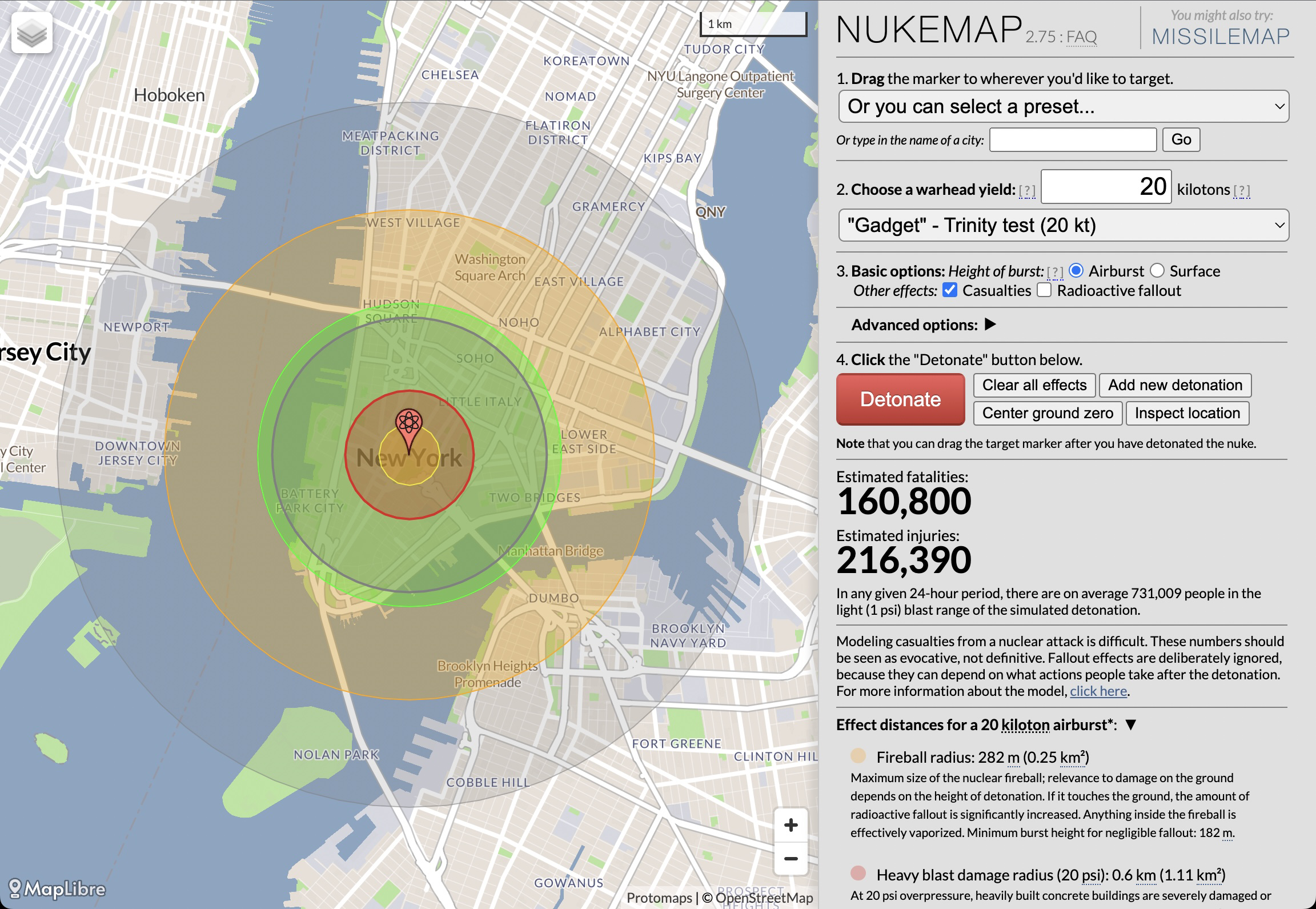
- Screenshot of NUKEMAP as of December 2023
- Website type: educational
- Available in: English
- Owner: Alex Wellerstein
- Website: https://nuclearsecrecy.com/nukemap
- Launched: 2012
- Current status: Active

Nukemap (stylised in all caps) is a web application used to visualize the effects of nuclear weapons. It was created by Alex Wellerstein, a historian of science at the Stevens Institute of Technology who studies the history of nuclear weapons. It uses declassified nuclear weapons effects data and an interactive mapping API to represent the effects of a nuclear detonation: blast, thermal radiation, ionizing radiation, and nuclear fallout, among others, and can model weapons with different explosive yields, heights of burst, and fission fractions. It can also provide estimates for the casualties of such a detonation.

== Background ==
The initial version was created in February 2012, with major upgrades in July 2013, which enables users to model the explosion of nuclear weapons (contemporary, historical, or of any given arbitrary yield) on virtually any terrain and at virtually any altitude of their choice. A variation of the script, Nukemap3D, featured rough models of mushroom clouds in 3D, scaled to their appropriate sizes. (Since Google deprecated the Google Earth plugin in 2016, Nukemap3D has not been functional. It is possible to export the Nukemap3D mushroom cloud files within Nukemap, using its "Export to KMZ" tool.)

The computer simulation of the effects of nuclear detonations has been described both as "stomach-churning" (by Wellerstein himself) and as "the most fun I’ve had with Google Maps since… well, possibly ever" despite the admittedly abjectly grim nature of the subject. Originally intended in part as a pedagogical device to illustrate the stark difference in scale between fission and fusion bombs, Nukemap went viral in 2013, necessitating a move to new servers. The website averages five "nukes" per visitor. Wellerstein's creation has garnered some popularity amongst nuclear strategists as an open source tool for calculating the costs of nuclear exchanges.

The Nukemap was a finalist for the National Science Foundation's Visualization Challenge in 2014.

The initial version of the application used the Google Maps API. In 2018, Google's API changed its pricing, and it was converted to use the Mapbox API, which at the time was cheaper. As of 2023, it was converted to use Protomaps, a self-hosted, open-source mapping platform that relies on OpenStreetMap data and the MapLibre API.

== See also ==
- Computer simulation
