= Pacific Proving Grounds =

American nuclear testing sites, 1946–1962

Pacific Proving Grounds/Pacific Test Site
- primarily in the Marshall Islands
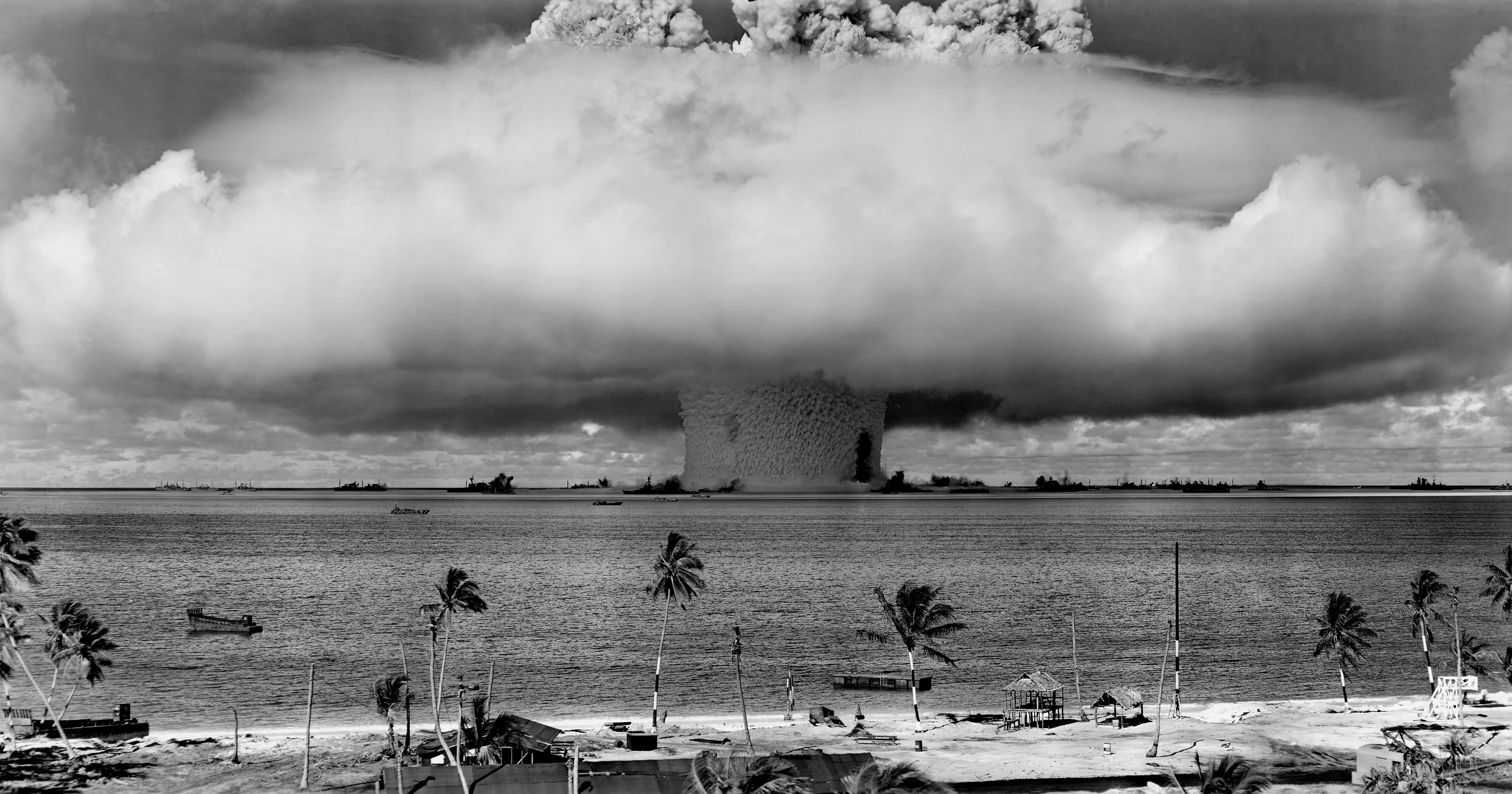
- The United States began using the Marshall Islands as a nuclear testing site beginning in 1946.

Site information
- Type: Nuclear testing range
- Operator: United States Department of Energy
- Status: Inactive

Location
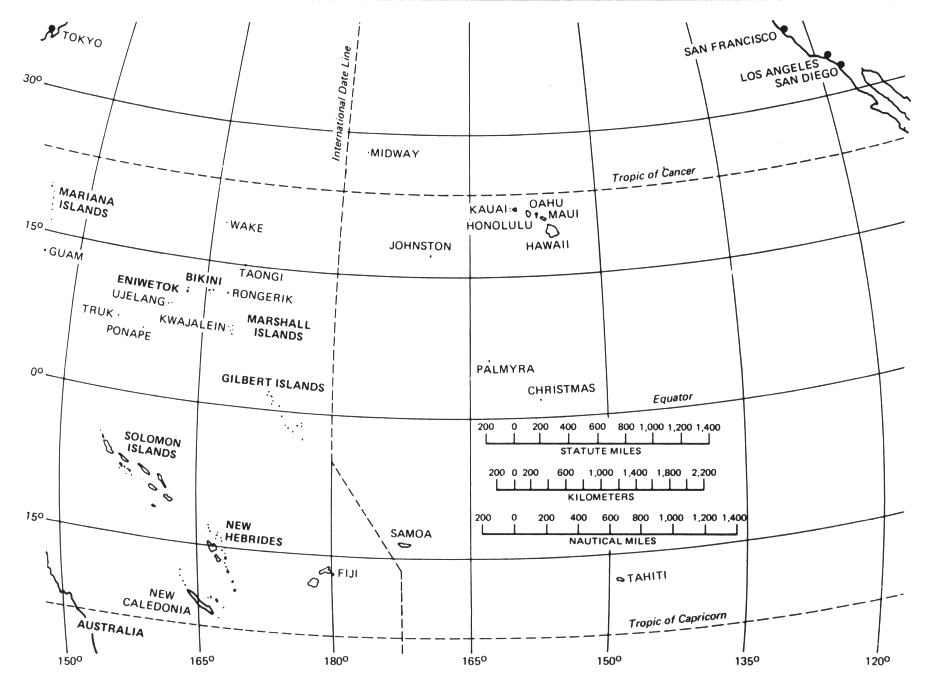
- Map showing location of the Pacific Proving Grounds relative to rest of Pacific Ocean
- Area: ~140,000 sq mi (360,000 km^{2})

Site history
- In use: 1947–present (last nuclear test in 1962)

Test information
- Nuclear tests: 105

The Pacific Proving Grounds was the name given by the United States government to a number of sites in the Marshall Islands and a few other sites in the Pacific Ocean at which it conducted nuclear testing between 1946 and 1962. The U.S. tested a nuclear weapon (codenamed Able) on Bikini Atoll on June 30, 1946. This was followed by Baker on July 24, 1946 (dates are Universal Time, local dates were July 1 and 25, respectively).

On July 18, 1947, the United States secured an agreement with the United Nations to govern the islands of Micronesia as the Trust Territory of the Pacific Islands, a strategic trusteeship territory. This is the only such trusteeship ever granted by the United Nations to the United States. The Trust Territory comprised about 2,000 islands spread over 3,000,000 square miles (7,800,000 km^{2}) of the North Pacific Ocean. Five days later, the United States Atomic Energy Commission established the Pacific Proving Grounds.

The United States conducted 105 atmospheric and underwater (i.e., not underground) nuclear tests in the Pacific, many with extremely high yields. While the Marshall Islands testing composed 14% of all U.S. tests, it composed nearly 80% of the total yields of those detonated by the U.S., with an estimated total yield of around 210 megatons, with the largest being the 15 Mt Castle Bravo shot of 1954 which spread considerable nuclear fallout on many of the islands, including several that were inhabited and some that had not been evacuated.

Many of the islands which were part of the Pacific Proving Grounds are still contaminated from the nuclear fallout, and many of those who were living on the islands at the time of testing have suffered from an increased incidence of various health problems. Through the Radiation Exposure Compensation Act of 1990, at least $759 million has been paid to Marshall Islanders as compensation for their exposure to U.S. nuclear testing. Following the Castle Bravo accident, the U.S. paid $15.3 million to Japan.

Scientists have calculated that the residents of the Marshall Islands during their lifetimes will be diagnosed with an added 1.6% (with 90% uncertainty range 0.4% to 3.4%) cancers attributable to fallout-related radiation exposures. The cancers are the consequence of exposure to ionizing radiation from weapons test fallout deposited during the testing period (1948–1958) and from residual radioactive sources during the subsequent 12 years (1959–1970).

== Strategic Trust Territory ==
On July 18, 1947, the United States convinced the United Nations to designate the islands of Micronesia as the Strategic Trust Territory. This was the only trust ever granted by the U.N. The directive stated that the United States should "promote the economic advancement and self-sufficiency of the inhabitants, and to this end shall... protect the inhabitants against the loss of their lands and resources..."

The United States Navy controlled the Trust from a headquarters in Guam until 1951, when the United States Department of the Interior took over control, administering the territory from a base in Saipan.

Despite the promise to "protect the inhabitants", from July 1946 through July 1947, the residents of Bikini Atoll who had been relocated to Rongerik Atoll were starving for lack of food. A team of U.S. investigators concluded in late 1947 that the islanders must be moved immediately. Press from around the world harshly criticized the U.S. Navy for ignoring the people. Harold Ickes, a syndicated columnist, wrote "The natives are actually and literally starving to death." The islanders were later moved again to Kili Island, which is not surrounded by a reef. The island does not support the inhabitants' traditional way of life.

=== Radiation exposure ===
Because of the large amount of atmospheric testing, and especially the Castle Bravo accident of 1954, many of the islands which were part of the Pacific Proving Grounds are still contaminated by nuclear fallout.

Scientists calculated in 2010 that during the lifetimes of members of the Marshall Islands population, potentially exposed to ionizing radiation from weapons test fallout deposited during the testing period (1948–1958) and from residual radioactive sources during the subsequent 12 years (1959–1970), perhaps 1.6% (with 90% uncertainty range 0.4% to 3.4%) of all cancers might be attributable to fallout-related radiation exposures. By sub-population, the projected proportion of cancers attributable to radiation from fallout from all nuclear tests conducted in the Marshall Islands is 55% (with a 28% to 69% uncertainty range) among 82 persons exposed in 1954 on Rongelap Atoll and Ailinginae Atoll, 10% (2.4% to 22%) for 157 persons exposed on Utirik Atoll, and 2.2% (0.5% to 4.8%) and 0.8% (0.2% to 1.8%), respectively, for the much larger populations exposed in mid-latitude locations including Kwajalein and in southern locations including Majuro.

=== Compensation ===
Since 1956, the U.S. has paid at least $759 million to Marshall Islanders as compensation for their exposure to U.S. nuclear testing. Following the Castle Bravo accident on March 1, 1954, the U.S. paid $15.3 million to Japan.

In June 1983, the U.S. and the Marshall islanders signed the Compact of Free Association, which gave the Marshall Islands independence. The Compact became effective in 1986 and was subsequently modified by the Amended Compact that became effective in 2004. It also established the Nuclear Claims Tribunal, which was given the task of adjudicating compensation for victims and families affected by the nuclear testing program. Section 177 of the compact provided for reparations to the Bikini islanders and other northern atolls for damages. It included $150 million to be paid over a 15-year period ending in 2001. During that time, payments averaging about $18 million per year were made to the peoples of Bikini, Enewetak, Rongelap, and Utrik for medical and radiological monitoring, and in response to claims. The payments began in 1987 with $2.4 million paid annually to the entire Bikini population, while the remaining $2.6 million is paid into The Bikini Claims Trust Fund. This trust is intended to exist in perpetuity and to provide the islanders a 5% payment from the trust annually.

The United States also passed the Radiation Exposure Compensation Act in 1990 to allow individuals to file claims for compensation in relation to testing as well as those employed at nuclear weapons facilities.

On March 5, 2001, the Nuclear Claims Tribunal ruled against the United States for damages done to the islands and its people. The Nuclear Claims Tribunal awarded the islanders a total of $563,315,500 after deducting past awards. However, the U.S. Congress has failed to fund the settlement. The only recourse is for the Bikini people to petition the U.S. Congress to fund the payment and fulfill this award. The United States Supreme Court turned down the islanders' appeal of the United States courts of appeals decision that refused to compel the government to fund their claim.

As of 2012, trusts remaining from the settlement produced about US$6 to $8 million annually in investment income, and the trusts paid out about US$15,000 per family each year in benefits.

== Testing chronology ==
=== Operation Crossroads (1946) ===
The "Baker" shot of Operation Crossroads in 1946 was an underwater shot.

The first use of the Pacific Proving Grounds was during Operation Crossroads, the first nuclear testing done after the atomic bombing of Hiroshima and Nagasaki. Two fission bombs, both with a yield of 21 kilotons, were tested at Bikini Atoll. "Able" was detonated at an altitude of 520 ft (158 m) on July 1, 1946, and "Baker" was detonated at a depth of 90 ft (27 m) underwater on July 25. Both tests used a flotilla of obsolete vessels from World War II with the intent of learning the effects of nuclear weapons on naval fleets. The "Baker" shot created a large condensation cloud and spread much more radioactive water onto the ships than was expected; many of the surviving ships became too "hot" to be used or decontaminated and eventually had to be sunk.

=== Operation Sandstone (1948) ===
Three weapons were detonated on the Enewetak Atoll as part of Operation Sandstone in 1948.

=== Operation Greenhouse (1951) ===
Four weapons were detonated on the Enewetak Atoll as part of Operation Greenhouse in 1951. Two are of particular note: Greenhouse "Item" was the first use of a boosted fission weapon, and "George" was a thermonuclear experiment designed to prove the feasibility of the Teller-Ulam design for the possibility of developing hydrogen bombs.

=== Operation Ivy (1952) ===
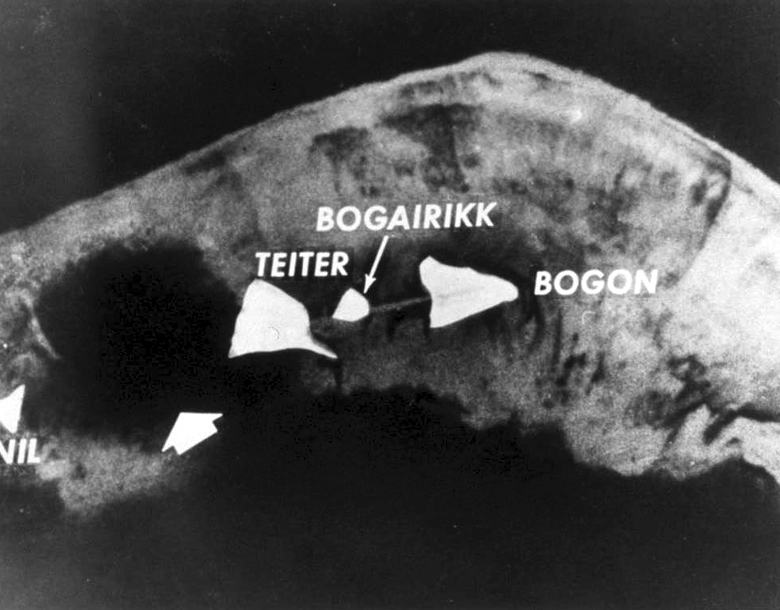
After the Ivy Mike shot, only a large crater (at left) remained of the island of Elugelab.

Two weapons were detonated at the Enewetak Atoll as part of Operation Ivy in 1952. One of them, Ivy King, was the largest pure-fission bomb ever detonated, with a yield of 500 kilotons, and the other, Ivy Mike, was the first hydrogen bomb device (it was too large to be an actual weapon), with a yield of 10.4 Mt.

=== Operation Castle (1954) ===
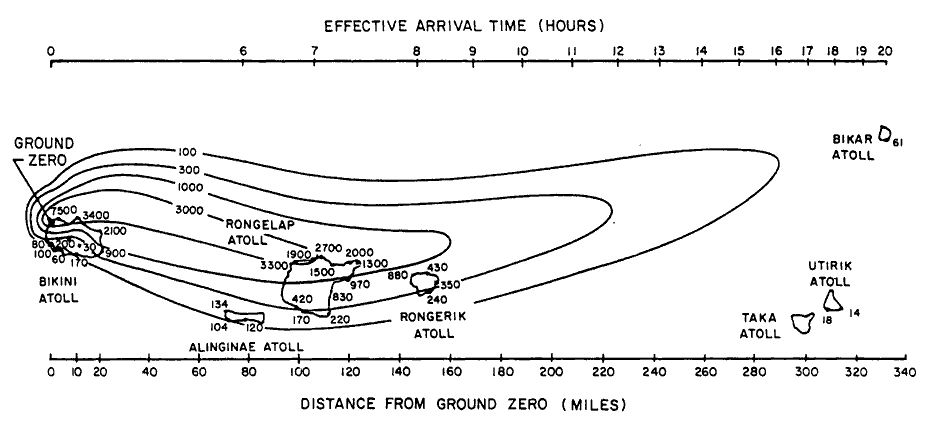
The Castle Bravo test of 1954 spread nuclear fallout across the Marshall Islands, parts of which were still inhabited.

Six very large nuclear tests were conducted at the Bikini Atoll and the Enewetak Atoll as part of Operation Castle in 1954. The most notable was Castle Bravo, which was the first deployable (dry fuel) hydrogen bomb developed by the United States. Its yield, at 15 Mt, was over twice as powerful as was predicted, and remains the largest weapon ever detonated by the United States. It spread nuclear fallout over a wide area, including the Enewetak Atoll, Rongerik Atoll, Ailinginae Atoll, and Rongelap Atoll. The U.S. Navy evacuated the islanders within the next few days, but many of the natives were exposed to radiation prior to evacuation. The fishermen aboard the Japanese fishing vessel Daigo Fukuryu Maru were also exposed, and one man died soon after from complications of radiation sickness, resulting in considerable international controversy.

=== Operation Redwing (1956) ===
Seventeen nuclear weapons were detonated on the Bikini and Enewetak Atolls as part of Operation Redwing in 1956. Many of them were designed to prove the feasibility of numerous thermonuclear weapon designs, with yields ranging from around 2 to 5 Mt.

=== Operation Hardtack I (1958) ===
Thirty-five weapons were detonated at the Bikini Atoll, Enewetak Atoll, and Johnston Island as part of Operation Hardtack I in 1958.

=== Operation Dominic (1962) ===
Thirty-six weapons were detonated at sites in the Pacific Ocean in the vicinity of Christmas Island and Johnston Atoll as part of Operation Dominic I. Though these tests were not conducted in the Marshall Islands, they are officially considered part of the Pacific Proving Grounds. The portion of the Dominic series of tests that were high altitude nuclear explosions were known as Operation Fishbowl, though not all were successful (one detonated on launchpad and resulted in a substantial plutonium contamination). Two of the tests were of operational weapons systems—the ASROC anti-submarine rocket and the Polaris SLBM (the latter test, Frigate Bird, was the only operational submarine-launched ballistic missile test with a live warhead ever undertaken by the USA).

== Partial Test Ban Treaty ==
The signing of the Partial Test Ban Treaty in 1963 forbade atmospheric and underwater nuclear weapons, and so no further U.S. tests were conducted at the Pacific Proving Grounds, with all but ten occurring at the Nevada Test Site until the end of testing in 1992.

== Geographical names ==
The Bikini and Enewetak Atolls are both collections of islands. Various names have been assigned to the islands over time, and confusion over the names (and their alternate transliterations) has been the source of much confusion. In addition, some islands over time have appeared, disappeared, separated, joined, and been excavated by bombs. Here are the islands listed in clockwise fashion starting with left side of the major inlet into the lagoon in each atoll. The names include the official Marshall Island names, the American military names used after occupation through the atomic testing period, and the Japanese names used while they occupied the islands during World War II, plus names gleaned from other sources.

Islands in the Bikini Atoll
Marshall Islander's name	US Military name	Japanese name	Other found
			Aerokoj (Note: One map shows Aerokoj separate from Aerokojlol.)
Aerokojlol	Peter	Airukiraru	Aerokoj
Bikdrin	Roger	Bigiren	
Lele	Sugar	Reere	
Enemen	Tare	Eniman	
Enidrik	Uncle	Enirik	
Lukoj	Victor	Rukoji	
Jelete	William	Chieerete	
Adrikan	Yoke	Arrikan	
Oroken	Zebra	Ourukaen	
Bokaetoktok	Alpha	Bokoaetokutoka	
Bokdrlul	Bravo	Bokororyuru	Bokdrolul
			Bokbata
			Bokonejein
Nam	Charlie	Namu	
Iroij	Dog	Yurochi	
Odrik	Easy	Yorikku	
Lomilik	Fox	Romurikku	
Aomen	George	Aomeon	Aomoen
Bikini	How	Bikini	
Bakantauk	Item	Bokonfaaku	Bokonfuaaku, Bokantuak
Lomelen	Jig	Yomyaran	Iomeman
Enealo	King	Eniairo	
Rojkere	Love	Rochikarai	Rokere
Eonjebi	Mike	Ionchebi	
Eneu	Nan	Enyu	

Islands in the Enewetak Atoll
Marshall Islander's name	US Military name	Japanese name	Other found
Ikuren	Glenn	Igurin	
Mutt	Henry		Mui, Buganegan
Boken	Irwin	Pokon	Bogan
Ribewon	James	Ribaion	Libiron
Kidrenin	Keith	Giriinien	Girinian, Kiorenen, Grinem
Biken	Leroy	Rigli	Rigili
Unibor	Mack		
Drekatimon	Oscar		
	Noah		
Bokoluo	Alice		Bogallua
Bokombako	Belle		Bogumbogo
Kirunu	Clara	Ruchi	Kiruna
Louj	Daisy	Cochiti	
Bocinwotme	Edna		Bokinwotme, San Idelfonso
Elugelab	Flora		Eluklab, Eybbivae
Dridrilbwij	Gene	Teiteiripucci	Teiteir, Lidilbut
Bokaidrikdrik	Helen		Bogairikk, Bogeirik
Boken	Irene		Bokon, Bogon
Enjebi	Janet		Engebi
Mijikadrek	Kate	Mujinikaroku	MuzinBaarappu, Mujinkarikku
Kidrinen	Lucy	Kirinian	
Taiwel	Percy		Billee
Bokenelab	Mary	Bokonaarappu	Bokenelan
Elle	Nancy	Yeiri	
Aej	Olive	Aitsu	
Lujor	Pearl	Rujoru	Rujiyoru
Eleleron	Ruby	Ebeiru	Eberiru
Aomen	Sally		Aomon
Bijire	Tilda	Biljiri	
Lojwa	Ursula	Rojga	Rojoa
Alembel	Vera	Aaraanbiru	Arambiru
Billae	Wilma	Piiraar	Piirai
Runit	Yvonne		
Runit Southern	Zona		
Boko	Sam		
Munjor	Tom		
Inedral	Uriah		
	Van		
Jinedrol	Alvin	Chinieero	Jinedrol
Ananij	Bruce	Aniyaanii	
Jinimi	Clyde	Chinimi	
Japtan	David	Anarij	
Jedrol	Rex	Jieroru	Jeroru, Muti
Medren	Elmer		Parry
Bokandretok	Walt		
Eniwetok	Fred		Enewetak

== See also ==
- Nuclear weapons of the United States
- Nuclear labor issues
