= Enewetak Atoll =

Coral atoll in the Marshall Islands; site of U.S. nuclear testing during the Cold War

Enewetak
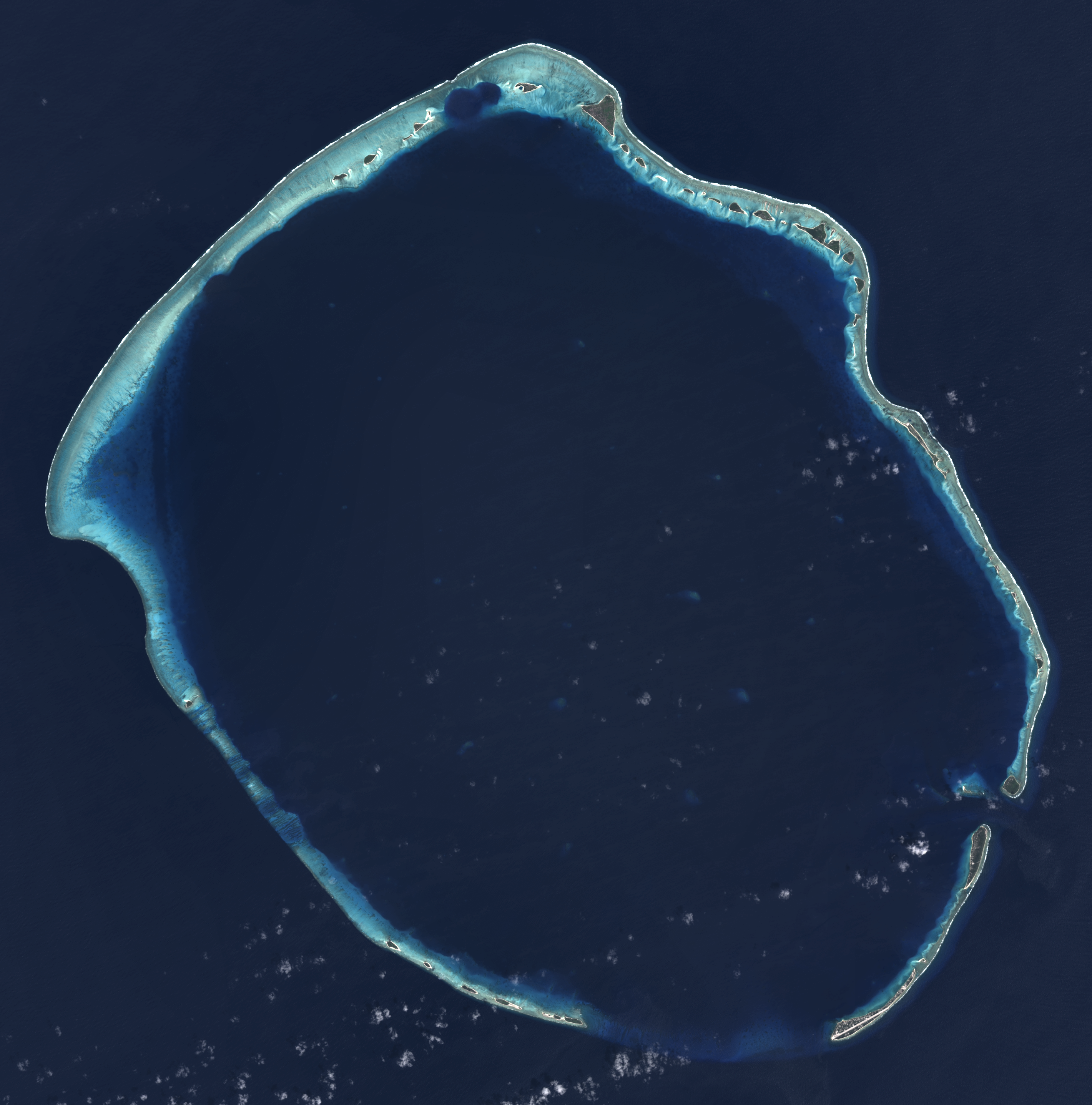
- Landsat 8 satellite image of Enewetak Atoll. The crater formed by the Ivy Mike nuclear test can be seen near the north cape of the atoll, with the smaller Castle Nectar crater adjoining it.

- Map of the Marshall Islands highlighting the Enewetak Atoll in red

- Location within Marshall Islands

Geography
- Location: North Pacific
- Coordinates: 11°30′N 162°20′E
- Archipelago: Ralik
- Total islands: 40
- Area: 5.85 km^{2} (2.26 sq mi)
- Highest elevation: 5 m (16 ft)

Administration
- Marshall Islands

Demographics
- Population: 296 (2021)
- Ethnic groups: Marshallese

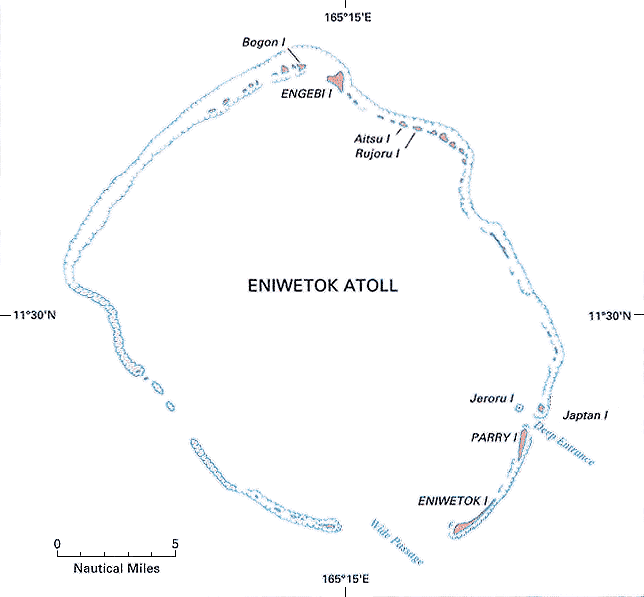
Map of Enewetak Atoll

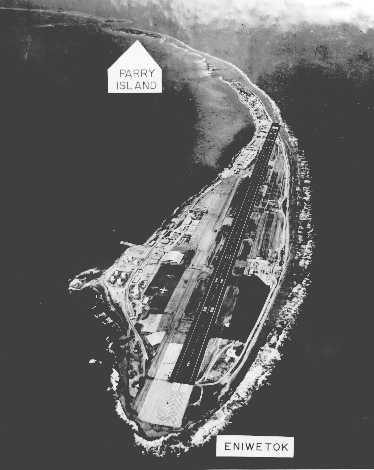
Aerial view of Enewetak and Parry

Enewetak Atoll (/ɛˈniːwəˌtɔːk, ˌɛnɪˈwiːtɔːk/; also spelled Eniwetok Atoll or sometimes Eniewetok; Marshallese: Ānewetak, [ænʲeːwɛːdˠɑk], or Āne-wātak, [ænʲeːwæːdˠɑk]; known to the Japanese as Brown Atoll or Brown Island; Japanese: ブラウン環礁) is a large coral atoll of 40 islands in the Pacific Ocean and with its 296 people (as of 2021) forms a legislative district of the Ralik Chain of the Marshall Islands. With a land area total less than 5.85 square kilometers (2.26 sq mi), it is no higher than 5 meters (16.4 ft) and surrounds a deep central lagoon, 80 kilometers (50 mi) in circumference. It is the second-westernmost atoll of the Ralik Chain and is 305 kilometers (190 mi) west from Bikini Atoll.

It was held by the Japanese from 1914 until its capture by the United States in February 1944 during World War II, then became Naval Base Eniwetok. Nuclear testing by the US, totaling the equivalent of over 30 megatons of TNT, took place during the Cold War; in 1977–1980, a concrete dome (the Runit Dome) was built on Runit Island to deposit radioactive soil and debris.

The Runit Dome is deteriorating and could be breached by a typhoon, though the sediments in the lagoon are even more radioactive than those which are contained.

== Etymology ==
The U.S. government referred to the atoll as "Eniwetok" until 1974, when it changed its official spelling to "Enewetak" (along with many other Marshall Islands place names, to more properly reflect their pronunciation by the Marshall Islanders).

== Geography ==
Enewetak Atoll formed atop a seamount. The seamount was formed in the late Cretaceous. This seamount is now about 1,400 meters (4,600 ft) below sea level. It is made of basalt, and its depth is due to a general subsidence of the entire region and not because of erosion.

Enewetak has a mean elevation above sea level of 3 meters (9.8 ft).

== History ==
Humans have inhabited the atoll since about 1,000 B.C.

The islands were first settled by Austronesian islanders.

The first European colonizers to Enewetak, Spanish explorer Álvaro de Saavedra Cerón, arrived on 10 October 1529. He called the island "Los Jardines" (The Gardens). In 1794, sailors aboard the British merchant sloop Walpole called the islands "Brown's Range" (thus, the Japanese name "Brown Atoll"). It was visited by about a dozen ships before the establishment of the German colony of the Marshall Islands in 1885.

=== The World Wars ===
With the rest of the Marshalls, Enewetak was captured by the Imperial Japanese Navy in 1914, during World War I and mandated to the Empire of Japan by the League of Nations in 1920. The Japanese administered the island under the South Seas Mandate, but mostly left affairs in hands of traditional local leaders until the start of World War II. The atoll, together with other parts of Marshall Islands located to the west of 164°E, was placed under the governance of Pohnpei district during the Japanese administration period, separately from the rest of the Marshall Islands.

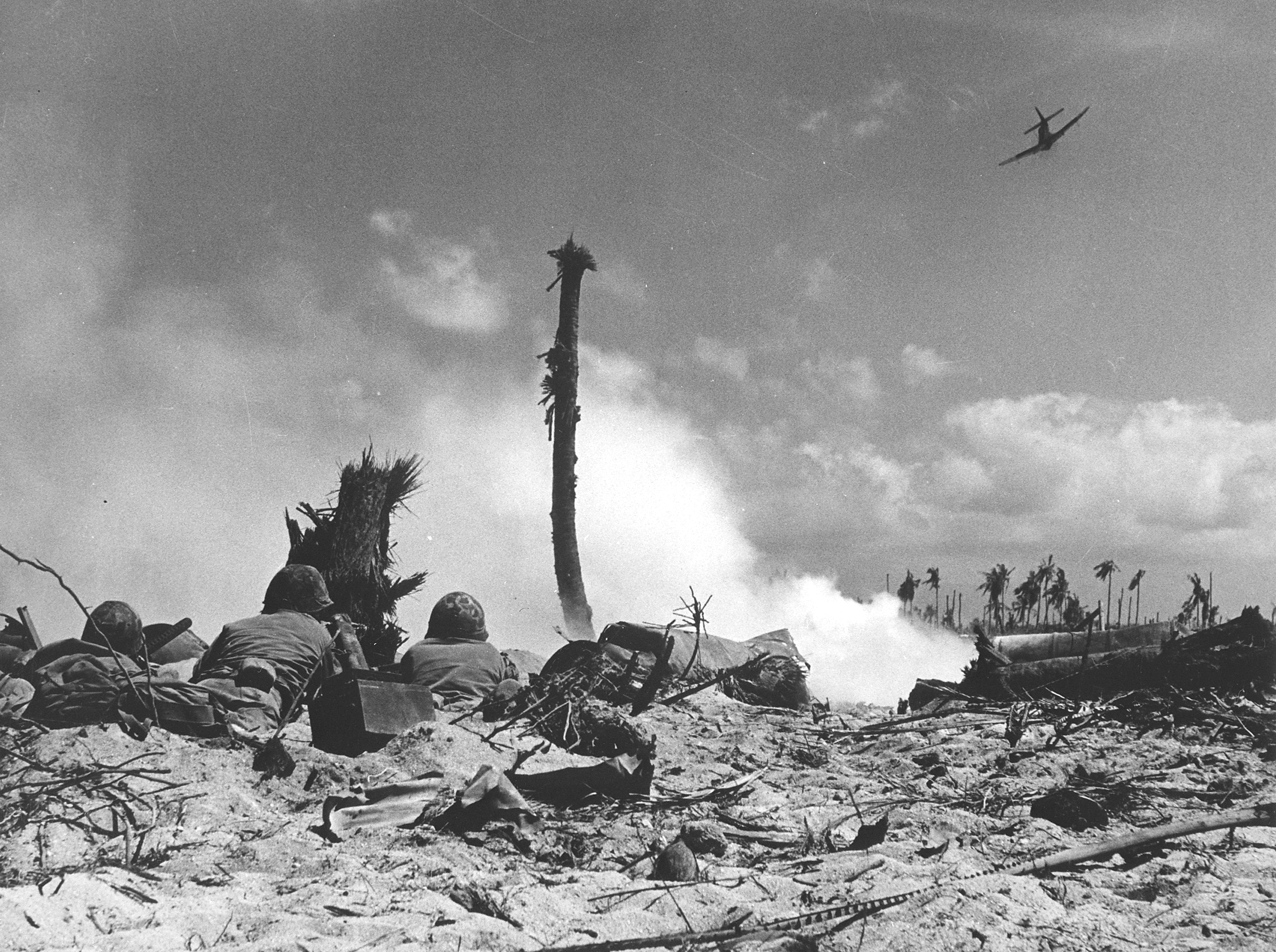
Fighting on Enewetak Atoll during the Battle of Eniwetok in World War II

In November 1942, the Japanese built an airfield on Engebi Island. As they used it only for refueling planes between Truk and islands to the east, no aviation personnel were stationed there, and the island had only token defenses. When the Gilberts fell to the United States, the Imperial Japanese Army assigned defense of the atoll to the 1st Amphibious Brigade, formed from the 3rd Independent Garrison, which had previously been stationed in Manchukuo. The 1st Amphibious Brigade arrived on January 4, 1944. Some 2,586 of its 3,940 men were left to defend Eniwetok Atoll, supplemented by aviation personnel, civilian employees, and laborers. However, they were unable to finish the fortifications before the American attack came in February. During the ensuing Battle of Eniwetok, the Americans captured Enewetak in a five-day amphibious operation. Fighting mainly took place on Engebi Islet, site of the most important Japanese installation, although some combat occurred on the main islet of Enewetak itself and on Parry Island, where there was a Japanese seaplane base.

Following its capture, the anchorage at Enewetok became a major US Naval Advance Base with Service Squadron 4 and Service Squadron 10 stationed in the lagoon. The daily average of ships present during the first half of July 1944 was 488; during the second half of July, the daily average number of ships at Enewetak was 283. Naval Base Eniwetok was part of the vast Naval Base Marshall Islands. US Navy Seabees of the 110th Naval Construction Battalion arrived on February 21 and 27 to begin construction of Stickell Field. It had two taxiways and a 6,800-by-400-foot (2,070 by 120 m) runway. In June 1945, the 67th CB arrived to build a 35,000 man recreation center to be turned over to CBMU 608.

In 1950, John C. Woods, who executed the Nazi war criminals convicted at the Nuremberg trials, died by accidental electrocution while stationed on Enewetak Atoll.

=== Nuclear weapons testing ===
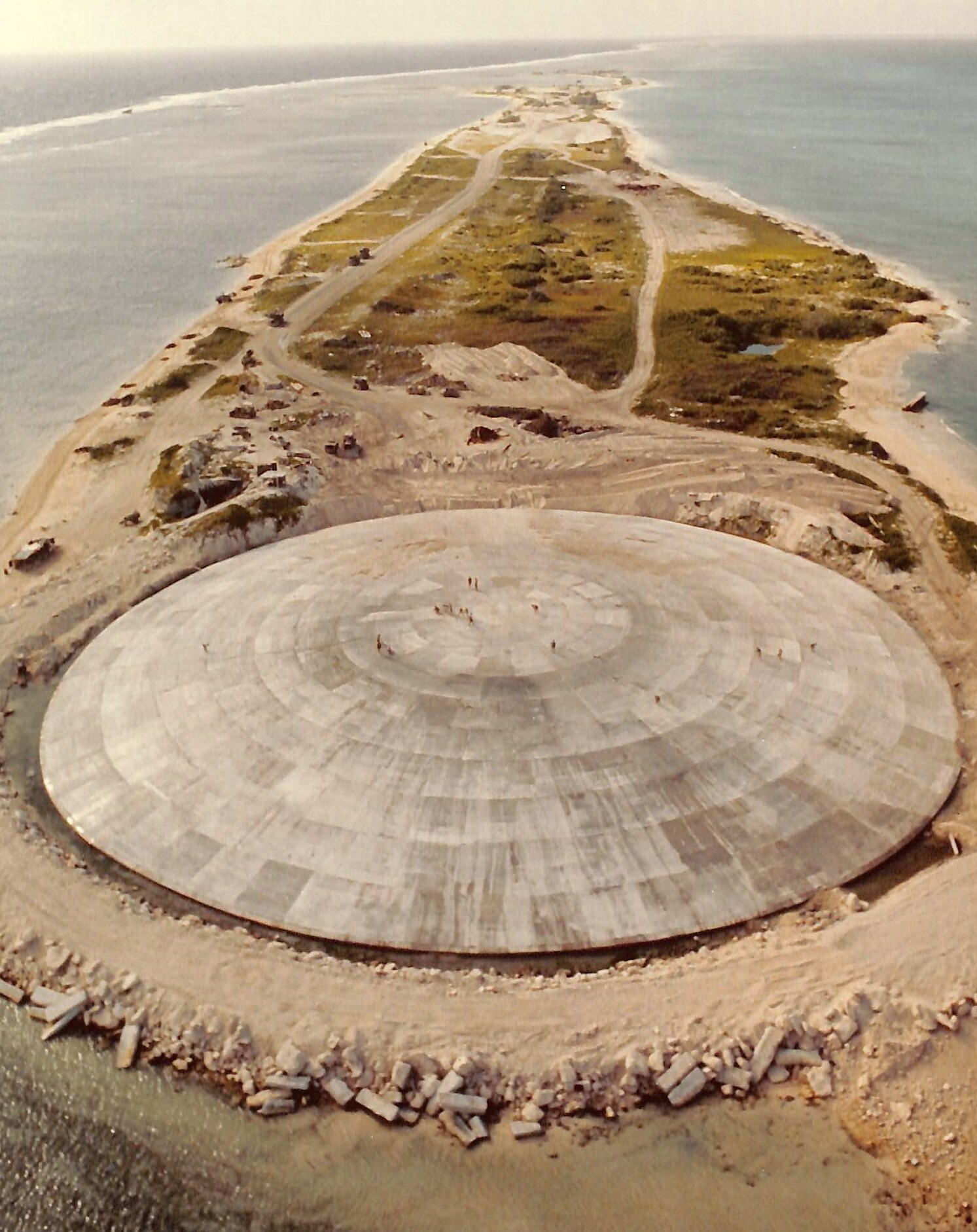
Aerial view of the Runit Dome. The dome is placed in the crater created by the "Cactus" nuclear weapons test in 1958.

After the end of World War II, Enewetak came under the control of the United States as part of the Trust Territory of the Pacific Islands, until the independence of the Marshall Islands in 1986. During its tenure, the United States evacuated the local residents many times, often involuntarily. The atoll was used for nuclear testing, as part of the Pacific Proving Grounds. Before testing commenced, the U.S. exhumed the bodies of United States servicemen killed in the Battle of Enewetak and returned them to the United States to be re-buried by their families. Forty-three (Note: There is a discrepancy related to the total number of tests conducted: 42 or 43. The total number is 43, but two tests (HARDTACK I SCAEVOLA and HARDTACK I QUINCE) were of zero yield: one was a safety test and the other was a failure. And sometimes one of them is not counted. Another source of this discrepancy is the widely cited article by Simon and Robison, the summary of which lists the total number of tests conducted at Enewetak Atoll as 42 (including two tests with zero yield), although the attached table lists data for all 43 tests.) nuclear tests were fired at Enewetak from 1948 to 1958.

The first hydrogen bomb test, code-named Ivy Mike, occurred in late 1952 as part of Operation Ivy; it vaporized the islet of Elugelab and created two new elements: Fermium and Einsteinium. This test included B-17 Flying Fortress drones to fly through the radioactive cloud to test onboard samples. B-17 mother ships controlled the drones while flying within visual distance of them. In all, 16 to 20 B-17s took part in this operation, of which half were controlling aircraft and half were drones. To examine the explosion clouds of the nuclear bombs in 1957/58, several rockets (mostly from rockoons) were launched. One USAF airman, Jimmy Robinson, was lost at sea during the tests. Robinson's F-84 Thunderjet crashed and sank 3.5 miles (5.6 km) short of the island. Robinson's body was never recovered.

=== Radiological cleanup ===
A radiological survey of Enewetak was conducted from 1972 to 1973. In 1977, the United States military began decontamination of Enewetak and other islands. During the three-year, US$100 million cleanup process, the military mixed more than 80,000 cubic meters (100,000 cu yd) of contaminated soil and debris from the islands with Portland cement and buried it in an atomic blast crater on the northern end of the atoll's Runit Island. (Note: A 15 kiloton nuclear weapon exploded but did not undergo nuclear fission on Runit, scattering plutonium over the island. Runit Island is not habitable for the next 24,000 years, which is why it was chosen for the nuclear waste repository. See: Wargo, John. Green Intelligence: Creating Environments That Protect Human Health. New Haven, Conn.: Yale University Press, 2009, p. 15.) The material was placed in the 9.1-meter (30 ft) deep, 110-meter (360 ft) wide crater created by the May 5, 1958, "Cactus" nuclear weapons test. A dome composed of 358 concrete panels, each 46 centimeters (18 in) thick, was constructed over the material. The final cost of the cleanup project was US$239 million. The United States government declared the southern and western islands in the atoll safe for habitation in 1980, (Note: The government said that the northern islands would not be safe for inhabitation until 2010. See: Johnson, Bulletin of the Atomic Scientists, p. 25.) and residents of Enewetak returned that same year. The military members who participated in that cleanup mission are suffering from many health issues, but the U.S. Government refused to provide health coverage until 2022 with the passage of the Honoring our PACT Act.

The 2000 environmental restoration award included funds for additional cleanup of radioactivity on Enewetak. Rather than scrape the topsoil off, replace it with clean topsoil, and create another radioactive waste repository dome at some site on the atoll (a project estimated to cost US$947 million), most areas still contaminated on Enewetak were treated with potassium. (Note: Cesium, which is highly radioactive, is chemically similar to potassium. Since the atoll is deficient in potassium, plants absorb cesium from the ground instead. This makes the plants inedible. Cesium also is deposited in the muscles of the human body, just as potassium is. See: Firth, Stewart (1987). Nuclear Playground. Honolulu: University of Hawaii Press. p. 36. ISBN 0824811445.) Soil that could not be effectively treated for human use was removed and used as fill for a causeway connecting the two main islands of the atoll (Enewetak and Parry). The cost of the potassium decontamination project was US$103.3 million.

A report by the US Congressional Research Service projects that the majority of the atoll will be fit for human habitation by 2026–2027, after nuclear decay, de-contamination and environmental remediation efforts create sufficient dose reductions. However, in November 2017, the Australian Broadcasting Corporation reported that rising sea levels caused by climate change are seeping inside the dome, causing radioactive material to leak out.

=== U.S. relations with Marshall Islands ===
Section 177 of the 1983 Compact of Free Association between the governments of the United States and the Marshall Islands establishes a process for Marshallese to make a claim against the United States government as a result of damage and injury caused by nuclear testing. That same year, an agreement was signed to implement Section 177, which established a US$150 million trust fund. The fund was intended to generate US$18 million a year, which would be payable to claimants on an agreed-upon schedule. If the US$18 million a year generated by the fund was not enough to cover claims, the principal of the fund could be used. A Marshall Islands Nuclear Claims Tribunal was established to adjudicate claims. In 2000, the tribunal made a compensation award to the people of Enewetak consisting of US$107.8 million for environmental restoration; US$244 million in damages to cover economic losses caused by loss of access and use of the atoll; and US$34 million for hardship and suffering. In addition, as of the end of 2008, another US$96.658 million in individual damage awards were made. Only US$73.526 million of the individual claims award has been paid, however, and no new awards were made between the end of 2008 and May 2010. Due to stock market losses, payments rates that have outstripped fund income, and other issues, the fund was nearly exhausted, as of May 2010, and unable to make any additional awards or payments. A lawsuit by Marshallese arguing that "changed circumstances" made Nuclear Claims Tribunal unable to make just compensation was dismissed by the Supreme Court of the United States in April 2010.

== Education ==
Marshall Islands Public School System operates Enewetak Elementary School. Marshall Islands High School on Majuro serves the community.

== Eniwetok Airfield ==
Men from the 110th Naval Construction Battalion arrived on Eniwetok between 21 and 27 February 1944 and began clearing the island for construction of a bomber airfield. A 2,100-meter (6,900 ft) by 120-meter (390 ft) runway with taxiways and supporting facilities was built. The first plane landed on 11 March. By 5 April the first operational bombing mission was conducted. The base was later named for Lieutenant John H. Stickell.

In mid-September 1944 operations at Wrigley Airfield on Engebi Island were transferred to Eniwetok.

US Navy and Marine units based at Eniwetok included:

- VB-102 operating PB4Y-1s from 12 to 27 August 1944
- VB-108 operating PB4Y-1s from 11 April to 10 July 1944
- VB-109 operating PB4Y-1s from 5 April to 14 August 1944
- VB-116 operating PB4Y-1s from 7 July to 27 August 1944
- VPB-121 operating PB4Y-1s from 1 March to 3 July 1945
- VPB-144 operating PV-2s from 27 June 1945 to September 1946

The airstrip is now abandoned and its surface partially covered by sand.

== Parry Island seaplane base ==
The Imperial Japanese Navy had developed a seaplane base on Parry Island. Following its capture on 22 February, Seabees from the 110th Naval Construction Battalion expanded the base, building a coral-surfaced parking area and shops for minor aircraft and engine overhaul. A marine ways was installed on a Japanese pier and boat-repair shops were also erected.

US Navy and Marine units based at Parry Island included:

- VP-13 operating PB2Y-3s from 26 February to 22 June 1944
- VP-16 operating PBM-3Ds from 7 June to 1 August 1944
- VP-21 operating PBM-3Ds from 19 August to 17 October 1944 and from 15 July to 11 September 1945
- VP-23 operating PBY-5As from 20 August 1944 to 9 April 1945
- VP-MS-6 operating PBM-5Es from 1 February 1948 in support of Operation Sandstone
- VP-102 operating PB2Y-3s from 3 February to 30 August 1944
- VP-202 operating PBM-3Ds from 24 February to 1 March 1944
- VPB-19 operating PBM-3Ds from 2 November 1944 to 12 February 1945 and 6 March 1945 to January 1946
- VPB-22 operating PBM-3Ds from 10 October to 30 November 1944 and from 25 June to 7 August 1945

== List of nuclear weapons tests at Eniwetok ==
=== Summary ===
Nuclear Tests on and around Enewetak Atoll
Series	Start date	End date	Count	Yield Range	Total Yield
Sandstone	14 April 1948	14 May 1948	3	18 - 49 kilotons	104 kilotons
Greenhouse	7 April 1951	4 May 1951	4	45.5-225 kilotons	396.5 kilotons
Ivy	31 October 1952	15 November 1952	2	500 kilotons - 10.4 megatons	10.9 megatons
Castle	13 May 1954	13 May 1954	1	110 kilotons - 15 megatons	48 megatons
Redwing	4 May 1956	21 July 1956	11	190 tons - 1.9 megatons	~2.61 megatons
Hardtack I	5 April 1958	18 August 1958	22	Zero - 8.9 megatons	16.1 megatons
Total (on Enewetak)			43		Approx 31.8 megatons (almost 6% of total test yield worldwide)

=== Operation Sandstone ===
Test shot	Date	Location	Yield
X-Ray	18:17 14 April 1948 (GMT)	Enjebi Islet	37 kt
Yoke	18:09 30 April 1948 (GMT)	Aomon Islet	49 kt
Zebra	18:04 14 May 1948 (GMT)	Runit Islet	18 kt

=== Operation Greenhouse ===
Test shot	Date	Location	Yield
Dog	18:34 7 April 1951 (GMT)	Runit Islet	81 kt
Easy	18:26 20 April 1951 (GMT)	Enjebi Islet	47 kt
George	21:30 8 May 1951 (GMT)	Eberiru Islet	225 kt
Item	18:17 24 May 1951 (GMT)	Enjebi Islet	45.5 kt

=== Operation Ivy ===
Test shot	Date	Location	Yield
Mike	19:14:59.4 31 October 1952 (GMT)	Elugelab Islet	10.4 Mt
King	23:30 15 November 1952 (GMT)	Runit Islet	500 kt

=== Operation Castle ===
Test shot	Date	Location	Yield
Nectar	18:00 13 May 1954 UTC	Off Bogon Islet near Ivy Mike crater	1.69 Mt

=== Operation Redwing ===
Test shot	Date	Location	Yield
Lacrosse	18:25 4 May 1956 (GMT)	Runit Islet	40 kt
Yuma	19:56 27 May 1956 (GMT)	Aomon Islet	0.19 kt
Erie	18:15 30 May 1956 (GMT)	Runit Islet	14.9 kt
Seminole	00:55 6 June 1956 (GMT)	Bogon Islet	13.7 kt
Blackfoot	18:26 11 June 1956 (GMT)	Runit Islet	8 kt
Kickapoo	23:26 13 June 1956 (GMT)	Aomon Islet	1.49 kt
Osage	01:14 16 June 1956 (GMT)	Runit Islet	1.7 kt
Inca	21:26 21 June 1956 (GMT)	Rujoru Islet	15.2 kt
Mohawk	18:06 2 July 1956 (GMT)	Eberiru Islet	360 kt
Apache	18:06 8 July 1956 (GMT)	near Ivy Mike crater	1.9 Mt
Huron	18:12 21 July 1956 (GMT)	Off Flora Islet	250 kt

=== Operation Hardtack I ===
Test shot	Date	Location	Yield
Yucca	18:15 28 April 1958 (GMT)	157 km N of Eniwetok Atoll (Note: The Hardtack I Yucca test was conducted using a stratospheric balloon. The ship with this balloon departed from Bikini Atoll. The launch of this balloon was made between Enewetak and Bikini Atolls, slightly closer to Bikini. The surface zero was closer to Enewetak Atoll. Therefore this test can only be conditionally classified as a test performed at Enewetak Atoll.)	1.7 kt
Cactus	18:15 5 May 1958 (GMT)	Runit Islet	18 kt
Butternut	18:15 11 May 1958 (GMT)	Eniwetok Atoll	81 kt
Koa	18:30 12 May 1958 (GMT)	Eniwetok Atoll	1370 kt
Wahoo	01:30 16 May 1958 (GMT)	Eniwetok Atoll	9 kt
Holly	18:30 20 May 1958 (GMT)	Eniwetok Atoll	5.9 kt
Yellowwood	2:00 26 May 1958 (GMT)	Eniwetok Lagoon	330 kt
Magnolia	18:00 26 May 1958 (GMT)	Eniwetok Atoll	57 kt
Tobacco	02:50 30 May 1958 (GMT)	Eniwetok Atoll	11.6 kt
Rose	18:45 2 June 1958 (GMT)	Eniwetok Atoll	15 kt
Umbrella	23:15 8 June 1958 (GMT)	Eniwetok Lagoon	8 kt
Walnut	18:30 14 June 1958 (GMT)	Eniwetok Atoll	1.45 kt
Linden	03:00 18 June 1958 (GMT)	Eniwetok Atoll	11 kt
Elder	18:30 27 June 1958 (GMT)	Eniwetok Atoll	880 kt
Oak	19:30 28 June 1958 (GMT)	Eniwetok Lagoon	8.9 Mt
Sequoia	18:30 1 July 1958 (GMT)	Eniwetok Atoll	5.2 kt
Dogwood	18:30 5 July 1958 (GMT)	Eniwetok Atoll	397 kt
Scaevola	04:00 14 July 1958 (GMT)	Eniwetok Atoll	0 kt
Pisonia	23:00 17 July 1958 (GMT)	Eniwetok Atoll	255 kt
Olive	18:15 22 July 1958 (GMT)	Eniwetok Atoll	202 kt
Pine	20:30 26 July 1958 (GMT)	Eniwetok Atoll	2000 kt
Quince	02:15 6 August 1958 (GMT)	Eniwetok Atoll	0 kt
Fig	04:00 18 August 1958 (GMT)	Eniwetok Atoll	0.02 kt

=== Gallery ===
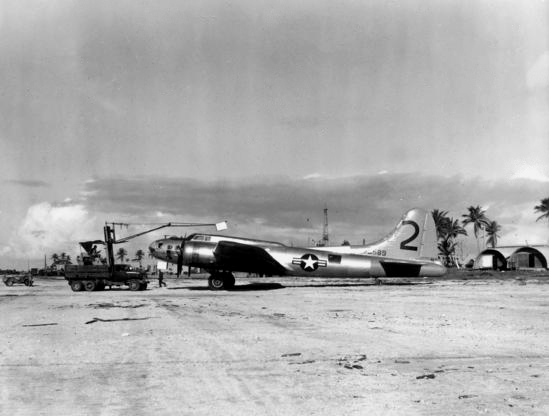
USAF Boeing B-17 Flying Fortress drone aircraft at Eniwetok Airfield in 1948 for Operation Sandstone nuclear test

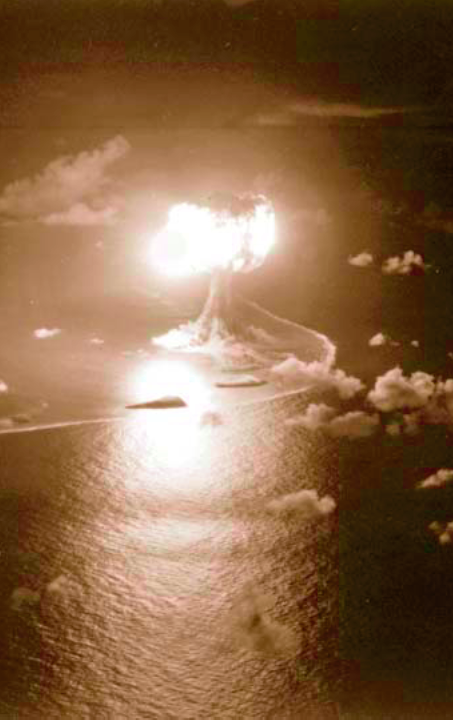
Operation Sandstone nuclear test

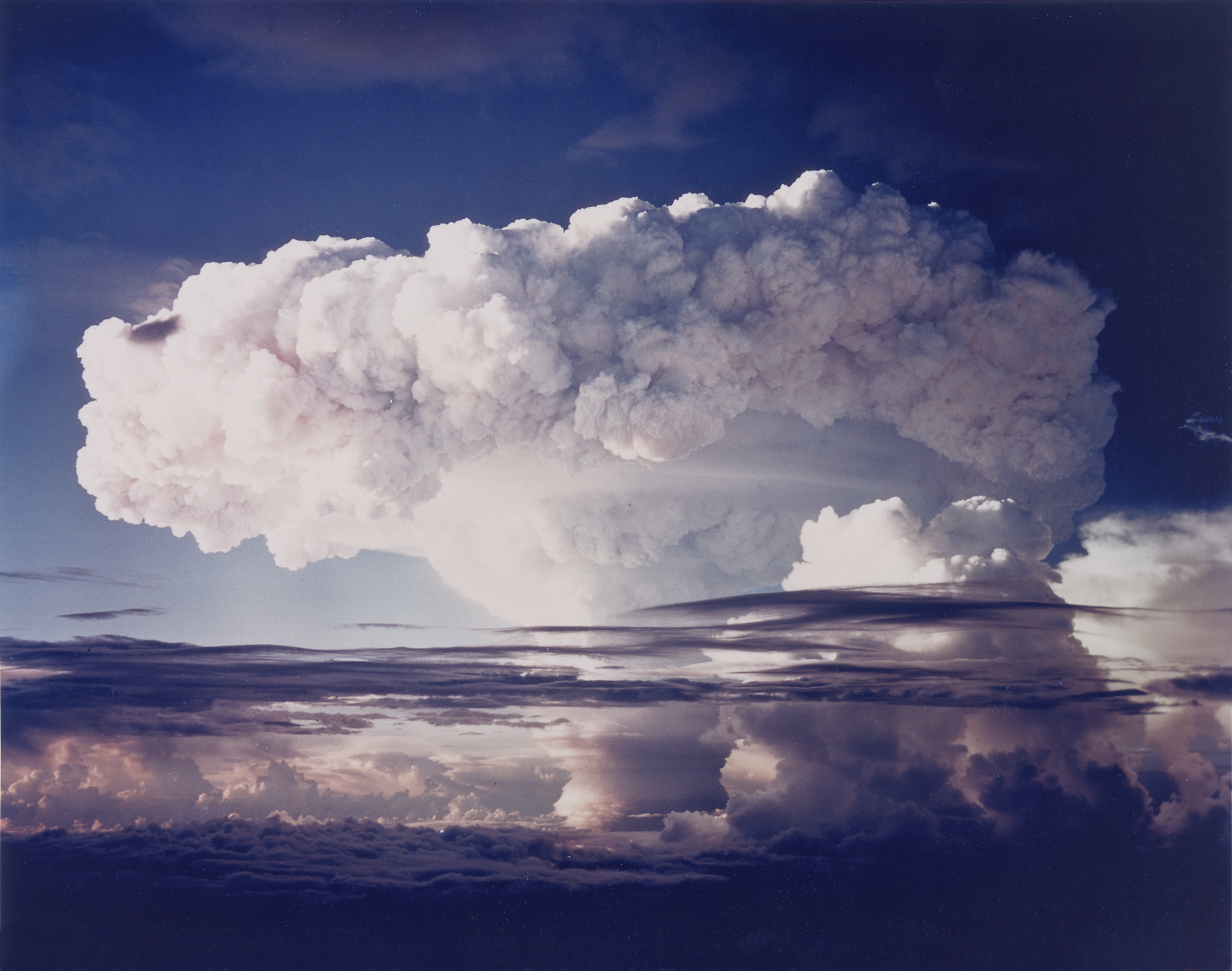
Ivy Mike thermonuclear test, 31 October, 1952

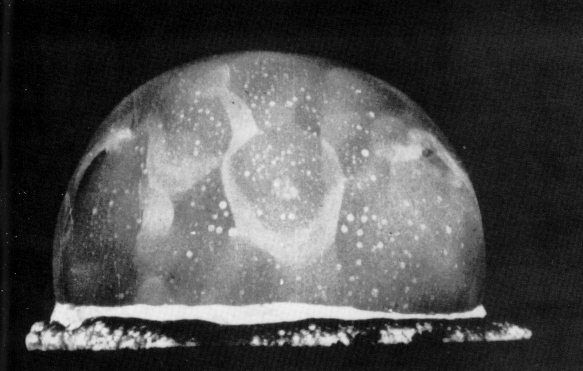
Operation Greenhouse nuclear test

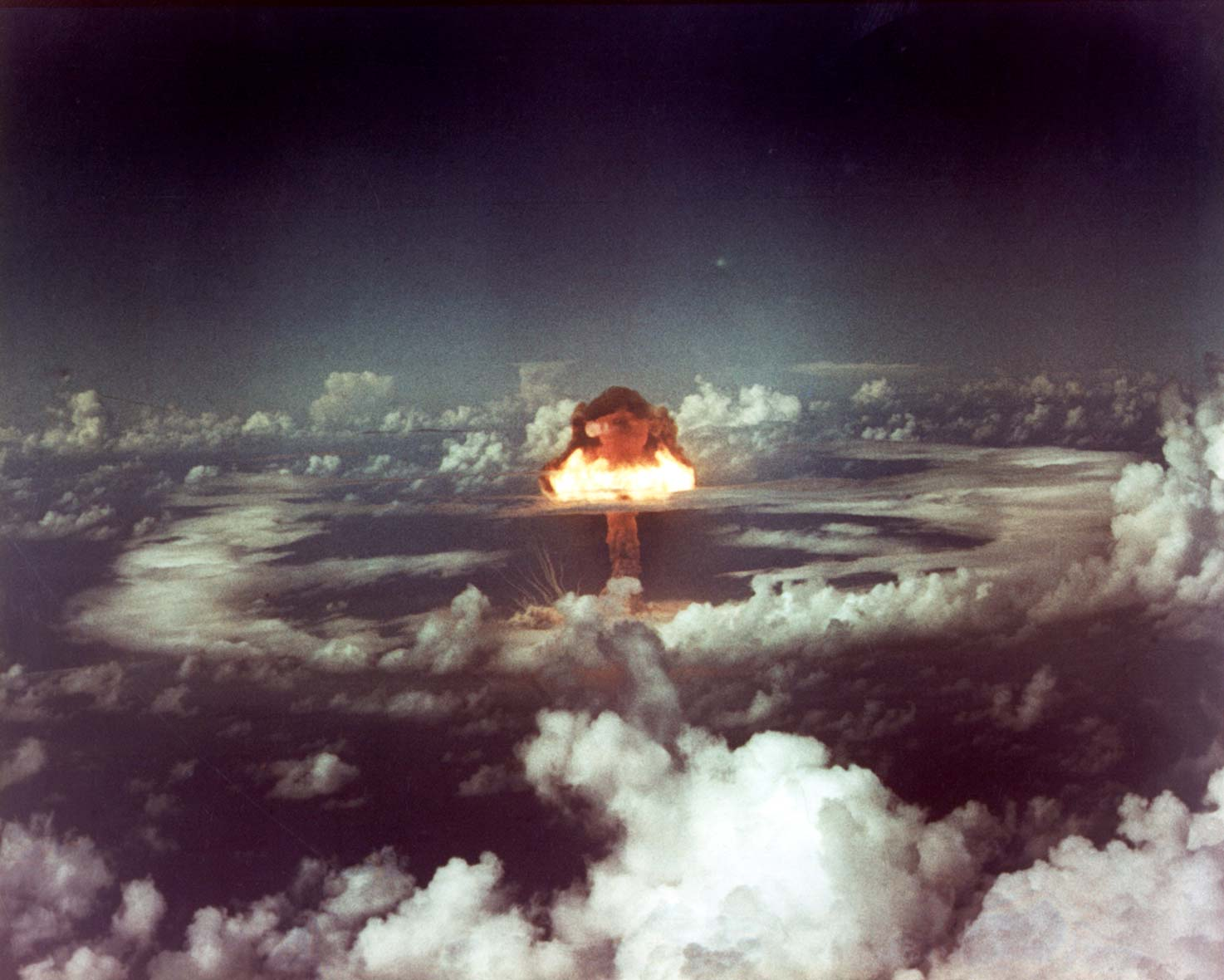
Ivy King largest pure fission nuclear test, conducted by the US in November 1952

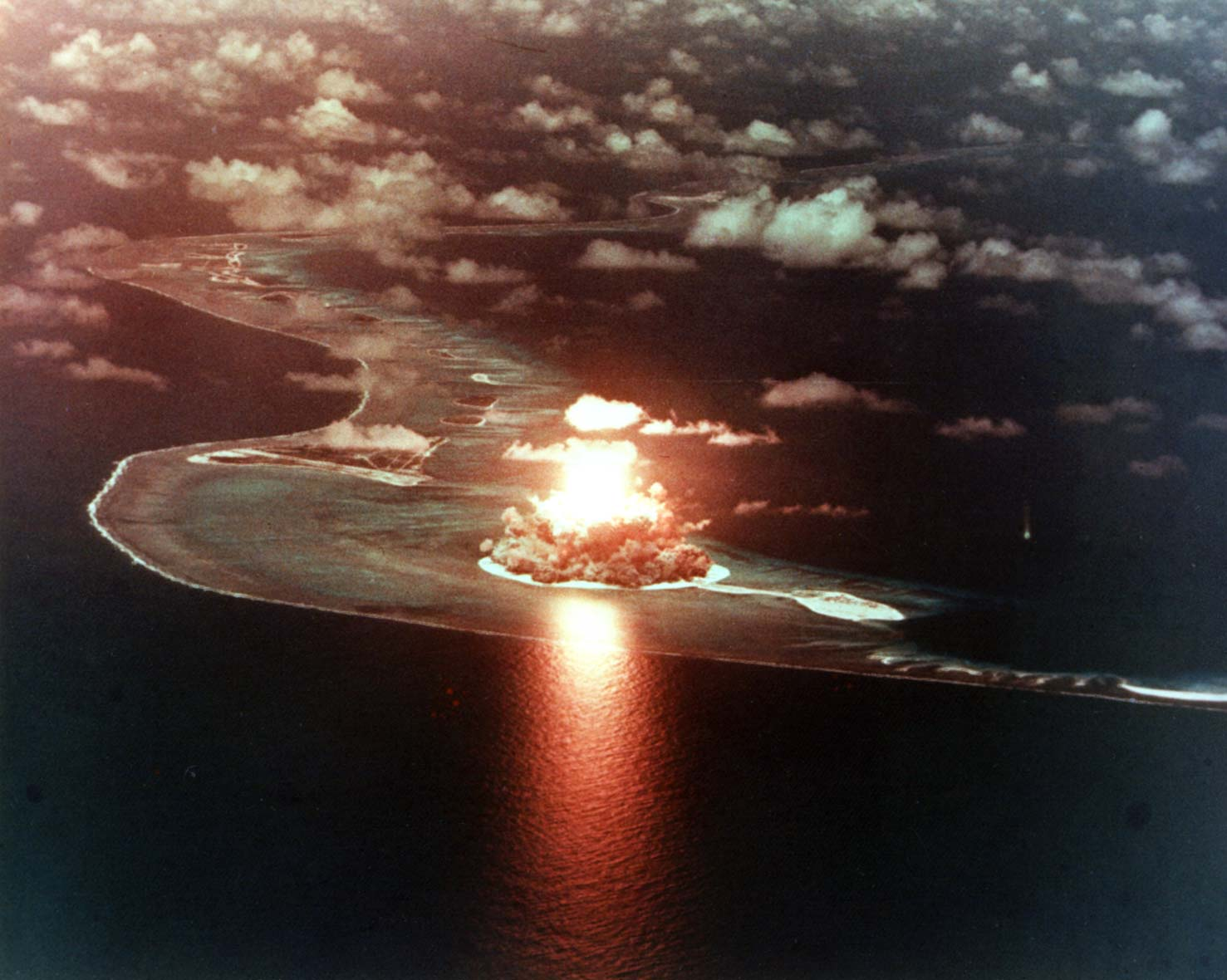
Test shot Seminole of Operation Redwing, conducted on the coast of the island of Bogon

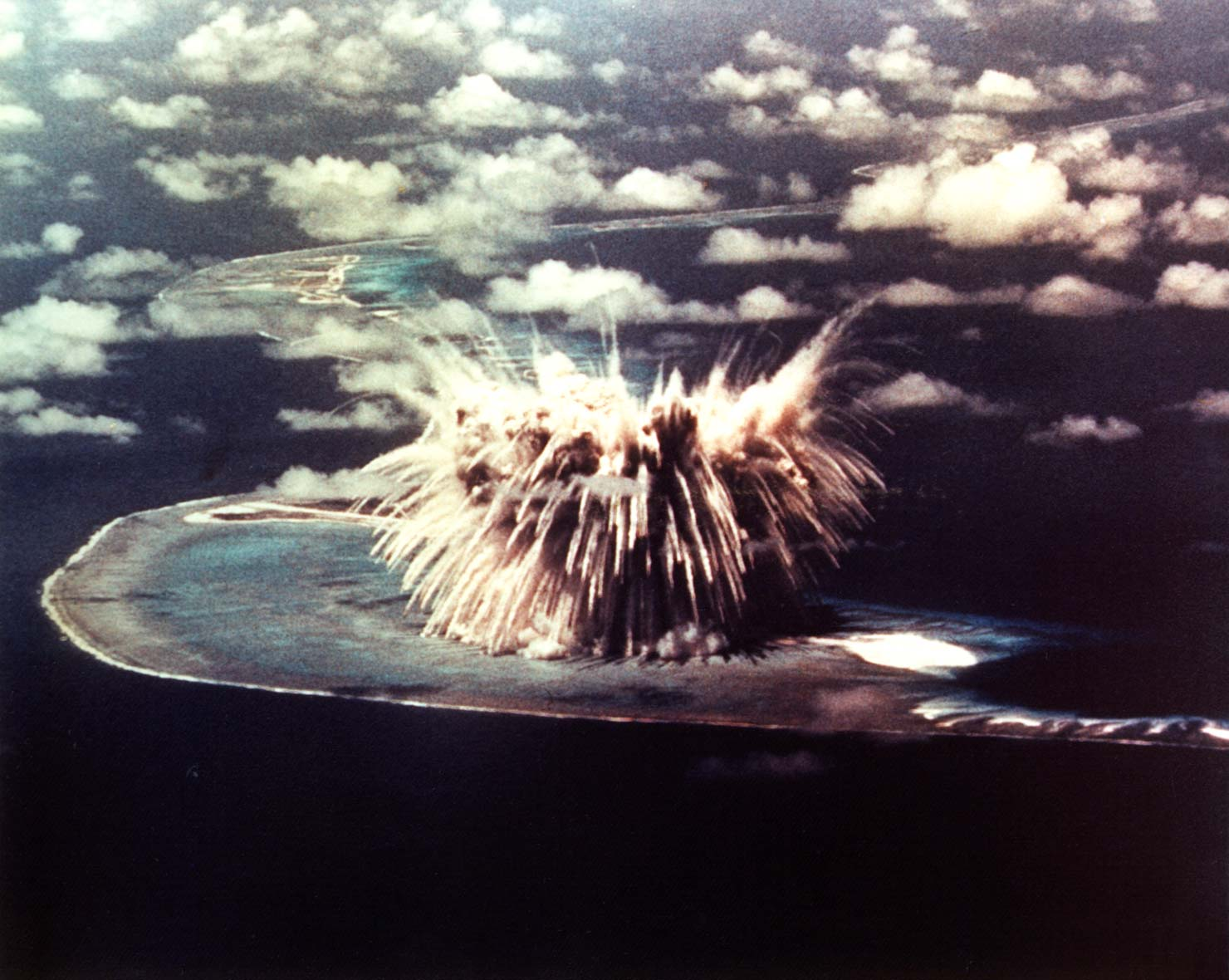
Red-wing Seminole nuclear test

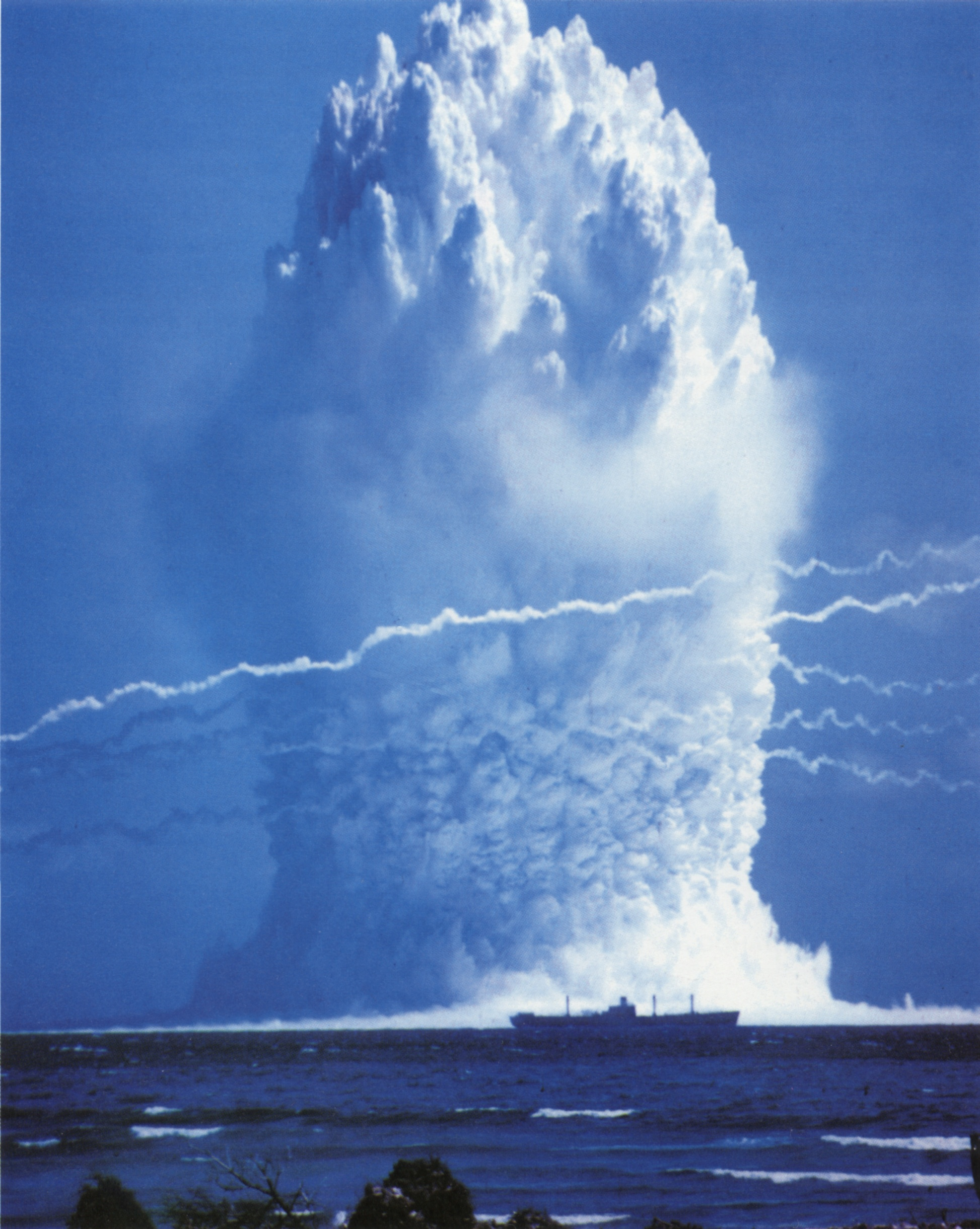
Hardtack Umbrella nuclear test

Video clips of three test nuclear explosions in Eniwetok, Marshall Islands

Test shot Nectar of Operation Castle produced a yield of 1.69 megatons and was detonated just north east of Ivy Mike's Elugelab crater. The Island of Bogon is the spearhead shaped object at the bottom right of the screen, as it was before the Redwing Seminole test was conducted on that island.

== Missile Impact Location System ==
From 1958 through 1960 the United States installed the Missile Impact Location System (MILS) in the Navy-managed Pacific Missile Range, later the Air Force–managed Western Range, to localize the splashdowns of test missile nose cones. MILS was developed and installed by the same entities that had completed the first phase of the Atlantic and U.S. West Coast SOSUS systems. A MILS installation, consisting of both a target array for precision location and a broad ocean area system for good positions outside the target area, was installed at Eniwetok as part of the system supporting intercontinental ballistic missile (ICBM) tests. Other Pacific MILS shore terminals were at the Marine Corps Air Station Kaneohe Bay supporting intermediate-range ballistic missile (IRBM) tests with impact areas northeast of Hawaii and the other ICBM test support systems at Midway Island and Wake Island.

== In popular culture ==
- The short story "The Terminal Beach" by J. G. Ballard is set on an island of Eniwetok in the aftermath of the nuclear tests.

== Bibliography ==
- Ballard, J. G. (1964). The Terminal Beach. Carroll and Graf. The Terminal Beach at Google Books; reprint (1997): ISBN 0-88184-370-9.
- Bureau of Yards and Docks (1947). Building the Navy's Bases in World War II: History of the Bureau of Yards and Docks and the Civil Engineer Corps, 1940–1946. U.S. Department of the Navy; U.S. Government Printing Office.
- Hezel, Francis X. (1994) [1983]. The First Taint of Civilization: A History of the Caroline and Marshall Islands in Pre-colonial Days, 1521–1885. University of Hawaii Press. ISBN 978-0-8248-1643-8.
- Roberts, Michael D. (2000). Dictionary of American Naval Aviation Squadrons. Vol. 2: The History of VP, VPB, VP(H) and VP(AM) Squadrons. Washington, D.C.: Naval Historical Center, Department of the Navy.

Attribution
