= Marshall Islands Nuclear Claims Tribunal =

Marshallese-American international arbitral tribunal

Marshall Islands Nuclear Claims Tribunal is an international arbitral tribunal established pursuant to the Agreement Between the Government of the United States and the Government of the Marshall Islands for the Implementation of Section 177 of the Compact of Free Association (also known as 177 Agreement). The Claims Tribunal has the "jurisdiction to render final determination upon all claims past, present and future, of the Government, citizens and nationals of the Marshall Islands which are based on, arise out of, or are in any way related to the [American] Nuclear Testing Program."

It was established in 1988. (Note: The creation date varies in some sources. The NCT was first described by the Compact of Free Association that was signed by negotiators in 1982, approved by MI plebiscite in 1983 and signed into law in US in 1986. The NCT was finally established by RMI legislation in 1987 and became operational in 1988. Its own webpage stated that "Nuclear Claims Tribunal was established in 1988".) It has effectively ceased functioning around 2011, having run out of funds a few years earlier, with the United States government, which originally funded it, declining to provide it with additional resources.

== Background ==
The Wilson cloud from test Baker, situated just offshore from Bikini Island at top of the picture.

From June 30, 1946, to August 18, 1958, the United States detonated sixty-seven nuclear bombs with a total yield of 109 megatons of TNT (460 PJ) on the Bikini Atoll and Enewet Atoll of the Marshall Islands, resulting in significant damage to the atolls and nearby areas. From 1981, several cases were brought by Marshall Islands inhabitants in front of the United States Court of Claims. Following the signing of the Compact of Free Association between the US and MI governments, the Republic of the Marshall Islands (RMI) agreed to "espouse and dismiss" the private damages claims of its citizens that were in front of the US Court of Claims in exchange for the US government establishment of $150 million trust fund for settlement of all claims which was to be used to compensate the affected Marshallese citizens over time. In addition, the agreement indemnified the parties and the government shall use the fund such that "The amount of such indemnification shall not, in the aggregate, exceed $150 million".

== Composition ==
The Tribunal consisted of three members, a chairman and two other members, all appointed by the RMI government. The Tribunal had several officers, including a public advocate, a defender of the fund, a financial officer, and a clerk, nominated by the chairman and appointed by the Tribunal.

== Activities ==
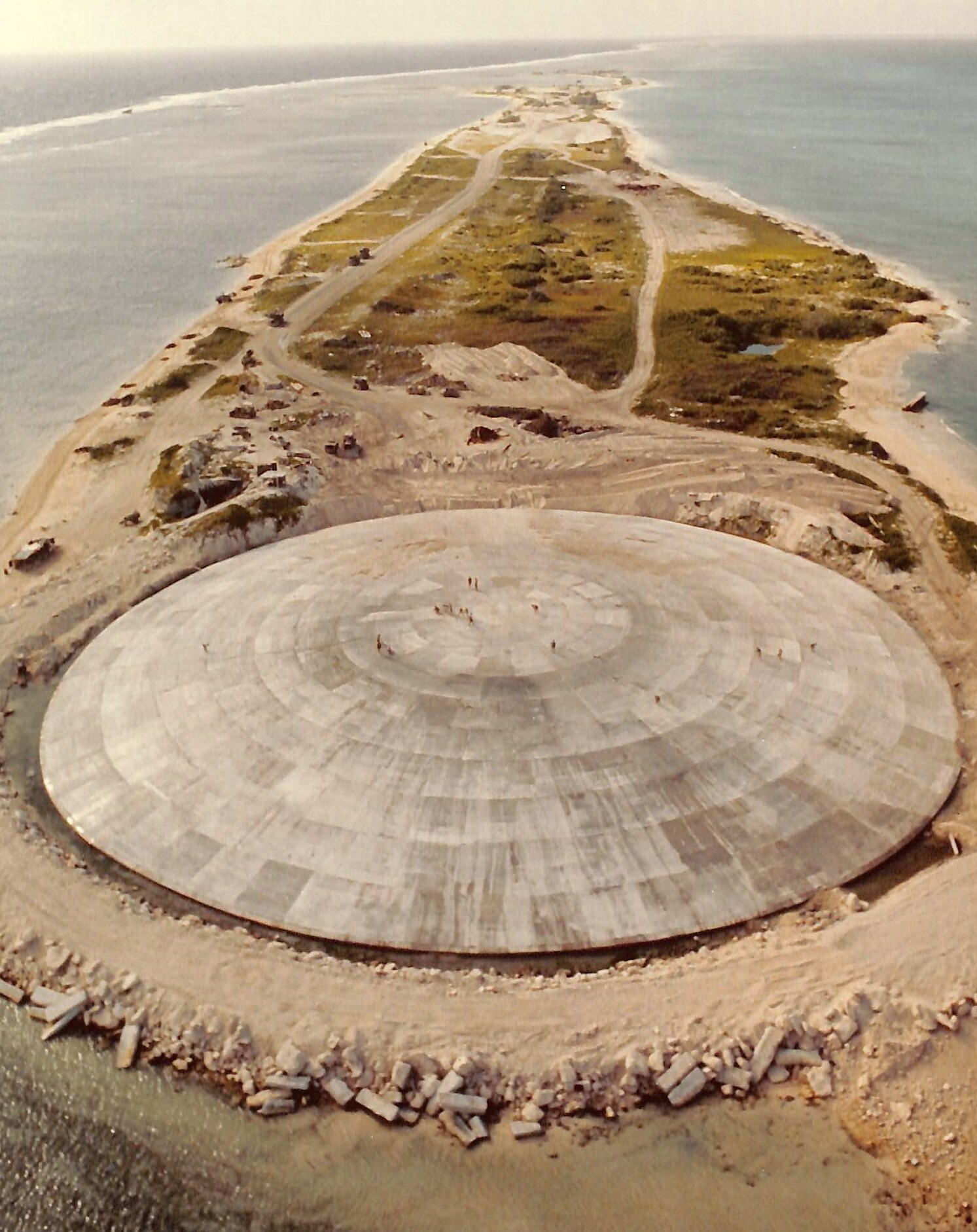
Aerial view of the Runit Dome in the Enewetak Atoll. The dome is placed in the crater created by the "Cactus" nuclear weapons test in 1958.

=== History ===
To process those claims, an independent Nuclear Claims Tribunal was established in the Marshalls Islands following the passage of the Nuclear Claims Tribunal Act in 1987 by the Marshall Islands legislature; the tribunal became active in 1988, with the appointment of its first chairman, Bruce Piggott of Australia. The first years of the tribunal were "marked by controversy, tension and periodic inactivity as members of the Nitijela quarreled with the first Members of the Tribunal about how the Tribunal should conduct its business".

Major cases the tribunal heard include five class-action claims: the Enewetak Class Action (1990–2000, over $300 million awarded); Utirik and Rongelap (both started in 1991, awarded over $300 million in 2006 and over $1 billion 2006 respectively); and Bikini (1993–2001, over $563 million awarded). The fifth class-action claim filed on behalf of the Ailuk Atoll was opened in the mid-2000s as well. The tribunal also awarded personal injury awards of over $90m as of 2006.

The $150 million fund was designed to generate interest to allow for payouts exceeding its initial value. It was, however, subject to normal market economics, and its growth was not steady; it incurred a significant loss in the Black Monday stock market crash of 1987–1988, for example. The fund was able to generate and distribute at least $270 million worth of compensation.

Nonetheless, in 1997 the tribunal noted that the funds received from US in the 1980s were inadequate, and by 2000 the RMI Government concurred that the trust fund had become "manifestly inadequate" to provide the compensation the Section 177 of the Compact of Free Association promised. On September 11, 2000, it filed a petition with the US Congress seeking further compensation from the United States under the "Changed Circumstances" provision of the Section 177. By that time, the US had already approved compensation claims of more than $562 million under the Radiation Exposure Compensation Act by persons injured as a result of nuclear tests in Nevada that the Kirkpatrick & Lockhart LLP report of 2003 noted "were much smaller in number and magnitude than the tests conducted in the Marshall Islands". The 2000 RMI request to the US Congress was rejected with the statement that the submission was not the ‘changed circumstances” contemplated by the agreement. Some have described this as "ignored", and the tribunal has exhausted its funds, unable to pay remaining claimants by 2009, at which time it had awarded more than $2 billion for personal injury, property loss, and class-action claims, with much of that amount not paid to the claimants because of the lack of funds. The United States Court of Federal Claims has rejected a claim from some Marshall Islands inhabitants, noting that the respective governments had already reached an agreement over claims, though also noting that the claimants can seek additional compensation from the US Congress. Facing the reduction of its available funds, the Tribunal has been forced to limit its payments; noting that "For the first nine months of 2006, an initial payment was made in the amount of 15% of each new or amended award. Effective October 1, 2006, the initial payment level was reduced to 5% of the amount of the compensation awarded." By the mid-2010s, about half of the valid claimants had died waiting for their compensation.

The issue was discussed by the United States House Foreign Affairs Subcommittee on Asia and the Pacific regarding the commitments of the United States to address the impacts of U.S. nuclear testing in the Marshall Islands. Speakers noted that while section 177 of the Compact of Free Association recognized the United States' responsibility "to address past, present and future consequences of the nuclear testing claims", they described less than $4 million was awarded [the actual number was higher] and the other $2.2 billion judgments rendered by a Nuclear Claims Tribunal created under the RMI Compact were not supported. The United States Court of Claims had dismissed two lawsuits to enforce the judgement. With respect to these unaddressed claims, medical practitioners also noted the potential widespread impacts of nuclear testing within the Pacific Proving Grounds, indicated by the prevalence of radiogenic diseases as well as heart disease, diabetes, and obesity associated with "[a] forced changed in dietary patterns and lifestyle" resulting from U.S. administration after the testing.

=== Present day ===
The tribunal effectively ceased functioning around 2011 with a 2012 media report noting that "there have been no judges employed by the Tribunal for more than a year, and although the Tribunal remains open, it is now staffed only on a part-time basis". The official webpage of the NCT went offline in mid-2014. A 2015 news report noted that the office of the Tribunal was still semi-functional around that time, "the rent being paid by the Marshallese government in order to keep it open as a record of unpaid claims. Stacks of uncompensated claims could be seen in boxes piled high around the office."

The only avenue for further action according to the agreement, is to make requests of the U.S. Congress for further funds. It is now a political question based on the moral question of responsibility.

== See also ==
- Iran–United States Claims Tribunal
