= Ivy Mike =

1952 American nuclear bomb test

Coordinates: 11°40′0″N 162°11′13″E

- Detonation and subsequent mushroom cloud of the "Mike" shot (time-lapse).

Information
- Country: United States; Marshall Islands
- Test series: Operation Ivy
- Test site: Enewetak, Trust Territory of the Pacific Islands
- Date: November 1, 1952 (74 years ago)
- Test type: Atmospheric
- Yield: 10.4 megatons of TNT

Test chronology

Ivy Mike was the codename given to the first full-yield (Note: The Greenhouse George experimental test in May 1951 was the first device to ignite a thermonuclear secondary.) test of a multi-stage thermonuclear device, also known as the Teller–Ulam design. Ivy Mike was detonated on November 1, 1952, by the United States on the island of Elugelab in Enewetak Atoll, Pacific Proving Grounds, as part of Operation Ivy. Yielding 10.4 megatons of TNT, it dwarfed the previous largest test Greenhouse George (250 kilotons, 1951), and remains the fourth most powerful nuclear test by the US and tenth most powerful overall. The test was a key point in the nuclear arms race between the US and Soviet Union during the Cold War.

US President Harry S. Truman ordered a full-scale hydrogen bomb program in January 1950, five months after the first Soviet nuclear test RDS-1. By March 1951, physicists Edward Teller and Stanisław Ulam produced a report detailing a two-stage design, where the X-rays from a fission bomb are directed toward radiation implosion of a secondary device containing fusion fuel. The experimental Greenhouse George test in May produced fusion with this design; Teller remarked "Eniwetok would not be large enough for the next one".

The device, nicknamed Sausage, was more than 20 ft (6.1 m) tall, and a proof of concept, unsuitable for use as a deliverable weapon. It was designed and constructed at Los Alamos Scientific Laboratory, while design calculations led by John Archibald Wheeler used the UNIVAC I computer. The device consisted of a fission-based Mark 5 nuclear bomb acting as the nuclear primary, which compressed the cylindrical secondary fusion device. This was fuelled by 1,000 liters of cryogenic liquid deuterium in a vacuum flask. A plutonium sparkplug rod in the flask's center aided fusion ignition in the secondary, while the majority of the device yield came from the natural uranium tamper of the secondary, which underwent fast fission by fusion neutrons.

Samples from the explosion led to the discovery of the predicted elements with atomic number 99 and 100, later named einsteinium and fermium. They also contained traces of the isotopes plutonium-246, and plutonium-244. These new nuclei had been produced by the rapid neutron capture process, later formalized in nuclear astrophysics in 1957. The Soviet Union tested a single-stage thermonuclear design, RDS-6s, in August 1953, and a three-megaton two-stage design, RDS-37, in 1955. The United Kingdom (in 1957), China (in 1967), and France (in 1968) later tested multi-megaton thermonuclear devices in the atmosphere.

== Schedule ==
US President Harry S. Truman ordered a full-scale hydrogen bomb program in January 1950, five months after the first Soviet nuclear test RDS-1. Physicists Edward Teller and Stanisław Ulam produced a report detailing the two-stage concept now called the Teller–Ulam design in March 1951, where the X-rays from a fission bomb are directed toward radiation implosion of secondary device containing fusion fuel. There was steady progress made on the issues involved in a thermonuclear explosion and there were additional resources devoted to staging, and political pressure towards seeing, an actual test of a hydrogen bomb. The experimental Greenhouse George test in May produced fusion with this design; Teller remarked "Eniwetok would not be large enough for the next one".

A date within 1952 seemed feasible. In October 1951 physicist Edward Teller pushed for July 1952 as a target date for a first test, but project head Marshall Holloway thought October 1952, a year out, was more realistic given how much engineering and fabrication work the test would take and given the need to avoid the summer monsoon season in the Marshall Islands. On June 30, 1952, United States Atomic Energy Commission chair Gordon Dean showed President Harry S. Truman a model of what the Ivy Mike device would look like; the test was set for November 1, 1952.

One attempt to significantly delay the test, or not hold it at all, was made by the State Department Panel of Consultants on Disarmament, chaired by J. Robert Oppenheimer, who felt that avoiding a test might forestall the development of a catastrophic new weapon and open the way for new arms agreements between the United States and the Soviet Union. The panel lacked political allies in Washington, however, and no test delay was made on this account.

There was a separate desire voiced for a very short delay in the test, for more political reasons: it was scheduled to take place just a few days before the 1952 presidential election. Truman wanted to keep the thermonuclear test away from partisan politics but had no desire to order a postponement of it himself; however he did make it known that he would be fine if it was delayed past the election due to "technical reasons" being found. Atomic Energy Commission member Eugene M. Zuckert was sent to the Enewetak test site to see if such a reason could be found, but weather considerations – on average there were only a handful of days each month that were suitable for the test – indicated it should go ahead as planned, and in the end no schedule delay took place.

== Device design and preparations ==
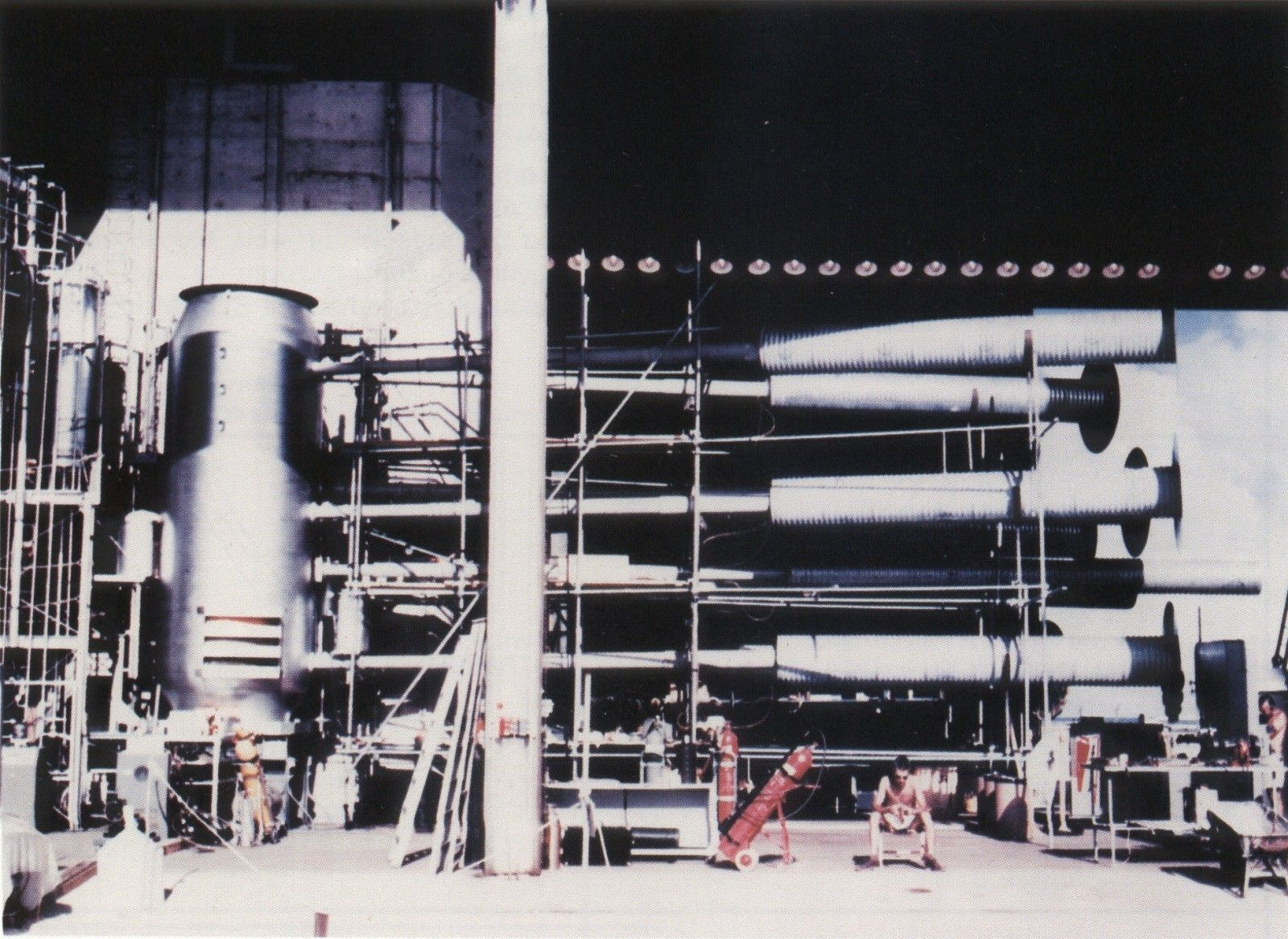
A view of the "Sausage" device casing, with its instrumentation and cryogenic equipment attached. The long pipes were for measurement purposes; their function was to transmit the first radiation from the "primary" and "secondary" stages (known as "Teller light") to instruments just as the device was detonated, before being destroyed in the explosion. The man seated lower right shows scale.

The device, nicknamed Sausage, weighed 82-short-ton (74-metric-ton) and was more than 20 ft (6.1 m) tall. It was a proof of concept, resembling a factory rather than a deliverable weapon. It has been reported that Soviet engineers derisively referred to "Mike" as a "thermonuclear installation". It was designed and constructed at Los Alamos Scientific Laboratory, while design calculations led by John Archibald Wheeler used the UNIVAC I computer.

The device was designed by Richard Garwin, a student of Enrico Fermi, on the suggestion of Edward Teller. It had been decided that nothing other than a full-scale test would validate the idea of the Teller-Ulam design. Garwin was instructed to use very conservative estimates when designing the test, and told that it need not be small and light enough to be deployed by air.

Liquid deuterium was chosen as the fuel for the fusion reaction because its use simplified the experiment from a physicist's point of view, and made the results easier to analyze. From an engineering point of view, its use necessitated the development of previously unknown technologies to handle the difficult material, which had to be stored at extremely low temperatures, near absolute zero. A large cryogenics plant was built to produce liquid hydrogen (used for cooling the device) and deuterium (fuel for the test). A 3000 kW power plant was also constructed for the cryogenics facility.

The device that was developed for testing the Teller-Ulam design became known as a "Sausage" design:

- At its center was a cylindrical insulated steel Dewar (vacuum flask) or cryostat. This tank, almost 7 ft (2.1 m) across and more than 20 ft (6.1 m) high, had walls almost 30 cm (0.98 ft) thick. It weighed approximately 54 short tons (49 metric tons). It was capable of holding 1,000 L (260 U.S. gal) of liquid deuterium, cooled to near-absolute zero. The cryogenic deuterium provided the fuel for the "secondary" (fusion) stage of the explosion.
- At one end of the cylindrical Dewar flask was a TX-5 regular fission bomb (not boosted). The TX-5 bomb was used to create the conditions needed to initiate the fusion reaction. This "primary" fission stage was nested inside the radiation case at the upper section of the device, and was not in physical contact with the "secondary" fusion stage. The TX-5 did not require refrigeration.
- Running down the center of the Dewar flask within the secondary was a cylindrical rod of plutonium within a chamber of tritium gas. This "fission sparkplug" was imploded by x-rays from the primary detonation. That provided a source of outward-moving pressure inside the deuterium and increased conditions for the fusion reaction.
- Surrounding the assembly was a 5-short-ton (4.5-metric-ton) natural uranium "tamper". The exterior of the tamper was lined with sheets of lead and polyethylene, forming a radiation channel to conduct X-rays from the "primary" to the "secondary" stage. As laid out in the Teller-Ulam design, the function of the X-rays was to compress the "secondary" with tamper/pusher ablation, foam plasma pressure and radiation pressure. This process increases the density and temperature of the deuterium to the level needed to sustain a thermonuclear reaction, and compress the "sparkplug" to a supercritical mass – inducing the "sparkplug" to undergo nuclear fission and to thereby start a fusion reaction in the surrounding deuterium fuel.

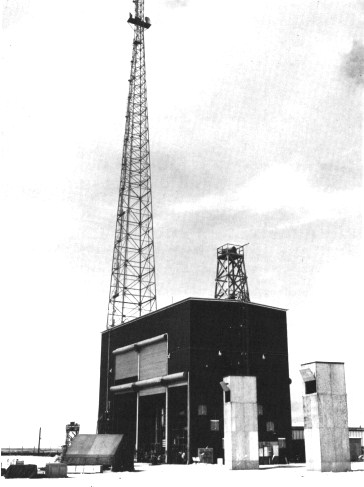
The Ivy Mike shot cab and signal tower.

The entire "Mike" device (including cryogenic equipment) weighed 82 short tons (74 metric tons). It was housed in a large corrugated-aluminum building, called the shot cab, which was 88 ft (27 m) long, 46 ft (14 m) wide, and 61 ft (19 m) high, with a 300 ft (91 m) signal tower. Television and radio signals were used to communicate with a control room on USS Estes where the firing party was located.

It was set up on the Pacific island of Elugelab, part of the Enewetak atoll. Elugelab was connected to the islands of Dridrilbwij (Teiteir), Bokaidrikdrik (Bogairikk), and Boken (Bogon) by a 9,000 ft (2.7 km) artificial causeway. Atop the causeway was an aluminum-sheathed plywood tube filled with helium ballonets, referred to as a Krause-Ogle box. This allowed gamma and neutron radiation to pass uninhibited to instruments in an unmanned detection station, Station 202, on Boken Island. From there signals were sent to recording equipment at Station 200, also housed in a bunker on Boken Island. Personnel returned to Boken Island after the test to recover the recording equipment.

In total, 9,350 military and 2,300 civilian personnel were involved in the "Mike" shot. The operation involved the cooperation of the United States Army, Navy, Air Force and intelligence services. The USS Curtiss brought components from the United States to Elugelab for assembly. Work was completed on October 31, at 5.00 p.m. Within an hour, personnel were evacuated in preparation for the blast.

== Detonation ==
Ivy-Mike fireball

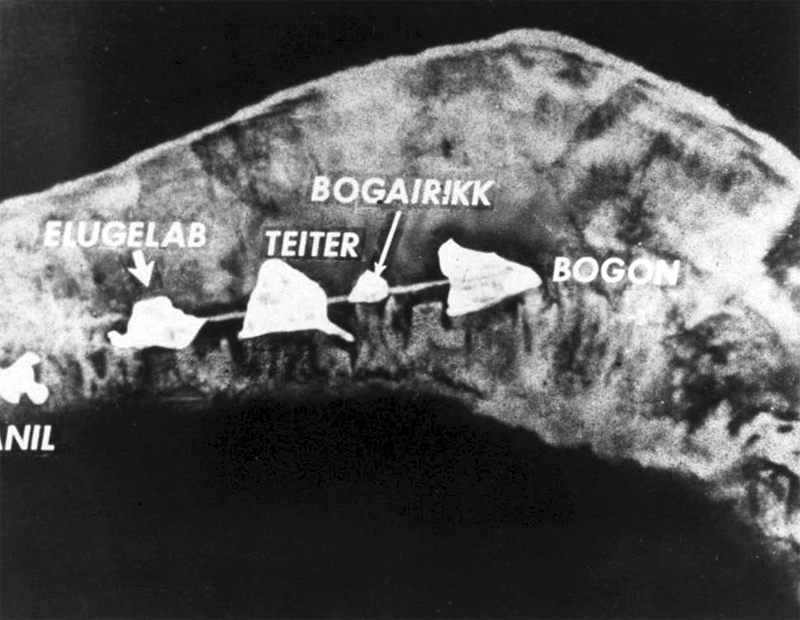
Enewetak Atoll, before "Mike" shot. Note island of Elugelab on left.

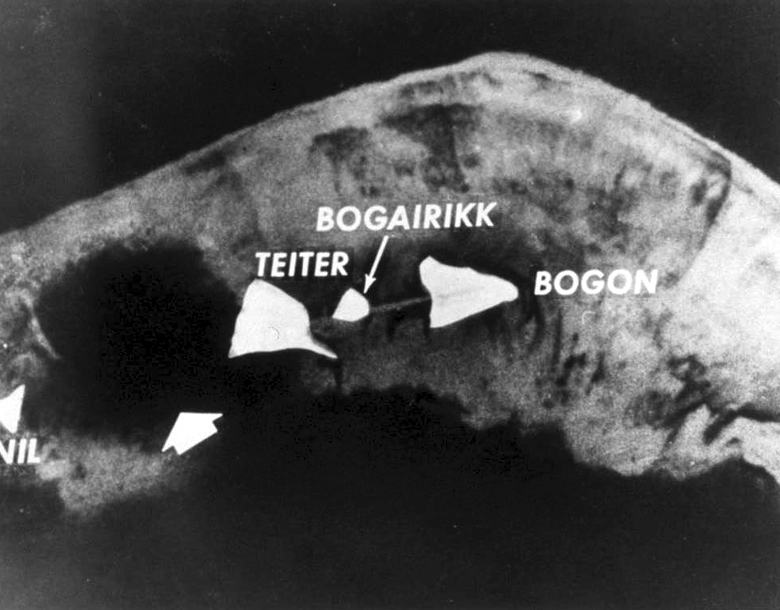
Enewetak Atoll, after "Mike" shot. The crater is on the left.

The test was carried out on 1 November 1952 at 07:15 local time (19:15 on 31 October, Greenwich Mean Time). It produced a yield of 10.4 megatons of TNT (44 PJ). 77% of the final yield came from fast fission of the uranium tamper, which produced large amounts of radioactive fallout.

The fireball created by the explosion had a maximum radius of 2.9 to 3.3 km (1.8 to 2.1 mi). The maximum radius was reached several seconds after the detonation, during which the hot fireball lifted up due to buoyancy. While still relatively close to the ground, the fireball had yet to reach its maximum dimensions and was thus approximately 5.2 km (3.2 mi) wide. The mushroom cloud rose to an altitude of 17 km (56,000 ft) in less than 90 seconds. One minute later it had reached 33 km (108,000 ft), before stabilizing at 41 km (135,000 ft) with the top eventually spreading out to a diameter of 161 km (100 mi) with a stem 32 km (20 mi) wide.

The blast created a crater 1.9 km (6,230 ft) in diameter and 50 m (164 ft) deep where Elugelab had once been; the blast and water waves from the explosion (some waves up to 6 m (20 ft) high) stripped the test islands clean of vegetation, as observed by a helicopter survey within 60 minutes after the test, by which time the mushroom cloud and steam were blown away. Radioactive coral debris fell upon ships positioned 56 km (35 mi) away, and the immediate area around the atoll was heavily contaminated.

Close to the fireball, lightning discharges were rapidly triggered. The entire shot was documented by the filmmakers of Lookout Mountain studios. A post-production explosion sound was overdubbed over what was a completely silent detonation from the vantage point of the camera, with the blast wave sound only arriving later, as akin to thunder, with the exact time depending on its distance. The film was also accompanied by powerful, Wagner-esque music featured on many test films of that period and was hosted by actor Reed Hadley. A private screening was given to President Dwight D. Eisenhower who had succeeded President Harry S. Truman in January 1953. In 1954, the film was released to the public after censoring, and was shown on commercial television channels.

Edward Teller, perhaps the most ardent supporter of the development of the hydrogen bomb, was in Berkeley, California, at the time of the shot. He was able to receive first notice that the test was successful by observing a seismometer, which picked up the shock wave that traveled through the earth from the Pacific Proving Grounds. In his memoirs, Teller wrote that he immediately sent an unclassified telegram to Dr. Elizabeth "Diz" Graves, the head of the rump project remaining at Los Alamos during the shot. The telegram contained only the words "It's a boy," which came hours earlier than any other word from Enewetak.

== Scientific discoveries ==
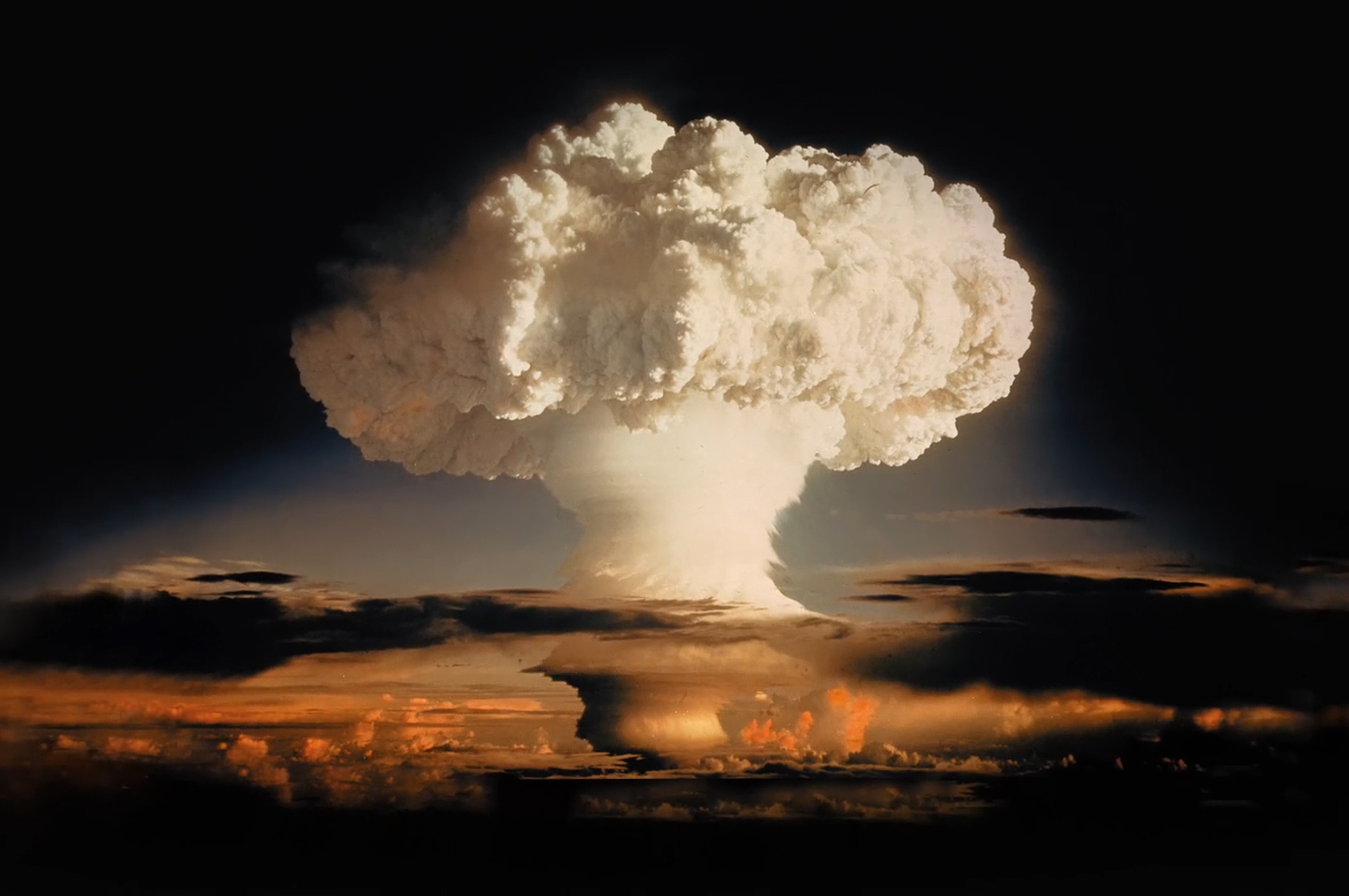
Mike mushroom cloud.

An hour after the bomb was detonated, U.S. Air Force pilots took off from Enewetak Island to fly into the atomic cloud and take samples. Pilots had to monitor extra readouts and displays while "piloting under unusual, dangerous, and difficult conditions” including heat, radiation, unpredictable winds and flying debris. "Red Flight" Leader Virgil K. Meroney flew into the stem of the explosion first. In five minutes, he had gathered all the samples he could, and exited. Next Bob Hagan and Jimmy Robinson entered the cloud. Robinson hit an area of severe turbulence, entering a spin and barely retaining consciousness. He regained control of his plane at 20,000 feet, but the electromagnetic storm had disrupted his instruments. In rain and poor visibility, without working instruments, Hagan and Robinson were unable to find the KB-29 tanker aircraft to refuel. They attempted to return to the field at Enewetak. Hagan, out of fuel, made a successful dead-stick landing on the runway. Robinson's F-84 Thunderjet crashed and sank 3.5 miles short of the island. Robinson's body was never recovered.

Fuel tanks on the airplane's wings had been modified to scoop up and filter passing debris. The filters from the surviving planes were sealed in lead and sent to Los Alamos, New Mexico for analysis. Radioactive and contaminated with calcium carbonate, the "Mike" samples were extremely difficult to handle. Scientists at Los Alamos found traces in them of isotopes plutonium-246 and plutonium-244.

Al Ghiorso at the University of California, Berkeley speculated that the filters might also contain atoms that had transformed, through radioactive decay, into the predicted but undiscovered elements 99 and 100. Ghiorso, Stanley Gerald Thompson and Glenn Seaborg obtained half a filter paper from the Ivy Mike test. They were able to detect the existence of the elements einsteinium and fermium, which had been produced by intensely concentrated neutron flux about the detonation site. The discovery was kept secret for several years, but the team was eventually given credit. In 1955 the two new elements were named in honor of Albert Einstein and Enrico Fermi.

== Related tests ==
A simplified and lightened bomb version (the EC-16) was prepared and scheduled to be tested in operation Castle Yankee, as a backup in case the non-cryogenic "Shrimp" fusion device (tested in Castle Bravo) failed to work; that test was canceled when the Bravo device was tested successfully, making the cryogenic designs obsolete.

== Gallery ==
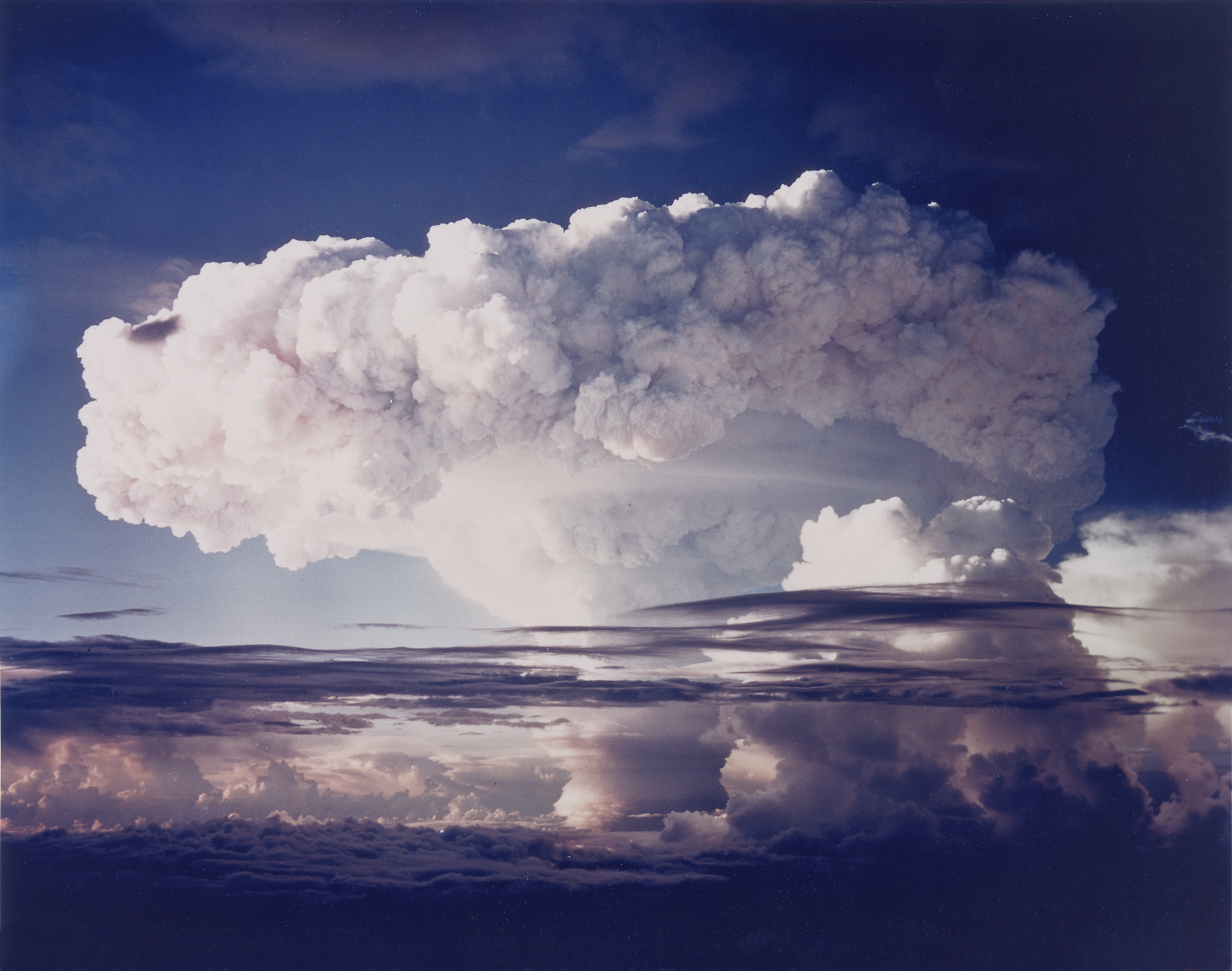

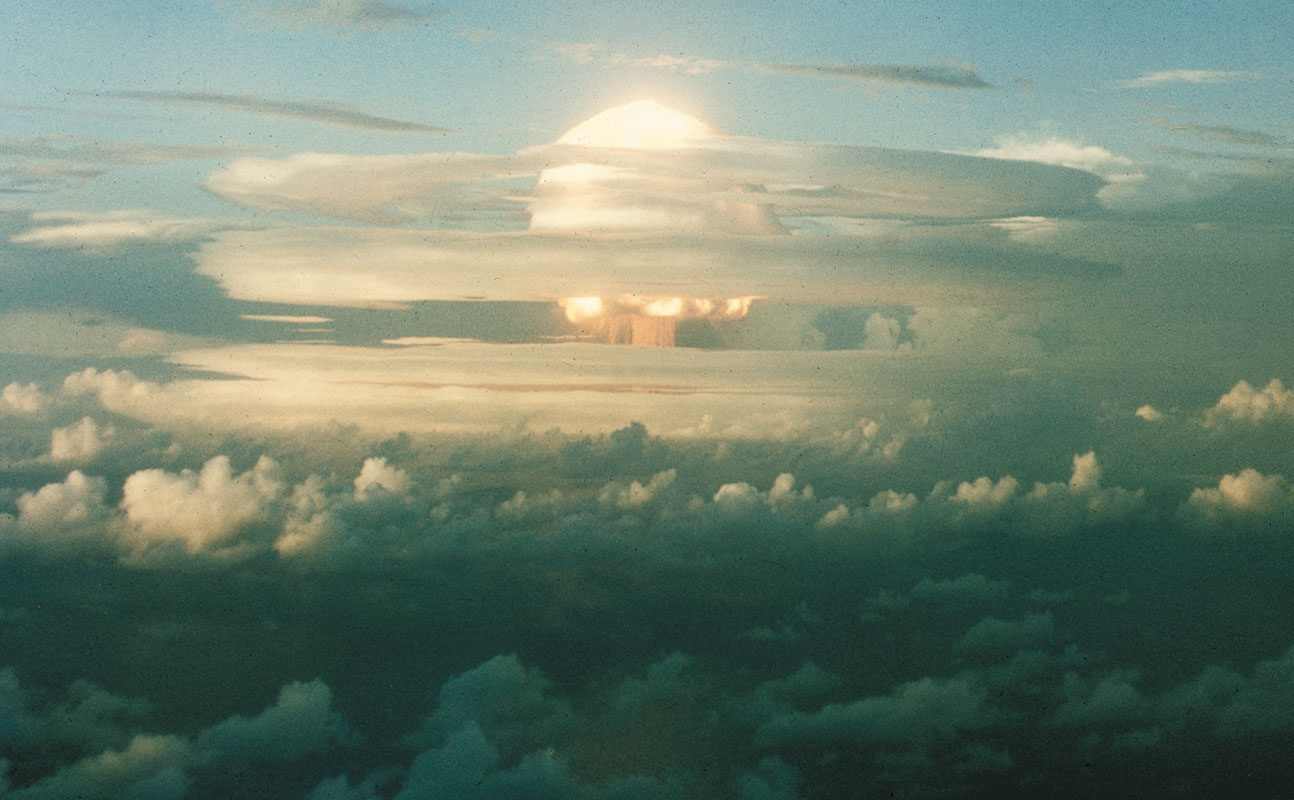

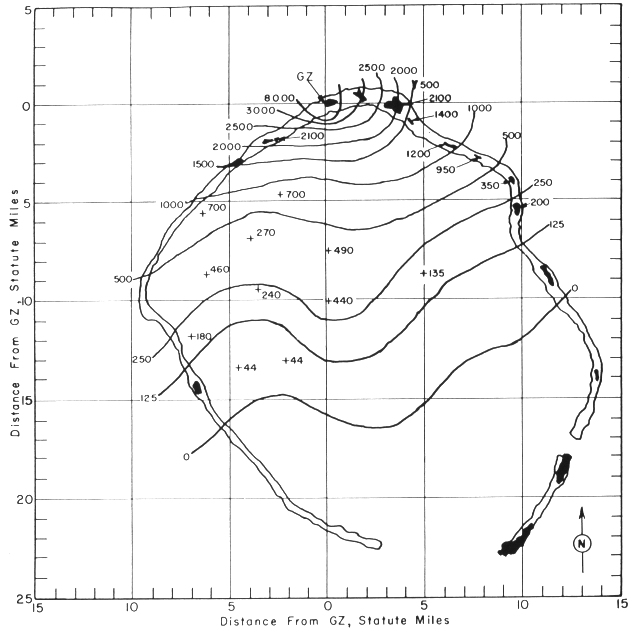
Nuclear fallout map of Mike test.

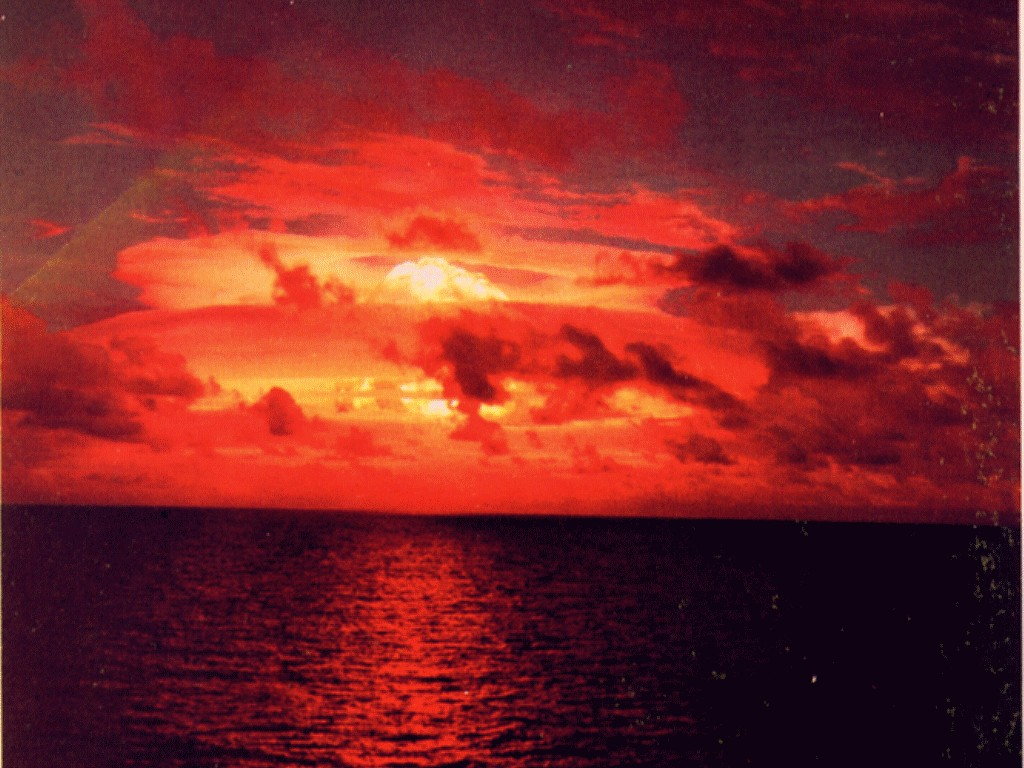
Mike fireball.

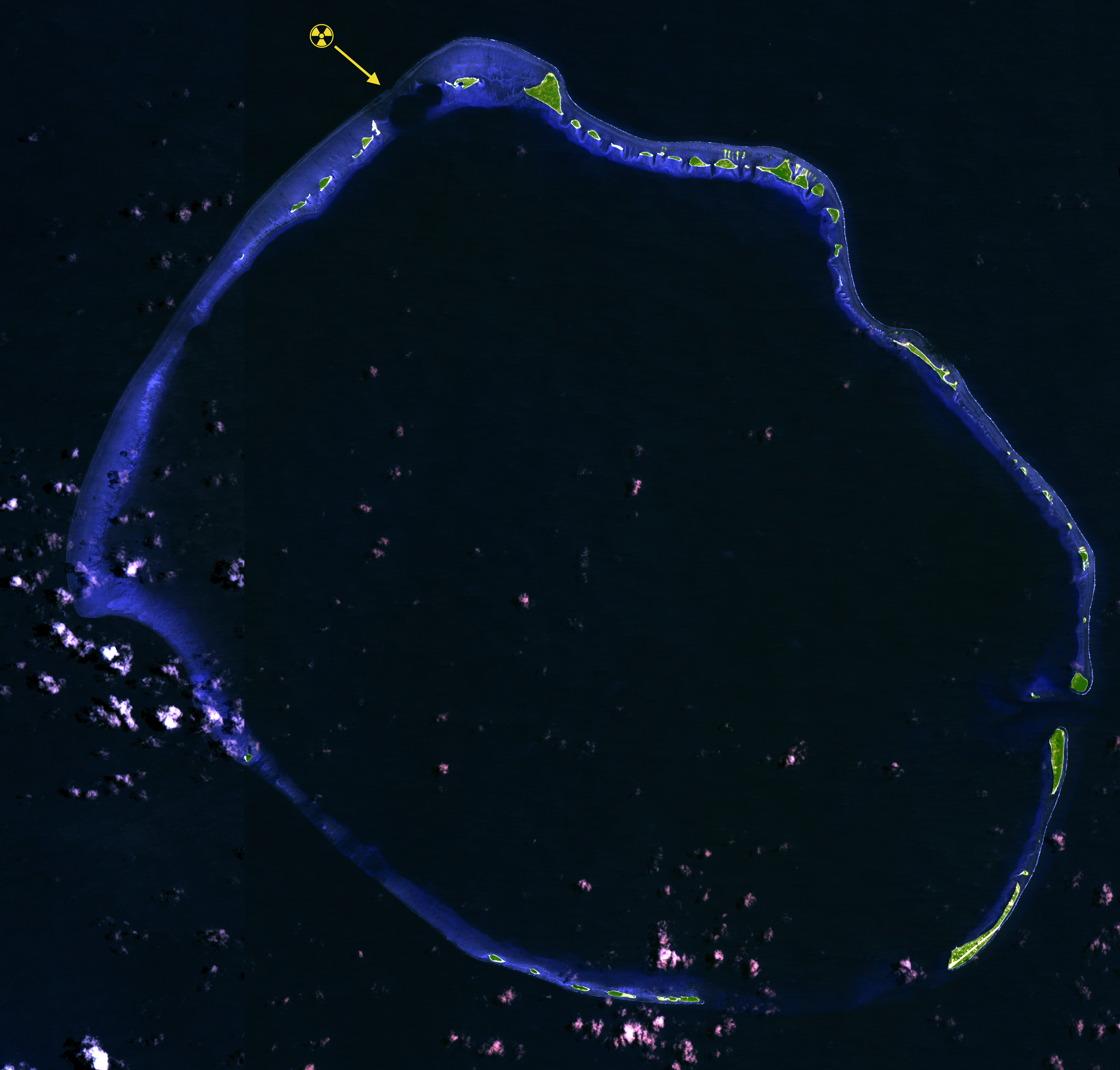
Mike test crater, relative to Enewetak Atoll.

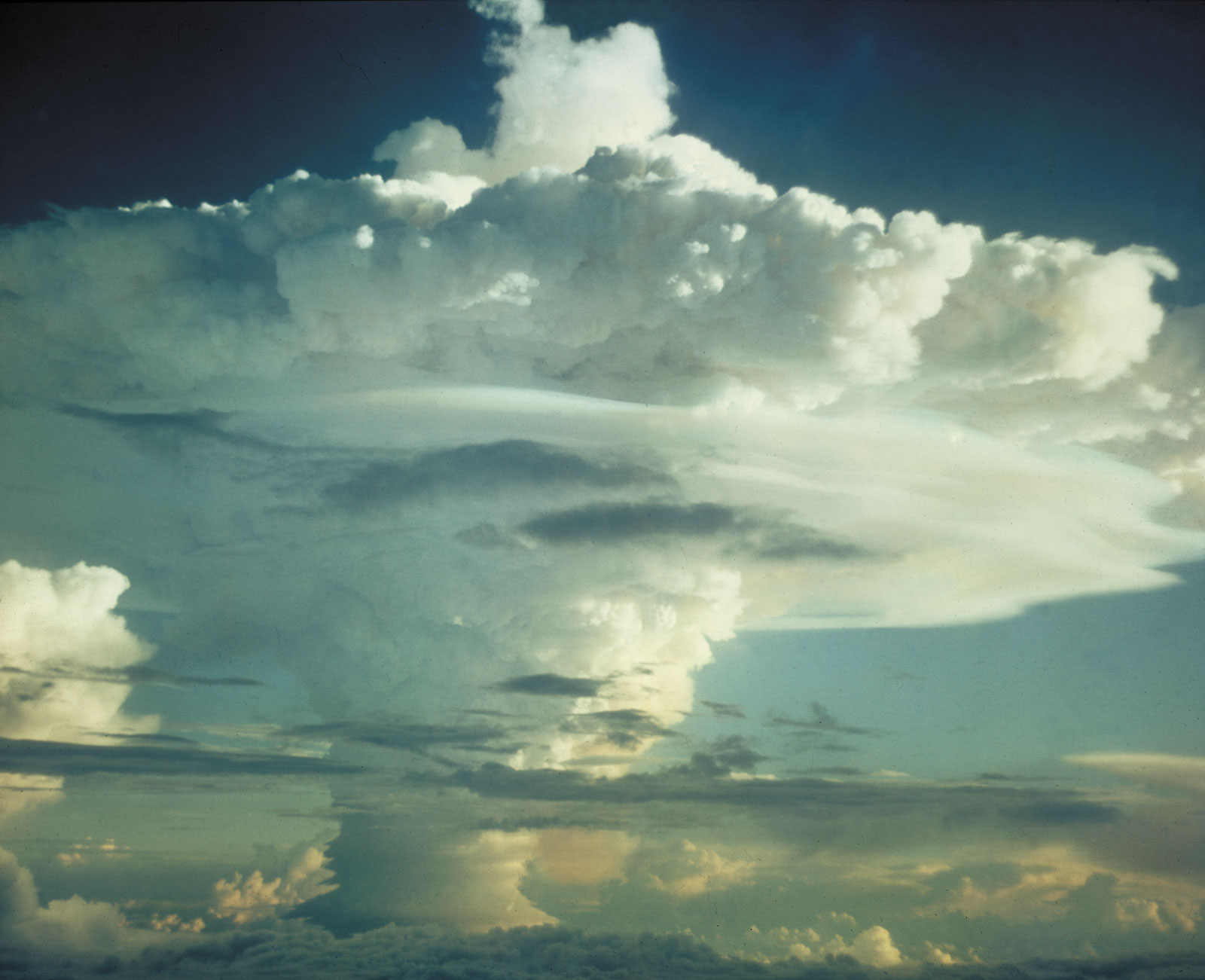
Mike mushroom cloud central stem's updraft tropopause overshoots.

== See also ==
- History of nuclear weapons
- Operation Castle
- RDS-6s – first Soviet thermonuclear test, coming less than a year later
