= Elugelab =

Former island in the Pacific Ocean

Coordinates: 11°40′0″N 162°11′13″E

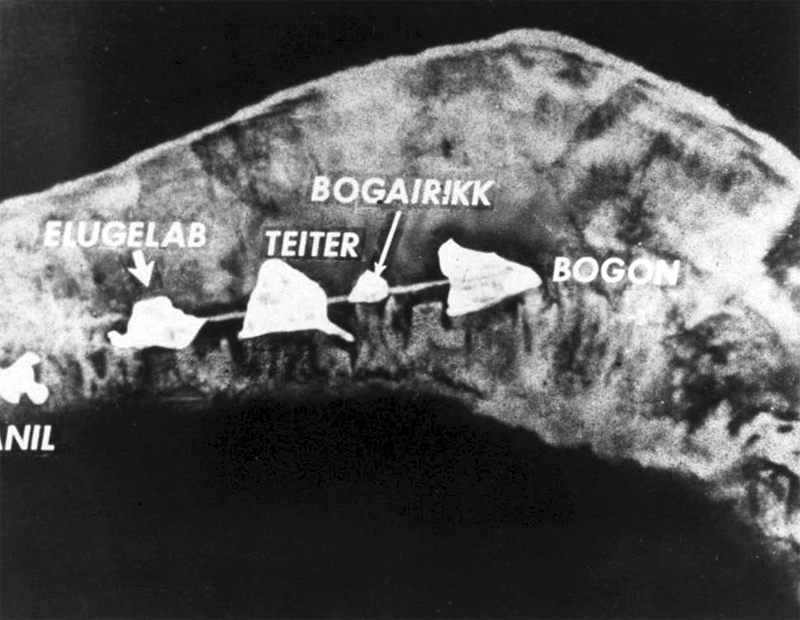
Enewetak Atoll, before Mike shot. Note island of Elugelab on left.

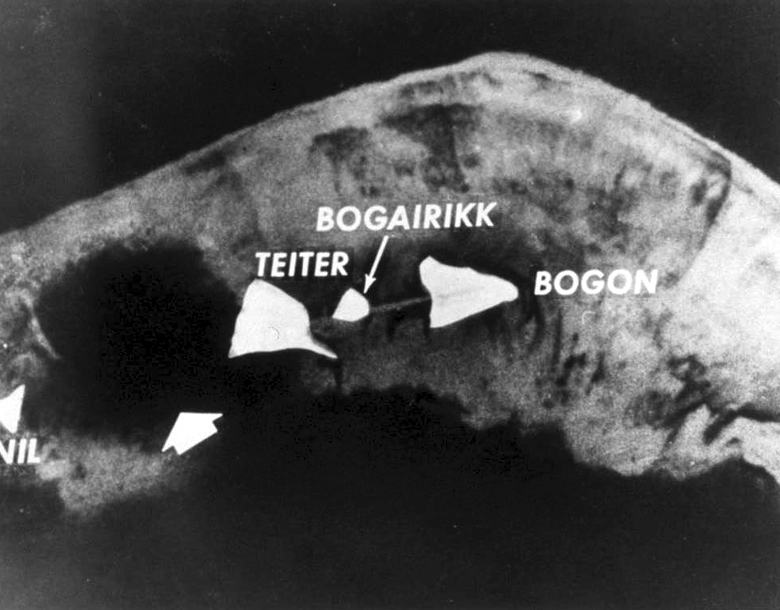
Enewetak Atoll, after Mike shot. Note crater on left.

Elugelab, or Elugelap (Marshallese: Āllokļap, [ællʲoɡʷ(o)lˠɑpʲ]), was an island, part of the Enewetak Atoll in the Marshall Islands. It was destroyed in the world's first full-scale thermonuclear explosion, the Mike shot of Operation Ivy, on November 1, 1952. (Note: Some sources date the event as October 31, based on their time zone. Locally, it was November 1 (GMT+12).) Prior to being destroyed, the island was described as "just another small naked island of the atoll".

== Environment ==
The land had palm trees and the surrounding marine had Heliopora coral growth which was home to Eurythoe complanata and Haplosyllis spongicola, most of which by 1954 were dead or dying.

== Explosion ==
The fireball created by Ivy Mike had a maximum diameter of 5.8 to 6.56 km (3 5/8 to 4 1/8 mi). This maximum is reached a number of seconds after the detonation and during this time the hot fireball invariably rises due to buoyancy. While still relatively close to the ground, the fireball had yet to reach its maximum dimensions and was thus approximately 5.2 km (3 1/4 mi) wide.

The detonation produced a crater 1.9 km (6,200 ft) in diameter and 50 m (160 ft) deep where Elugelab had once been; the blast and water waves from the explosion (some waves up to 6.1 m or 20 ft high) stripped the test islands clean of vegetation, as observed by a helicopter survey within 60 minutes after the test, by which time the mushroom cloud had blown away. The island "became dust and ash, pulled upward to form a mushroom cloud that rose about twenty-seven miles [43 km] into the sky." The outcome of the test was reported to incoming president Dwight D. Eisenhower by Atomic Energy Commission Chairman, Gordon Dean, as follows: “The island of Elugelab is missing!”.

According to Eric Schlosser, all that remained of Elugelab was a circular crater filled with seawater, more than 1 mile (1,600 metres) in diameter and "fifteen stories deep". The blast yielded 10.4 megatons of explosive energy, 700 times the energy that leveled central Hiroshima. Aerial footage of Elugelab and adjacent islands well before Mike shot at a time prior to the connecting causeway being created is available, as is footage after the causeway was finished that supported the diagnostic Krause-Ogle box light pipe system, with numerous trees removed in preparation of the shot also plainly evident, along with footage of the aforementioned helicopter survey of the Mike crater soon after the detonation, and finally, high-altitude footage of the crater accompanied with details of its depth – "175 feet [53 m] deep" – equivalent to the height of a "17-story building" and with an area large enough to accommodate about "14 Pentagon buildings".

The detonation also collapsed some natural crevices in the reef, some distance away from the rim of the crater. Full radioecology recovery surveys were documented before and after each test series.

=== Impact on the nuclear arms race ===
This test marked a pivotal moment in escalating the nuclear weapons development arms race. The Soviet Union conducted its own thermonuclear test three years later. It was believed that Soviet scientists were able to sustain the development of the hydrogen bomb partly because they received U.S. research details from atomic spy Klaus Fuchs. However, the Bulletin of the Atomic Scientists indicated in the 1990s that most of the information Fuchs provided may have been useless.

== Gallery ==
Ivy Mike test of 1952, this video contains a misleading post-production explosion sound overdubbed on what was a completely silent detonation from the vantage point of the camera, with the sound of the blast wave only arriving a number of seconds later, akin to thunder, with the exact time depending on its distance.

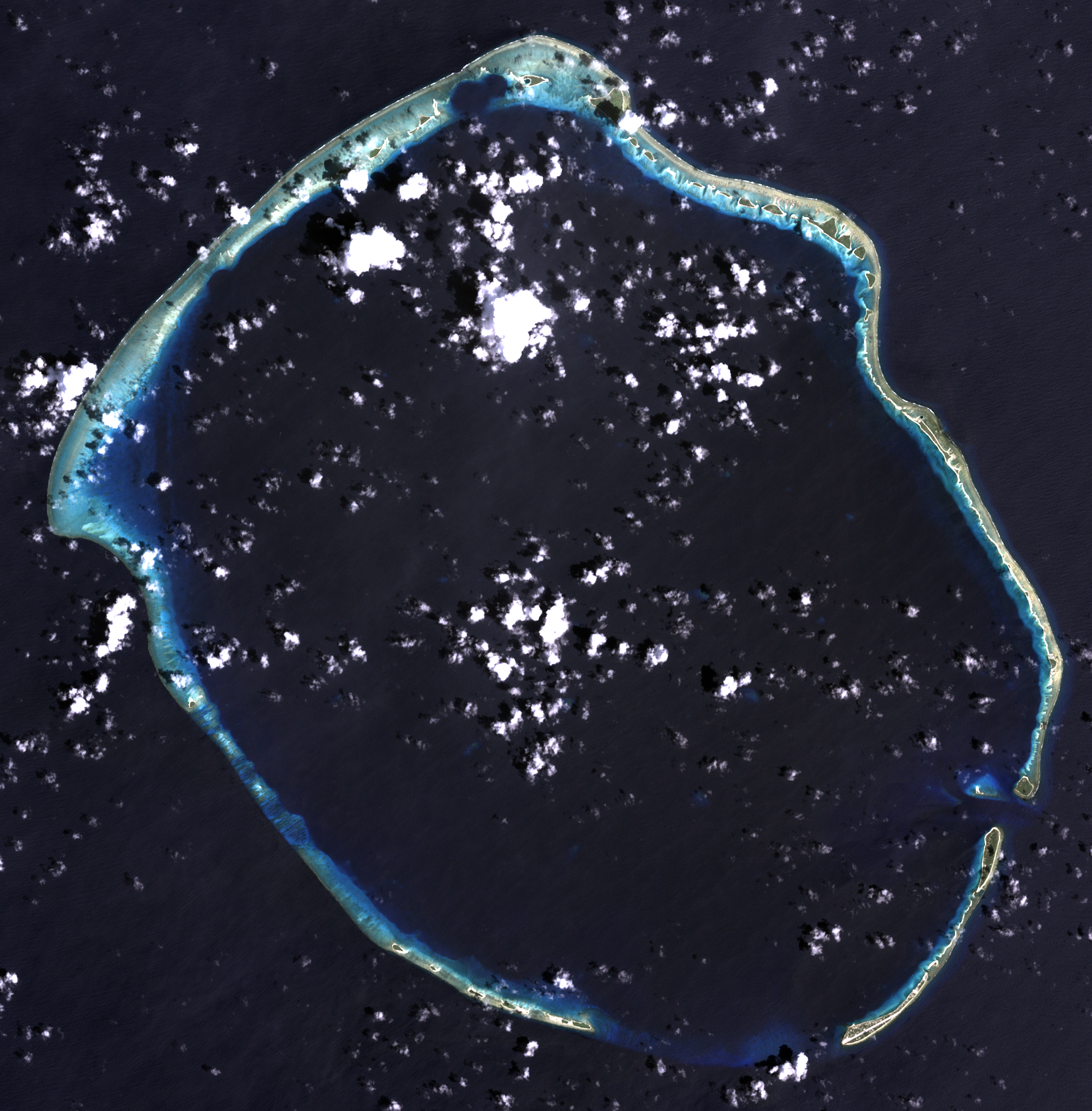
A 2002 true-color photograph of Enewetak Atoll. The relatively large Ivy Mike crater can be seen at the top of the atoll in this image with the smaller, adjoining Castle Nectar crater, in close proximity. The much smaller Redwing Seminole crater can faintly be seen on Bogon Island.

== See also ==
- Nuclear fusion
- Ivy Mike
- Operation Ivy
- Operation Castle
- Operation Redwing
- Nuclear fission
- Meteor Crater, or Barringer crater – a deeper crater that formed in a natural impact event with the release of about the same amount of energy: 10 megatons.
- Krakatoa – a larger island that was destroyed by a much more powerful natural volcanic explosion.
- Explosion crater
