= List of non-fiction books about nuclear issues =

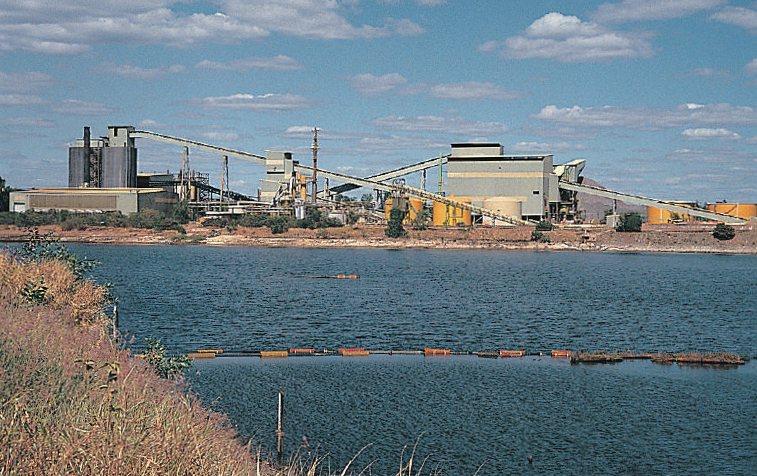
Ranger Uranium Mine complex in Australia

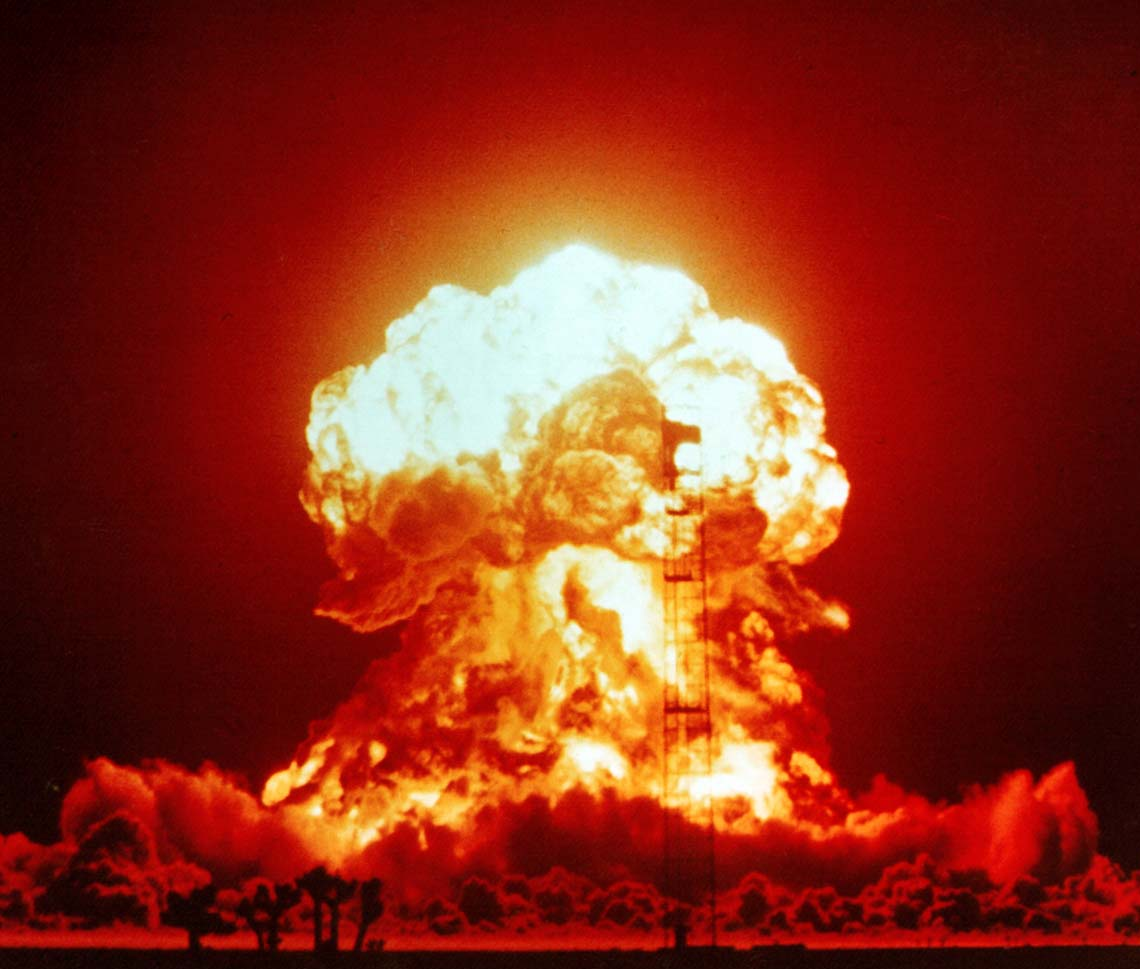
The expanding fireball from the "Badger" United States nuclear test

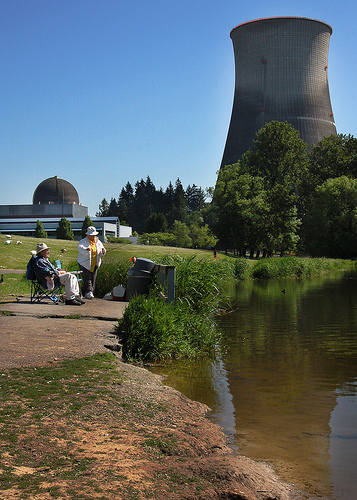
The decommissioned Trojan Nuclear Power Plant

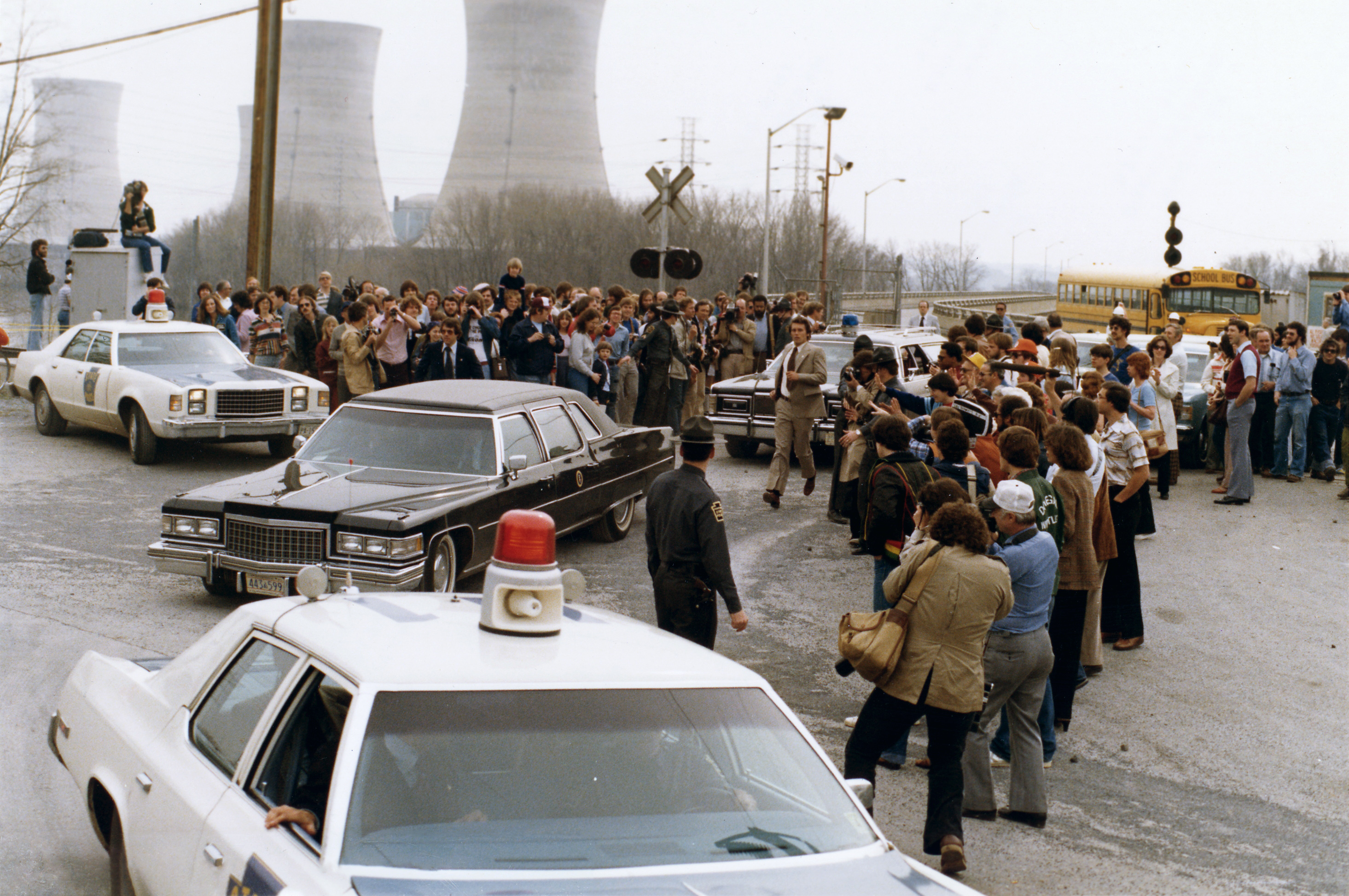
President Jimmy Carter in Pennsylvania following the Three Mile Island accident in 1979

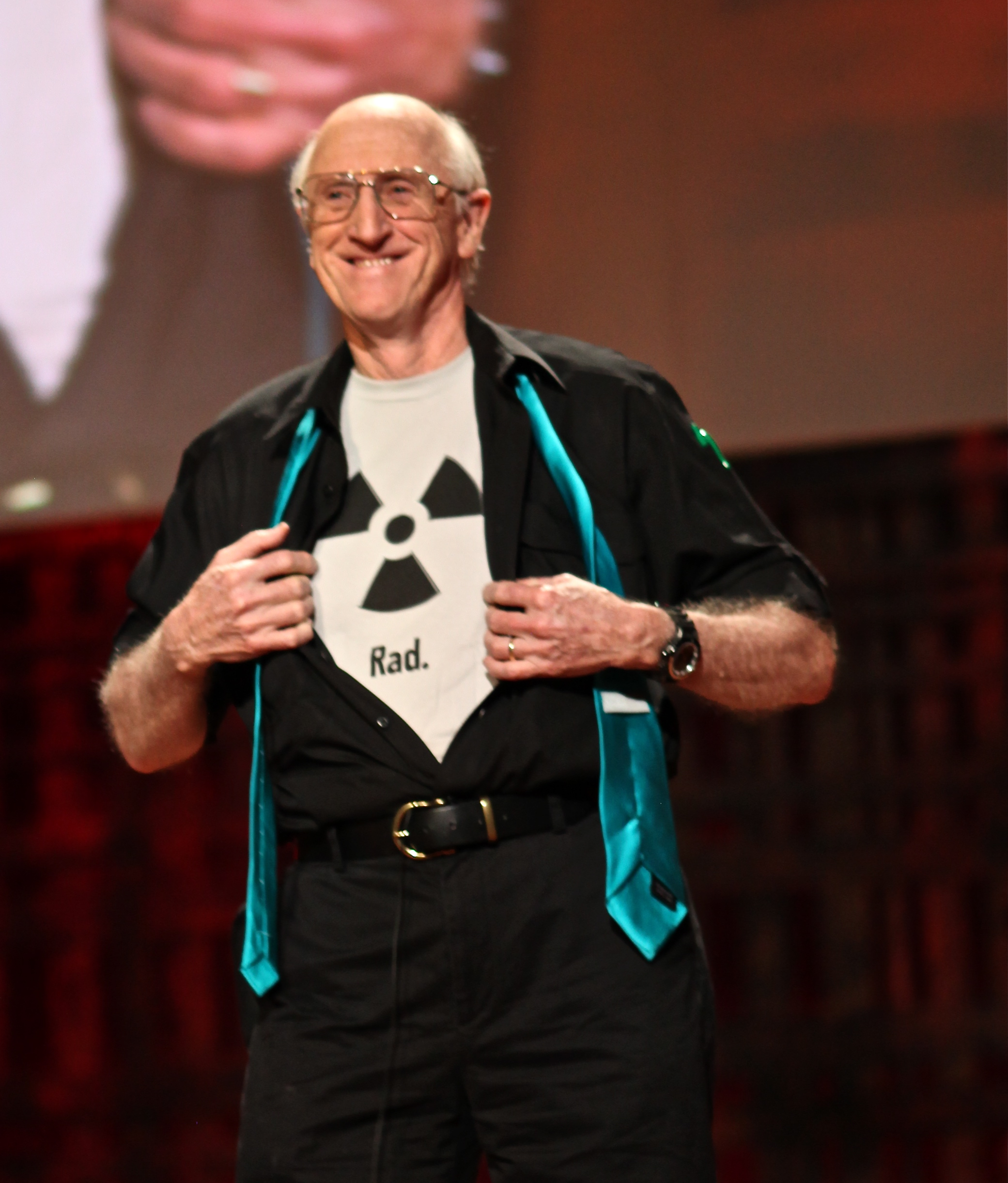
Stewart Brand at a 2010 debate, "Does the world need nuclear energy?"

This is a list of non-fiction books about nuclear issues, including uranium mining, nuclear weapons, and nuclear power.

== List of books ==
Year	Book
1945	Smyth Report
1946	Hiroshima
1947	Explaining the Atom
1949	The Bells of Nagasaki
1950	Survival Under Atomic Attack
1957	Our Friend the Atom
1958	Brighter than a Thousand Suns: A Personal History of the Atomic Scientists
1960	On Thermonuclear War
1960	The Strategy of Conflict
1961	Fallout Protection
1961	The Day of the Bomb
1971	Essence of Decision: Explaining the Cuban Missile Crisis
1974	Biswasghatak
1975	Non-Nuclear Futures: The Case for an Ethical Energy Strategy
1975	We Almost Lost Detroit
1976	The Nuclear Power Controversy
1976	Nuclear Power and the Environment
1979	Nuclear War Survival Skills
1980	Life After Doomsday
1980	Protect and Survive
1980	The People of Three Mile Island
1981	The Atom Besieged: Extraparliamentary Dissent in France and Germany
1982	Brittle Power: Energy Strategy for National Security
1982	Killing Our Own: The Disaster of America’s Experience with Atomic Radiation
1982	Nukespeak: Nuclear Language, Visions and Mindset
1982	The Cult of the Atom: The Secret Papers of the Atomic Energy Commission
1982	The Fate of the Earth
1982	The Hundredth Monkey
1982	Three Mile Island: Thirty Minutes to Meltdown
1984	Normal Accidents: Living with High-Risk Technologies
1984	The Cold and the Dark: The World after Nuclear War
1984	The Fourth Protocol
1988	U.S. Nuclear Weapons: The Secret History
1988	The Making of the Atomic Bomb
1991	The International Politics of Nuclear Waste
1991	The Samson Option: Israel's Nuclear Arsenal and American Foreign Policy
1991	The Truth About Chernobyl
1992	Los Alamos Primer
1994	When Technology Fails
1996	Nuclear Rites
1997	Licensed to Kill? The Nuclear Regulatory Commission and the Shoreham Power Plant
1997	Nuclear Politics in America
1998	Critical Masses: Opposition to Nuclear Power in California, 1958–1978
1998	Nuclear Weapons: The Road to Zero
1998	The Gift of Time: The Case for Abolishing Nuclear Weapons Now
1999	The Angry Genie: One Man's Walk Through the Nuclear Age
1999	Making a Real Killing: Rocky Flats and the Nuclear West
1999	The Plutonium Files: America's Secret Medical Experiments in the Cold War
2001	Megawatts and Megatons
2001	The Algebra of Infinite Justice
2001	The Unfinished Twentieth Century
2004	Fallout: An American Nuclear Tragedy
2004	Nuclear Terrorism: The Ultimate Preventable Catastrophe
2004	The Four Faces of Nuclear Terrorism
2005	American Prometheus: The Triumph and Tragedy of J. Robert Oppenheimer
2005	Voices from Chernobyl: The Oral History of a Nuclear Disaster
2006	Britain, Australia and the Bomb
2006	Chernobyl. Vengeance of peaceful atom.
2006	Conservation Fallout: Nuclear Protest at Diablo Canyon
2006	Nuclear Power is Not the Answer
2006	The Navajo People and Uranium Mining
2006	The Psychology of Nuclear Proliferation
2006	TORCH report
2007	Carbon-Free and Nuclear-Free
2007	Canada’s Deadly Secret: Saskatchewan Uranium and the Global Nuclear System
2007	The Lean Guide to Nuclear Energy: A Life-Cycle in Trouble
2007	Power to Save the World: The Truth About Nuclear Energy
2007	Maralinga: Australia’s Nuclear Waste Cover-up
2007	Nuclear Nebraska: The Remarkable Story of the Little County That Couldn’t Be Bought
2007	Nuclear or Not? Does Nuclear Power Have a Place in a Sustainable Energy Future?
2007	On Nuclear Terrorism
2007	Reaction Time: Climate Change and the Nuclear Option
2007	The Seventh Decade: The New Shape of Nuclear Danger
2008	Nuclear Implosions: The Rise and Fall of the Washington Public Power Supply System
2009	Uranium Wars: The Scientific Rivalry that Created the Nuclear Age
2009	Chernobyl: Consequences of the Catastrophe for People and the Environment
2009	In Mortal Hands: A Cautionary History of the Nuclear Age
2009	Joseph Rotblat: A Man of Conscience in the Nuclear Age
2009	Confronting the Bomb: A Short History of the World Nuclear Disarmament Movement
2009	My Australian Story: Atomic Testing
2010	Atomic Obsession: Nuclear Alarmism From Hiroshima to Al-Qaeda
2010	The Last Train From Hiroshima
2011	Contesting the Future of Nuclear Power
2011	What Will Work: Fighting Climate Change with Renewable Energy, Not Nuclear Power
2012	Full Body Burden: Growing Up in the Nuclear Shadow of Rocky Flats
2012	The Doomsday Machine: The High Price of Nuclear Energy, The World's Most Dangerous Fuel
2012	Trinity: A Graphic History of the First Atomic Bomb
2013	Command and Control (book)
2013	Fukushima: Japan's Tsunami and the Inside Story of the Nuclear Meltdowns
2013	Plutopia
2013	World Nuclear Industry Status Report
2014	Manufactured Crisis: The Untold Story of the Iran Nuclear Scare
2017	The Doomsday Machine: Confessions of a Nuclear War Planner
2019	Nuclear War in the UK
2022	Nuclear Nuevo México

== Fiction ==
- Red Jihad (2012)

== See also ==
- Bulletin of the Atomic Scientists
- List of books about energy issues
- List of books about renewable energy
- List of nuclear holocaust fiction
- List of films about nuclear issues
- List of songs about nuclear war
- List of crimes involving radioactive substances
- List of environmental books
- Nuclear weapons in popular culture
- Rise and Kill First
