= Graham Allison =

American political scientist

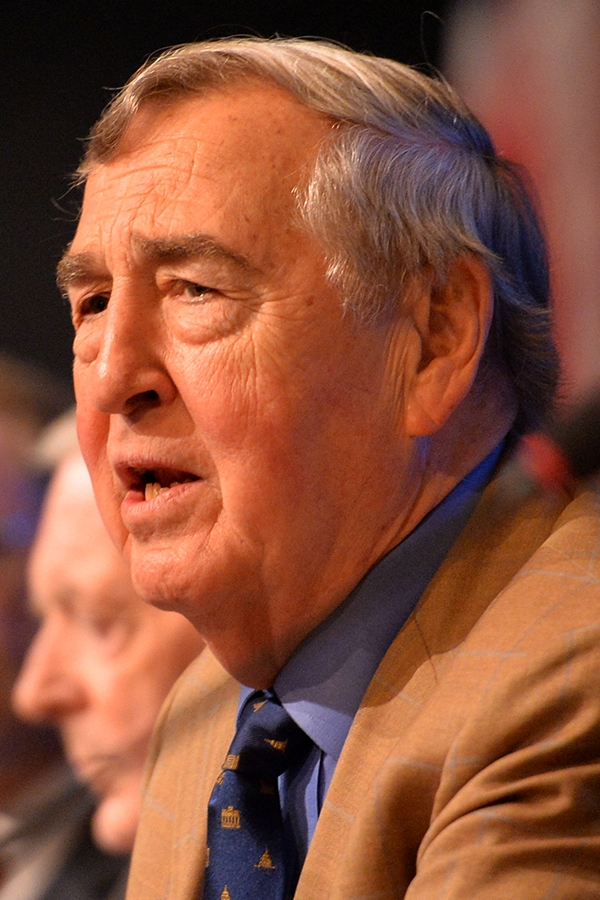
- Allison in 2017

Director of the Belfer Center for Science and International Affairs
- In office June 1, 1995 – July 1, 2017
- Succeeded by: Ash Carter

Assistant Secretary of Defense for Policy and Plans
- In office August 6, 1993 – March 15, 1994
- President: Bill Clinton

Dean of the John F. Kennedy School of Government
- In office June 1, 1977 – May 30, 1989
- Preceded by: Don K. Price
- Succeeded by: Robert D. Putnam

Personal details
- Born: Graham Tillett Allison Jr. March 23, 1940 (age 86) Charlotte, North Carolina, U.S.
- Education: Harvard University (BA, PhD); Hertford College, Oxford (BA, MA)

Graham Tillett Allison Jr. (born March 23, 1940) is an American political scientist and the Douglas Dillon Professor of Government at the John F. Kennedy School of Government at Harvard University.

He is known for his contributions in the late 1960s and early 1970s to the bureaucratic analysis of decision making, especially during times of crisis. His book Remaking Foreign Policy: The Organizational Connection, co-written with Peter L. Szanton, was published in 1976 and influenced the foreign policy of the Carter administration.

Since the 1970s, Allison has also been a leading analyst of U.S. national security and defense policy, with a special interest in nuclear weapons and terrorism.

== Early life and education ==
Allison is from Charlotte, North Carolina, and graduated from Myers Park High School in 1958. He attended Davidson College for two years, then transferred to Harvard University from which he graduated in 1962 with a B.A. degree. Allison then completed B.A. and M.A. in philosophy, politics and economics at Oxford University as a Marshall Scholar in 1964 and returned to Harvard to earn a Ph.D. in political science in 1968, where Henry Kissinger was one of his professors.

== Career ==
Allison has spent his entire academic career at Harvard, as an assistant professor (1968), associate professor (1970), then full professor (1972) in the department of government on the strength of his book Essence of Decision: Explaining the Cuban Missile Crisis (1971), in which he developed two new theoretical paradigms – an organizational process model and a bureaucratic politics model – to compete with the then-prevalent approach of understanding foreign policy decision-making using a rational actor model. Essence of Decision revolutionized the study of decision-making in political science and beyond.

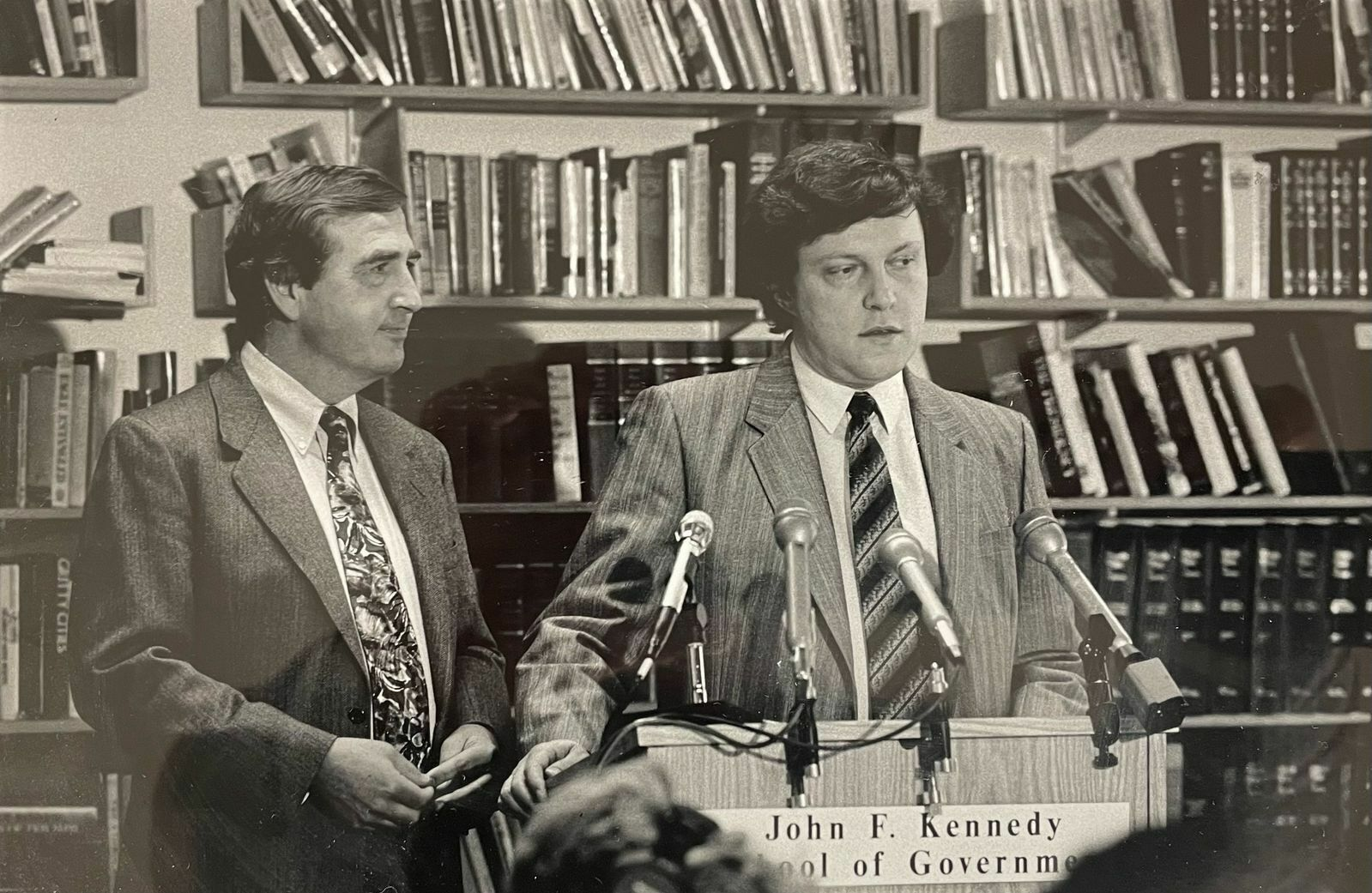
Graham Allison and Russian economist Grigory Yavlinsky in May 1991

From 1977 to 1989, Allison was dean of the Harvard Kennedy School at Harvard University. Over the course of his tenure as dean, Harvard Kennedy School increased in size by 400% and its endowment by 700%.

He was associated with the Assistant Secretary of Defense for Policy and Plans from 1993 to 1994, where he coordinated strategy and policy towards the states of the former Soviet Union. President Bill Clinton awarded Allison the Department of Defense Medal for Distinguished Public Service, for "reshaping relations with Russia, Ukraine, Belarus, and Kazakhstan to reduce the former Soviet nuclear arsenal".

Allison directed the Belfer Center for Science and International Affairs from 1995 until 2017, when he was succeeded by former U.S. Secretary of Defense Ash Carter.

In a 2012 Financial Times article titled "Thucydides’s trap has been sprung in the Pacific", Allison coined the term the Thucydides Trap to argue for the possibility of a war between the United States and China. Allison later defined as the Trap as a historical pattern where "when one great power threatens to displace another, war is almost always the result," and in 2017 expanded his argument about a future conflict into a full-length book, Destined for War. The theory is based on the History of the Peloponnesian War, in which Thucydides wrote, "What made war inevitable was the growth of Athenian power and the fear which this caused in Sparta." Allison asserts that circumstances at the start of World War I (involving British fears about Germany), the War of the Spanish Succession, and the Thirty Years' War (involving French insecurity about the Habsburg empires of Spain and Austria) exhibit the trap. The term appeared in a paid opinion advertisement in The New York Times on April 6, 2017, on the occasion of U.S. President Donald Trump's meeting with Chinese leader Xi Jinping, which stated, "Both major players in the region share a moral obligation to steer away from Thucydides's Trap." Both Allison's conception of the Thucydides Trap and its applicability to U.S.-Chinese relations have encountered heavy scholarly criticism. In March 2019, the Journal of Chinese Political Science dedicated a special issue to the topic, suggesting power transition narratives do appear to matter with regard to domestic perception.

Allison remains Douglas Dillon Professor of Government at Harvard.

Allison has also been a fellow of the Center for Advanced Studies (1973–74); member of the visiting committee on foreign policy studies at the Brookings Institution (1972–77); and a member of the Trilateral Commission (1974–84 and 2018). He was among those mentioned to succeed David Rockefeller as President of the Council on Foreign Relations. In 1979 Allison received an honorary doctorate from the Faculty of Social Sciences at Uppsala University, Sweden.

In 2009 he was awarded the NAS Award for Behavior Research Relevant to the Prevention of Nuclear War from the National Academy of Sciences.

Allison has also been a member of the board of trustees for the lobbying group USACC (United States-Azerbaijan Chamber of Commerce).

Allison is a Fellow of the National Academy of Public Administration and a member of the Council on Foreign Relations.

Allison's proposed a "fourth US-China communique" at the 56th World Economic Forum, which was criticized in Taiwan for adopting pro-Beijing framing.

=== Defence analyst work ===
Allison has been heavily involved in U.S. defense policy since working as an advisor and consultant to the Pentagon in the 1960s, and has been consultant for the RAND Corporation. He has been a member of the Secretary of Defense's Defense Policy Board from 1985. He was a special advisor to Secretary of Defense Caspar Weinberger for three years in the second term of office of Ronald Reagan.

== Publications ==
=== Books ===
- Destined For War: Can America and China Escape Thucydides's Trap? Boston: Houghton Mifflin Harcourt (2017). ISBN 978-0544935273.
- Essence of Decision: Explaining the Cuban Missile Crisis. Little, Brown (1971). ISBN 0673394123.
  - 2nd ed., with Philip Zelikow. Longman (1999). ISBN 0321013492.

=== Articles ===
- "Trump Is Already Reshaping Geopolitics", Foreign Affairs, 16 January 2024
- "The Path to AI Arms Control", Foreign Affairs, 13 October 2023 (coauthored with Henry Kissinger)
- "The Myth of the Liberal Order: From Historical Accident to Conventional Wisdom", Foreign Affairs, vol. 97, no. 4, 2018, pp. 124–133.

== Wikipedia paid editing scandal ==
From 2012 to 2013, the Belfer Center (through the Wikimedia Foundation) paid an editor to cite Allison's scholarly writings in various articles. Funding for the position came from the Stanton Foundation, for which Graham Allison's wife, Liz Allison, was one of two trustees. The editor also made "supposedly problematic edits" based heavily on work of other scholars affiliated with the Belfer Center.

== See also ==
- Global policeman
- List of books about nuclear issues
- On Nuclear Terrorism
- The Four Faces of Nuclear Terrorism
- The Seventh Decade: The New Shape of Nuclear Danger

== Bibliography ==
- Allison, Graham (2015-09-24). "The Thucydides Trap: Are the U.S. and China Headed for War?", The Atlantic.
- Welch, David (1993). "Graham Allison". In American Political Scientists: A Dictionary, eds G. Utter and C. Lockhart. Greenwood Press.

=== Works ===
- 1969: "Conceptual Models and the Cuban Missile Crisis". American Political Science Review. 63(3): 689–718.
- 1971: Essence of Decision: Explaining the Cuban Missile Crisis. Little, Brown.
- 1972: "Bureaucratic Politics: A Paradigm and Some Policy Implications." World Politics. 24:40–79 (with Morton H. Halperin).
- 1976: Remaking Foreign Policy: The Organizational Connection. Basic Books (with Peter L. Szanton).
- 1983: Sharing International Responsibility Among the Trilateral Countries. Trilateral Commission (with Nobuhiko Ushiba and Thierry de Montbrial).
- 1985: Hawks, Doves and Owls: An Agenda for Avoiding Nuclear War. W.W. Norton. (edited with Albert Carnesale and Joseph Nye Jr).
- 1989: Windows of Opportunity: From Cold War to Peaceful Competition. Ballinger (edited with William Ury).
- 1992: Rethinking America's Security: Beyond Cold War to New World Order. W.W. Norton (edited with Gregory Treverton).
- 1996: Avoiding Nuclear Anarchy: Containing the Threat of Loose Russian Nuclear Weapons and Fissile Material. MIT Press.
- 2004: Nuclear Terrorism: The Ultimate Preventable Catastrophe. Henry Holt.
- 2013: Lee Kuan Yew: The Grand Master's Insights on China, the United States, and the World. MIT Press (with Robert D. Blackwill, Ali Wyne, and a foreword by Henry A. Kissinger).
- 2017: Destined for War: Can America and China Escape Thucydides's Trap?. Houghton Mifflin Harcourt.
