= Nuclear Terrorism: The Ultimate Preventable Catastrophe =

2004 book by Graham Allison

- Author: Graham Allison
- Subject: Nuclear terrorism
- Publisher: Times Books/Henry Holt
- Publication date: 2004
- Pages: 263 pp.
- ISBN: 978-0-8050-7651-6
- OCLC: 54865179

Nuclear Terrorism: The Ultimate Preventable Catastrophe is a 2004 book by Harvard scholar Graham Allison. Allison explains that terrorists have been striving to acquire and then use nuclear weapons against the United States. During the 2004 U.S. Presidential election, President George W. Bush and Senator John Kerry featured the issue of terrorism in their foreign policy platforms, and both said it is the nation's foremost security challenge. Nuclear Terrorism is described as a well-written report for general readers on the terrorist threat and what is needed to reduce it.

According to Warren Buffett in 2005:

This year I’ve asked The Bookworm to add Graham Allison’s Nuclear Terrorism: The Ultimate Preventable Catastrophe, a must-read for those concerned with the safety of our country.

== See also ==
- List of books about nuclear issues
- On Nuclear Terrorism
- The Four Faces of Nuclear Terrorism
- The Seventh Decade
