= Garwin =

Garwin can refer to:

- Laura Garwin (born 1957), American trumpeter and science journalist
- Richard Garwin (1928–2025), American physicist, father of Laura
- Garwin, Iowa, a town in the United States
- Garwin International, a company in Canada and USA
