= Indian military fiction =

Literary genre on Indian military

Indian military fiction refers to fiction about the Military of India or military fiction written by Indians.

== Literature ==
Some of the older books dealing with fictionalized scenarios for the Indian military and written by Indians were:

- "The Fourth Round: Indo-Pak war in 1984" by Ravi Rikhye. This 1982 book is a scenario for what an India-Pakistan war fought in 1984 might look like. Though it is no longer available, it will be republished in E-form in 2007.The war postulates Pakistan is about to succeed in its quest to develop nuclear weapons. An Indian air strike on its main R & D and enriched uranium production facilities at Kahuta leads to a retaliatory Pakistani strike against India's most powerful symbol, its parliament. India then declares war.

The Indian Army's Directorate of Military Intelligence recommended the book be banned on grounds it disclosed vital secrets. The Chief of Army Staff, however, declined such action primarily on the grounds that the book was simply interesting, harmless fun. The book was the first the author managed to get published: his first, Pakistan Rearmed (1973) was refused clearance. He refused to submit for clearance two other books writing during the 1975-77 Emergency. Subsequently, his Militarization of Mother India aroused no comment, but his The War That Never Was, an analysis of the 1986-87 army exercises Brasstacks, Trident, and Falcon – which were really covers for actual planned offensives led to investigations by various government agencies and harassment of the publisher.

- "Blind Men of Hindoostan" (1993) by General Krishnaswamy Sundararajan.

Among the newer books are:

- "Writing on the Wall" by General Sundararajan Padmanabhan. Unlike the other books it involves India fighting a war simultaneously with Pakistan while improving relations with China. On the other hand, the United States, to prevent a jihadi takeover in Pakistan, sends its Special Forces units to the aid of that country. The book ends with the detonation of an EMP device that disables the US communication networks and begins peace talks between the two nations. The book covers a period of several years while these changes occur and in this time the General delves into several non-fictional matters of India's internal security.
- "Kaalkut" by Jaidev Jamwal. This is an account of a war involving India, China and Pakistan and the events leading up to it. The war part is explained using accurate Order of Battle (ORBAT) of all three belligerents, terrain and other factors. He has published detailed ORBATs of China and Pakistani on his website and in an e-book, so it might be of interest to readers who care for such details. The story starts with seemingly unconnected incidents of international espionage, diplomacy and politics which grow increasingly hostile culminating in a bloody and costly war involving three nuclear powers. Same author has written two other books Flames & Arrows and Pinaka. Former is a more of a military pulp fiction full of exaggeration and satire while the latter is a fictionalised account of an Indian cross border raid on a Pakistani terrorist camp.
- "Op Kartikeya" by Airavat Singh. This is about a military operation named after the God of War (Kartikeya). Unlike the other books, it describes a massive pre-emptive air attack on the Pakistani armed forces backed by the landing of special battle groups in Gilgit and the Baluchistan coast. A rapid re-deployment of the IAF also checkmates Pakistan's closest ally China. This book was written in 2004 and depicts an integrated defence headquarters with an Air Chief Marshal as the Chief of Defence Staff.
- "Op Kartikeya-II": (Note: can be read for free on the author's website.) Titled Knockout, the story brings to conclusion the author's first novel, Op Kartikeya. Where the latter depicts the planning and execution of an air campaign by India, Knockout analyses the activities of the enemy on the ground. Most of the action also takes place on land with Indian Special Forces operating in the Pakistani province of Baluchistan in alliance with the local freedom-fighters. On the international stage the intervention of the US on India's side and the interception of Chinese merchant shipping by the Indians, prompts the Peoples Liberation Army to break its alliance with the Pakistani generals.
- "Line of Control" by Mainak Dhar was released in 2008 and paints a fictional scenario around an India-Pakistan conflict in 2011. As a backdrop, a fundamentalist regime has swept to power in Saudi Arabia and bankrolls another coup in Pakistan that brings to power a regime allied to it. Renewed and intensified terror attacks in India and an escalation in insurgency in Kashmir lead to a spiralling conflict on land, sea and air that bring the adversaries to the brink of a nuclear conflict. The focus is on the actual conduct of the combat operations as well as the behind the scenes manoeuvering to prevent a nuclear escalation.
- "Lashkar" series by Mukul Deva, India's "literary storm-trooper". This is a bestselling series of 4 books - Lashkar (HarperCollins, 2008), Salim Must Die (HarperCollins, 2009), Blowback (HarperCollins, 2010) and Tanzeem (HarperCollins, 2011). The motion picture rights of Lashkar have been purchased by Planman Motion Pictures.
- "Red Jihad: Battle for South Asia" (Rupa and Co.; 2012) was an award-winning military thriller by Sami A. Khan. Set in 2014, Red Jihad was the first novel to fictionalize a Maoist-Mujahideen nexus in the Red Corridor set in the backdrop of an India-Pakistan conflict.
- "Chimera" written by Texas-based Indian author Vivek Ahuja, narrates a fictional war between India and China in 2014.
- "The Shadow Throne" is a 2012 military fictional novel by Aroon Raman, staged about rogue R&AW agents who make alliance with their counter agents of ISI to plan a rain of missiles over both India and Pakistan, ending the long termed rivalry with their devastation, while operating from Afghanistan's Hindu Kush mountains; and the protagonist is an Indian journalist, Chandrashekhar who un wittingly gets dragged into it while investigating a murder in Qutb Minar, and also gets an accomplice of another ISI agent, for them to crack the advancing of the program of traitor of both nations.
