= Beit Warszawa =

Beit Warszawa may refer to the following Reform Jewish organizations operating in Warsaw, Poland:

== Synagogues ==
- Beit Warszawa Synagogue, a Reform synagogue located at 113 Wiertnicza Street, Warsaw

== Organizations ==
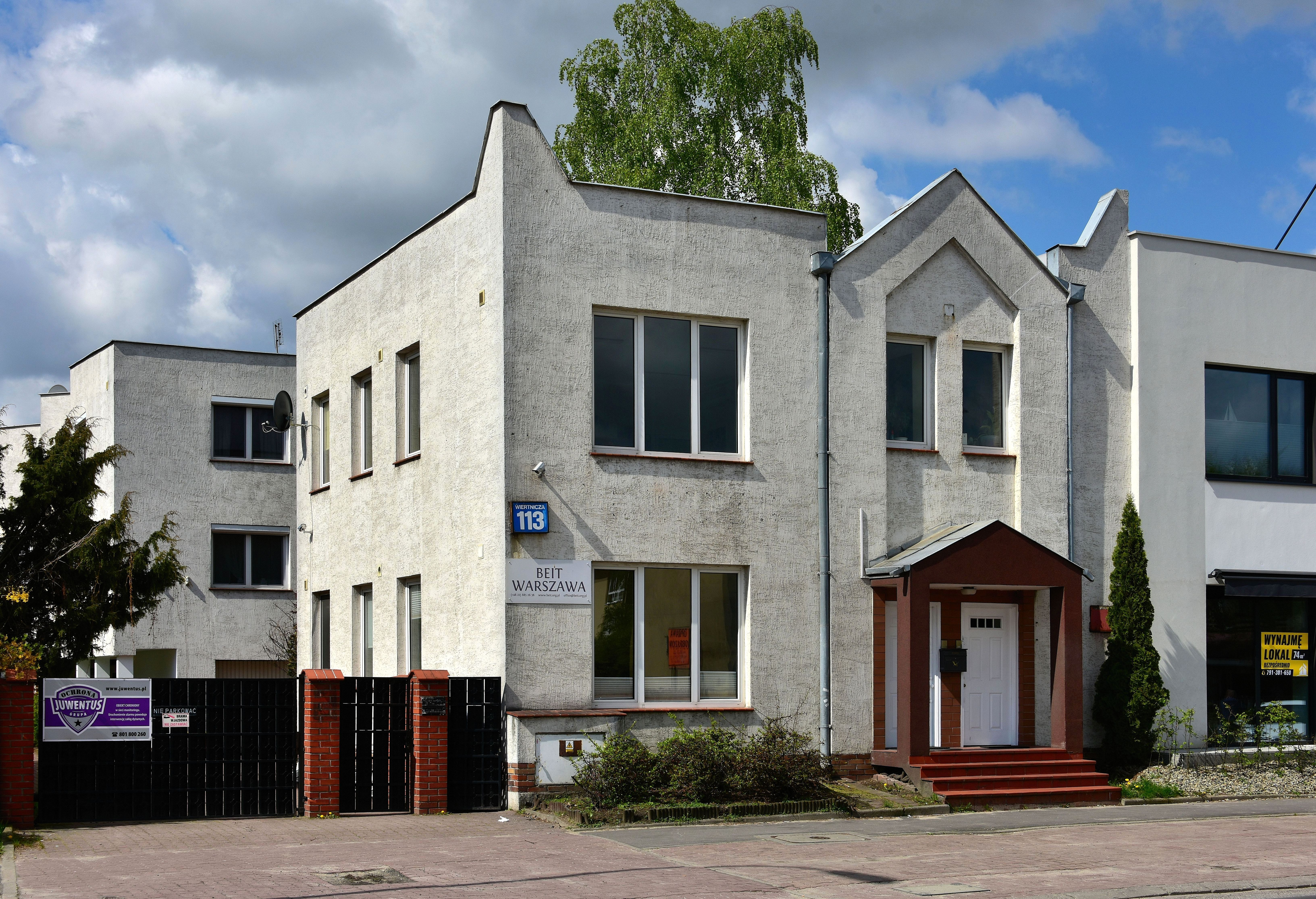
Headquarters of Beit Warszawa Foundation

- Foundation Beit Warszawa, a Reform community in Warsaw, that has operated as an independent charity since 2009 and whose chairman is Severyn Ashkenazy.
- Beit Warszawa Jewish Culture Association, a Jewish cultural association operating since 2002, whose chairman is Michael Levi.
- Beit Warszawa branch of Beit Polska, the Union of Progressive Jewish Communities (also known as Beit Warszawa) – a form community operating in Warsaw as a branch of the Beit Polska Religious Association, whose details are not public, according to the Polish Law of Religious Associations.
