= The Fate of the Earth =

1982 book by Jonathan Schell

- First edition
- Author: Jonathan Schell
- Subject: Consequences of nuclear war
- Genre: Nonfiction
- Publisher: Knopf
- Publication date: 1982
- Pages: 244 pages
- ISBN: 0394525590
- OCLC: 8280571

The Fate of the Earth is a 1982 book by Jonathan Schell. Its description of the consequences of nuclear war "forces even the most reluctant person to confront the unthinkable: the destruction of humanity and possibly most life on Earth". The work is regarded as a key document in the nuclear disarmament movement.

The book is composed of three essays, which originally ran in The New Yorker in three issues in February 1982. The first, "A Republic of Insects and Grass," is a description of the consequences of a nuclear holocaust. The second, "The Second Death," is metaphysical in nature, urging readers to respect the humanity and perhaps even the divinity of future generations, who will not be born due to the self-extermination of the human race. The third, "The Choice," describes the source of the nuclear threat as the nation-state system and argues that a choice must be made between national sovereignty and survival.

== Reviews and criticism ==
The Yale University sociologist Kai T. Erikson, reviewing the book in The New York Times, wrote, “This is a work of enormous force. There are moments when it seems to hurtle, almost out of control, across an extraordinary range of fact and thought. But in the end, it accomplishes what no other work has managed to do in the 37 years of the nuclear age. It compels us - and compel is the right word - to confront head on the nuclear peril in which we all find ourselves. In some regards, it is tempting to treat Jonathan Schell's achievement as an event of profound historical moment rather than as a book.”

Professor Erikson went on: “Throughout the whole of this marvelous work, Schell is vulnerable to charges of an almost romantic simplicity of vision—a risk that he, a seasoned observer of the human scene, must have known he was taking. This may be the price one has to pay for the attempt to enlarge perspectives and to turn away from 'crusted and hardened patterns of thought and feeling.’”

Psychologist David P. Barash described the book as “at once hauntingly lyrical and rigorously scientific, it details the effects on New York City, on the nation and on the prospects for continued human existence…a careful examination of the concept of extinction, its logical, ethical and scientific consequences. The prospect of human extinction is an idea we may speak of in passing, but most of us have never really explored its meaning, not even in imagination.”

In an unpublished review of The Fate of the Earth, the social scientist Brian Martin was skeptical of Schell's conclusions, positing that the author's argument that "most people" would die in the nuclear war was exaggerated, especially for the Global South. Martin wrote: "The perplexity is explained by Schell's process of continually taking worst interpretations and bending the evidence to give the worst impression. And usually when he spells out a worst case as a possibility—for example… a 10,000 Mt attack on the United States—this becomes implicitly a certainty for later discussion, with qualifications dropped."

In the book, Schell appeared to have anticipated such criticism. "To say that human extinction is a certainty would, of course, be a misrepresentation—just as it would be a misrepresentation to say that extinction can be ruled out," he wrote. "To begin with, we know that a holocaust may not occur at all. If one does occur, the adversaries may not use all their weapons. If they do use all their weapons, the global effects, in the ozone and elsewhere, may be moderate. And if the effects are not moderate but extreme, the ecosphere may prove resilient enough to withstand them without breaking down catastrophically". (pp. 93–94.)

More generally, Schell's analysis of the effects of a full-scale nuclear exchange proceeds from a stance of cognitive modesty: "In weighing the fate of the earth and, with it, our own fate, we stand before a mystery, and in tampering with the earth we tamper with a mystery. We are in deep ignorance. Our ignorance should dispose us to wonder, our wonder should make us humble, our humility should inspire us to reverence and caution, and our reverence and caution should lead us to act without delay to withdraw the threat we now pose to the earth and to ourselves." (p. 95)

== In popular culture ==
- In the 1985 Infocom interactive fiction game A Mind Forever Voyaging, The Fate of the Earth is on the list of banned books, tapes, and programs issued by the Morality Bureau of the government in Rockvil's Main Library in the 2071 simulation.

== See also ==
- List of books about nuclear issues
- Nuclear War: A Scenario
- Nuclear winter
- On Nuclear Terrorism
