= The Four Faces of Nuclear Terrorism =

2004 book by Charles Ferguson and William Potter

- Author: Charles D Ferguson; William C Potter; Amy Sands
- Subject: Nuclear terrorism
- Publication date: 2004
- Pages: 376 pp.
- ISBN: 978-0-415-95243-9
- OCLC: 57965807

The Four Faces of Nuclear Terrorism is a 2004 book by Charles D. Ferguson and William C. Potter (with Amy Sands, Leonard S. Spector and Fred L. Wehling) which explores the motivations and capabilities of terrorist organizations to carry out significant attacks using stolen nuclear weapons, to construct and detonate crude nuclear weapons, to release radiation by attacking or sabotaging nuclear facilities, and to build and use radiological weapons or "dirty bombs." The authors argue that these "four faces" of nuclear terrorism are real threats which U.S. policy has failed to take into account. The book is the result of a two-year study by the Monterey Institute's Center for Nonproliferation Studies.

== See also ==
- List of books about nuclear issues
- Nuclear Terrorism: The Ultimate Preventable Catastrophe
- On Nuclear Terrorism
- The Seventh Decade
