= Dorothy Nelkin =

American sociologist of science

- Born: July 30, 1933; Boston, United States
- Died: May 28, 2003 (aged 69); Manhattan, United States
- Education: Cornell University
- Known for: Relationship between science and society
- Awards: John Desmond Bernal Prize (1988)
- Scientific career
- Fields: Sociology
- Workplaces: Cornell University; New York University

Dorothy Wolfers Nelkin (July 30, 1933 – May 28, 2003) was an American sociologist of science most noted for her work researching and chronicling interplay between science, technology and the general public. Her work often highlighted the ramifications of unchecked scientific advances and potential threats to privacy and civil liberties. She was the author or co-author of 26 books, including Selling Science: How the Press Covers Science and Technology, The Molecular Gaze: Art in the Genetic Age, and Body Bazaar: The Market for Human Tissue in the Biotechnology Age.

Nelkin served on governmental and other advisory boards such as the National Center for Science Education, the United States Human Genome Project, and the Society for Social Studies of Science. Nelkin also wrote about creation science and, in 1981, testified for the plaintiffs in McLean v. Arkansas. Nelkin often addressed the legal community, political leaders, and the general public on issues concerning science studies, bioethics, and the public assessment of science and technology.

== Early life and education ==
Nelkin was born on July 30, 1933, to a Jewish family in Boston, Massachusetts, and grew up in Brookline, Massachusetts. Her mother was a homemaker and her father, Henry L. Wolfers, founded Wolfers Lighting Company in Boston. Nelkin was the first member of her family to attend college.

Nelkin earned a B.A. from the Department of Philosophy at Cornell University in 1954. After earning her degree, Nelkin devoted nearly a decade to home life and motherhood before returning to Cornell in 1963. By the 1970s, Nelkin was a research associate at Cornell. She held this position for several years before being awarded a full professorship, despite having no other formal credentials besides the B.A. In 1987, Nelkin left Cornell to join New York University (NYU) as a visiting professor. By 1990, she was a university professor at NYU and a member of the Law School faculty.

== Career ==
Nelkin began her career by researching the experiences of African-American migrant farm workers in New York State. Her work then turned to issues of nuclear power and the role scientists play in public decision making. This experience sparked a long-term interest in public controversies.

Nelkin testified in an Arkansas creationism trial, which she stated was "one of a series of exercises to get religion back into schools." Nelkin wrote about creation science in Science Textbook Controversies and the Politics of Equal Time and, later The Creation Controversy: Science or Scripture in the Schools, warning that limited public understanding of science made them vulnerable to groups that "try to use science as a means to establish their own legitimacy".

As her career progressed, Nelkin focused on the "uneasy relationship" between science, technology, and society. She wrote about media influences on science and technology in Selling Science: How the Press Covers Science and Technology. This work led to an interest in biomedicine, the aesthetic of DNA, and civil liberties. Her book The DNA Mystique: The Gene as a Cultural Icon, co-written with Susan Lindee, was used as a teaching text. She followed up with two other books, Body Bazaar: The Market for Human Tissue in the Biotechnology Age with Lori Andrews, and The Molecular Gaze: Art in the Genetic Age with Suzanne Anker.

Nelkin served as an advisor to the United States government's Human Genome Project, among other policy boards and assessment panels internationally. She was a founding member of the Editorial Advisory Board of the journal Public Understanding of Science. She also served on the Advisory Council for the National Center for Science Education, as well as on editorial boards for journals in sociology, science studies, law, history and public health.

== Science studies ==
Nelkin became interested in the issues of nuclear power when, in 1967, New York State Electric & Gas (NYSE&G) proposed to build a nuclear power plant on Cayuga Lake. She wrote Nuclear Power and its Critics: The Cayuga Lake Controversy (1971) as a case study sponsored by the Cornell University's Program on Science, Technology and Society. The book documented the differing stakeholder perspectives, including scientists from Cornell University, the Citizen's Committee to Save Cayuga Lake, representatives from the Atomic Energy Commission, New York State Department of Health, and NYSE&G. Critics noted the book was a "painstaking history" that may not be "useful or interesting" to the general reader, but valuable in that it posed questions about the role of scientists in public debate, as well as how the scientific dimension was portrayed in the media. This project marked the beginning of Nelkin's long-term interest in public controversies, including sound pollution in relation to Logan Airport, creationism, atomic power, and the application and management of technology.

== Creation science ==
Nelkin's book, Science Textbook Controversies and the Politics of Equal Time (MIT, 1977), documented the "religious and cultural war" of the early 1970s in which religious groups in the United States challenged the teaching of evolution in school textbooks and argued in favor of "creation-science". As one critic wrote, Nelkin was "sympathetic, but alarmed" at what she considered a "growth of intolerance, a new rigidity in values".

In 1982, Nelkin followed up with The Creation Controversy: Science or Scripture in the Schools. In it, she documented various state and local conflicts over science textbooks and the teaching of biological evolution. These issues included local control, public participation in the assessment of science and technology, and the increasingly disputed role of expertise in public policy". Nelkin asserted that fundamentalists focus on education because it is one area where parents can "exert control over their lives and families". According to Nelkin, there is a link between creationism and areas of high technology", with some creationists representing themselves as scientists. This rising interest in creation science, according to Nelkin, was an outcropping of popular anxieties about science and technology. One critic called the book "balanced" and "richly factual", but expressed concerns that Nelkin's approach did not take into account differences among religious beliefs saying, "Such a sociological approach accordingly misses the subtleties of the religious issues that must be considered to explain creation-science."

Biologists and creationists alike claim the other bases its beliefs on faith; each group argues with passion for its own dispassionate objectivity; and each bemoans the moral, political and legal implications of the alternative ideology.

— Dorothy Nelkin

== Science and the press ==
In Selling Science: How the Press Covers Science and Technology, Nelkin explored the cultural pressures which shape the reporting of science in the popular press. It reflects her concern about "science by press conference". She posited that scientists and journalists have differing agendas that cause a "distortion of scientific progress". The culture of journalism and pressures to respond to events causes the superficiality or oversimplification of science reporting in the press, raising concerns when scientific breakthroughs and calamities (e.g., AIDS, Three Mile Island, the Challenger Disaster) are overstated. The scientific community, on the other hand, deals with the "continuous process of research". Their distrust of reporters and promotion of their own work to get funding are factors which contribute to the problem. While critics found the book to be "lucid, readable and painless", and "a very good description of the way science journalism is practiced today, to some, it offered "little in the way of prescription for better science reportage".

In reporting each finding, the media often does not convey the message that the scientific process is not certain and that the finding is tentative and may in fact be turned around by other studies or even by closer examination of the same data. The public needs to know that a scientific finding is the best guess at the moment, it is not the final truth.

— Dorothy Nelkin

== Biomedicine ==
Dangerous Diagnostics: The Social Power of Biological Information, a book Nelkin co-wrote with Lawrence Tancredi, was critically viewed as provocative and explored issues with biomedicine, including the use and misuse of biological information. The authors expressed concern that medical and psychological information, obtained in educational and medical settings, would be used by insurance companies, schools, workplaces, and courts to profile people. These concerns raise issues of civil liberties, human integrity, and personal privacy in the form of institutionalized social control.

== DNA ==
In The DNA Mystique: The Gene as a Cultural Icon, with co-writer Susan Lindee, Nelkin explored how the gene was being defined and exploited by popular culture. The authors argue that the gene, as a cultural icon, has become a sacred entity – almost magical and mythical – and is being used to "explore fundamental questions about human life, to define the essence of human existence, and to imagine immortality". The authors researched how the media (e.g., books, newspapers, magazine and journal articles, movies, and comic books) impacted genetic ideas within popular culture. The book covers reproductive issues, eugenics, genetic discrimination (e.g., by insurance companies, educational settings, and workplaces), intelligence, criminal behavior, homosexuality, and addiction. While the book received support from critics overall, some called for "fewer examples and a more systematic analysis" of the issues.

== Personal life ==
Nelkin was married to physicist Mark S Nelkin, and they had a daughter, Lisa. Nelkin died of cancer on May 28, 2003.

== Awards and honors ==
- Guggenheim Fellowship (1984)
- John Desmond Bernal Prize of the Society for the Social Studies of Science (1988)
- Institute of Medicine of the National Academy of Sciences (1993)
- John McGovern Award of the American Medical Writers Association (2000)

== Selected publications ==
- On the Season: Aspects of the Migrant Labor System (1970). New York State School of Industrial and Labor Relations, Cornell University.
- The University and Military Research: Moral Politics at MIT (1972). Cornell University Press. ISBN 0-8014-0711-7
- Jetport: The Boston Airport Controversy (1975). Transaction Books. ISBN 0-87855-591-9
- Science Textbook Controversies and the Politics of Equal Time (1977). MIT Press. ISBN 0-262-64017-1
- The Atom Besieged: Extra-Parliamentary Dissent in France and Germany (with Michael Pollak; 1981). MIT Press. ISBN 0-262-64021-X
- The Creation Controversy: Science or Scripture in the Schools (1982). New York: W.W. Norton. ISBN 0-8070-3155-0
- Workers at Risk: Voices from the workplace (with M.S. Brown; 1984). Chicago: University of Chicago Press. ISBN 0-226-57128-9
- The Language of Risk: Conflicting Perspectives in Occupational Health (1985). SAGE Publications. ISBN 0-8039-2467-4
- Selling Science: How the press covers science and technology (1987). W.H., Freeman Press. Translated into Japanese and Spanish. ISBN 0-7167-2595-9
- Dangerous Diagnostics (1989). New York: Basic. ISBN 0-226-57129-7
- A Disease of Society: The Cultural Response to AIDS (with D. Willis, eds.; 1991). Cambridge U. Press. ISBN 0-521-40743-5
- The Animal Rights Crusade (with James M. Jasper; 1991). Free Press. ISBN 0-02-916195-9
- The Body Bazaar: The Market for Human Tissue in the Biotechnology (2001). Age Crown Books. Translated into Korean, Chinese, Japanese, and Italian. ISBN 0-609-60540-2
- The Molecular Gaze (with Suzanne Anker; 2003). Cold Spring Harbor Press. ISBN 0-87969-697-4
