= The Gift of Time: The Case for Abolishing Nuclear Weapons Now =

1998 book by Jonathan Schell

- Author: Jonathan Schell
- Publisher: Henry Holt & Co.
- Publication date: 1998

The Gift of Time: The Case for Abolishing Nuclear Weapons Now is a 1998 book by Jonathan Schell.

== See also ==
- List of books about nuclear issues
- Nuclear disarmament
- Anti-nuclear movement
