= The Psychology of Nuclear Proliferation =

2006 book by Jacques E. C. Hymans

The Psychology of Nuclear Proliferation: Identity, Emotions, and Foreign Policy
- Author: Jacques E. C. Hymans
- Publisher: Cambridge University Press
- Publication date: 2006

The Psychology of Nuclear Proliferation: Identity, Emotions, and Foreign Policy is a 2006 book by Jacques E. C. Hymans, published by Cambridge University Press.

== See also ==
- List of books about nuclear issues
- List of nuclear whistleblowers
- Nuclear disarmament
- Nuclear weapons
