= Canada's Deadly Secret =

2007 book by Jim Harding

Canada's Deadly Secret: Saskatchewan Uranium and the Global Nuclear System
- Author: Jim Harding
- Language: English
- Subject: Nuclear industry
- Genre: Non fiction
- Publisher: Fernwood Publishing
- Publication date: October 1, 2007
- Publication place: Canada
- Media type: Print
- Pages: 272
- ISBN: 978-1552662267

Canada's Deadly Secret: Saskatchewan Uranium and the Global Nuclear System is a 2007 book by Jim Harding which chronicles the struggle over Saskatchewan's uranium mining, and demonstrates the negative impacts on Aboriginal rights and environmental health, and the effect of free trade. Harding argues that nuclear energy cannot mitigate global warming and that the "peaceful nuclear technology" does not exist. Helen Caldicott wrote the foreword to the book.

Jim Harding is an emeritus professor of environmental and justice studies and was director of research for Prairie Justice Research at the University of Regina. He is a founding member of the Regina Group for a Non-Nuclear Society and International Uranium Congress. Harding also acted as Prairie Correspondent for Nuclear Free Press and consultant to the award-winning film Uranium, a 1990 documentary about uranium mining in Canada.

Several reviews of the book have been published.

== See also ==
- List of books about nuclear issues
- Nuclear disarmament
- Anti-nuclear movement
