= Nuclear Politics in America =

1997 book by Robert J. Duffy

- Author: Robert J. Duffy
- Language: English
- Genre: Non-fiction
- Publisher: University Press of Kansas
- Publication date: 1997
- Media type: Print
- Pages: 336
- ISBN: 978-0700608539

Nuclear Politics in America is a 1997 book by Robert J. Duffy. According to Duffy, the "promise and peril of nuclear power have been a preoccupation of the modern age", who was then an assistant professor of political science at Rider University.

The book discusses the controversy over radioactive waste disposal, licensing procedures relating to the Atomic Energy Act, and the effects of deregulation of electric utilities. By analysing policy frameworks and describing the process by which regulatory change occurs, Nuclear Politics in America offers a perspective on policymaking in America.

== See also ==
- List of books about nuclear issues
- List of nuclear whistleblowers
- Nuclear power in the United States
