= Kenji Higuchi =

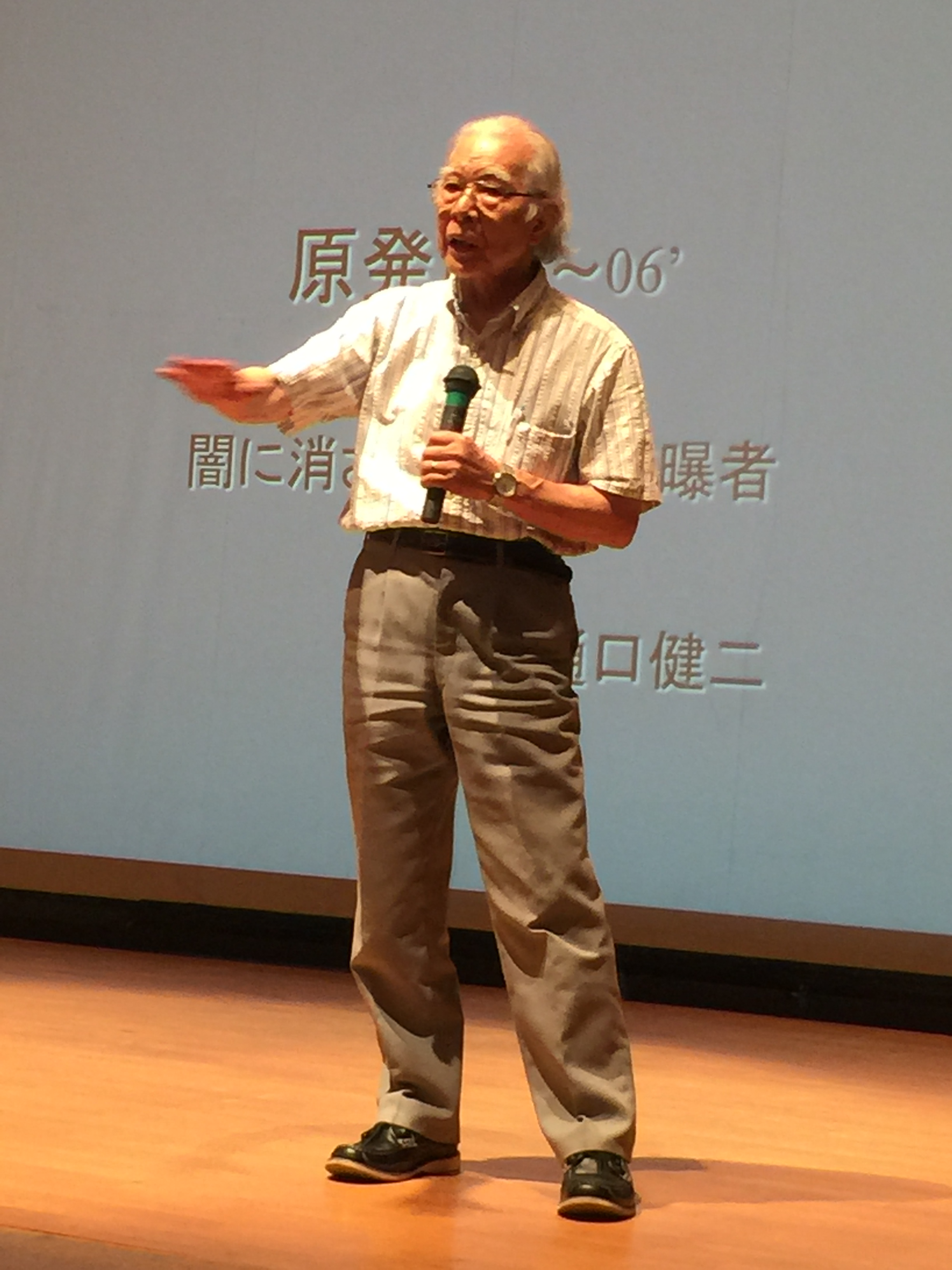
Kenji Higuchi in 2015

Kenji Higuchi (樋口 健二, Higuchi Kenji; born March 10, 1937) has been a professor of photography at several institutions in Tokyo, and an instructor at the Nippon Photography Institute (日本写真芸術専門学校, Nihon Shashin Geijutsu Senmon Gakkō). He is the eldest son of a farmer and at the age of 24 took up photography after viewing Robert Capa's famous war photos. He published some of the first images of nuclear workers toiling inside a reactor in 1977. Higuchi's photos mainly depict people and situations associated with nuclear issues and he won a Nuclear-Free Future Award.

Higuchi has documented the struggles of radiation victims and, over a half-century, has written 19 books, including The Truth About Nuclear Plants and Erased Victims. Since the 2011 Fukushima I nuclear accidents his work has gained more attention.

From 2013 - Started producing "Mamademo", a team of single mothers.

Because Higuchi can't use PC. Members of Mamademo have been working everything instead of him.

Mamademo" is an activist team for women's rights, nuclear power, radiation exposure, and environmental protection. Mamademo has been producing lectures, photo exhibitions, and collaborative projects with Higuchi, and has been enhancing its website and other social media. Kenji Higuchi - Photojournalist who has continued to photograph nuclear power plants and A-bombed workers" on NHK. In September 2014, he held his first photo exhibition and lecture in South Korea. Invited to give a lecture at the Japan-Korea Nuclear Workshop.

All since 2013: Creation, management, composition, planning, production, photo panelization, layout, etc. of the website of the activist team "Mamademo" (led by Chieko Uozumi, Aya Hirooka, and Mineko Mokudai - later 1/2History project). Uozumi also plans to promote Higuchi's books, photo collections, and achievements to overseas countries, such as the UK, Taiwan, Korea, France, Germany, Poland, etc., and to receive interviews. However it has some problems, they completely volunteers, recently Power harassment to them by him is a big problem in Japan. Japan has male and female dominance.

https://happymamademo.jimdofree.com/

(Mamadem Website)

On March 11, 2017, Chieko Uozumi, representative of 1/2History (since 2013 . Kenji Higuchi, certified photo manager and photo panelist, participated in a demonstration against nuclear power plants in Düsseldorf, Germany. In conjunction with this,

With the great cooperation of Sayonara Nukes Düsseldorf (representative: Daishin Bontaka Takaoka, interpreter: Kazuko Kanuma, and many others), a lecture by Kenji Higuchi and a photo exhibition (3 months long run) were held at Ecotop and other churches. Then, in London, England, at the invitation of JapaneseAgainstNukes, Higuchi and Uozumi gave a lecture (Higuchi) and a speech (Uozumi) as a mother activist, respectively, on radiation exposure of nuclear power plant workers at the Houses of Parliament.

In 2019/Feb~Apr, Kenji Higuchi photo exhibition by SayonaraNukesDuesseldorf.

. https://rp-online.de/nrw/staedte/duesseldorf/sayonara-nukes-duesseldorf- aktivistinnen-kaempfen-gegen-atomokraft_aid-37670363 (SND Website)

January 11 - March 29, 2020, Kenji Higuchi Photo Exhibition "Fuji and Foothills" at PlazaGallery, Chofu, Tokyo.

From May 2020, Kenji Higuchi's photo exhibition and lectures organized by SayonaraNukesDuesseldorf, and other lectures in Europe (postponed to 2021 due to the global Coronavirus Pandemic). ~Photographs and interviews related to nuclear power plants are posted semi-permanently on the website of the German Bell Foundation (negotiated): https://www.boell.de/fukushima-ist-noch-nicht-geschichte (In the Bell Foundation website, under Mr. Higuchi's portrait, click on the photo. (You can also read the article in Japanese by clicking on the picture below Higuchi's picture on the Bell Foundation website).

== See also ==
- Robert Del Tredici
