= The Unfinished Twentieth Century =

2001 book by Jonathan Schell

- First edition
- Author: Jonathan Schell
- Publisher: Verso
- Publication date: August 2001
- Pages: 144 pp
- ISBN: 978-1-85984-780-0
- OCLC: 48012948
- LC Class: JZ5665 .S34 2001

In the 2001 book The Unfinished Twentieth Century, author Jonathan Schell suggests that an essential feature of the twentieth century was the development of humankind's capacity for self-destruction, with the rise in many forms of "policies of extermination". Schell goes on to suggest that the world now faces a clear choice between the abolition of all nuclear weapons, and full nuclearization, as the necessary technology and materials diffuse around the globe.

== See also ==
- List of books about nuclear issues
- Nuclear disarmament
