= The Cult of the Atom =

1982 book by Daniel Ford

The Cult of the Atom: The Secret Papers of the Atomic Energy Commission
- Author: Daniel Ford
- Language: English
- Genre: Non-fiction
- Publication date: 1982

The Cult of the Atom: The Secret Papers of the Atomic Energy Commission is a 1982 book by Daniel Ford.

The Cult of the Atom is a piece of political literature that discusses issues brought up by the nuclear disarmament movement.

== See also ==
- List of books about nuclear issues
- Three Mile Island: Thirty Minutes to Meltdown
