= Three Mile Island: Thirty Minutes to Meltdown =

1982 book by Daniel Ford

- Author: Daniel Ford
- Language: English
- Genre: Non-fiction
- Publisher: Viking
- Publication date: 1982
- Publication place: United States
- ISBN: 978-0-670-70859-8

Three Mile Island: Thirty Minutes to Meltdown is a 1982 book by Daniel Ford. Ford presents a "meticulous post-mortem of the events that nearly led to a meltdown" at the Metropolitan Edison station near Harrisburg in March 1979. He analyzes the complex of people, technology, customs and regulations involved. Ford identifies regulatory failure and industry cost-cutting as the underlying causes of the Three Mile Island accident.

Daniel Ford is an economist and former director of the Union of Concerned Scientists.

== See also ==
- List of books about nuclear issues
- The Cult of the Atom
- Three Mile Island: A Nuclear Crisis in Historical Perspective
- Three Mile Island accident health effects
- Robert Del Tredici
