= The Unconquerable World =

2003 book by Jonathan Schell

- First edition
- Author: Jonathan Schell
- Publisher: Henry Holt & Co.
- Publication date: 2003

The Unconquerable World: Power, Nonviolence, and The Will of the People is a book on the power of nonviolence by Jonathan Schell published in 2003.

Schell starts by discussing the cultural embeddedness of men, patriotism and death in battle (going back to the Athenian - Pericles). From this classic root political morality has held onto the need for 'standing up for principles with force', which in practice quickly descends to "plunder, exploitation and massacre".

In the 5th century, St. Augustine conjoined this with Christian love... by theorising 'separate realms' for political and religious morality. Politics has thus long been wedded to violence... it is hard to conceptualise a political ideology that does not have a resort to violence clause. As Schell says there has been, "an age old reliance of politics on violent means". (p. 4)

Schell then puts forward his main thesis that "violence has now become dysfunctional as a political instrument" (p. 7) and that "forms of non-violent action can serve effectively in the place of violence at every level of political affairs". (p. 8)

The key political progress has been the idea of democracy - even the worst democracy - carries within it the principle of equality which is a deeply seated contradiction to an also deeply embedded practice of inequality - see Tocqueville. Ironically modern national democracy allowed for a new kind of army, in which it was possible to mobilise masses of men prepared to die - apparently in defence of their own national interest and the principle of democracy. The disaster of the modern war system was fed by an unholy confluence of democracy, science, industrial revolution, and imperialism which developed through the 19th century.

== Power ==
Power came to be widely defined by the ability to wage war. He describes imperialism as "a monotonous record of one sided slaughter" (p. 75) He argues that there was an end of limited war between 'great powers' after 1870 (p. 44). After that we had 1914 and the period of total or world war until 1946. Then the period of Cold War in which the public appearances of a strategic balance of power became more important than the reality of a balance of actual power. The A-bomb made a balance of actual power obsolete (p. 62).

== People's war - wars of national self-determination ==
The first modern people's war was the Spanish resistance to the French invasion 1807-14 (p. 68). A people's war that showed how a superior force can be worn down by lesser military strength contrary to the classic rules of conventional warfare. The main need was to endure, and an armed population. George Washington also understood this need to endure. "Washington was always aware that his most important task was to insure the survival of his own forces - not strictly for military purposes but to personify the unconquerable will of the American people" (p. 157).

The big downside of people's war is that the whole people then become subject to retaliation (p. 81). In the Japanese retaliation against the Chinese communists, the population in North China dropped from 45 million to 25 million. With this level of violence, political ideals are what buoys the resistance up. It also allowed humanitarian treatment of prisoners by the communist forces to be maintained.

In a people's war it is important that war is kept subordinate to politics. This is the first stage of extracting politics from the war machine. Politics here means the creation of a civil administration from the ground up. For Mao the most important goal and foundation of this politics was the redistribution of land from rich to poor.

A militarised politics can easily segue into a totalitarian politics as it did in China via conventional warfare against the American-backed Kuomintang.

People's war became the principal instrument of self-determination and social change in the third world from around the 1950s. If a population is united, an imperial war against it is difficult to win. Charles de Gaulle understood this in relation to Algerian War in 1958. Even when he had achieved a military victory it did not lead to a political one.

== Cold war ==
The nuclear standoff produced a stalemate in the war system. The last resort was unusable. '"In both (nuclear deterrence and people war) violence became not so much an instrument for producing physical effects as a kind of bloody system of communication, through which the antagonists produced messages to one another about will." (p. 97) Nuclear deterrence became a conflict waged by appearances to produce intangible effects on leaderships and populations. People's war also came to be decided by intangible effects on hearts and minds of both sides. In both situations the capacity of violence for achieving political ends is thrown into doubt.

== Revolution ==
A similar mindset of belief in violence pervaded western theories of revolution. Right, left and centre theorists and leaders agreed that that revolution had to be violent. Power was only understood as an effect of violent coercive rule. (except for a few voices, e.g., Tolstoy)

Two expressly political theorists thought consistently about nonviolence: Mahatma Gandhi and Hannah Arendt.

== Mohandas K. Gandhi ==
Mohandas K. Gandhi believed that courage was a more important attribute of those seeking liberation than a desire for nonviolence or Satyagraha. At one point he even acted as conscription agent for the British military in South Africa. (date?) Gandhi appealed to the 'spiritual' strength of Indian peoples to oppose the Western Imperial (war) system.

The assumption here is that tyrants and ruling classes alike only have the power that we invest in them. Give them nothing and they are naked and have no power. "The central role of consent in all government meant that non-cooperation - the withdrawal of consent - was something more than a morally satisfying activity; it was a powerful weapon in the real world." (p. 129) "Non-cooperation is not a passive state, it is an intensely active state - more active than physical resistance or violence."' (p. 130) Schell quoting from Gandhi's Essential Writings (p. 99)

The Gandhi programme of Satyagraha ("the quiet and irresistible pursuit of truth") was accompanied by 'the constructive programme'. This campaigned and organised to achieve concrete goals such as justice for workers, peace between factions, village hygiene and diet, the condition of women, etc. The idea is to do anything that obstructed the solidarity of the nation and that facilitates the production of a democratic political culture. "Constructive effort is political power" Gandhi's Essential Writings (p. 259)

== Revolutions and violence ==
Schell looks for the nonviolent actions that are part of what are often represented as broadly violent revolutions. (p. 143) He defines violence: "Violence is the method by which the ruthless few can subdue the passive many. Non-violence is a means by which the active many can overcome the ruthless few." (p. 144). He discusses The Glorious Revolution of 1689 in England and the American, French and Russian Revolutions. He makes the interesting observation that revolutions are typified as violent and the subsequent establishment of a new regime is assumed to be peaceful, whereas the reverse has "more often been the case". (p. 144) in the French revolution, the American, even the Russian...(p. 175) (p. 178). More people died making Potemkin the film than in the actual storming of the Winter Palace! The Russian Revolution was more of a victory of a 'mass minority' ... than a real people's revolution as happened in France or America (p. 183).

The English 'Glorious Revolution' of 1689 "London was in fact the first of many modern capitals whose rebellious spirit was to infect and destroy the allegiance of an army of an ancien regime". This was William of Orange versus King James, with defections at the non-battle at Salisbury.

There has been a near universal failure of theorists to predict the non-violent fall of powers. He quotes Thomas Paine: "Tis not in numbers but in unity that our great strength lies". In the American Revolution Committees of Correspondence were formed for "mutually fostering and co-ordinating activity". These were the basic political units.

Edmund Burke realised that it is only by cultivating the love and admiration of the people that a ruler can raise taxes or an army or get voted in. This love "infuses into (army and navy) that liberal obedience without which your army would be base rabble and you navy nothing but rotten timber" (p. 159).

== East Europe ==
Schell's sources here are Adam Michnik, Václav Havel and György Konrád as sources to explain the 'unsuspected' weakness of the Soviet empire. In their beginnings they "did not aim at state power" (p. 191) but aimed at "achieving immediate changes in daily life" within what was called 'civil society' a term that goes back to Paine. (p. 194)

The setting up of institutions independent from the state or the ruling classes... is the key activity in preparing for a peoples revolution. In Eastern Europe this took the form of civic and cultural activity (p. 195), e.g., Workers' Defence Committee provided concrete assistance to those in trouble with the authorities, and their families. Other terms for similar activity:

- flying university
- parallel structures
- second culture
- revolutionary councils' (Arendt)

Václav Havel suggested there should be no discourse with the centre of power but that activists should "fight only for those concrete causes, and fight for them unswervingly to the end" (p. 196). Compare this with Gandhi's earlier call for courage . Chosen well these independent institutions will rattle the establishment. The idea of cultivating 'a predisposition to truth' (Havel/ Gandhi) is seen as key (p. 197).

The final collapse of the USSR is not like the rest of Eastern Europe as it was a mainly top down operation rather than one of peoples power. There was still a remarkable and unexpected lack of violence. In particular, August 1991 coup attempt failed due to mostly non-violent civil resistance.

The main thesis is reiterated: "The professionals of power, in or out of government, were consistently caught off-guard by the failures of superior force and the successes of nonviolence" (p. 216). Contemporary political theory could 'neither foresee nor explain' the successes of non-violent people power.

== Hannah Arendt's ideas of power ==
Hannah Arendt's redefinition of the word 'power' has a strong echo from Paine. She says: "Power corresponds to the human ability not just to act but to act in concert." (Schell p. 218). She goes so far as to deny ascription of 'power' to individual action.

Max Weber is probably more realistic in asserting that power is the assertion of will in a social relationship. (p. 220) But this does mean that in limiting its meaning Hannah Arendt can discuss political power in more detail. The assertion of the will of the tyrant is ultimately an illusion, the tyrant is dependent on his supporters. Violence can never create real political power in Arendt's sense: "To substitute violence for power can bring victory, but the price is very high; for it is not only paid by the vanquished, it is also paid by the victor in terms of his own power." (Schell p. 222). According to John Stuart Mill public opinion guides will and "a great part of all power consists in... willing allegiance" (Schell p. 229).

== Nonviolent change in liberal democracy? ==
Schell sees the 'taming of violence' being written into liberalisms 'genetic code'. His example is the Civil Rights Movement in the US as nonviolent action being only 'curative' or reforming of a liberal democratic system.
