= Megawatts and Megatons =

2001 book by Richard Garwin and Georges Charpak

- Authors: Richard L. Garwin and Georges Charpak
- Language: English
- Genre: Non-fiction
- Publisher: University of Chicago Press
- Publication date: October 2001
- Media type: Print (Hardcover)
- ISBN: 978-0226284279

Megawatts and Megatons is a book on the consequences and applications of nuclear physics written by physicists Richard L. Garwin and Georges Charpak. First published in 2001, the book explores nuclear weapons, nuclear power, and nonproliferation. In particular, it explores nuclear power programs in the United States and France.

== See also ==
- Accelerator-driven sub-critical reactor
- Energy amplifier
- List of books about nuclear issues
- Megatons to Megawatts Program
- Nuclear disarmament
