= Mark Nelkin =

American theoretical physicist

Mark S. Nelkin
- Occupation: Theoretical physicist

Mark Samuel Nelkin (born 12 May 1931) is an American theoretical physicist.

Under the direction of Professor Hans Bethe, he received his Ph.D. in theoretical physics from Cornell University in 1955. From 1955 to 1962 he worked in the nuclear industry for General Electric in Schenectady and General Atomic in San Diego. In 1962 he became a member of the Cornell faculty. He was awarded a Guggenheim Fellowship in 1968. He retired from Cornell University as professor emeritus in 1993. After retirement he moved to New York City and remained active in refereeing articles for Physical Review Letters, Physical Review E, The Physics of Fluids, and the Journal of Fluid Mechanics.

He spent leaves from Cornell at the University of Paris, The Collège de France in Paris, The National Bureau of Standards in Gaithersburg, Maryland, Harvard University, and the Courant Institute of Mathematical Sciences at New York University. At the Collège de France in 1976, he gave a series of twelve lectures on turbulence at the invitation of Pierre Gilles de Gennes.

Nelkin became a Fellow of the American Physical Society in 1984, having been nominated by their Division of Fluid Dynamics, for contributions to the advancement of physics by strong theoretical contributions in four areas beginning with the physics of thermal neutrons and its applications to nuclear reactors, kinetic theory of fluctuations in fluids, turbulence, and 1/f noise.

Nelkin was married to the American sociologist of science Dorothy Nelkin until her death in 2003.

== Publications ==
- Does Kolmogorov mean field theory become exact for turbulence above some critical dimension?
