= Jonathan Schell =

American author and advocate against nuclear weapons (1943–2014)

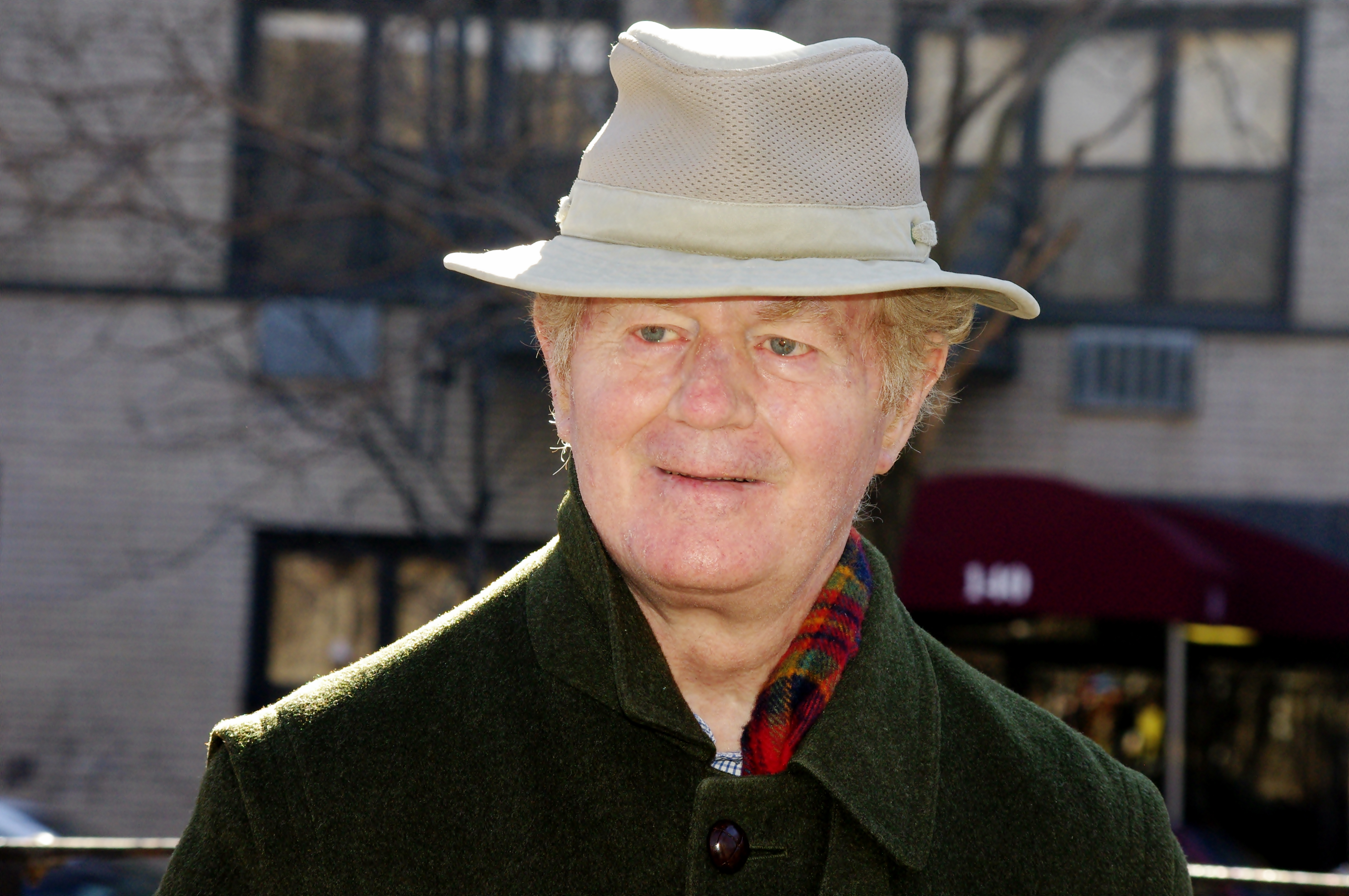
Schell giving a reading at the Occupy Wall Street event Occupy Town Square, in Tompkins Square Park in New York, February 2012

Jonathan Edward Schell (August 21, 1943 – March 25, 2014) was an American reporter and writer whose work primarily dealt with American foreign policy from the Vietnam War to the war on terror, as well as the threat posed by nuclear weapons and support for nuclear disarmament.

== Biography ==
=== Early life and education ===
Schell was born in New York City on August 21, 1943, to Orville Hickock Schell Jr., a lawyer who chaired Americas Watch, and Marjorie Bertha. His siblings included a sister, Suzanne, and a brother, Orville Schell, a former Dean of the University of California, Berkeley Graduate School of Journalism and, since 2006, the Arthur Ross Director of the Center on U.S.–China Relations at Asia Society in New York. He studied at Dalton School in New York and graduated from The Putney School in Vermont. In 1965 he graduated from Harvard University with a degree in Far Eastern history. He then spent a year learning Japanese at the International Christian University in Tokyo.

=== Early career: Vietnam, The New Yorker ===
After completing his studies in Tokyo, Schell flew to Saigon in January 1967, as American involvement in the Vietnam War continued to escalate. He managed to acquire a press pass by claiming to be a correspondent for The Harvard Crimson, and would later recount how the correspondents reporting on the war "took [him] under their wing". He was a witness to Operation Cedar Falls, writing particularly on the destruction of Bến Súc. His reportage was published first in The New Yorker and then as a book, The Village of Ben Suc, with Alfred A. Knopf.

His second book, The Military Half: An Account of Destruction in Quang Ngai and Quang Tin, published in 1968, also drew a graphic picture of the devastating effects of American bombings and ground operations on Quảng Ngãi Province and Quảng Tín Province in South Vietnam.

Never has a nation unleashed so much violence with so little risk to itself. It is the government's way of waging war without the support of its own people, and involves us all in the dishonor of killing in a cause we are no longer willing to die for.

— Jonathan Schell, The New Yorker, 1972

From 1967 until 1987, Schell was a staff writer at The New Yorker, where he served as the principal writer of the magazine's Notes and Comment section. He wrote essays for the magazine on the presidency of Richard Nixon, including the Watergate scandal that led to the president's resignation in 1974, that formed the basis to his book, The Time of Illusion. The Notes and Comments section was awarded the George Polk Award for Commentary in 1979.

In 1977, William Shawn, the longtime editor-in-chief of The New Yorker, designated Schell as his chosen successor to replace him but he was forced to rescind that plan as it proved immediately unpopular with the magazine's staff. Shawn revisited the same plan in 1982 but again withdrew Schell's name from consideration in the face of a staff revolt. Ultimately, upon a change of ownership of the magazine in 1987, Shawn was removed and replaced as editor-in-chief with Robert Gottlieb.

In the early 1980s, Schell wrote a series of articles in The New Yorker, subsequently published in 1982 as The Fate of the Earth, which were instrumental in raising public awareness about the dangers of the nuclear arms race and became an essential part of the Nuclear Freeze campaign. The book received the Los Angeles Times Book Prize, and was nominated for the Pulitzer Prize, the National Book Award, and the National Book Critics Circle Award. He became an advocate for disarmament and a world free of nuclear weapons.

=== Later career: The Nation, teaching ===
In 1987, Schell was a fellow at the Harvard Institute of Politics at the John F. Kennedy School of Government, and in 2002 he served as a fellow at the Kennedy School's Shorenstein Center on Media, Politics and Public Policy. He was a visiting lecturer at Yale Law School in 2003, and a fellow at the Yale Center for the Study of Globalization in 2005. He taught at several other universities, including Princeton, Emory, New York University, The New School, and Wesleyan University. At the time of his death he was a visiting lecturer at Yale College.

He was a columnist for Newsday from 1990 until 1996. From 1998 to his death in 2014, he was a senior fellow at The Nation Institute and the peace and disarmament correspondent for The Nation magazine. In addition, he wrote for TomDispatch, Harper's Magazine, Foreign Affairs, and The Atlantic.

In 2002 and 2003, Schell was a persistent critic of the invasion of Iraq. He later commented, "There doesn't seem to be a rush to find the people who were right about Iraq and install them in the mainstream media."

Jonathan Schell died at age 70, on March 25, 2014, at his home in Brooklyn, with a cancer caused by an underlying blood condition that may have been caused by Agent Orange. His last years were spent in research on climate change for an unwritten book he titled The Human Shadow.

=== Personal life ===
Schell was the long-term partner of the Kashubian historian Irena Grudzińska.

== Reception and legacy ==
In 1967, John Mecklin wrote in The New York Times Book Review that The Village of Ben Suc, Jonathan Schell's first book, was "written with a skill that many a veteran war reporter will envy, eloquently sensitive, subtly clothed in an aura of detachment, understated, extraordinarily persuasive."

Reviewing The Military Half: An Account of Destruction in Quang Ngai and Quang Tin, journalist and historian Jonathan Mirsky wrote in The Nation: "I know no book which has made me angrier and more ashamed."

On its publication in 1982, The Fate of the Earth was described by Kai Erikson in The New York Times Book Review as "a work of enormous force" and "an event of profound historical moment ... [I]n the end, it accomplishes what no other work has managed to do in the 37 years of the nuclear age. It compels us—and compel is the right word—to confront head on the nuclear peril in which we all find ourselves." The book also reflected on the end of love, politics and art, and the annihilation of humans as a species. CBS News journalist Walter Cronkite called the book "one of the most important works of recent years", praise that helped to solidify the book's commercial success.

In an 'Author's Note' to his collection of five short stories entitled Einstein's Monsters (1987), the Anglo-American writer Martin Amis said this about Schell's writings regarding nuclear weapons: "And throughout I am grateful to Jonathan Schell, for ideas and imagery. I don't know why he is our best writer on this subject. He is not the most stylish, perhaps, nor the most knowledgeable. But he is the most decorous and, I think, the most pertinent. He has moral accuracy; he is unerring."

Writing in Foreign Affairs magazine, however, David Greenberg called The Fate of the Earth an "overwrought doomsday polemic." Two decades later, in Slate, Michael Kinsley characterized it as "an overheated stew of the obvious and the idiotic" and suggested it was "the silliest book ever taken seriously by serious people." The Los Angeles Times noted that "some reviewers found Schell's book shrill and overstated."

Reviewing The Seventh Decade: The New Shape of Nuclear Danger in The New York Times Book Review in 2007, Martin Walker characterized it as "a passionate and cogently argued case for the complete abolition of nuclear weapons ... There is little in Schell's book that is new, but his careful assembly of the available evidence will scare the pants off most readers. And so it should."

In 2019, philosopher Akeel Bilgrami described Schell as "one of the great public intellectuals of our time," and described The Fate of the Earth as a "rightly celebrated classic".

== Bibliography ==
=== Books ===
- The Village of Ben Suc. Alfred A. Knopf. 1967.
- The Military Half: An Account of Destruction in Quang Ngai and Quang Tin. Alfred A. Knopf. 1968.
- The Time of Illusion. Alfred A. Knopf. 1976.
- The Fate of the Earth. Alfred A. Knopf. 1982.
- The Abolition. Alfred A. Knopf. 1984.
- History in Sherman Park: An American Family and the Reagan-Mondale Election. Alfred A. Knopf. 1987.
- The Real War: The Classic Reporting on the Vietnam War. Pantheon Books. 1988. (Collects The Village of Ben Suc and The Military Half with a new essay)
- Observing the Nixon Years: "Notes and Comment" from The New Yorker on the Vietnam War and the Watergate Crisis, 1969-1975. Pantheon Books. 1989.
- Writing in Time: A Political Chronicle. Moyer Bell. 1997.
- The Gift of Time: The Case for Abolishing Nuclear Weapons Now. Metropolitan Books. 1998.
- The Unfinished Twentieth Century. Verso. 2001.
- The Unconquerable World: Power, Nonviolence, and the Will of the People. Metropolitan Books. 2003.
- A Hole in the World: An Unfolding Story of War, Protest, and the New American Order. Nation Books. 2004.
- The Jonathan Schell Reader: On the United States at War, the Long Crisis of the American Republic, and the Fate of the Earth. Nation Books. 2006.
- The Seventh Decade: The New Shape of Nuclear Danger. Metropolitan Books. 2007.

=== Journalism ===
- "The Village of Ben Suc". A Reporter at Large. The New Yorker. Vol. 43, no. 21. July 15, 1967. pp. 28–93.
- Comment on the Pentagon Papers (June 26, 1971)
- Comment on the interdependence of the United States and the Soviet Union, displayed in latest Middle East peace talks (January 7, 1974)
- Comment on America's growing cynicism (January 21, 1974)
- Comment on the A.C.L.U.'s defense of a neo-Nazi march in Skokie, Illinois (August 21, 1978)
- Comment on the role of "obsession" in American foreign policy (May 14, 1984)
- Comment on Iran-Contra (January 26, 1987)
- "The Uncertain Leviathan". The Atlantic Monthly. Vol. 278, no. 2. August 1996. pp. 70–78.
