= Arthur W. Murphy =

American scientist (1922–2016)

Arthur W. Murphy (January 25, 1922 – January 16, 2016) was The Joseph Solomon Professor Emeritus in Wills, Trusts, and Estates Law at Columbia University and wrote on many aspects of nuclear power. From 1961-73 he was a member of the Atomic Safety and Licensing Board of the United States Atomic Energy Commission. In 1976 he wrote the book The Nuclear Power Controversy. Murphy died on January 16, 2016, at the age of 93.

== See also ==
- List of books about nuclear issues
