= M. Susan Lindee =

American historian and sociologist

- Born: Mary Susan Lindee; April 7, 1953 (age 73)
- Education: University of Texas at Austin; Cornell University
- Awards: Guggenheim Fellowship (2004)
- Scientific career
- Fields: History of science Sociology of science
- Workplaces: University of Pennsylvania
- Thesis: Mutation, radiation and species survival: The genetics studies of the Atomic Bomb Casualty Commission in Hiroshima and Nagasaki, Japan (1990)

Mary Susan Lindee (born April 7, 1953) is an American historian and sociologist of science who specializes in medicine and genetics. She has been the Janice and Julian Bers Professor of History and Sociology of Science at the University of Pennsylvania since 2013. At the University of Pennsylvania, she previously served as Chair of History and Sociology of Science, and as Associate Dean for the Social Sciences. She was awarded a Guggenheim Fellowship in 2004.

== Publications ==
Most widely held works by M. Susan Lindee:

- Suffering made real : American science and the survivors at Hiroshima, 1994
- Moments of truth in genetic medicine, 2005
