= Essence of Decision =

1971 book by Graham T. Allison

Essence of Decision: Explaining the Cuban Missile Crisis
- Author: Graham T. Allison
- Language: English
- Subject: Governmental decision-making during the Cuban Missile Crisis
- Publication date: 1971
- ISBN: 9780316034364

Essence of Decision: Explaining the Cuban Missile Crisis is a book by political scientist Graham T. Allison analyzing the 1962 Cuban Missile Crisis. Allison used the crisis as a case study for future studies into governmental decision-making. The book became the founding study of the John F. Kennedy School of Government, and in doing so revolutionized the field of international relations.

Allison originally published the book in 1971. In 1999, because of new materials available (including tape recordings of the U.S. government's proceedings), he rewrote the book with Philip Zelikow.

The title is based on a speech by John F. Kennedy, in which he said, "The essence of ultimate decision remains impenetrable to the observer - often, indeed, to the decider himself."

== Thesis ==
When he first wrote the book, Allison contended that political science and the study of international relations were saturated with rational expectations theories inherited from the field of economics. Under such a view, the actions of states are analyzed by assuming that nations consider all options and act rationally to maximize their utility.

Allison attributes such viewpoints to the dominance of economists such as Milton Friedman, statesmen such as Robert McNamara and Henry Kissinger, disciplines such as game theory, and organizations such as the RAND Corporation. However, as he puts it:

It must be noted, however, that an imaginative analyst can construct an account of value-maximizing choice for any action or set of actions performed by a government.

Or, to put it bluntly, this approach (which Allison terms the "Rational Actor Model") violates the principle of falsifiability. Also, Allison notes that "rational" analysts must ignore a lot of facts in order to make their analysis fit their models.

In response, Allison constructed three different ways (or "lenses") through which analysts can examine events: the "Rational Actor" model, the "Organizational Behavior" model, and the "Governmental Politics" model.

To illustrate the models, Allison poses the following three questions in each section:

1. Why did the Soviet Union decide to place offensive missiles in Cuba?
2. Why did the United States respond to the missile deployment with a blockade?
3. Why did the Soviet Union withdraw the missiles?

== Models ==
=== The "Rational Actor" Model ===
The origin of Allison's first model is explained above. Basically, under this theory:

- Governments are treated as the primary actor.
- The government examines a set of goals, evaluates them according to their utility, then picks the one that has the highest "payoff."

Under this theory, Allison explains the crisis like this:

1. John F. Kennedy, in 1961, revealed that the Soviet Union, despite rhetoric, had far fewer ICBMs than it claimed. In response, Nikita Khrushchev ordered nuclear missiles with shorter ranges installed in Cuba. In one move, the Soviets bridged the "missile gap" while scoring points in the Cold War. Based on Kennedy's failure to back up the Bay of Pigs Invasion, they believed the U.S. wouldn't respond harshly.
2. Kennedy and his advisors (EXCOMM) evaluated a number of options, ranging from doing nothing to a full invasion of Cuba. A blockade of Cuba was chosen because it wouldn't necessarily escalate into war, and because it forced the Soviets to make the next move.
3. Because of mutually assured destruction by a nuclear war, the Soviets had no choice but to bow to U.S. demands and remove the weapons.

Allison guessed that Kennedy must have made an "under the table" agreement concerning American nuclear missiles in Turkey. The American tapes released following 1993 confirmed this and the missiles were quietly removed from Turkey a few years after the crisis.

=== The "Organizational Process" Model ===
Allison noted there were many facts that the rational model had to ignore, such as why the Soviets failed to camouflage the nuclear sites during construction, but did so only after U-2 flights pinpointed their locations.

He cited work by James G. March and Herbert A. Simon, which argue that existing governmental bureaucracy places limits on a nation's actions, and often dictates the outcome. He then proposed the following "organizational process" model propositions:

- When faced with a crisis, government leaders don't look at it as a whole, but break it down and assign it according to pre-established organizational lines.
- Because of time and resource limitations, rather than evaluating all possible courses of action to see which one is most likely to work, leaders settle on the first proposal that adequately addresses the issue, which Simon termed "satisficing."
- Leaders gravitate towards solutions that limit short-term uncertainty (emphasis on "short-term").
- Organizations follow set "repertoires" and procedures when taking actions.
- Because of the large resources and time required to fully plan and mobilize actions within a large organization (or government), leaders are effectively limited to pre-existing plans.

Under this theory, the crisis is explained thus:

1. Because the Soviets never established nuclear missile bases outside of their country at the time, they assigned the tasks to established departments, which in turn followed their own set procedures. However, their procedures were not adapted to Cuban conditions, and as a result, mistakes were made that allowed the U.S. to quite easily learn of the program's existence. Such mistakes included such gaffes as supposedly undercover Soviet troops decorating their barracks with Red Army Stars viewable from above. Alternatively, the secrecy may have been the gaffe, stoking American fears unnecessarily.
2. Kennedy and his advisors never really considered any other options besides a blockade or air strikes, and initially, were almost unanimously in favor of the air strikes. However, such attacks created massive uncertainty because the U.S. Air Force couldn't guarantee it would disable all the nuclear missiles. Additionally, although Kennedy wanted a "surgical" air strike that would destroy the missiles without inflicting extensive damage, the existing Air Force plan required extensive bombing that would have created more collateral damage than Kennedy desired. Because the U.S. Navy already had considerable strength in the field, because there was a pre-existing plan in place for a blockade, and because Kennedy was able to communicate directly with the fleet's captains, members fell back on the blockade as the only safe option.
3. The Soviets simply did not have a plan to follow if the U.S. took decisive action against their missiles. Khrushchev's communications indicated a high degree of desperation. Without any back-up plan, the Soviets had to withdraw.

=== The "Bureaucratic Politics" Model ===
After reading works by Richard Neustadt and Samuel P. Huntington, among others, Allison proposed a third model, which takes account of court politics (or palace politics). While statesmen don't like to admit they play politics to get things done, especially in high-stakes situations such as the Cuban missile crisis, they nonetheless do.

Allison proposed the following propositions for this model:

- A nation's actions are best understood as the result of politicking and negotiation by its top leaders.
- Even if they share a goal, leaders differ in how to achieve it because of such factors as personal interests and background.
- Even if a leader holds absolute power (e.g., the President of the United States is technically the commander-in-chief), the leader must gain a consensus with his underlings or risk having his order misunderstood or, in some cases, ignored.
- Related to the above proposition, the make-up of a leader's entourage will have a large effect on the final decision (i.e., an entourage of "yes men" will create a different outcome than a group of advisors who are willing to voice disagreement).
- Leaders have different levels of power based on charisma, personality, skills of persuasion, and personal ties to decision-makers.
- If a leader is certain enough, they will not seek input from their advisors, but rather, approval. Likewise, if a leader has already implicitly decided on a particular course of action, an advisor wishing to have influence must work within the framework of the decision the leader has already made.
- If a leader fails to reach a consensus with his inner circle (or, at least, the appearance of a consensus), opponents may take advantage of these disagreements. Therefore, effective leaders must create a consensus.
- Because of the possibilities of miscommunication, misunderstandings, and downright disagreements, different leaders may take actions that the group as a whole would not approve of.

Allison had to admit that, because the Soviets were not as open with their internal affairs as the Americans, he simply didn't have enough data to fully interpret the crisis with this model. Nonetheless, he made the following attempt:

1. Khrushchev came under increasing fire from the Presidium because of Kennedy's revelation of the Soviet lack of ICBMs, as well as American successes in the Berlin Airlift. Also, the Soviet economy was being stretched, and military leaders were unhappy with Khrushchev's decision to cut the size of the Red Army. Placing missiles in Cuba was a cheap and quick way for him to secure his political base.
2. Because of the failure of the Bay of Pigs invasion, Republicans in the Congress made Cuban policy into a major issue for the upcoming congressional elections later in 1962. Therefore, Kennedy immediately decided on a strong response rather than a diplomatic one. Although a majority of EXCOMM initially favored air strikes, those closest to the president - such as his brother and Attorney General, Robert F. Kennedy, and special counsel Theodore Sorensen - favored the blockade. At the same time, Kennedy got into arguments with proponents of the air strikes, such as Air Force General Curtis LeMay. After the Bay of Pigs Invasion fiasco, Kennedy also distrusted the CIA and its advice. In order to avoid appearing weak to the hawkish members of EXCOMM, Kennedy rejected the purely diplomatic proposals of United States Ambassador to the United Nations Adlai Stevenson. This combination of push and pull led to a consensus for the implication of a blockade.
3. With his plans thwarted, Khrushchev tried to save face by pointing to American missiles in Turkey, a position similar to the Cuban missiles. While Kennedy refused to move these missiles "under duress," he allowed Robert Kennedy to reach a deal with Soviet ambassador Anatoly Dobrynin, in which the Turkish missiles would be quietly removed several months later. Publicly, Kennedy also agreed never to invade Cuba.

== Implications ==
When the book was first published, Allison's primary message was that the concept of mutually assured destruction as a barrier to nuclear war was unfounded. By looking at organizational and political models, such an outcome was quite possible - nations, against what was predicted by the rational viewpoint, could indeed "commit suicide."

He pointed to several incidents in history that seemed to back this assertion. His most salient point: prior to the attack at Pearl Harbor, Japanese military and civilian leaders, including those responsible for making the decision, were fully aware that they lacked the industrial capacity and military might to win a war against the U.S. They went ahead and attacked anyway.

He also believed that the organizational model explained otherwise inexplicable gaffes in military history. To return to 1941, he noted that the U.S. intercepted enough evidence to indicate that Japan was about to attack Pearl Harbor, yet the commander did not prepare. The answer, Allison revealed, was not some conspiracy, but that what the intelligence community viewed as a "threat of attack," the commander interpreted as a "threat of sabotage." This miscommunication, due to different viewpoints, allowed the attack to be pulled off successfully - as Allison sarcastically noted, having U.S. planes lined up wing-to-wing and surrounded by armed guards was a good plan for preventing sabotage, but not for surviving an aerial attack.

Likewise, the political process model explained otherwise confusing affairs. Allison pointed to the decision by General Douglas MacArthur to defy his orders during the Korean War and march too far north. The reason was not a "rational" change in U.S. intentions, but rather, MacArthur's disagreements with Harry Truman and other policymakers, and how officials allowed MacArthur to make what they considered unwise moves because of concerns over political backlash due to the general's public popularity.

Above all, he described using rational actor models as dangerous. By using such models (and modes of thinking), people made unreliable assumptions about reality, which could have disastrous consequences. Part of what allowed the attack on Pearl Harbor to be pulled off was the assumption that, since Japan would lose such a war, they would never dare attack. The assumption under MAD is that nobody will ever start a nuclear war because of its consequences. However, humans are not inextricably bound to act in a rational manner, which history has proven time and time again.

While Allison did not claim that any of his additional two models could fully explain anything, he noted that policymakers and analysts alike would benefit from stepping away from the traditional model and exploring alternate viewpoints (although this last remark could be viewed as facetious on Allison's part).

== Criticism ==
The book is part of an ongoing argument between supporters of rational expectations theories and analysts who look for alternative explanations. Moreover, Allison pointed out that the "rational actor" model continues to be applied even in long-term analyses (i.e., analyses that take place long after the event or "crisis" is past). In Essence of Decision, Allison suggests that one reason for the popularity of rational actor models is that, compared to other models, they require relatively little data and provide researchers with an "inexpensive approximation" of the situation. Allison also quotes Thomas Schelling's description of rationalistic thinking and vicarious problem solving:

You can sit in your armchair and try to predict how people will behave by asking how you would behave if you had your wits around you. You get, free of charge, a lot of vicarious, empirical behavior.

Finally, in Allison's first edition (1971), he was unable to fully explore his theories because much of the information was still classified. As a result, he made a number of assumptions on his own part. Following the collapse of the Soviet Union and the release of American recordings of EXCOMM, this new information (included in the revised 1999 edition) sometimes agreed with Allison's assumptions, but sometimes didn't.

For example, in 1971, Allison guessed that Kennedy must have made an "under the table" agreement concerning the Turkish missiles, probably using his brother as a liaison. The American tapes confirmed this.

However, Allison also guessed in 1971 that Khrushchev must have formed his own "EXCOMM," or his own committee of advisors, to aid him during the crisis, and even named the Russian leaders he believed were with Khrushchev at the time. However, the Soviet records revealed that these individuals were not present, and Khrushchev was effectively stuck alone in his office during the crisis without the type of support Kennedy had.
