= Michael A. Levi =

Michael A. Levi is a policy expert who served as Special Assistant to the President for Energy and Economic Policy in the Obama White House from 2016 to 2017. He was previously the David M. Rubenstein senior fellow for energy and environment at the Council on Foreign Relations (CFR), a nonpartisan foreign-policy think tank and membership organization, and director of its Maurice R. Greenberg Center for Geoeconomic Studies. He is an expert on energy and climate, highly regulated technology, and defense and security policy.

== Education ==
Levi holds a BSc (Hons.) in mathematical physics from Queen's University, and an MA degree in physics from Princeton University, where he studied string theory and cosmology. He also holds a PhD in war studies from King's College London where he was the SSHRC William E. Taylor fellow.

== Career ==
Levi was previously a fellow for science and technology at the Council and, before that, a nonresident science fellow and a science-and-technology fellow in foreign policy studies at the Brookings Institution. He was previously director of the flagship Strategic Security Project of the Federation of American Scientists.

== Books ==
Dr. Levi is author of The Power Surge: Energy, Opportunity, and the Battle for America’s Future (Oxford University Press, May 2013 ISBN 978-0199986163). In The Power Surge, Levi details two unfolding energy revolutions in the United States, and the implications that they might have for America's economy, national security, and environment. Levi uses historical analysis, scientific data, and on-the-ground reporting to establish that America's energy future need not be a zero-sum game. He argues that the best path forward lies in a strategy that increases "opportunities for energy production of all kinds, while penalizing dangerous energy consumption that would worsen climate change and sustain U.S. dependence on oil."

Levi is also the author of the book On Nuclear Terrorism (Harvard University Press, 2007) and coauthor with Michael E. O'Hanlon of The Future of Arms Control (Brookings Institution Press, 2005). His 2005 monograph with Michael D’Arcy, Untapped Potential: U.S. Science and Technology Cooperation with the Islamic World was the first comprehensive study of science and technology in the Muslim world. His recent writings include studies of natural gas exports, the Canadian oil sands, and the global politics and economics of clean energy innovation.

== Other ==
Levi has been invited to testify before Congress where he presented expert scientific evidence to the National Academy of Sciences. Levi was project director for the CFR-sponsored Independent Task Force on climate change, co-chaired by former governors Tom Vilsack and George Pataki. He participated in the 2010 Hertog Global Strategy Initiative, a high-level research program on nuclear proliferation. His essays have been published in Foreign Affairs, Foreign Policy, Nature, Scientific American, among others. His op-eds have appeared in The New York Times, The Washington Post, The Wall Street Journal, and Financial Times. Dr. Levi previously wrote a monthly online column on science and security for the New Republic, and served as a technical consultant to the critically acclaimed television drama 24. He currently writes a blog on energy, climate, and nuclear issues.

== Publications ==
- The Power Surge: Energy, Opportunity, and the Battle for America's Future (Oxford University Press, May 2013, ISBN 978-019-998616-3)
- America's Energy Opportunity; How to Harness the New Sources of U.S. Power May/June 2013 Foreign Affairs
- A Strategy for U.S. Natural Gas Exports 2012
- How to Salvage the Climate Conference Copenhagen's Inconvenient Truth September/October 2009 Foreign Affairs referring to the United Nations Climate Change Conference 2009
- Stopping Nuclear Terrorism: The Dangerous Allure of a Perfect Defense
- On Nuclear Terrorism, ISBN 978-0-674-02649-0
