= Laura Garwin =

American trumpeter and former science journalist

Laura Justine Garwin (born 1957) is an American trumpeter and former science journalist. One of the first women to become a Rhodes Scholar, she is the former physical sciences editor of Nature, co-editor of the book A Century of Nature, and a Fellow of the American Physical Society. After leaving her career in science to become a professional musician in London, she played with the BBC Symphony Orchestra and became principal trumpet of the Covent Garden Sinfonia and the St Paul's Sinfonia.

== Early life and education ==
Garwin, born in 1957, is the daughter of physicist and hydrogen bomb designer Richard Garwin. She skipped two grades in elementary school, and finished Scarsdale High School at age 15. She then went to Radcliffe College (now part of Harvard University), following her father's footsteps as a physics major but also playing trumpet in multiple student music groups, singing a cappella close harmony with the Radcliffe Pitches, and playing for the school's volleyball and water polo teams.

After graduating in 1977, she became a Rhodes Scholar at the University of Oxford, in the first year that the Rhodes Scholarship program included women among its scholars. At Oxford, she read geology in St Hugh's College. After a second bachelor's degree from Oxford, she went to the University of Cambridge for a doctorate in earth sciences; her dissertation research applied fission track dating to the geology of the eastern Pyrenees.

== Science journalism ==
Garwin became physical sciences editor of Nature in 1988. In 1996 she became North American editor for Nature. In 2001 she returned to Harvard, as director of research for the Bauer Center for Genomics Research, headed by Andrew Murray, and subsequently as executive director of the Harvard Center for Systems Biology.

Her book A Century of Nature: Twenty-One Discoveries that Changed Science and the World (edited with Tim Lincoln) was published by the University of Chicago Press in 2003. She is also the coauthor with Philip Ball of a heavily-cited 1992 Nature report on nanotechnology, Science at the atomic scale.

Garwin's work in science journalism was recognized by the American Physical Society (APS) in 2003, by electing her as a Fellow of the American Physical Society. Her nomination as a fellow was supported by the APS Division of Biological Physics, and was for "her outstanding contributions in increasing the strength and prestige of physics and biological physics at Nature, and for her service to the physics and biology communities, as a bridge between these disciplines".

== Return to music ==
In 2006, Garwin returned to school at the age of 48 and focused primarily on trumpet. She became a student again, at the Royal College of Music. While in the college, she played with the BBC Symphony Orchestra. After earning a Postgraduate Diploma in advanced performance in 2009, she became principal trumpet for the Orchestra of St Paul's (later renamed the Covent Garden Sinfonia) and the St Paul's Sinfonia. She is also a member of a London-based brass quintet, Pentagon Brass. Before the COVID-19 pandemic, she played for many concerts and ballets.
