= Robert Del Tredici =

Canadian photographer, artist and activist

Robert Del Tredici is a Canadian photographer, artist, and activist, who documented the impact of the 1979 Three Mile Island accident on the community. His first book of photographs and interviews, The People of Three Mile Island (Sierra Club Books, 1980), was a social critique of nuclear power. His second book, At Work in the Fields of the Bomb (Harper & Row, 1987), discussed the US nuclear weapons industry and won the 1987 Olive Branch Book Award for its contribution to world peace.

He founded the Atomic Photographers Guild in 1987 along with photographers Carole Gallagher and Harris Fogel. He also wrote to the Nikkei Voice in Toronto with activist Cindy Kenny-Gilday in 1997 and 1998.

Del Tredici has a Bachelor of Arts in Philosophy, and a Master of Arts in Comparative Literature. For many years he taught Photography and the History of Animated Film at Concordia University in Montreal, and he previously taught at Vanier College.

== See also ==
- Anti-nuclear movement in Canada
- Kenji Higuchi
- Three Mile Island: A Nuclear Crisis in Historical Perspective
- Three Mile Island: Thirty Minutes to Meltdown
- Three Mile Island accident health effects
- James Acord
