= The Atom Besieged =

1981 book by Dorothy Nelkin and Michael Pollak

The Atom Besieged: Extraparliamentary Dissent in France and Germany
- Author: Dorothy Nelkin and Michael Pollak
- Publication date: 1981

The Atom Besieged: Extraparliamentary Dissent in France and Germany is a 1981 book by Dorothy Nelkin and Michael Pollak.
