= Aroon Raman =

Indian entrepreneur and author

- Writing career
- Language: English
- Genres: Thriller, adventure
- Notable works: The Treasure of Kafur, The Shadow Throne, SkyFire
- Website: www.aroonraman.com

Aroon Raman is an Indian entrepreneur and author.

== Education and early life ==
Raman was born in India to parents of South Indian descent. He attained his Masters in Economics from Jawaharlal Nehru University, Delhi, and then pursued his MBA from Wharton School, University of Pennsylvania.

== Business life ==
In 1991, he set up "Raman Boards", a company involved in electrical materials, which was later bought by the ABB Group in 2007. He then started his Research and Development company named "Raman FibreScience" in 2008. The company specializes in wet-laid composites. His company is also well known for developing talent at the grassroots level.

In 2010, he was elected Chairman of the CII Karnataka State Council for a period of one year.

== Writing career ==
In 2012, Pan Macmillan India published Raman's first book, The Shadow Throne, which became a national bestseller, according to The Hindu. The story revolved about a secret society that threatened to launch nuclear weapons on Indian cities and the subsequent attempts to stop them. It was considered among the best Indian fiction releases of the year by The Telegraph and a racy political thriller by The Hindu.

Raman wrote his second mystery-thriller, The Treasure of Kafur, over a period of seven years. The book, published in December 2013 by Pan Macmillan India, was set up in Mughal India and is a fantasy book with fictionalized depictions of historical characters. The Indian Express called the book entertaining and action-packed.

His third book, SkyFire is a sequel to The Shadow Throne and was published in 2016.

== Bibliography ==
- Chandrasekhar Series
  - The Shadow Throne (2012, Pan Macmillan India)
  - SkyFire (2016, Pan Macmillan India)
- The Treasure of Kafur (2013, Pan Macmillan India)
