= Nuclear War in the UK =

2019 non-fiction book by Taras Young

- Author: Taras Young
- Subject: Nuclear war
- Genre: Nonfiction
- Publisher: Four Corners Books
- Publication date: October 2019
- Pages: 132
- ISBN: 978-1-909829-16-9

Nuclear War in the UK is a 2019 non-fiction book by British historian and researcher Taras Young. It is a history of official British public information documents and guidance prepared in case of nuclear attack, drawn from the author's collection. The book charts the development of public information campaigns, such as posters, pamphlets and propaganda, from the dropping of nuclear weapons on Hiroshima and Nagasaki in 1946 up to the end of the Cold War in the early 1990s.

It includes detailed accounts of the creation of official guidance by the Home Office, including the Protect and Survive campaign in the 1970s and 1980s. It also includes materials produced by local authorities, as well as privately created publications such as Protect and Survive Monthly magazine and advertisements for nuclear bunkers.

The book was published as part of Four Corners Books' Irregulars series of books about modern British visual culture.

== Critical reception ==
Response to Nuclear War in the UK was positive, with popular media citing the book's accessible take on the subject matter, and specialist publications praising its new take on the subject and previously unseen material. In its review of the book, the Morning Star called it "entertaining, informative and chilling", adding that it "offers a startling insight into the government's attitude to its citizens". Broadcaster Iain Lee praised the book on his Talksport radio show, calling it "fascinating, terrifying, and strangely comforting to see all this stuff gathered in one place".

In his review of the book, Fortean Times editor David Sutton called it a "a handsome book with excellent reproductions of rarely seen material ... Young’s succinct account provides the necessary context". Specialist underground exploration magazine Subterranea said the book was a "welcome addition covering a new angle on the UK's preparation for the Cold War," adding: "Many of us lived through the period under analysis, but few would have been aware of the wide range of publications produced to protect the population."
