= Red Jihad =

2012 novel by Sami Ahmad Khan

Red Jihad: Battle for South Asia
- First Indian edition cover
- Author: Sami Ahmad Khan
- Series: Red Jihad #1
- Genre: Conspiracy fiction, Thriller
- Publisher: Rupa & Co. India Pvt Ltd
- Publication date: June 2012
- Publication place: India
- Pages: 280
- ISBN: 9788129119872
- Followed by: Aliens in Delhi

Red Jihad: Battle for South Asia is a political/military thriller by Sami Ahmad Khan. It was published by Rupa & Co. in June 2012. Red Jihad was hailed as one of the first novels to fictionalize the Maoist-Mujahideen nexus in the Indian Red Corridor and for dramatizing the links between religious fundamentalism and political terrorism in India.

Red Jihad was Khan's debut. After its publication, Businessworld magazine said Khan might have started a genre that will lead many youngsters to learn the English language the way an earlier generation learnt it through Robert Ludlums and Fredrick Forsyths. Khan has also been labelled as the Indian equivalent of Tom Clancy by the Millennium Post.

== Plot ==
In 2014, Pakistan becomes a democracy and seeks peace with India, but faces opposition. Yasser Basheer, a Pakistani Jihadist leader, travels to the Red Corridor and teams up with Agyaat, an Indian Naxalite commander. They plot to unleash India's experimental missile, Pralay, to attack Pakistan, leading to war between the two nations with other countries threatening to join the conflict.

== Awards and reception ==
Red Jihad: Battle for South Asia garnered generally positive reception and the novel went into a reprint within months of its release. It was praised by Think Tank Policy Research Group for its "impartiality and sensitivity towards complex geo-political relations and ideologies" and "being able to crystal gaze into the future of Indo-Pak relations" and for extrapolating from contemporary scenarios.

Literary Awards: Red Jihad won the "Muse India Young Writer (Runner-Up) Award" at the Hyderabad Literary Festival 2013 and "Excellence in Youth Fiction Writing" at Delhi World Book Fair 2013.

== Sequel ==
Khan is now working on his second book, a science-fiction sequel to Red Jihad, that is themed around time-travel and alternate history. The working title of the sequel is Aliens in Delhi.
