= Richard Garwin =

American physicist (1928–2025)

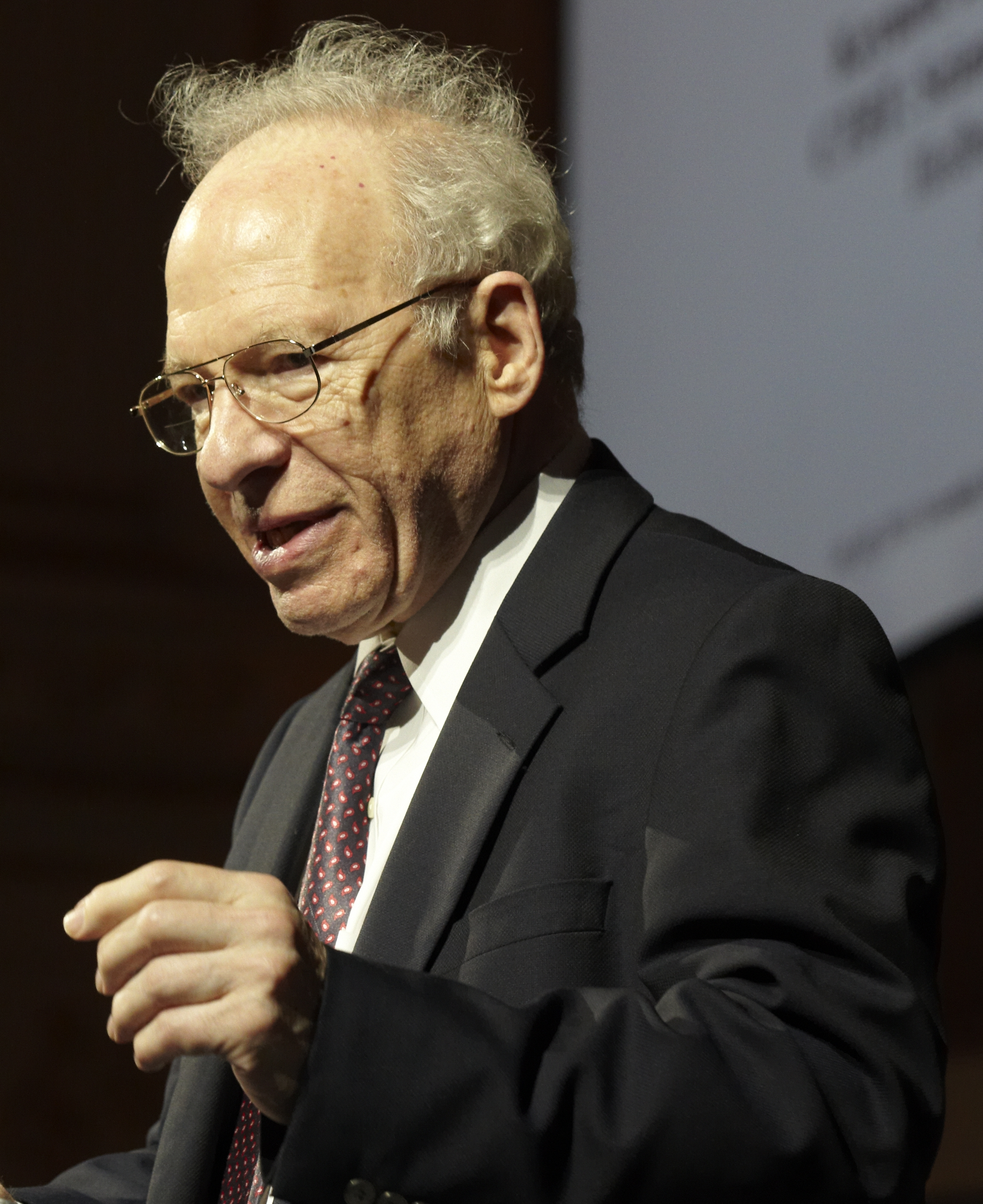
- Garwin in 2011
- Born: Richard Lawrence Garwin; April 19, 1928; Cleveland, Ohio, U.S.
- Died: May 13, 2025 (aged 97); Scarsdale, New York, U.S.
- Education: Case Institute of Technology (BS); University of Chicago (PhD)
- Spouse: Lois Levy (m. 1947; died 2018)
- Children: 3, including Laura
- Awards: Presidential Medal of Freedom; National Medal of Science; Grande Médaille de l'Académie des Sciences; Vannevar Bush Award
- Scientific career
- Fields: Physics
- Workplaces: University of Chicago; Columbia University; Cornell University; Harvard University
- Thesis: An experimental investigation of the beta-gamma angular correlation in beta decay (1949)
- Doctoral advisor: Enrico Fermi
- Doctoral students: Myriam Sarachik

Richard Lawrence Garwin (April 19, 1928 – May 13, 2025) was an American physicist and government advisor, best known as the author of the first hydrogen bomb design.

In 1978, Garwin was elected a member of the National Academy of Engineering for contributing to the application of the latest scientific discoveries to innovative practical engineering applications contributing to national security and economic growth. In 2015 he received the Presidential Medal of Freedom for his contributions to science, technology and security.

== Background ==
Garwin was born to a Jewish family in Cleveland on April 19, 1928. He received his bachelor's degree from the Case Institute of Technology in 1947, and two years later his Doctor of Philosophy, at the age of 21, from the University of Chicago under the supervision of Enrico Fermi. Another of Fermi's students, Marvin L. Goldberger, claims that Fermi said that "Garwin was the only true genius he had ever met".

== Career ==
After graduating from the University of Chicago, Garwin joined the physics faculty there and spent summers as a consultant to Los Alamos National Laboratory working on nuclear weapons. Garwin was the author of the actual design used in the first hydrogen bomb (code-named Mike) in 1952. He was assigned the job by Edward Teller, with the instructions that he was to make it as conservative a design as possible in order to prove the concept was feasible. He also worked on the development of the first spy satellites, for which he was named one of the ten founders of national reconnaissance. While at IBM, his work on spin-echo magnetic resonance laid the foundations for MRI; he was the catalyst for the discovery and publication of the Cooley–Tukey FFT algorithm, today a staple of digital signal processing; he worked on gravitational waves; and played a crucial role in the development of laser printers and touch-screen monitors. He was granted 47 patents and published over 500 papers.

In December 1952, he joined IBM's Watson laboratory, where he worked continuously until his retirement in 1993. He was until his death IBM Fellow Emeritus at the Thomas J. Watson Research Center in Yorktown Heights, New York. During his career Garwin divided his time between applied research, basic science, and consulting to the U.S. Government on national-security matters. Parallel to his appointment at IBM, at different periods he held an adjunct professorship in physics at Columbia University; an appointment as the Andrew D. White Professor-at-Large at Cornell University; and a professorship in public policy, and in physics, at Harvard University. He was also the Philip D. Reed Senior Fellow at the Council on Foreign Relations in New York, NY.

Garwin served on the U.S. President's Science Advisory Committee from 1962–65 and 1969–72, under Presidents Kennedy, Johnson, and Nixon. He was a member of the JASON Defense Advisory Group from 1966. As a member of the Institute for Defense Analyses' Jason Division of U.S. university scientists. on Sat. February 3, 1968, Garwin “traveled to Vietnam” with Henry Way Kendall and several other scientists “to check on the operation of the electronic barrier” he and other Jason scientists developed for the Pentagon to utilize in Indochina, according to The Jasons by Ann Finkbeiner. And, in the 1960s, "Jason scientist Richard Garwin, a nuclear physicist who, years before, helped design the Castle Bravo hydrogen bomb, held a seminar on the SADEYE cluster bomb and other munitions that would be most effective when accompanying the sensors" of the electronic barrier in Vietnam, according to page 205 of Annie Jacobsen's book, "The Pentagon's Brain: An Uncensored History of DARPA, America's Top Secret Military Research Agency," that Little Brown & Company, NY published in 2015. During the 1980s and 1990s he advocated anti-ballistic missile concepts such as the bed of nails defense, a plan that was never implemented.

From 1993 to August 2001, he chaired the Arms Control and Nonproliferation Advisory Board of the U.S. Department of State. From 1966 to 1969 he served on the Defense Science Board. He also served on the Commission to Assess the Ballistic Missile Threat to the United States in 1998. He was until his death a member of the National Academies' Committee on International Security and Arms Control and served on 27 other National Academies committees.

Garwin was a long-time critic of the idea that nuclear missile defense is possible and that a nuclear war was winnable. "During and since the cold war, Garwin apparently mastered the details of every proposed scheme: detecting, tracking and intercepting missiles, and protecting US missiles and cities. He criticized them all, from the 1960s anti-ballistic missile debates, through the 1980s Strategic Defense Initiative, to the most recent proposals. He said repeatedly that missile defence was political, expensive and mostly ineffective." Nature obituary

In 2017, science journalist Joel N. Shurkin published a biography of Garwin, True Genius: The Life and Work of Richard Garwin, in which Shurkin writes about "the most influential scientist you never heard of."

== Personal life and death ==
In 1947, Garwin married Lois Levy (died 2018), and they had three children, one of whom is musician and journalist Laura Garwin. He died at his home in Scarsdale, New York, on May 13, 2025, at the age of 97.

== Honors ==
Garwin received the National Medal of Science, the United States' highest honor for the fields of science and engineering (award year 2002), for "his research and discoveries in physics and related fields, and of his longstanding service to the Nation by providing valuable scientific advice on important questions of national security over a half a century." He also received the equivalent, La Grande Médaille de l'Académie des Sciences, from France for his role in discovering parity violation in pion decay. He is among a select few scientists to have been elected to all three U.S. National Academies: the National Academy of Sciences (elected 1966), the National Academy of Medicine (1975), and the National Academy of Engineering (1978). He was also a member of both the American Academy of Arts and Sciences (1969) and the American Philosophical Society (1979). In 2016, President Barack Obama honored Garwin with a Presidential Medal of Freedom. Garwin also received 1988 AAAS Award for Scientific Freedom and Responsibility and the Golden Plate Award of the American Academy of Achievement in 1997.

== See also ==
- Accelerator-driven subcritical reactor
- Energy amplifier
- Megawatts and Megatons
