= The Seventh Decade =

2007 book by Jonathan Schell

The Seventh Decade: The New Shape of Nuclear Danger
- Author: Jonathan Schell
- Publisher: Metropolitan Books, an imprint of Henry Holt & Company
- Publication date: November 2007
- Pages: 272pp
- ISBN: 978-0-8050-8129-9
- OCLC: 122701842
- Dewey Decimal: 355.02/170973 22
- LC Class: U264.3 .S43 2007

The Seventh Decade: The New Shape of Nuclear Danger is a book published by Jonathan Schell in 2007. It explores George W. Bush's nuclear policies and their potential effects.
