= On Nuclear Terrorism =

2007 book by Michael A. Levi

- Author: Michael A. Levi
- Subject: Nuclear terrorism
- Publication date: 2007
- Pages: 210
- ISBN: 978-0-674-02649-0

In his 2007 book On Nuclear Terrorism, author Michael A. Levi surveys the issue of nuclear terrorism and explores the decisions a terrorist leader might take in pursuing a nuclear plot. Levi points out the many obstacles that such a terrorist scheme may encounter, which in turn leads to a host of possible ways that any terrorist plan could be foiled.

Professor John Mueller's 2010 book Atomic Obsession: Nuclear Alarmism From Hiroshima to Al-Qaeda is an expansion of the same theme.

Michael Levi is a senior fellow for energy and environment at the Council on Foreign Relations, New York.

== See also ==
- List of books about nuclear issues
