= History of the United States (2016–present) =

The United States of America — Contemporary era
- 2016–present
History of the United States (1991–2016)
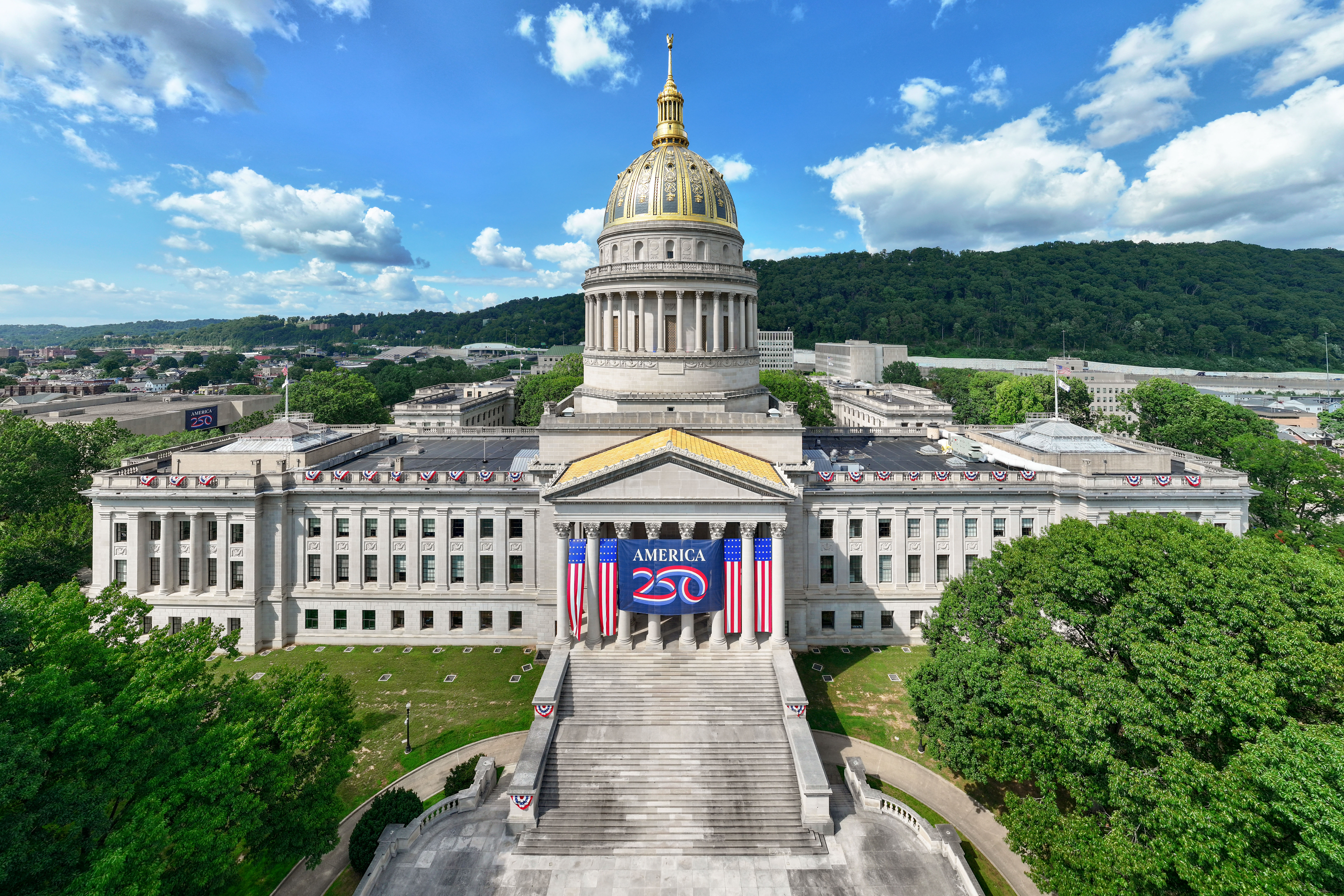
- View of the West Virginia State Capitol, decorated for the United States Semiquincentennial (250th anniversary), in Charleston, West Virginia
- Location: United States
- Including: Second Cold War; War on terror (until 2021); War on drugs and the opioid epidemic Fourth Industrial Revolution; Rise in mass shootings Migrations: New Great Migration; Central American migrant caravans
- President(s): Barack Obama; Donald Trump; Joe Biden
- Key events: 2016–2021: Russian interference in the 2016 United States elections; Women's March; 2017 Atlantic hurricane season; Unite the Right rally; #MeToo movement; 2018 California wildfires; China–United States trade war; Hurricane Florence; Death of Jeffrey Epstein; First impeachment of Donald Trump; COVID-19 pandemic; 2020 California wildfires; U.S.–Mexico–Canada Agreement; 2020 Atlantic hurricane season; George Floyd protests; Attempts to overturn the 2020 United States presidential election; January 6 Capitol attack; Second impeachment of Donald Trump; Stop Asian Hate movement; 2021–2024: Withdrawal from Afghanistan; Dobbs v. Jackson Women's Health Organization; United States abortion-rights movement; Support for Ukraine; Mexico-United States border crisis; Indictments of Donald Trump; 2023 labor strikes; 2023 U.S. banking crisis; Gaza war protests; Francis Scott Key Bridge collapse; Attempted assassination of Donald Trump; Hurricanes Helene and Milton; Killing of Brian Thompson; 2025–present: January 2025 Southern California wildfires; January 2025 Gaza war ceasefire; Trump proposals for U.S. expansion; 2025 trade war with Canada and Mexico; No Kings protests (June • October); U.S. Army 250th Anniversary military parade; Twelve-Day War ceasefire; July 2025 Central Texas floods; Assassination of Charlie Kirk; 2025 United States federal government shutdown; 2025 US Caribbean naval deployment; Minnesota ICE raids; Epstein Files Transparency Act; 2026 US intervention in Venezuela; 2026 Cuban crisis; 2026 United States federal government shutdowns; Greenland Crisis; 2026 Iran War; March 2026 No Kings protests; Artemis II; 2026 White House Correspondents' dinner shooting; United States Semiquincentennial

The history of the United States that began in 2016 is notable for a return to great power rivalry between the United States, China, and Russia. This period has been called the Second Cold War as well as part of a Second Gilded Age driven by increasing wealth inequality. It has also been described as the beginning of the Seventh Party System, due to recent shifts in demographics and voting patterns.

In 2016, China surpassed the United States as the world's largest economy when measured by purchasing power parity (PPP). In the 2016 U.S. presidential election, the Republican Party ticket of Donald Trump and Mike Pence, using a populist message, defeated Democratic Party ticket of Hillary Clinton and Tim Kaine. Barack Obama finished his presidency by completing a withdrawal of thousands of U.S. troops from Afghanistan and declassifying alleged significant Russian interference in the 2016 United States elections.

During his first presidency, which began in 2017, Trump enacted tax cuts, increased immigration restrictions, expanded the Mexico–United States border wall, and signed the National Defense Authorization Act for Fiscal Year 2020 establishing the United States Space Force. Trump promoted an "America First" foreign policy that included a trade war with China. In December 2019, Trump was impeached for his alleged role in a scandal involving the Russo-Ukrainian War, for which he was subsequently acquitted. In 2020, Trump oversaw the federal government response to the COVID-19 pandemic and subsequent recession as he ran for reelection against Obama's vice president Joe Biden. The Democratic ticket of Biden and Kamala Harris beat Trump and Pence in the 2020 presidential election. Trump, along with his supporters, made multiple attempts to overturn the presidential election with false claims of fraud, which culminated with the January 6, 2021, attack on the U.S. Capitol in an attempt to stop the peaceful transfer of power. The attack and Trump's involvement led to his second impeachment and acquittal.

The presidency of Joe Biden, which began in 2021, included major legislation such as the American Rescue Plan Act, Infrastructure Investment and Jobs Act, CHIPS and Science Act, and the Inflation Reduction Act. Biden's foreign policy oversaw the complete withdrawal of U.S. troops that ended the war in Afghanistan, leading to the Taliban retaking control from the collapsed Afghan government. Biden kept tariffs from Trump's trade war with China. Biden responded to the Russian invasion of Ukraine that began in 2022 by imposing sanctions on Russia and authorizing civilian and military aid to Ukraine. Biden strongly supported Israel's military efforts during the Gaza war that began in 2023 before adopting a ceasefire proposal at the end of his term. Biden abandoned his 2024 reelection campaign and endorsed Harris, who lost to the Republican ticket of Trump and JD Vance in the 2024 United States presidential election.

Trump began his second presidency by pardoning around 1,500 January 6 rioters, initiating mass layoffs of the federal workforce, signing the Laken Riley Act, and starting a trade war with Mexico and Canada while escalating the trade war with China. Trump's administration suspended the provision of intelligence and military aid to Ukraine, offered concessions to Russia, requested half of Ukraine's oil and minerals as payment for U.S. support, and said that Ukraine bore partial responsibility for the invasion. These moves have been criticized by most of the United States' allies and by many international organizations. Trump's broad and extensive use of executive orders has drawn numerous lawsuits challenging their legality.

== Domestic politics ==
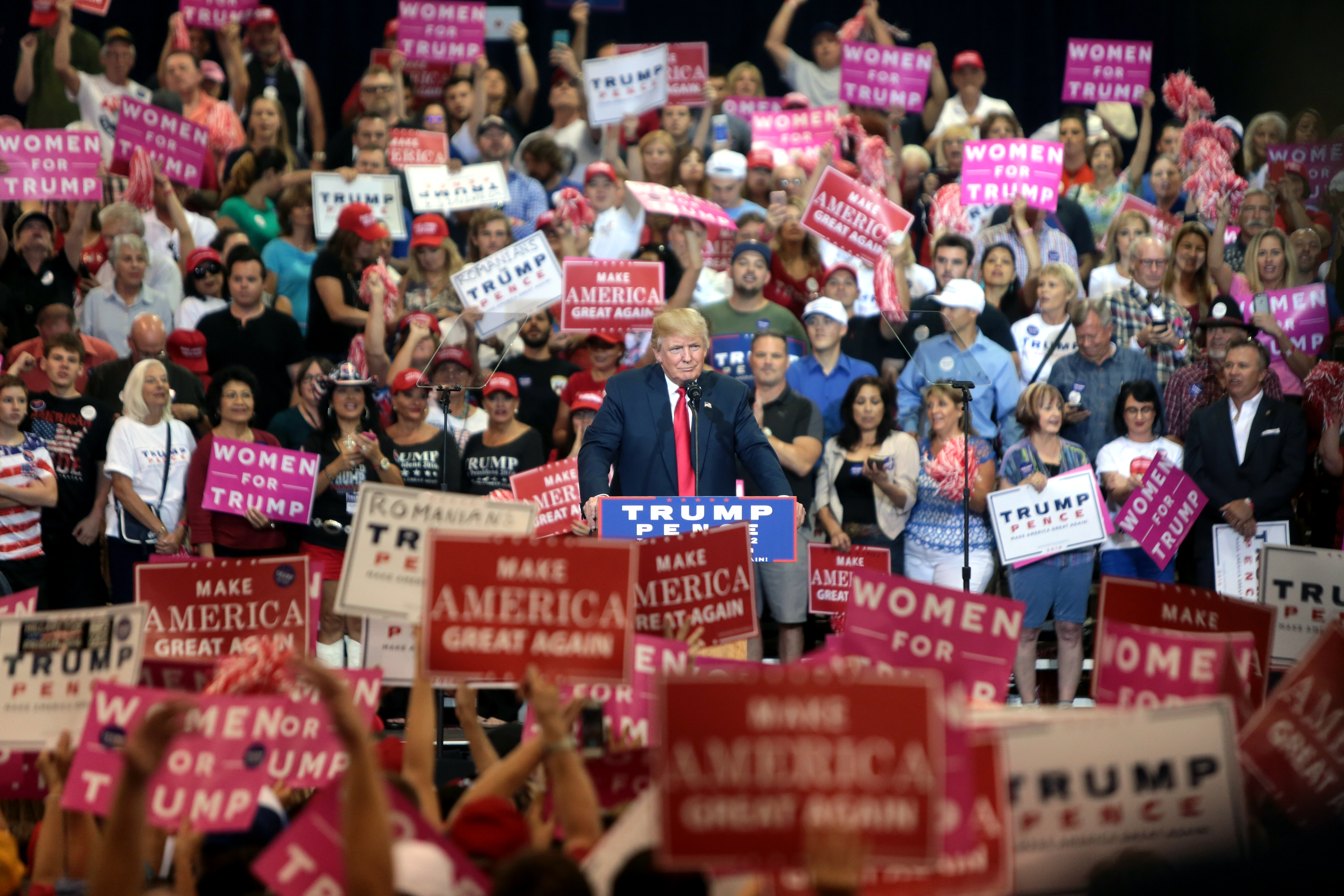
2016 Republican presidential nominee Donald Trump campaigns at a rally in Phoenix, Arizona, October 29, 2016.

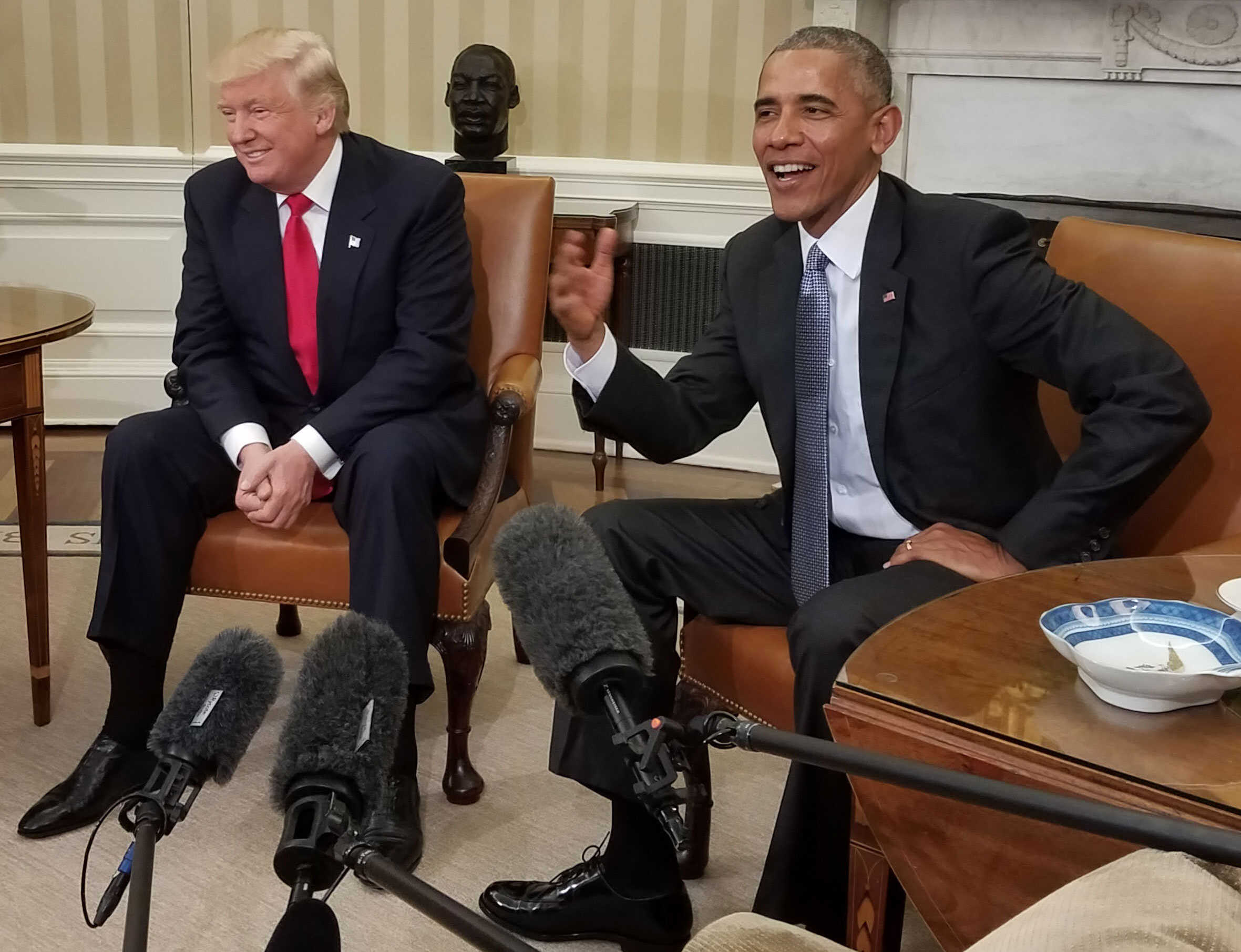
President Obama meets with President-elect Donald Trump at the Oval Office following the latter's victory in the 2016 presidential election, November 10, 2016.

=== 2016 presidential election ===
In 2016, following several cybersecurity incidents, the Obama administration formally accused Russia of engaging in a campaign to undermine the 2016 election, and the administration imposed sanctions on some Russian-linked people and organizations.

Several candidates ran for the Republican presidential nomination in the 2016 presidential election that was won by Donald Trump, who prominently questioned Obama's place of birth during Obama's first term. The Democratic Party had fewer potential candidates to choose from, and the campaign early on centered on Hillary Clinton, former Secretary of State, United States Senator from New York, and First Lady of the United States. A surprise challenger to Clinton appeared in 74-year-old Vermont Senator Bernie Sanders, a self-identified democratic socialist and the one of only two independents in the Senate. Despite attracting a large, enthusiastic following among mostly young voters, Sanders was unable to secure the nomination. When the primary season finished in the spring, Clinton secured the Democratic nomination. By the spring of 2016, most GOP candidates had dropped out of the running aside from Trump, Ted Cruz, and John Kasich. Cruz and Kasich ended their campaigns in May while Sanders conceded the Democratic nomination in July, endorsing the presumptive nominee Hillary Clinton.

The 2016 elections took place on November 8. Obama was term-limited in 2016 due to the 22nd Amendment. In June 2016, with the Democratic primaries nearly complete, Obama endorsed former secretary of state Hillary Clinton as his successor. However, according to Glenn Thrush of Politico, Obama had long supported Clinton as his preferred successor, and Obama dissuaded Vice President Biden from running against Clinton. Obama spoke in favor of Clinton at the 2016 Democratic National Convention, and he continued to campaign for Clinton and other Democrats in the months leading up to Election Day.

As the primaries gave way to the general election, Hillary Clinton faced numerous controversies over her tenure as Secretary of State, namely an email server scandal. Polls and surveys showed that both Clinton and Trump had an overall negative image among voters. Meanwhile, Donald Trump chose as his running mate Indiana Governor Mike Pence. Pence, a staunch conservative Christian, was seen as a way of winning over heartland conservatives, many of whom were Ted Cruz supporters wary of Trump's attitude on social issues. Clinton chose as her running mate Virginia Senator Tim Kaine, seen as a way of connecting with blue collar white voters, Trump's base of support. During the general election, controversies over remarks Donald Trump had made over the years seen as demeaning to women emerged in the press, including a beauty pageant he had been a judge on in the 1990s where he had criticized the appearance of a contestant, as well as a leaked 2005 audio tape in which he made vulgar statements about the treatment of women. Hillary Clinton, however, continued to be embroiled in controversies of her own, the biggest being the revelation that she had used an unsecured private email server during her tenure as Secretary of State, leaving the possibility of having mismanaged or compromised classified documents. In addition, John Podesta, Clinton's campaign manager, had his private email account hacked, releasing over 20,000 campaign emails in October and November 2016 by WikiLeaks.

On Election Day, November 8, Trump carried 306 electoral votes against Clinton's 232. He made considerable inroads into the old Rust Belt, carrying states such as Michigan, Wisconsin and Pennsylvania that had been safe Democratic territory since 1988. However, Donald Trump did not win the popular vote. This was the fifth time in American history that the outcome of the Electoral College did not match the outcome of the popular vote, the others happening in 1824, 1876, 1888, and 2000. The GOP also retained control a majority in both the House of Representatives and the Senate, controlling all branches of government. Allegations of Russian interference on behalf of Trump's candidacy in the 2016 election caused controversy during and after the election.

Trump and Obama frequently communicated during the transition period, and Trump stated that he sought Obama's advice regarding presidential appointments. However, President-elect Trump also criticized some of Obama's actions, including Obama's refusal to veto a UN Resolution condemning Israel settlements. In his farewell address, Obama expressed concerns about a divisive political environment, economic inequality, and racism, but remained optimistic about the future. Obama left office with roughly 8,400 US soldiers remaining in Afghanistan.

=== First Trump administration ===
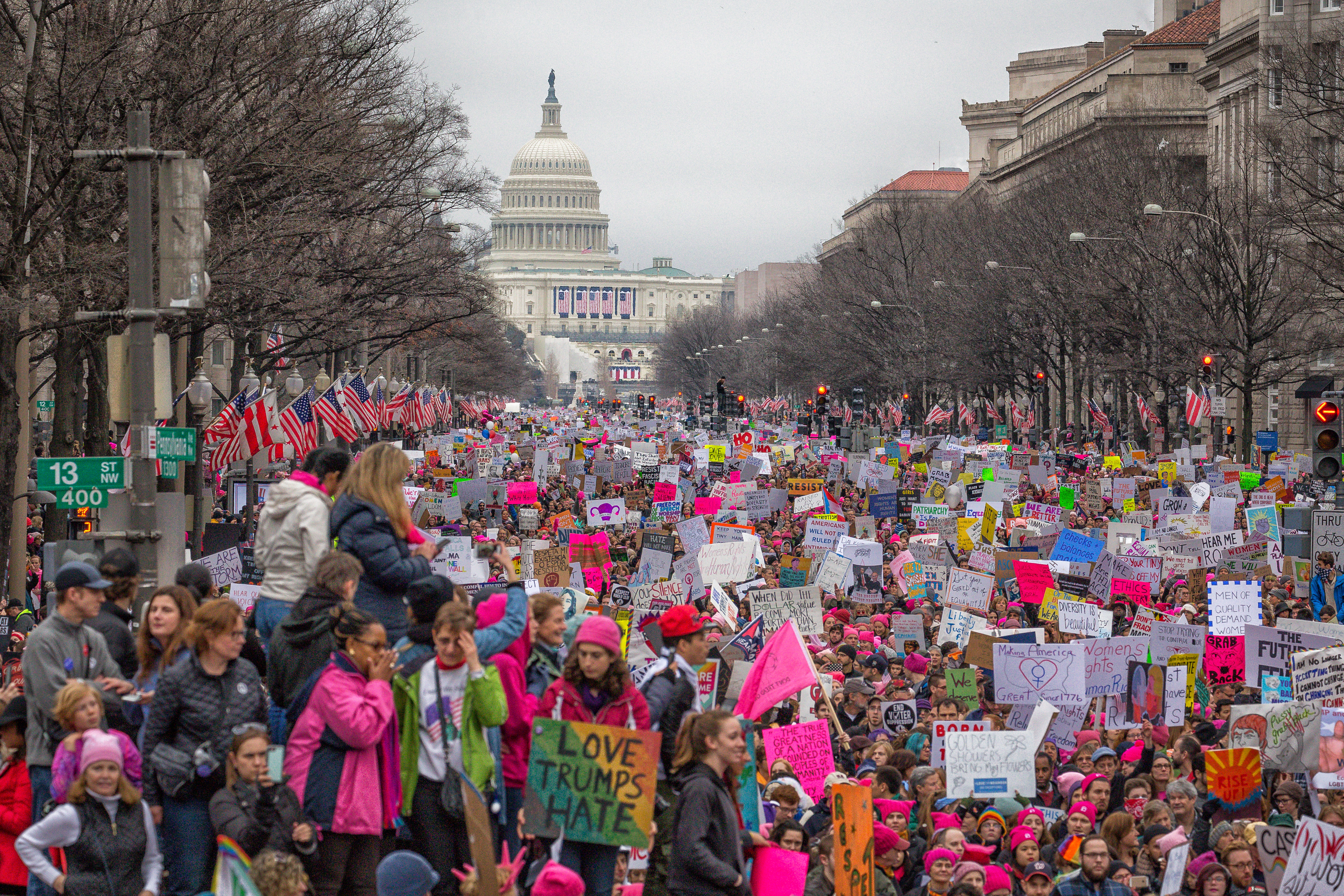
Women's March on Washington protesting Donald Trump

On January 20, 2017, Trump took the oath of office as the 45th US president in the face of large-scale demonstrations from protesters unhappy with the outcome of the election and of the incoming president. On his first day in office, he undertook a series of executive orders aimed at dismantling the Affordable Care Act and Trans-Pacific Partnership, and also moved to pass a temporary ban on refugees from several Middle Eastern states. This last action met with widespread criticism, and the 9th Circuit Court of Appeals dismissed it as unconstitutional. On June 26, the Supreme Court overturned the 9th Circuit's decision, ruling that part of President Trump's executive order is constitutional. One of Trump's major accomplishments was nominating Associate Justice Neil Gorsuch to the Supreme Court. On April 10, Gorsuch was sworn in. In 2018, President Trump nominated Brett Kavanaugh to replace the departing Associate Justice Anthony Kennedy. The nomination process soon became contentious after several women, most notably Palo Alto University psychology professor Christine Blasey Ford, accused Kavanaugh of past instances of sexual assault. After a series of hearings, the US Senate voted to confirm Kavanaugh despite the controversy.

In 2017, Robert Mueller was appointed as special counsel to investigate Russian's involvement in the 2016 election, including allegations of conspiracy or coordination between Trump's presidential campaign and Russia. The Mueller Report, released in 2019, concludes that Russia undertook a sustained social media campaign and cyberhacking operation to bolster the Trump campaign. The report did not reach a conclusion on allegations that the Trump campaign had colluded with Russia, but, according to Mueller, his investigation did not find evidence "sufficient to charge any member of the [Trump] campaign with taking part in a criminal conspiracy."

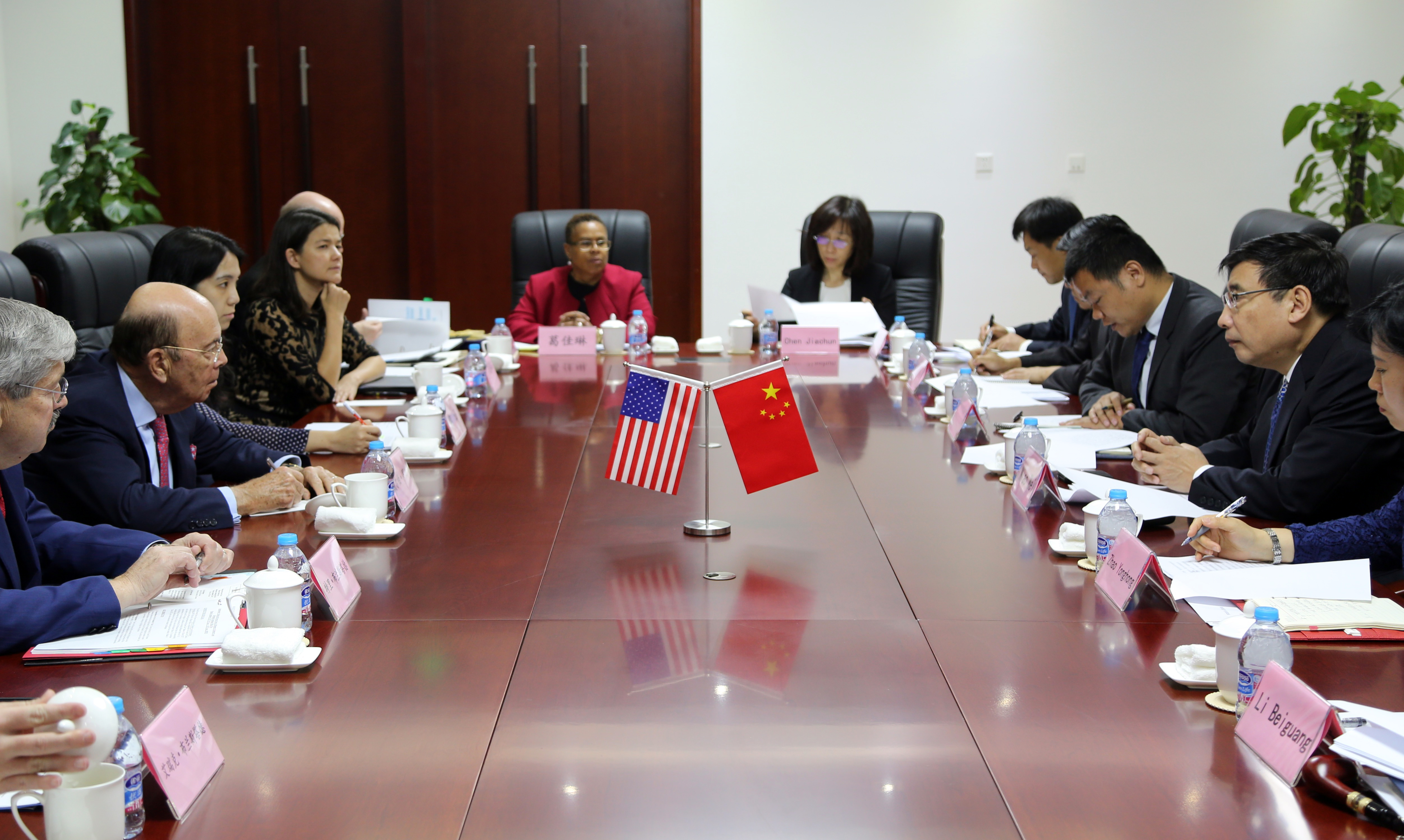
US Secretary of Commerce Wilbur Ross meets with Chinese Minister of Industry and Information Technology Miao Wei, Beijing, September 2017 a meeting dealing with the China–United States trade war.

In December 2017, Congress passed and President Trump signed into law the Tax Cuts and Jobs Act of 2017. The Act amended the Internal Revenue Code of 1986 based on tax reform advocated by congressional Republicans and the Trump administration. Major elements include reducing tax rates for businesses and individuals; a personal tax simplification by increasing the standard deduction and family tax credits, but eliminating personal exemptions and making it less beneficial to itemize deductions; limiting deductions for state and local income taxes (SALT) and property taxes; further limiting the mortgage interest deduction; reducing the alternative minimum tax for individuals and eliminating it for corporations; reducing the number of estates impacted by the estate tax; and repealing the individual shared responsibility provision of the Affordable Care Act (ACA). The nonpartisan Congressional Budget Office (CBO) reported that, under the Act, individuals and pass-through entities like partnerships and S corporations would receive about $1,125 billion in net benefits (i.e. net tax cuts offset by reduced healthcare subsidies) over 10 years, while corporations would receive around $320 billion in benefits. The individual and pass-through tax cuts fade over time and become net tax increases starting in 2027 while the corporate tax cuts are permanent. This enabled the Senate to pass the bill with only 51 votes, without the need to defeat a filibuster, under the budget reconciliation process. Tax cuts were reflected in individual worker paychecks as early as February 2018 and with the corporate tax rate being reduced from 35% to 21%, numerous major American corporations announced across-the-board pay raises and bonuses for their workers, expanded benefits and programs, and investments in capital improvements.

Trump announced plans to withdraw the United States from the Paris Climate Agreement in June 2017. The agreement prevented any country from leaving less than three years after it began, so the United States had to wait until November 4, 2019, to officially start the withdrawal process. After a mandatory one-year waiting period, the country left on November 4, 2020.

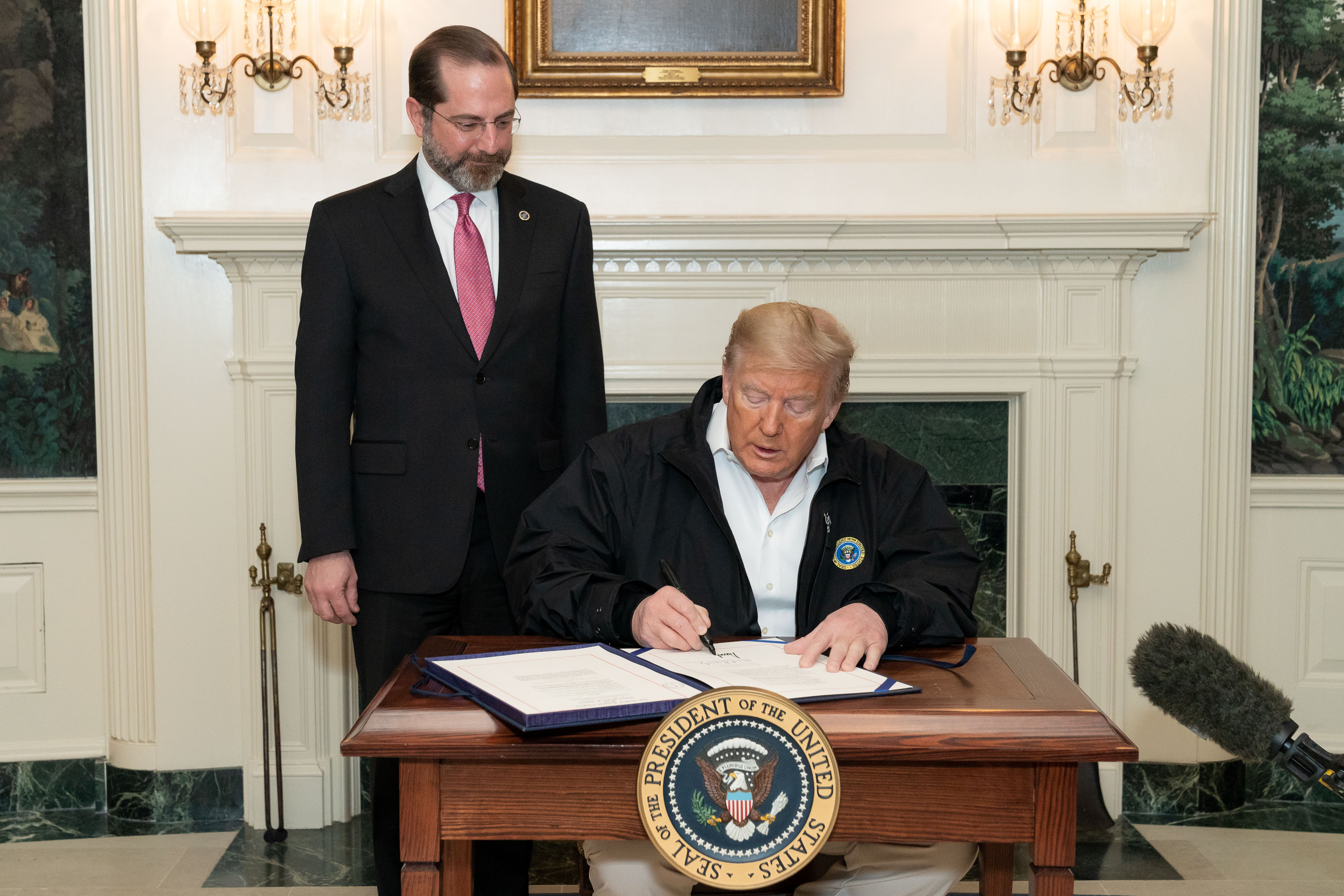
President Trump signs the Coronavirus Preparedness and Response Supplemental Appropriations Act into law on March 6, 2020.

On May 9, 2018, the Trump Administration withdrew from the Joint Comprehensive Plan of Action (JCPOA) (also known as the Iran Nuclear Deal) with Iran, and other Great Powers, over alleged violations of the agreement by the Iranians in regards toward their nuclear program.

The effects of the tax cuts resulted in the US economy stabilizing for a short period between early 2018 and September 2019. During that time, the 2018 midterm elections took place. The elections had the highest voter turnout of any midterm election since 1914; the Democratic Party regained majority control of the House of Representatives and the Republican Party expanded their majority in the Senate even though they received a minority of the popular vote.

In October 2019, the Federal Reserve announced that it would conduct a repurchase agreement operation to provide funds in the repo markets after the overnight lending rates spiked well above the Fed's target rate during the week of September 16.

At that time, the United States began to feel the effects of a global synchronized economic slowdown that began after global growth peaked in 2017 and industrial output started to decline in 2018. The International Monetary Fund blamed 'heightened trade and geopolitical tensions' as the main reason for the slowdown, citing Brexit and the China–United States trade war as primary reasons for slowdown in 2019, while other economists blamed liquidity issues.

On December 18, 2019, the House of Representatives brought forth two articles of impeachment (abuse of power and obstruction of Congress) against President Trump. Both articles were passed, impeaching Trump. Trump became the third president in American history to be impeached, after Andrew Johnson and Bill Clinton.

On December 20, 2019, Trump signed the 2020 National Defense Authorization Act, establishing the United States Space Force as the sixth armed service branch, with Air Force General John "Jay" Raymond, the head of Air Force Space Command and US Space Command, becoming the first Chief of Space Operations.

On January 3, 2020, President Trump responded to an attack on the US Embassy in Baghdad by ordering a drone strike against the Islamic Revolutionary Guard Corps's commanding general Qasem Soleimani and the Popular Mobilization Forces leader Abu Mahdi al-Muhandis at Baghdad International Airport. The incident sharply escalated a period of already strong tensions with Iran and lead to missile strikes on US military forces in Iraq on January 8, 2020. At the same time, Iranian military forces mistakenly shot down Ukraine International Airlines Flight 752, leading to domestic unrest and international condemnation.

In June 2020, the Supreme Court ruled against the Trump administration's order to rescind Deferred Action for Childhood Arrivals (DACA), saying the administration had not provided adequate reasoning under the Administrative Procedure Act. DACA is a United States immigration policy that allows some individuals with unlawful presence in the United States after being brought to the country as children to receive a renewable two-year period of deferred action from deportation and become eligible for a work permit in the US. To be eligible for the program, recipients cannot have felonies or serious misdemeanors on their records. Unlike the proposed DREAM Act, DACA does not provide a path to citizenship for recipients.

In September 2020, the death of Associate Justice Ruth Bader Ginsburg prompted President Trump to nominate Amy Coney Barrett to fill the Supreme Court vacancy. Barrett's nomination was controversial because of its proximity to the 2020 presidential election. The Senate voted to confirm Barrett in a partisan vote.

=== 2020 presidential election ===
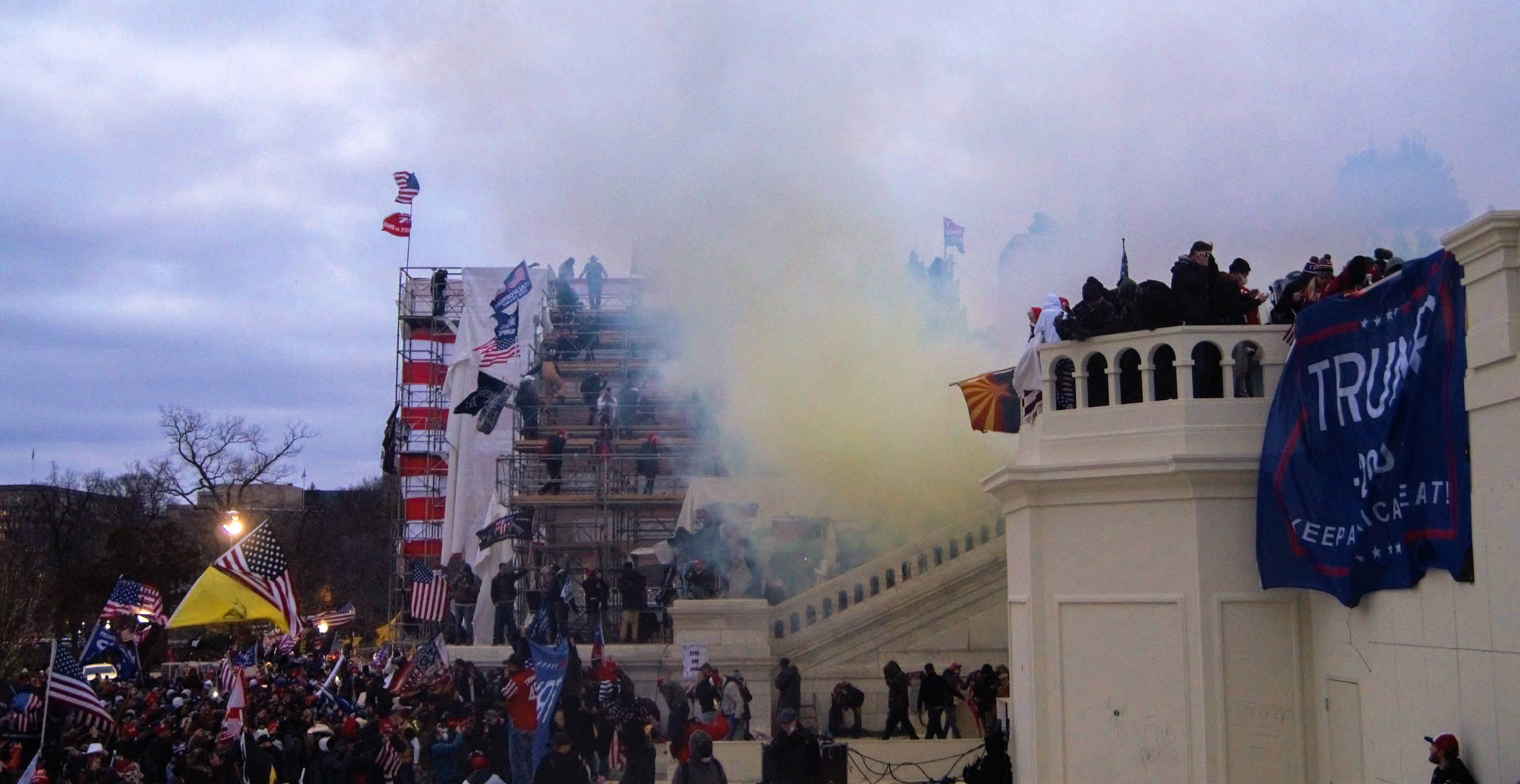
Police release tear gas outside the United States Capitol at the January 6 United States Capitol attack.

President Trump lost the 2020 presidential election to Joe Biden, who previously served as Vice President under President Barack Obama. He became the first president to lose the popular vote in both elections contested, as well as the first president since George H. W. Bush's loss in 1992 to be defeated after his single term. Biden himself became the oldest person to win a United States presidential election and was the oldest president upon his inauguration. The election also saw Kamala Harris become the first woman, as well as first person of African-American and Asian-American ancestry, to be elected as Vice President.

In the aftermath of the election, Trump and numerous other Republicans repeatedly made false claims that widespread electoral fraud had occurred and that only he had legitimately won the election. (Note: Attributed to multiple references:) Attorney General William Barr and officials in each of the 50 states found no evidence of fraud (widespread or otherwise) or irregularities in the election. Although most resulting lawsuits were either dismissed or ruled against by numerous courts, (Note: Attributed to multiple references:) Trump nonetheless conspired with his campaign team to submit documents in several states (all of which had been won by Biden) which falsely claimed to be legitimate electoral votes for President Trump and Vice President Mike Pence. (Note: Attributed to multiple references:) After the submission of these documents, the Trump campaign intended that the Presiding Officer of the United States Senate, either President of the Senate Pence or President pro tempore Chuck Grassley, would claim to have the unilateral power to reject electors during the January 6, 2021, vote counting session; the presiding officer would reject all electors from the several states in which the Trump campaign had submitted false documents, leaving 232 votes for Trump and 222 votes for Biden, thereby overturning the election results in favour of Trump. (Note: Attributed to multiple references:) The plans for January 6 failed to come to fruition after Pence refused to follow the campaign's proposals. (Note: Attributed to multiple references:) Trump nevertheless urged his supporters on January 6, 2021, to march to the Capitol while the joint session of Congress was assembled there to count electoral votes and formalize Biden's victory, leading to hundreds storming the building and interrupting the electoral vote count; as a result, the House impeached Trump for incitement of insurrection on January 13, 2021, making him the only federal officeholder in American history to be impeached twice. The Senate would later acquit him for the second time on February 13, 2021, after he had already left office. On January 7, Trump acknowledged the incoming administration without mentioning Biden's name. Trump was later indicted in August 2023 over his role, as well as for other criminal proceedings including his mishandling of classified documents and hush money payments.

=== Biden administration ===
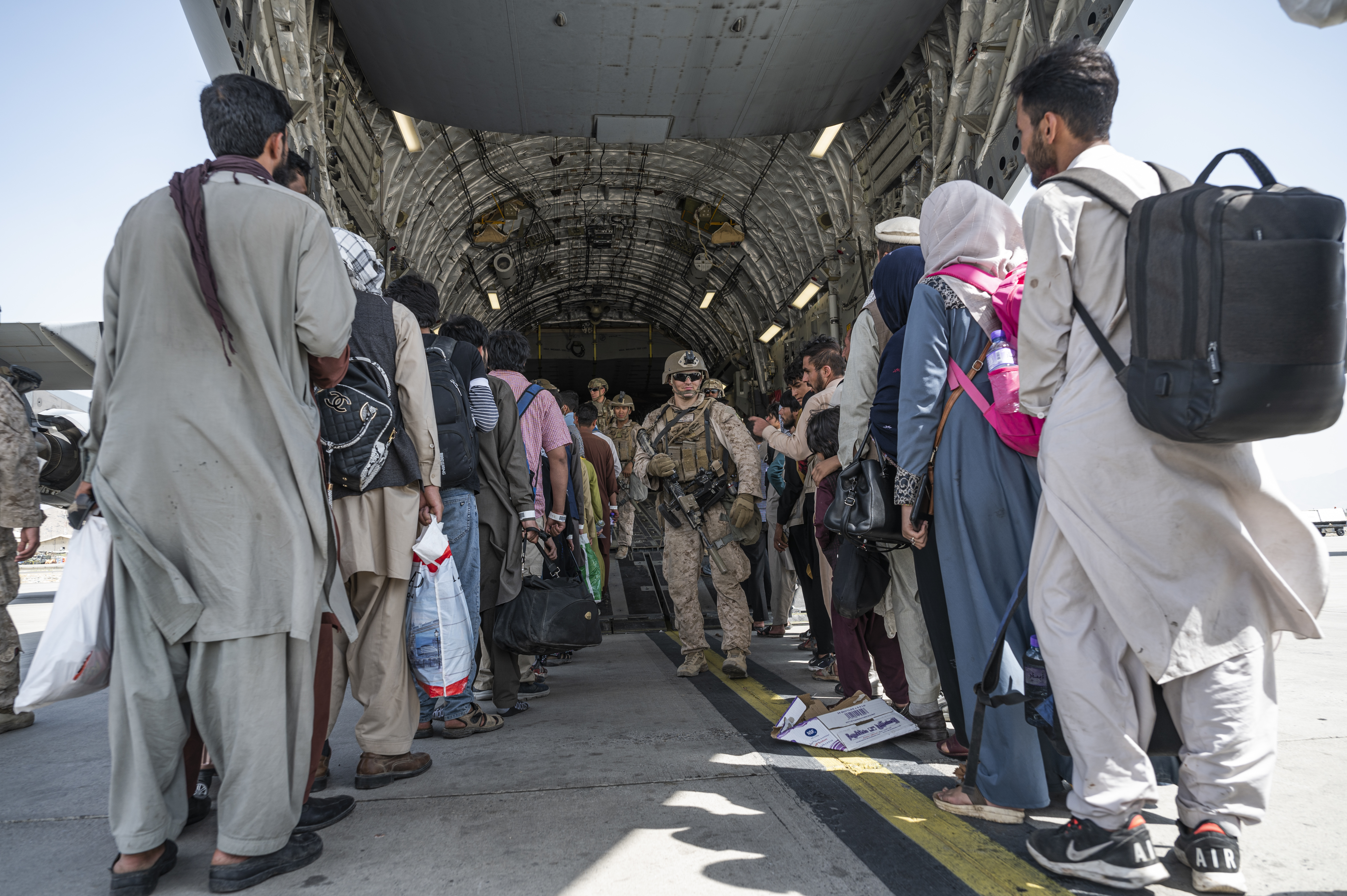
Afghanistan withdrawal and Kabul airlift, August 2021

Joe Biden was inaugurated on January 20, 2021. He was the oldest president at his inauguration at 78 years old beating his predecessor Donald Trump's record of 70, but a new record was set by Trump again in 2025 after he won re-election. His vice president, Kamala Harris, was elected alongside Biden and is the first female vice president in American history.

On the first day of his presidency, Biden made an effort to revert President Trump's energy policy by restoring U.S. participation in the Paris Agreement and revoking the permit for the Keystone XL pipeline. He also halted funding for the Mexico–United States border wall. On his second day, he issued a series of executive orders to reduce the impact of COVID-19, including invoking the Defense Production Act of 1950, and set an early goal of achieving one hundred million COVID-19 vaccinations in the United States in his first 100 days.

Biden signed into law the American Rescue Plan Act of 2021; a $1.9 trillion stimulus bill that temporarily established expanded unemployment insurance and sent $1,400 stimulus checks to most Americans in response to continued economic pressure from COVID-19. He signed the bipartisan Infrastructure Investment and Jobs Act; a ten-year plan brokered by Biden alongside Democrats and Republicans in Congress, to invest in American roads, bridges, public transit, ports and broadband access. He appointed Ketanji Brown Jackson to the U.S. Supreme Court—the first Black woman to serve the court. Biden proposed a significant expansion of the U.S. social safety net through the Build Back Better Act, but those efforts, along with voting rights legislation, failed in Congress. However, in August 2022, Biden signed the Inflation Reduction Act of 2022, a domestic appropriations bill that included some of the provisions of the Build Back Better Act after the entire bill failed to pass. It included significant federal investment in climate and domestic clean energy production, tax credits for solar panels, electric cars and other home energy programs as well as a three-year extension of Affordable Care Act subsidies. From June 2022 until the loss of Democratic control of the House following the 2022 midterm elections, Biden went on a string of legislative achievements including: the Bipartisan Safer Communities Act; the CHIPS and Science Act, a massive investment in the semiconductor industry and manufacturing; Honoring our PACT Act of 2022, expansion of veterans healthcare; and the Respect for Marriage Act, repealing the Defense of Marriage Act and codifying same-sex and interracial marriage. Republican control of the House following the 2022 midterm elections led to the 118th Congress being described by commentators as the least productive Congress in decades. Following a record long election for speaker in January 2023, House Speaker Kevin McCarthy (R-CA) was ousted from his position on October 3, 2023, marking the first time a Speaker of the House in US history had been voted out. A new Speaker, Mike Johnson (R-LA) was elected on October 25.

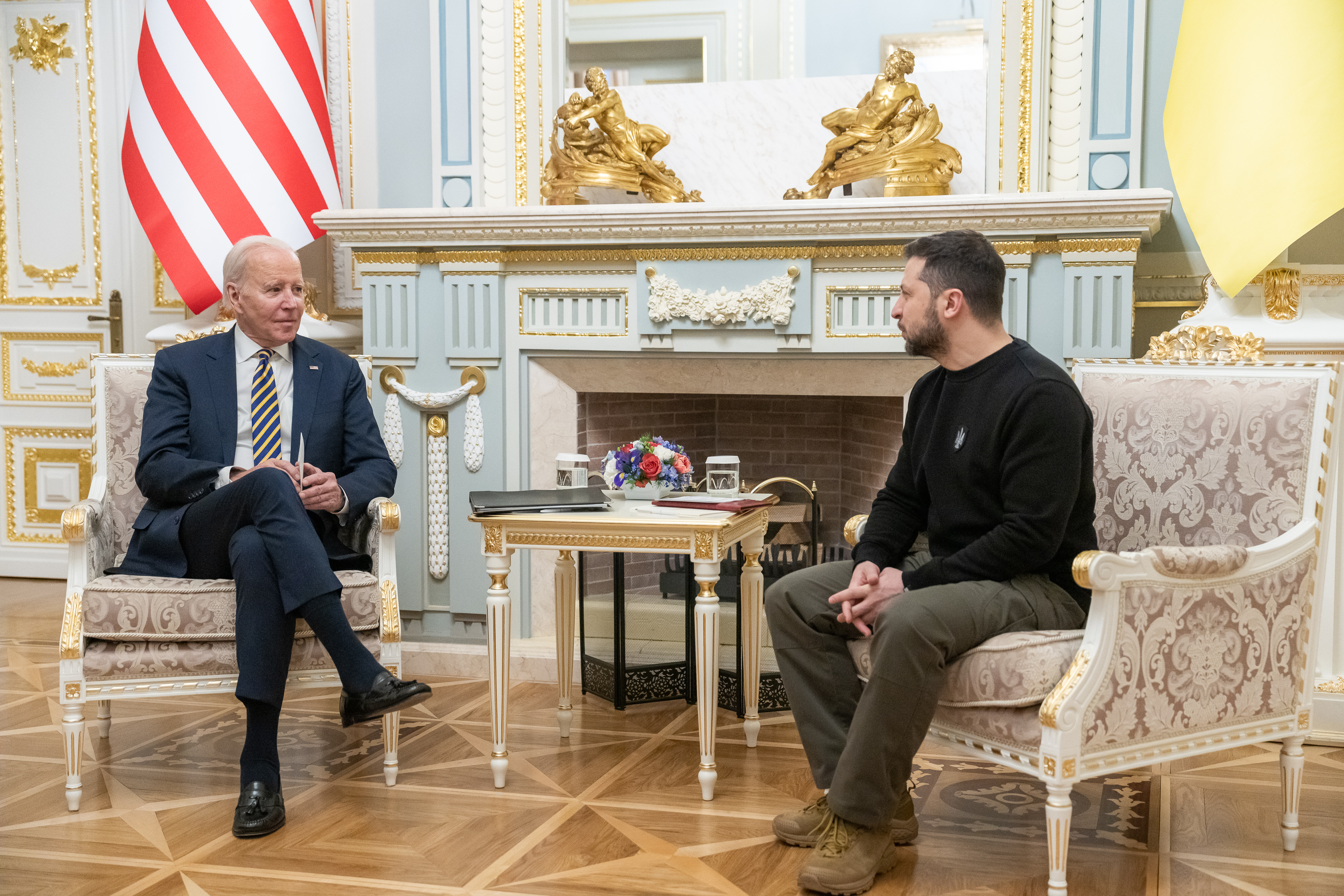
President Biden meeting with Ukrainian President Volodymyr Zelenskyy, February 2023

In foreign policy, Biden completed the withdrawal of U.S. military forces from Afghanistan, declaring an end to nation-building efforts and shifting U.S. foreign policy toward strategic competition with China and, to a lesser extent, Russia. However, during the withdrawal, the Afghan government collapsed and the Taliban seized control, leading to Biden receiving bipartisan criticism. He responded to the Russian invasion of Ukraine in February 2022 by imposing sanctions on Russia as well as providing Ukraine with over $100 billion in combined military, economic, and humanitarian aid. Biden also approved a raid which led to the death of Abu Ibrahim al-Hashimi al-Qurashi, the leader of the Islamic State, and approved a drone strike which killed Ayman Al Zawahiri, leader of Al-Qaeda. Biden called for the expansion of NATO with the addition of Finland and Sweden, and rallied NATO allies in support of Ukraine.

After the October 7 attacks on Israel, President Biden promised Israeli Prime Minister Benjamin Netanyahu that he would support Israel and the United States gave Israel military aid. A number of Americans were among those taken as hostages by Hamas during the attack and a number of Americans also died. However, Biden did criticize Israeli forces bombing the Gaza Strip because of the civilian presence there saying Israeli actions should be done with trying to prevent the possibility of "'...innocent Palestinian civilians...'" from being either "'...hurt, murdered, killed, lost'". After a number of ships were attacked in the Red Sea by the Yemeni Houthis, Operation Prosperity Guardian; an international force led by the US to protect ships in the Red Sea was created in December to counteract these attacks. In response to further attacks on shipping a series of airstrikes were done in Yemen upon them in January 2024 and later in February also. The United States gave humanitarian aid to the Palestinians in Gaza during the Israel-Hamas War and built a floating pier on May 17 to help deliver aid as land borders into it were often closed. Later that month Biden proposed a ceasefire under the conditions of: an Israeli withdrawal from "densely populated areas in Gaza, swapping prisoners along with hostages and allowing for humanitarian assistance. A series of controversial protests at university campuses happened across the country as a result of the Israel-Hamas war.

=== 2024 presidential election ===
In the 2024 United States presidential election, Donald Trump announced his intention to run on November 22, 2022, while Joe Biden announced his intent to run for re-election on April 25, 2023. Both President Biden and Donald Trump became the presumptive nominees for their respective parties on March 12, 2024. During the campaign, Trump was found guilty in court of falsifying 34 counts of business records relating to his 2016 campaign on May 31 making him the first former US President to be convicted of a felony crime. Later on the campaign trail on July 13 Trump was subjected to an assassination attempt. Trump selected US Senator JD Vance as his running mate on July 15. A presidential debate was held between both President Biden and former President Trump on June 27, 2024, making it the earliest held presidential debate until that point. As a result of widespread Democratic concern, Biden dropped out of the race the next month. With President Biden announcing his withdrawal, Vice President Kamala Harris announced that same day she would be running for president, with Biden immediately endorsing her. Harris selected Minnesota Governor Tim Walz as her running mate on August 6. Harris became the presumptive nominee on August 2 before later on becoming the official one when she accepted the Democratic presidential nomination on August 22. Trump and Harris participated in one presidential debate together on September 10 while Vance and Walz had a debate on October 1.

=== Second Trump administration ===
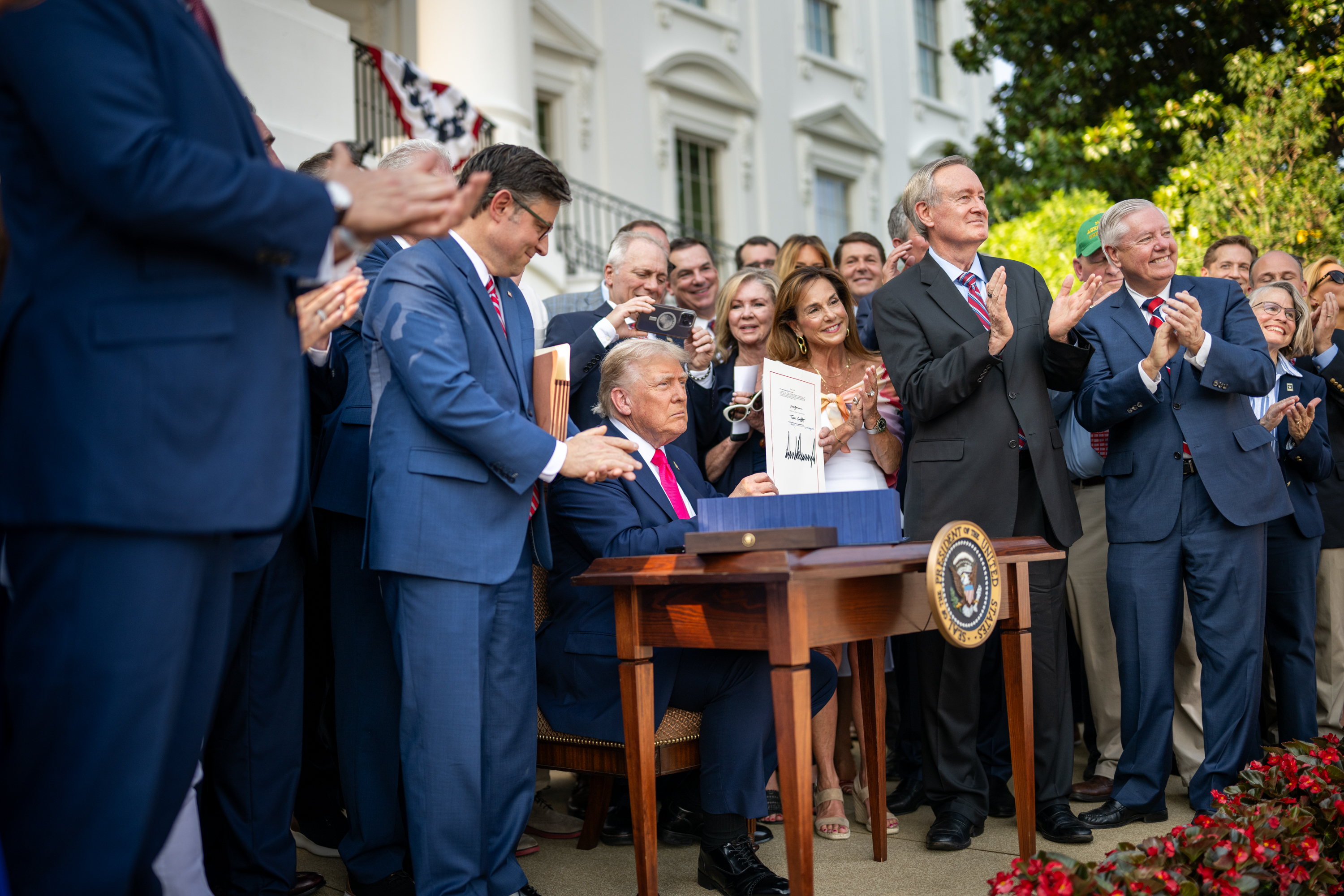
By signing the One Big Beautiful Bill Act on July 4, 2025, Trump delivers changes to the national budget; cuts to Medicaid, funds for border security, $4 trillion added to the deficit.

Donald Trump was reelected in the 2024 presidential election to a second non-consecutive term and Vice President Harris conceded to and congratulated Donald Trump on November 6 after his victory in the election. Donald Trump became the second nonconsecutive elected president being the first since Grover Cleveland was reelected to a second term in 1892. This time, Donald Trump won both the electoral college and popular vote as opposed to 2016 where he won the electoral college but not the popular vote. Trump was inaugurated for a second time on January 20, 2025, with the ceremony being held inside the US Capitol building rotunda as it was deemed to be too cold to host it outside making it the first one to be held indoors since the second inauguration of Ronald Reagan in 1985. He is the oldest president at his inauguration at 78 years old, beating his predecessor Joe Biden's record by several months. His vice president, JD Vance, was elected alongside Trump.

On the day Donald Trump became president he renamed the United States Digital Service to the Department of Government Efficiency (DOGE) which was headed by Elon Musk, a strong ally of the president, and froze all foreign assistance money via an executive order. Elon Musk said his goal with the department was to reduce the federal workforce and the US national debt along with eliminating what is deemed as waste. Elon would later leave DOGE in April 2025 after Tesla's profits fell. Also on inauguration day, Trump would sign an executive order renaming Denali to Mount McKinley and the Gulf of Mexico to the "Gulf of America". President Trump signed 10 executive orders regarding immigration on the day he took office. Despite intense media coverage during Trump's first 98 days the average number of daily immigration arrests and removals was close to that of the 2024 Fiscal Year under President Biden according to TRAC Reports; the number of unauthorized border crossings in the southwest declined dramatically continuing an already existing trend of them declining.

During President Trump's first 100 days in office during his second term he would sign a record 217 executive orders surpassing a record held by President Franklin Delano Roosevelt who signed 99 in his first 100 days in office. Executive orders have been met with controversy regarding their legality.

In March 2025 Donald Trump placed a 25% tariff on most Mexican and Canadian imports along with increasing tariffs from 10% to 20% on Chinese exports during February. Trump attempted to negotiate a peace deal involving Russia and Ukraine. Protests broke out in Los Angeles over Immigration and Customs Enforcement (ICE) raids targeting illegal immigrants starting on June 6. President Trump responded by authorizing 2,000 California National Guard soldiers on June 7 be sent to Los Angeles; despite the objections of the mayor and California governor Gavin Newsom toward President Trump doing so. This was the first time a state National Guard was federalized since 1965 without the approval of a state governor beforehand. US Marines were also deployed to Los Angeles in response. 2,000 more National Guard soldiers were announced to be sent into Los Angeles on June 17. Federal troops were largely withdrawn (all US Marines deployed were withdrawn) in July with the remaining going to protect federal buildings and do firefighting; with 2,000 National Guard soldiers being withdrawn on July 12 and another 1,350 on July 30. Also in June, President Trump held a military parade in Washington, D.C. to commemorate the 250th anniversary of the founding of the US Army and No Kings protests were held throughout the country protesting against Donald Trump with several million participating in the protests. During the Twelve-Day War in June 2025, President Trump responded by conducting an air strike alongside Israel on suspected nuclear sites and later helped with negotiating a ceasefire between Israel and Iran.

A bill called the One Big Beautiful Bill containing much of President Trump's political agenda was signed by him on July 4. Features of the One Big Beautiful Bill include but were not limited to: reducing spending for Medicaid and adding a work requirement, increases funding for immigration and border control, increases military spending and eliminates taxes on tips along with taxes on overtime. Starting in July the Trump Administration faced controversy regarding the release of files pertaining to Jeffrey Epstein. Later that month on July 18 another bill was signed by President Trump, the GENIUS Act. The GENIUS ACT which is the first law to regulate cryptocurrency with the act regulating stablecoins. After a DOGE staffer was beaten during a carjacking attempt on his car in Washington, D.C. President Trump activated the National Guard in Washington and took control of the city's police force. Under the District of Columbia's home rule system the US president can take control of the municipal police force for 30 days if the US President deems it necessary. When US National Guard troops were in Washington DC, two soldiers were shot with one dying.

During the fall a variety of events would happen. On September 10, Charlie Kirk, a prominent right-wing activist and staunch Trump ally, was assassinated. During October the East Wing of the White House was demolished with plans in place to replace it with a ballroom. The Trump administration would also deploy the National Guard to several other cities including Memphis with President Trump citing crime in the city for the reason troops were being deployed and that the city has a higher crime rate than the national average. Trump also deployed the National Guard to Chicago in October. Another round of No Kings protests also happened in October. A government shutdown also happened which lasted for 43 days setting a new record. The Epstein Files Transparency Act was passed in November requiring full disclosure of all files. Some of the files were released prior to the act passing such as one drop by the US House in September 2025. Also that November DOGE officially disbanded.

Several events happened in 2026 pertaining to the Trump administration. In February 2026 another round of Epstein files were released. 2026 also saw a number of resignations in the Trump cabinet including Attorney General Pam Bondi, Labor Secretary Lori Chavez-DeRemer, DHS Secretary Kristi Noem and Director of National Intelligence Tulsi Gabbard who announced in May she would resign on June 30. To celebrate the United States Semiquincentennial two organizations were formed: America250 and Freedom250 with America250 being a non-partisan group which was formed in 2016 while Freedom250 was created by the Trump administration.

== Foreign relations ==
=== War in Afghanistan (2016–2021) ===
Although the Obama administration originally intended to fully withdraw from Afghanistan, failing peace talks and the emergence of ISIS in the country caused the War in Afghanistan to continue on into the Trump Administration. On February 25, 2019, negotiations began between the Taliban and the United States in Qatar and resumed again in December of that year. On February 29, 2020, the United States and the Taliban signed a conditional peace deal in Doha, Qatar, that called for a prisoner exchange within ten days and was supposed to lead to US troops withdrawal from Afghanistan by May 1, 2021.

On April 13, 2021, newly elected President Joe Biden announced his revised plan to withdraw all troops from Afghanistan by September 11, 2021, this date being the twentieth anniversary of the September 11 attacks. The date for US troops to withdraw from Afghanistan was moved forward to August 31. The withdrawal of US soldiers and other foreign soldiers coincided with the 2021 Taliban offensive, where the Taliban defeated the Afghan Armed Forces culminating with the fall of Kabul on August 15, 2021. On the same day, the president of Afghanistan Ashraf Ghani fled to Tajikistan and the Taliban declared victory and the war had ended. Following a massive airlift of more than 120,000 people, the US military mission in Afghanistan ended on August 30, 2021.

=== Wars in Iraq and Syria (2016–2024) ===
In September 2015, Russian forces launched their military intervention in Syria to support that country's ally Bashar al-Assad in the fight against the Islamic State. Although Moscow officially portrayed its intervention as an anti-IS campaign and publicly declared support for the "patriotic Syrian opposition", the vast majority of its bombings were focused on destroying bases of the Syrian opposition militias of the Free Syrian Army (FSA) and Southern Front. On the other hand, United States and its Western allies have been opposed to the Ba'athist regime for its purported state-sponsorship of terrorism, violent repression of Syrian revolution and extensive use of chemical weapons. The US-led coalition trained, equipped and supported secular Free Syrian and Kurdish militias opposed to the Assad government during its anti-IS campaign. In the months following the beginning of both air campaigns, IS began to lose ground in both Iraq and Syria. Civilian deaths from airstrikes began to mount in 2015 and 2016. In mid-2016, the US and Russia] planned to begin coordinating their airstrikes; however, this coordination did not materialize.

In August 2016, Turkey launched a multi-pronged invasion of northern Syria. Turkey helped establish the Syrian National Army (SNA) in 2017. The Islamic State was defeated in the Raqqa and Deir ez-Zor offensives, returning to a weakened insurgency in 2017. On December 9, 2017, Iraq declared victory in the fight against ISIL and stated that the War in Iraq was over. On March 23, 2019, IS was defeated territorially in Syria after losing the Battle of Baghuz Fawqani, after which the group was forced into an insurgency. IS's leader, Abu Bakr al-Baghdadi, died during a US special operations raid in northern Syria in October 2019 and was succeeded by Abu Ibrahim al-Hashimi al-Qurashi. The United Nations estimated in August 2020 that over 10,000 IS fighters remained in Syria and Iraq, mainly as sleeper cells. Between the March 2020 Idlib ceasefire and late 2024, front line fighting in Syria mostly subsided but there were regular clashes in Idlib Governate.

13 years after the start of the Syrian civil war, the Assad regime fell in 2024 after a series of rebel offensives.

=== Russo-Ukrainian War (2016–present) ===
The Russo-Ukrainian War began in February 2014 when after Ukraine's Revolution of Dignity, Russia occupied and annexed Crimea from Ukraine and supported pro-Russian separatists who began fighting the Ukrainian military in the Donbas War. These first eight years of conflict also included naval incidents and cyberwarfare. By August 2014, both sides had implemented economic, financial, and diplomatic sanctions upon each other: virtually all Western countries, led by the US and European Union, imposed punitive measures on Russia, which introduced retaliatory measures.

Some political analysts argue that Russia's annexation of Crimea marked the beginning of a Second Cold War between Russia and the West or NATO. In 2014, notable figures such as USSR leader Mikhail Gorbachev warned, against the backdrop of a confrontation between Russia and the West over the Russo-Ukrainian War, that the world was on the brink of a new cold war, or that it was already occurring. The American political scientist Robert Legvold also believes it started in 2013 during the Ukraine crisis. Others argued that the term did not accurately describe the nature of relations between Russia and the West. In October 2016, John Sawers, a former MI6 chief, said he thought the world was entering an era that was possibly "more dangerous" than the Cold War, as "we do not have that focus on a strategic relationship between Moscow and Washington". Similarly, Igor Zevelev, a fellow at the Wilson Center, said that "it's not a Cold War [but] a much more dangerous and unpredictable situation". CNN opined: "It's not a new Cold War. It's not even a deep chill. It's an outright conflict".

In January 2017, former US government adviser Molly K. McKew said at Politico that the US would win a new cold war. The New Republic editor Jeet Heer dismissed the possibility as "equally troubling[,] reckless threat inflation, wildly overstating the extent of Russian ambitions and power in support of a costly policy", and too centred on Russia while "ignoring the rise of powers like China and India". Heer also criticised McKew for suggesting the possibility. Jeremy Shapiro, a senior fellow in the Brookings Institution, wrote in his blog post at RealClearPolitics, referring to the US–Russia relations: "A drift into a new Cold War has seemed the inevitable result".

Speaking to the press in Berlin on November 8, 2019, a day before the 30th anniversary of the fall of the Berlin Wall, US Secretary of State Mike Pompeo warned of the dangers posed by Russia and China and specifically accused Russia, "led by a former KGB officer once stationed in Dresden", of invading its neighbours and crushing dissent. Jonathan Marcus of the BBC opined that Pompeo's words "appeared to be declaring the outbreak of a second [Cold War]".

Beginning in 2021, there was a massive Russian military buildup near Ukraine's borders, including within neighbouring Belarus. Russian officials repeatedly denied plans to attack Ukraine. Russia's president Vladimir Putin voiced expansionist views and denied Ukraine had a right to exist. He demanded that Ukraine be barred from ever joining the NATO military alliance. In early 2022, Russia recognized the Donetsk People's Republic and Luhansk People's Republic as independent states. While Russian troops surrounded Ukraine, its proxies stepped up attacks on Ukrainian forces in the Donbas.

On February 24, 2022, Putin announced a "special military operation" to "demilitarize and denazify" Ukraine, claiming Russia had no plans to occupy the country. What followed was a full-scale invasion of Ukraine in which Russia began occupying more of the country. It was the biggest conflict in Europe since World War II. The war has resulted in a refugee crisis and tens of thousands of deaths. The Russian invasion was internationally condemned; many countries imposed sanctions against Russia, and sent humanitarian and military aid to Ukraine.

In the face of fierce resistance, Russia abandoned an attempt to take Kyiv in early April. In August, Ukrainian forces began liberating territories in the north-east and south. In September, Russia declared the annexation of four partially-occupied provinces, which was internationally condemned. From then through 2023, Russian offensives and Ukrainian counteroffensives gained only small amounts of territory. The invasion has also led to attacks in Russia by Ukrainian and Ukrainian-backed forces, among them a cross-border offensive into Russia's Kursk region in August 2024. Russia has repeatedly carried out deliberate and indiscriminate attacks on civilians far from the frontline. The International Criminal Court (ICC) opened an investigation into war crimes and issued arrest warrants for Putin and several other Russian officials. Since the Russian full-scale invasion of Ukraine, Russian forces forcibly occupied many parts of Ukraine. Soon after, journalist H. D. S. Greenway cited the Russian invasion of Ukraine and February 4 joint statement between Russia and China (under Putin and Xi Jinping) as one of the signs that Cold War II had officially begun. In June 2022, journalist Gideon Rachman asserted the Russian invasion of Ukraine as the start of a second Cold War.

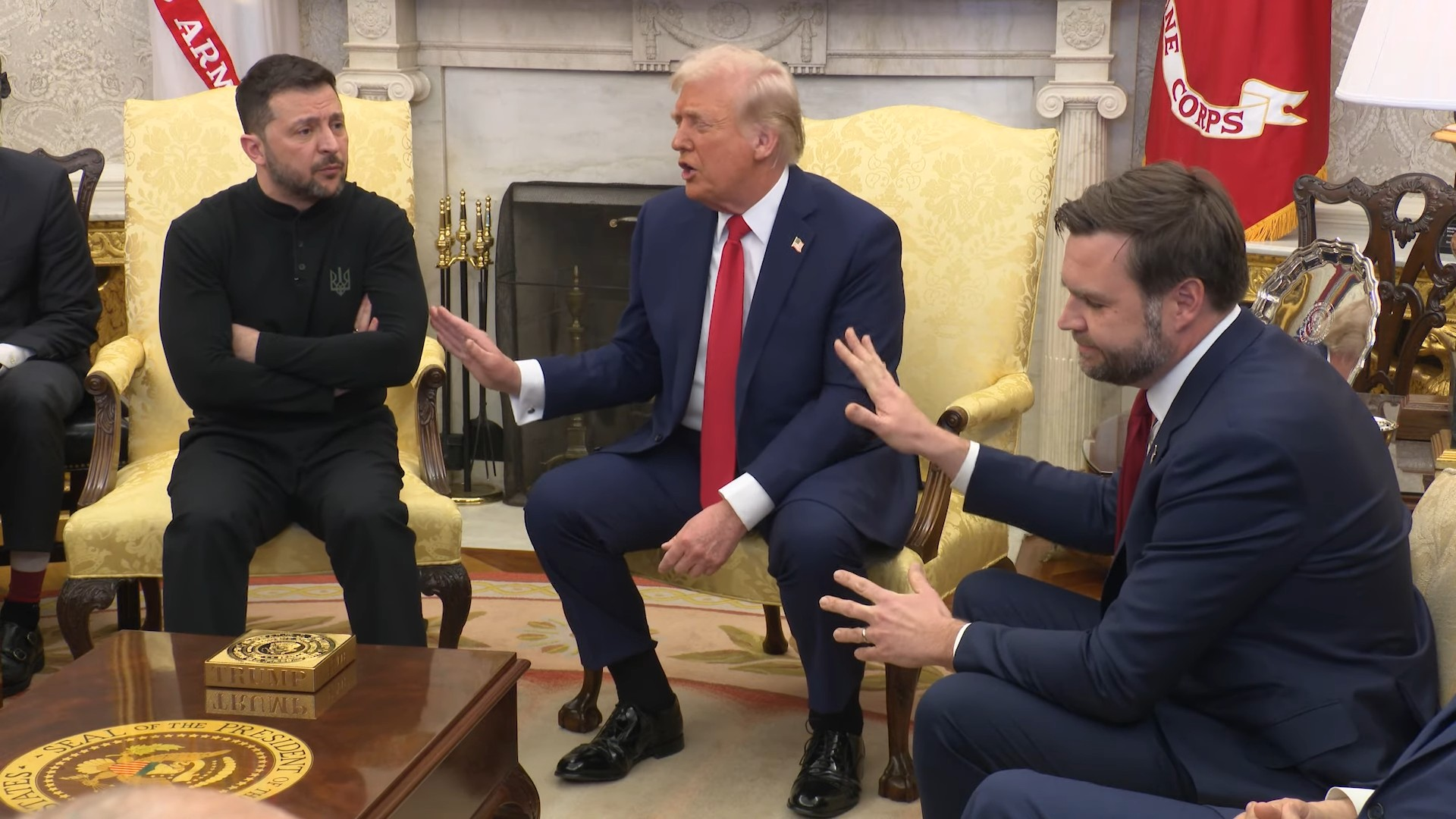
President Trump and Vice President JD Vance clash with Ukrainian President Zelenskyy during a 2025 meeting in the Oval Office.

On February 28, 2025, US President Donald Trump, the president of the United States, and Ukrainian President Volodymyr Zelenskyy held a highly contentious, bilateral meeting televised live in the Oval Office at the White House in Washington, D.C. The meeting was to discuss continued U.S. support for Ukraine in repelling the ongoing Russian invasion of the country, and was expected to conclude with the signing of the Ukraine–United States Mineral Resources Agreement; but the meeting ended abruptly without a clear resolution. During the meeting, Trump and JD Vance, the vice president of the United States, repeatedly criticized Zelenskyy, at times drowning out his voice. The incident marked the first time in U.S. history that a sitting president openly verbally attacked a visiting head of state.

Leading up to the meeting, there were tensions between the Trump administration and Zelenskyy's government. Trump wanted Ukraine to make concessions to Russia to swiftly end the war. He had begun talks with Russia without involving Ukraine, implied Zelenskyy was to blame for the Russian invasion, and called Zelenskyy a "dictator" for not holding elections during the war, something that was not legally possible due to martial law. Zelenskyy wanted strong security guarantees against future Russian aggression. He believed that without these, Russia's president Vladimir Putin would break any agreement, as he had before.

The meeting was widely criticized for its fiery, confrontational, and antagonistic tone. Nearly all U.S. allies, along with other global figures, swiftly voiced their support for Zelenskyy following the confrontation, with many issuing statements that appeared to rebuke Trump's confrontational approach. In contrast, Russian officials praised the outcome of the meeting and directed criticism toward Zelenskyy while Russian media expressed shock. In the U.S., reactions were divided along partisan lines – members of Trump's party, the Republican Party, largely commended his conduct, with few exceptions, while members of the Democratic Party widely condemned it. Within a week of the meeting, the Trump administration suspended provision of intelligence and all military aid to Ukraine. On March 5, CIA director John Ratcliffe said that there was a "pause" on both "the military front and the intelligence front", while national security adviser Mike Waltz answered a media query regarding intelligence provision that the United States was "pausing, assessing, looking at everything across our security relationship". On March 8, the National Geospatial-Intelligence Agency under the Trump administration said that, in relation to "support to Ukraine", the agency has "suspended access to U.S. government-purchased commercial imagery", while satellite imagery company Maxar Technologies suspended Ukrainian access per the Trump administration's decision.

=== Gaza War (2023–present) ===
Following the October 7 attacks, the United States gave strong support for Israel as they prepared to launch an invasion of the Gaza Strip. This led to a proxy war between Iran and the United States, with Iran backing several organizations to launch attacks against the United States. Between October 2023 – December 2024, the United States was attacked 223 times by the Islamic Revolutionary Guard Corps, a branch of the Iranian military, the Houthi movement in Yemen, the Islamic Resistance in Iraq and various other Iranian proxies across Iraq, Jordan, and Syria, including the Popular Mobilization Forces. During the proxy war, the United States launched numerous retaliatory strikes against the Iranian-supported "Axis of Resistance" informal alliance.

=== China–United States relations ===
==== Trump transition and first presidency (2016–2021) ====
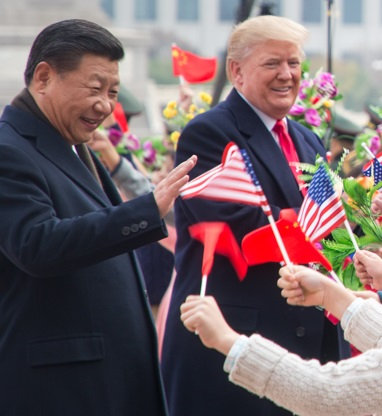
Xi Jinping and Donald Trump in 2017

In 2016, China surpassed the United States as the world's largest economy by purchasing power parity (PPP). (Note: The United States is still the world's largest economy nominally since the U.S. dollar is more valuable than the Chinese yuan.) The first presidency of Donald Trump led to a negative shift in US relations with China. President-elect Trump's telephone conversation with the president of Taiwan Tsai Ing-wen on December 2, 2016, was the first such contact with Taiwan by an American president-elect or president since 1979. It provoked Beijing to lodge a diplomatic protest ("stern representations"). Trump went on to clarify his move: "I fully understand the 'one China' policy, but I don't know why we have to be bound by a 'one China' policy unless we make a deal with China having to do with other things, including trade."

Trump repeatedly said during his presidential campaign that he considered China a threat, a stance that heightened speculation at the time of the possibility of a "new cold war with China". Claremont McKenna College professor Minxin Pei said Trump's election win and "ascent to the presidency" may increase chances of the possibility. In March 2017, a self-declared socialist magazine Monthly Review said, "With the rise of the Trump administration, the new Cold War with Russia has been put on hold", and also said that the Trump administration has planned to shift from Russia to China as its main competitor.

External videos
- "Vice President Mike Pence's Remarks on the Administration's Policy Towards China"

In July 2018, Michael Collins, deputy assistant director of the CIA's East Asia mission center, told the Aspen Security Forum in Colorado that he believed China under paramount leader and general secretary Xi Jinping, while unwilling to go to war, was waging a "quiet kind of cold war" against the United States, seeking to replace the US as the leading global power. He further elaborated: "What they're waging against us is fundamentally a cold war — a cold war not like we saw during [the] Cold War (between the U.S. and the Soviet Union) but a cold war by definition". In October 2018, Hong Kong's Lingnan University professor Zhang Baohui told The New York Times that a speech by United States Vice-president Mike Pence at the Hudson Institute "will look like the declaration of a new Cold War".

In January 2019, Robert D. Kaplan of the Center for a New American Security wrote that "it is nothing less than a new cold war: The constant, interminable Chinese computer hacks of American warships' maintenance records, Pentagon personnel records, and so forth constitute war by other means. This situation will last decades and will only get worse".

In February 2019, Joshua Shifrinson, an associate professor from Boston University, said concerns over a new cold war was "overblown", saying US-China relations were different from that of US–Soviet Union relations during the original Cold War, and that ideology would play a less prominent role in their bilateral relationship.

In June 2019, academic Stephen Wertheim called President Trump a "xenophobe" and criticised Trump's foreign policy toward China for heightening risks of a new Cold War, which Wertheim wrote "could plunge the United States back into gruesome proxy wars around the world and risk a still deadlier war among the great powers."

In August 2019, Yuan Peng of the China Institute of International Studies said that the 2008 financial crisis "initiated a shift in the global order." Yuan predicted the possibility of the new cold war between both countries and their global power competition turning "from 'superpower vs. major power' to 'No. 1 vs. No. 2'." On the other hand, scholar Zhu Feng said that their "strategic competition" would not lead to the new Cold War. Zhu said that the US–China relations have progressed positively and remained "stable", despite disputes in the South China Sea and Taiwan Strait and US President Trump's aggressive approaches toward China.

In January 2020, columnist and historian Niall Ferguson opined that China is one of the major players of this Cold War, whose powers are "economic rather than military", and that Russia's role is "quite small". Ferguson wrote: "[C]ompared with the 1950s, the roles have been reversed. China is now the giant, Russia the mean little sidekick. China under Xi remains strikingly faithful to the doctrine of Marx and Lenin. Russia under Putin has reverted to Tsarism." Ferguson wrote that this Cold War is different from the original Cold War because the US "is so intertwined with China" at the point where "decoupling" is as others argued "a delusion" and because "America's traditional allies are much less eager to align themselves with Washington and against Beijing." He further wrote that the new Cold War "shifted away from trade to technology" when both the US and China signed their Phase One trade deal.

In a February 2020 interview with The Japan Times, Ferguson suggested that, to "contain China", the US "work intelligently with its Asian and European allies", as the US had done in the original Cold War, rather than on its own and perform something more effective than "tariffs, which are a very blunt instrument." He also said that the US under Trump has been "rather poor" at making foreign relations.

On May 24, 2020, China Foreign Minister Wang Yi said that relations with the US were on the "brink of a new Cold War" after it was fueled by tensions over the COVID-19 pandemic.

In June 2020, Boston College political scientist Robert S. Ross wrote that the US and China "are destined to compete [but] not destined for violent conflict or a cold war." In July, Ross said that the Trump "administration would like to fully decouple from China. No trade, no cultural exchanges, no political exchanges, no cooperation on anything that resembles common interests."

In August 2020, a La Trobe University professor Nick Bisley wrote that the US–China rivalry "will be no Cold War" but rather will "be more complex, harder to manage, and last much longer." He further wrote that comparing the old Cold War to the ongoing rivalry "is a risky endeavour."

In September 2020, the UN Secretary General António Guterres warned that the increasing tensions between the US under Trump and China under Xi were leading to "a Great Fracture" which would become costly to the world. Xi Jinping replied by saying that "China has no intention to fight either a Cold War or a hot one with any country."

==== Biden presidency (2021–2025) ====
In March 2021, Columbia University professor Thomas J. Christensen wrote that the cold war between the US and China "is unlikely" in comparison to the original Cold War, citing China's prominence in the "global production chain" and absence of the authoritarianism vs. liberal democracy dynamic. Christensen further advised those concerned about the tensions between the two nations to research China's role in the global economy and its "foreign policy toward international conflicts and civil wars" between liberal and authoritarian forces.

In September 2021, former Portuguese defence and foreign minister Paulo Portas described the announcement of the AUKUS security pact and the ensuing unprecedented diplomatic crisis between the signatories (Australia, the United Kingdom, and the United States) and France (which has several territories in the Indo-Pacific) as a possible formal starting point of a new Cold War.

On November 7, 2021, President Joe Biden's national security adviser Jake Sullivan stated that the US does not pursue system change in China anymore, marking a clear break from the China policy pursued by previous US administrations. Sullivan said that the US is not seeking a new Cold War with China, but is looking for a system of peaceful coexistence.

In November 2021, Hal Brands and Yale professor John Lewis Gaddis wrote in Foreign Affairs that while it was no longer debatable that the United States and China has been entering into their "own new cold war," it was not clear that the world has also been following suit and entering into a new cold war.

According to a poll done by Morning Consult, only 15 percent of US respondents and 16 percent of Chinese respondents think the countries are in a cold war, with most rather categorizing it as a competition.

In August 2022, the Chinese Ministry of Foreign Affairs released a statement condemning US House speaker Nancy Pelosi's visit to Taiwan. This statement demanded, among other things, that the US "not seek a 'new Cold War'".

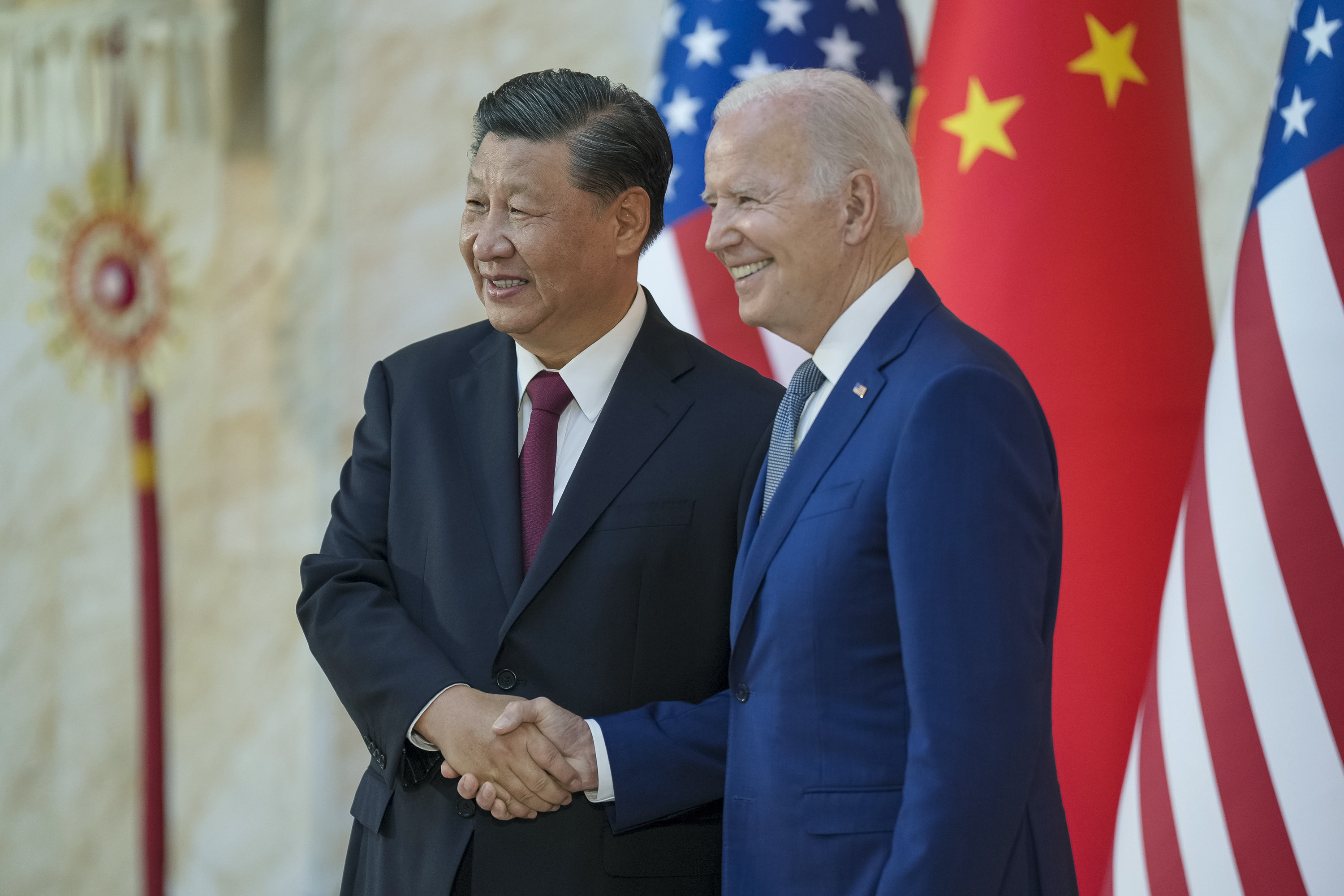
Joe Biden and Xi Jinping at the G20 Summit in Bali, 2022

Following a November 2022 meeting between Biden and Xi Jinping at the G20 summit in Bali, Biden told reporters that "there need not be a new Cold War".

In a December 2022 editorial published just before being elected US House speaker, Kevin McCarthy wrote that "China and the US are locked in a cold war." The op-ed also announced the creation of the House Select Committee on Strategic Competition between the United States and the Chinese Communist Party.

In early 2023, Jorge Heine, former Chilean ambassador to China and professor of international relations at Boston University, said the looming new Cold War between the US and China has become apparent to "a growing consensus", and described the new Cold War as "more alike than [it is] different" from the one fought between the US and Soviet Union, and saying the presence of "ideological-military overtones is now widely accepted."

==== Second Trump presidency (2025–present) ====
In early May 2022, Hoover Institution senior fellow Niall Ferguson said at the Milken Institute Global Conference that "Cold War II began some time ago". In January 2025, Ferguson wrote that the US has had "a second cold war" with China for at least six years and that the war further intensified under the Biden administration. Ferguson drew comparisons between Trump and then-US President Ronald Reagan, like assassination attempts on them, but further suggested that Trump use the Reagan administration's past approach in foreign policy.

In early February 2025, Michael McFaul, a Stanford University political science professor and former US ambassador to Russia from 2012 to 2014, wrote via The Dispatch that Trump still viewed China as a major rival during his second term. McFaul criticised the second Trump administration for risking its chances to win "Cold War 2.0". He further criticised the administration's foreign policy decisions—for example, calling Canada a potential 51st state candidate, announcing attempts to pressure NATO ally Denmark to give up Greenland, and attempts to shut down United States Agency for International Development (USAID)—for giving China and its ally Russia more advantage and risking ties with longtime US allies. McFaul further wrote, "We will not be able to win Cold War 2.0 on our own." In 2025–26, the U.S. triggered the Greenland crisis.

=== Relations between the United States and Latin America ===
==== Venezuela ====
The United States and Venezuela had a negative relation from the presidency of Nicolás Maduro. The US declined to recognize President Maduro in January 2019 and tried to get him to leave office through diplomacy, economic and legal means.

During the second Trump administration warships were sent off the coast of Venezuela to what the United States said was part of an anti-drug effort. From September 2025 until the beginning of 2026, 35 boats were struck by US military forces and 115 were killed. The Trump administration bombed Caracas and captured Maduro and his wife, Cilia Flores, on January 3, 2026, booking the two under drug-trafficking charges. They pled not guilty.

=== 2026 Iran War ===
The United States along with Israel launched a series of air strikes on Iran starting on February 28 where Ayatollah Ali Khamenei was killed. Iran retaliated by attacking Israel, US facilities and allies to the United States across the Middle East afterward. A two-week ceasefire was agreed to between the United States and Iran on April 8 which was extended indefinitely before later ending in July.

== COVID-19 pandemic ==
Weekly confirmed COVID-19 deaths

On January 21, 2020, the first case of COVID-19 was detected in Everett, Washington, and the first death occurring on February 6. By February 2, the Trump administration restricted travel to and from China. On March 11, the WHO declared the virus to be a pandemic. In March, many state and local governments imposed "stay at home" orders to slow the spread of the virus, with the goal of reducing patient overload in hospitals. By March 26, New York Times data showed the United States to have the highest number of known cases of any country. By March 27, the country had reported over 100,000 cases. On April 2, at President Trump's direction, the Centers for Medicare & Medicaid Services (CMS) and CDC ordered additional preventive guidelines to the long-term care facility industry. On April 11, the U.S. death toll became the highest in the world when the number of deaths reached 20,000, surpassing that of Italy. On April 19, the CMS added new regulations requiring nursing homes to inform residents, their families and representatives, of COVID-19 cases in their facilities. On April 28, the total number of confirmed cases across the country surpassed 1 million. By May 2020, 100,000 Americans had died with COVID-19. This corresponded with a relaxing of lockdown restrictions, leading to a surge of cases in July.

National, state, and local elections were impacted as a result of the pandemic. Many primary elections scheduled in March and April were postponed and sometimes cancelled. Voting by mail was also widely used as an alternative, with restrictions initially being relaxed to support the influx of mail voters. Campaign events were also altered, with Democratic candidate Joe Biden suspending many in-person rallies. President Trump continued with in-person rallies, receiving widespread criticism. An outbreak at the White House resulted in at least 48 people testing positive including President Trump and First Lady Melania Trump. This resulted in the cancellation of a scheduled presidential debate between Trump and Biden.

COVID-19 vaccines began to be developed quickly after the pandemic began. In December, the FDA granted emergency use authorization for the Pfizer-BioNTech vaccine and the Moderna vaccine, followed shortly after by the Janssen COVID-19 vaccine. Booster doses were later approved for all 3 vaccines to improve immunity over time. Many companies, universities, and state governments began giving bonuses and rewards in mid-2021 to encourage higher vaccine rates. Localities such as New York City, private companies such as United Airlines, and organizations such as the US Army issued vaccine mandates. This was accompanied by an executive order by Biden to enforce a vaccine requirement for large companies, although this was later blocked by the Supreme Court.

From June 2021 to March 2022, United States had greatly suffered from the highly transmissible Delta cron hybrid variant that is combined with Delta and Omicron variant, also known as the recombination event, for example: COVID-19 Delta variant caused a surge in COVID-19 cases, hospitalizations, and deaths, especially among all of those who are unvaccinated or fully vaccinated. By August of the same year, Delta variant accounted for 99% of all cases of COVID-19, with the country surpassing 35 million cases. On December 1, 2021, COVID-19 Omicron Variant has arrived in the United States. However, as of January 2022 as the country became widespread, the United States has now causing a massive increase in cases, hospitalizations, and deaths, averaging over 1 million new cases daily.

By February and March 2022, all 50 states and many localities began to lift restrictions and mask mandates. In his 2022 State of the Union Address, President Biden announced a new national strategy against the pandemic, including an increased emphasis on antiviral pills and combating new variants. On April 18, 2022, the federal transportation mask mandate, which had been extended to May 3 by the Biden administration on the advice of the CDC, was ended nationwide by U.S. District Judge Kathryn Kimball Mizelle, a Trump-appointed federal judge in Florida. As of May 13, 2022, United States has surpassed 1 million COVID-19-related deaths, which becoming the deadliest pandemic in American and our nations' history since two World Wars and Spanish flu pandemic in 1918 and 1920.

Cases and deaths decreased throughout 2022, leading to President Biden stating his belief in a September interview that the COVID-19 pandemic was "over" in the United States, a statement, which received backlash from many in the medical community.

On May 11, 2023, just six days after the W.H.O. ended its designation of the three-year period of the global COVID-19 emergency of international concern, which estimated report 20 million excess deaths, U.S. federal government ends COVID-19 state of emergency, which remains a public health priority.

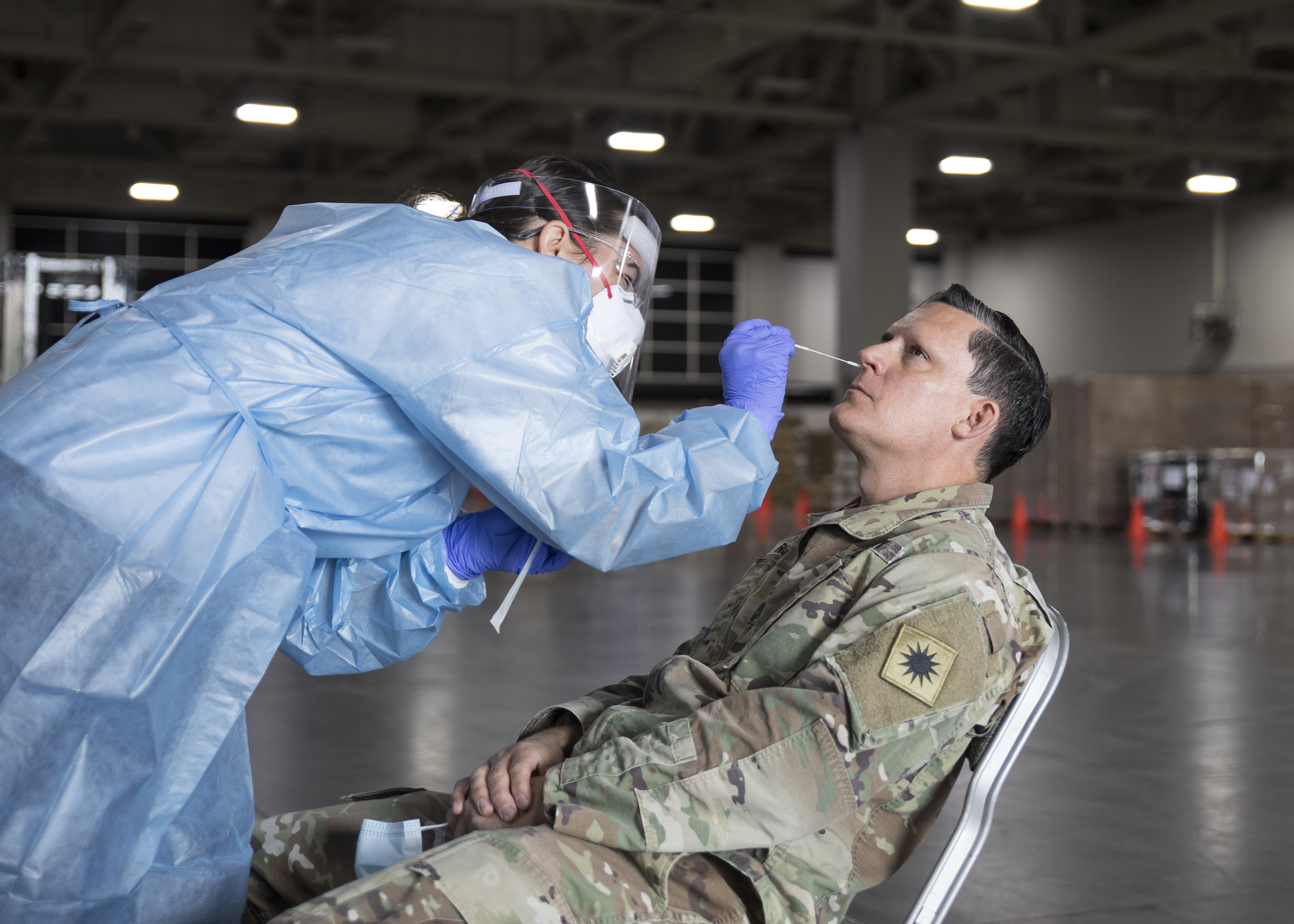
A medical technician assigned to the 151st Medical Group conducts a COVID-19 test on a member of the Utah National Guard at a supply warehouse, May 14, 2020.

=== Impact on economy and society ===
The impact of the pandemic was widespread across social and economic sectors. COVID-19 lockdowns contributed to mass changes in social behavior for Americans. COVID-19 also had immediate consequences for prison populations, public transport, and cultural events such as sports. School closures also contributed to a learning gap for students as well as a rise in mental health concerns. Nearly all schools and universities transitioned to a completely online or hybrid method of teaching in spring 2020. Racial disparities were also exasperated by the pandemic, with a disproportionate number of cases being observed amongst Black and Latino populations. These groups were also more likely to die from COVID-19 and less likely to have received a vaccine. Native American reservations were also hit particularly hard, with lack of access to vaccines contributing to higher cases. Anti-Asian racism and xenophobia was also widely reported due to perceived Chinese faulthood for the virus. The economy entered a recession following an initial stock market crash in February 2020. National unemployment rose to a high of 14.7% in April 2020. Long lasting economic effects continued throughout the early 2020s resulting in supply-chain issues and a period of inflation.

== Democratic backsliding ==
The V-Dem Institute said in 2026 regarding Trump's presidency that "the speed with which American democracy is currently dismantled is unprecedented in modern history". The institute noted executive overreach undermining the rule of law, suppression and intimidation of media and dissenting voices, loss of legislative constraints, and declining civil rights, equality, and freedom of expression.

Beginning in October 2025, The New York Times editorial board published an Autocracy Index showing erosion of US democracy using various benchmarks, offering "a way to understand how much Mr. Trump is eroding American democracy" since his January 2025 inauguration.

During the 2020s, scholars and historians identified significant democratic backsliding in the United States. The V-Dem Democracy Indices's electoral democracy index score for the United States peaked in 2015 and declined sharply after 2016, for which year it was also downgraded to "flawed democracy" by the Economist Intelligence Unit in its annual Democracy Index report. Both V-Dem and Freedom House downgraded the United States in 2018. According to James Grumbach, beyond the national level, democratic backsliding has occurred in American states under unified Republican Party control while Democratic Party-controlled and divided states have become more democratic. Grumbach also states "policies are more varied across the states as red and blue party coalitions implement increasingly distinct agendas." This backsliding has been accompanied by legislation restricting the civil rights of gender and sexual minorities, abortion rights, and voting rights.

In the V-Dem Institute's democracy report published in 2026, which describes the year 2025, the U.S. was classified as an "electoral democracy" for the first time in over 50 years, losing its status as a liberal democracy.

== Disasters ==
In August 2017, Hurricane Harvey became the first major hurricane to make landfall in the United States since Hurricane Wilma in 2005. It devastated Houston, Texas, causing extreme flooding, 83 confirmed deaths, and an estimated $70 billion to $200 billion in damage. Harvey's highest winds hit 130 mph.

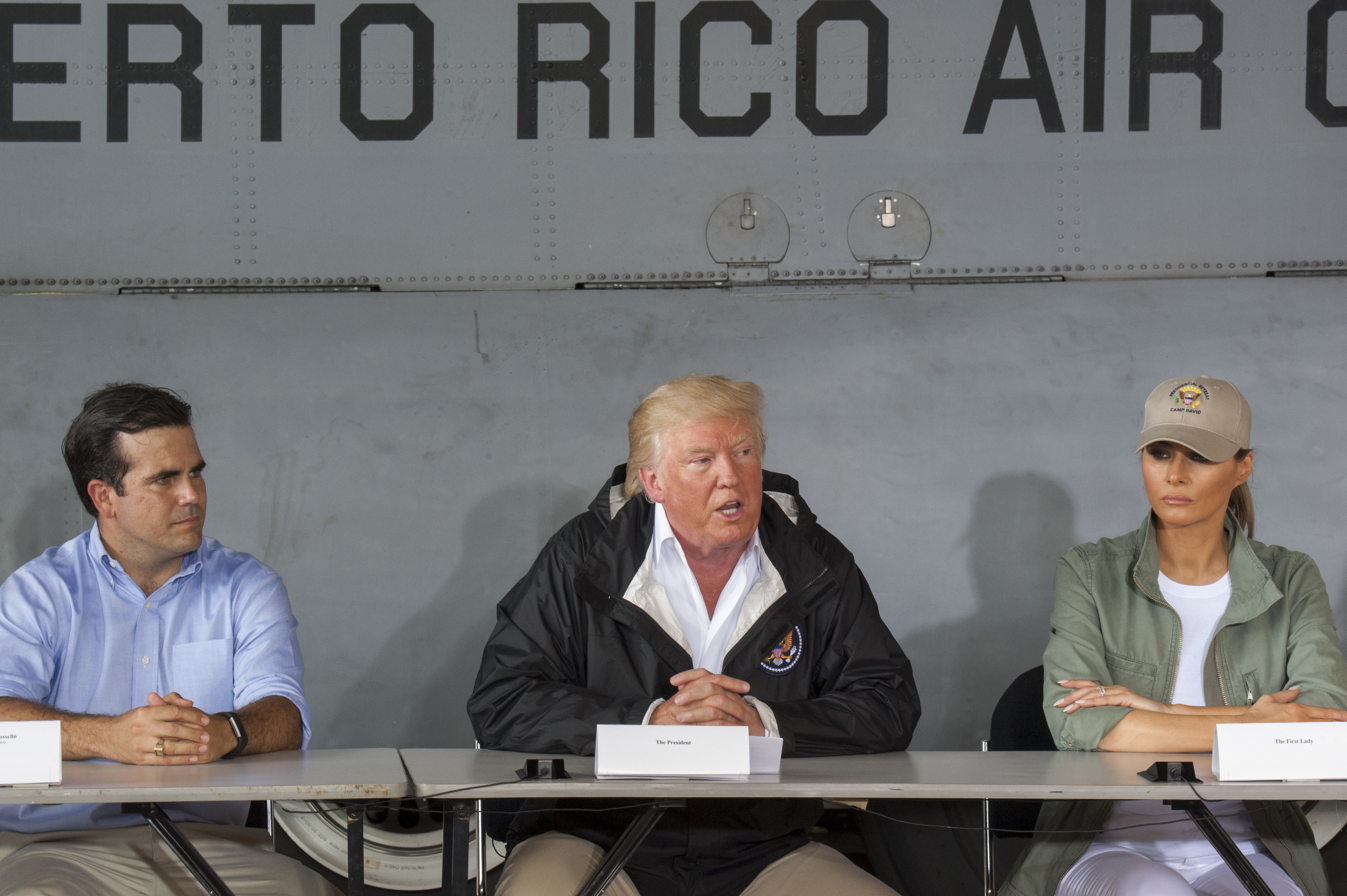
President Donald Trump speaks in Puerto Rico after Hurricane Maria in October 2017.

In September, Hurricane Irma hit Florida, killing 102 people and causing over $62.87 billion in damage, making it unofficially the fourth-costliest hurricane on record. The size of the storm spanned across the entire Florida peninsula, and all 67 counties of Florida declared a state of emergency. Irma's highest winds were 185 mph. Later that month, Hurricane Maria hit Puerto Rico, a US territory, killing over 547 people and causing over $91.6 billion in damage, making it the third-costliest Atlantic hurricane on record. Maria's highest winds were 175 mph.

On September 14, 2018, Hurricane Florence hit North Carolina as a Category 1 Hurricane, causing major flooding. 39 deaths were counted and damage is estimated as $17 billion (2018 USD). Florence's highest winds were 140 mph. On October 10, Hurricane Michael struck the Florida Panhandle as a Category 5 storm with 160 mph winds after undergoing rapid intensification just prior to landfall; it killed 45 people in the US and caused $15 billion in damage.

In November of that year, several wildfires devastated portions of California, most notably the Camp Fire in Butte County in Northern California, which burned over 150,000 acres and destroyed nearly 19,000 structures. With a death toll of 86 and damages up to $10 billion, it was the deadliest and most destructive wildfire in California history and the deadliest US wildfire since 1918.

A series of earthquakes struck Southern California on July 4 and 5, 2019. A magnitude 6.4 earthquake, a foreshock, struck near the desert city of Ridgecrest, on July 4. On July 5, a 7.1 earthquake struck, the main shock, centered near the first. The latter was the largest earthquake to hit Southern California in 20 years. Relatively minor damage resulted from the initial foreshock, though some building fires were reported in Ridgecrest near the epicenter. Effects were felt across much of Southern California as well as parts of Arizona and Nevada, as far north as the San Francisco Bay Area and Sacramento, and as far south as Baja California, Mexico. An estimated 20 million people experienced the foreshock, and approximately 30 million people experienced the mainshock.

In September 2022, Hurricane Ian struck Florida, causing $112 billion in damage, making Ian the third costliest weather disaster on record worldwide. Ian caused 161 deaths, making it the deadliest hurricane to strike the state of Florida since the 1935 Labor Day hurricane, and the strongest hurricane to make landfall in Florida since Michael in 2018. The cities of Fort Myers, Cape Coral, and Naples were particularly hit hard, leaving millions without power in the storm's wake and numerous inhabitants forced to take refuge on their roofs. Sanibel Island, Fort Myers Beach, and Pine Island bore the brunt of Ian's powerful winds and its accompanying storm surge at landfall, which leveled thousands of standing structures in the region and collapsed the Sanibel Causeway and the Pine Island Causeway to Pine Island, entrapping those left on the islands for several days. The destruction led to the United States Congress holding a televised investigative hearing regarding the federal government's response to and overall recovery efforts from Ian. The hearing discovered numerous issues with how the Federal Emergency Management Agency (FEMA) responded to the aftermath of Ian.

In early August 2023, a series of wildfires broke out in the U.S. state of Hawaii, predominantly on the island of Maui. The wind-driven fires prompted evacuations, caused $5.5 billion in damages, killing at least 100 people and leaving at least 31 others missing in the town of Lahaina, Hawaii.

On March 26, 2024, the Francis Scott Key Bridge in Baltimore, Maryland collapsed after colliding with the container ship Dali. The bridge collapse resulted in the deaths of 6 people, as well as the closure of the Port of Baltimore, which sees significant automobile imports and coal exports. The collapse is estimated to cost $1.7 billion in supply chain disruptions.

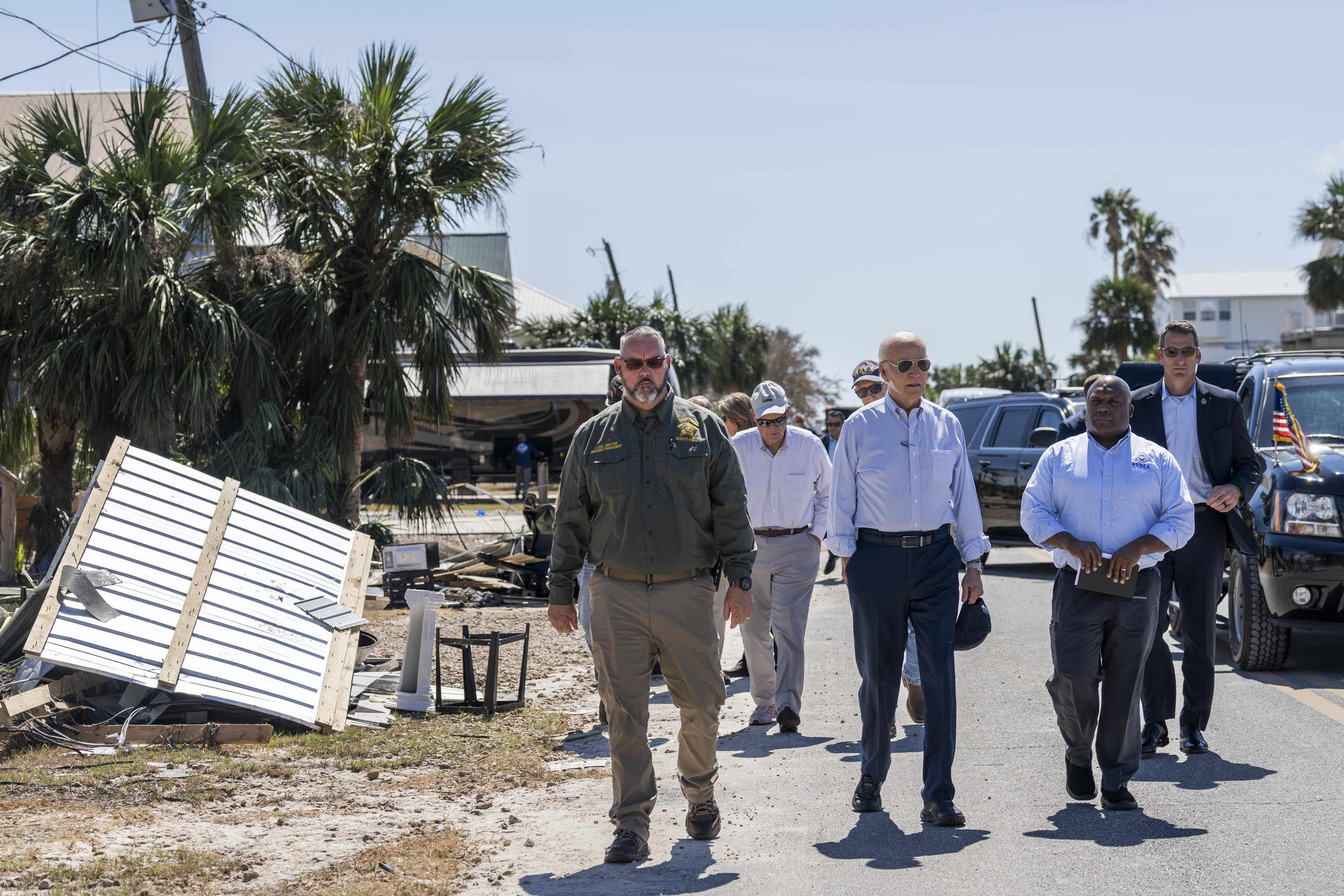
President Joe Biden surveys damage from Hurricane Helene in October 2024.

In September and October 2024, Hurricanes Helene and Milton hit the Southeastern United States, killing 297 people and causing a combined damage total of $113.1 billion. Helene caused devastating damage in Florida and over $7 billion in damage to Georgia before causing extreme flooding across North Carolina, the hardest impacted state by Helene. Milton became the most intense Atlantic hurricane ever recorded over the Gulf of Mexico, with one-minute sustained winds of 180 mph (285 km/h), a measured wind gust of approximatelly 200 miles per hour (320 km/h), and a pressure of 895 millibars (26.43 inHg), making it the fourth-most intense Atlantic hurricane on record, tying the pressure record in the Gulf of Mexico with Hurricane Rita of 2005. After weaking to Category 3 strength, Milton struck Florida causing major devastation as well as a historic tornado outbreak. Between November 2024 – March 2025, the United States Congress held four televised investigative hearings on the federal government's response to, overall recovery efforts from, and criminal events following Helene and Milton. These hearings heavily focused on actions done by the Federal Emergency Management Agency (FEMA), including failures in FEMA's response as well as political discrimination and criminal actions by FEMA employees.

A series of destructive wildfires began in the Greater Los Angeles area in early January 2025, including the Palisades, Eaton, and Hughes fires. Exacerbated by drought conditions and the high-speed Santa Ana winds, they collectively burned over 50,000 acres of land and damaged more than 17,000 structures, resulting in at least 28 deaths and the evacuations of 200,000 people.

In early July 2025, significant rainfall led to flooding in Central Texas. Over 135 deaths occurred, with most of the casualties occurring in Kerr County, including multiple youth campers at a summer camp. The flooding demonstrated extreme challenges in early warning systems regarding floods.

== Growing economic inequality ==
Observers have called this era of history the Second Gilded Age due to an increase in wealth inequality after deregulation stemming from the Reagan era, inequality which only grew during the Great Recession. The Gilded Age was a time of rampant political corruption, and many authors have compared it to the corruption of the modern day. "Bailout billionaires" have been accused of purchasing politicians, using dark money and super PACs as vehicles for buying elections. According to Henry Giroux, the United States has entered a Second Gilded Age "more savage and anti-democratic than its predecessor" as a result of the implementation of neoliberalism and contemporary market fundamentalism.

Many authors draw comparisons between the obscene fortunes of Gilded Age figures such as William Randolph Hearst and Second Gilded Age figures such as Elon Musk, both men who took control of media empires to push political agendas. Where Hearst took control of newspapers, Musk took control of the platform formerly known as Twitter. Hearst and Musk have both been criticized for using their newly acquired empires to spread misinformation and antisemitism.

According to The New Hampshire Gazette, the response from more radical elements of the general public to the excesses of the First Gilded Age are similar to what is emerging in the Second Gilded Age with the Killing of Brian Thompson, in particular the anarchist tradition of propaganda of the deed.

In his farewell address, U.S. President Joe Biden warned that an emerging American oligarchy and tech–industrial complex posed risks to America in what Politico described as "echoing Roosevelt's language in calling out the 'robber barons' of a new dystopian Gilded Age". These comments were made in the context of several tech billionaires who made large donations to the 2024 presidential campaign of Donald Trump and his second inauguration. It also came in the context of surging stock prices of "The Magnificent Seven", seven tech companies whose combined value rose 46% in 2024, vastly beating the S&P 500 share index.

== Race ==
The mid-2010s saw the return of racial unrest in the country, as well as the continued growth of racial polarization and a deterioration of race relations in the US. A significant white backlash followed the election of Barack Obama as the first Black US President in 2008. Many observers saw the election of Donald Trump as president in 2016 as an example of white backlash, or "whitelash".

Some authors have pointed out comparisons between the loss of civil rights after the Reconstruction Era and the stripping of civil rights in the modern day. The Supreme Court gutted the Civil Rights Act of 1866 in 1883, just as they gutted the Voting Rights Act of 1965 in 2013, in both cases helping to strip Black Americans of the right to vote. While the legal discrimination of Jim Crow has been overturned, still today, a de facto racist criminal justice system still overlooks or enables police racial discrimination.

Xenophobia continued to gain legal protections in the First Gilded Age, finally culminating in the Chinese Exclusion Act in 1882, fully banning immigration from most of East and South Asia until being overturned during the civil rights era. This approach has been compared with Obama, Trump, and Biden era policies on immigration through the US-Mexico border such as Remain in Mexico. Trump further instituted travel bans from 15 countries, until they were overturned by Biden.

=== Black Lives Matter ===
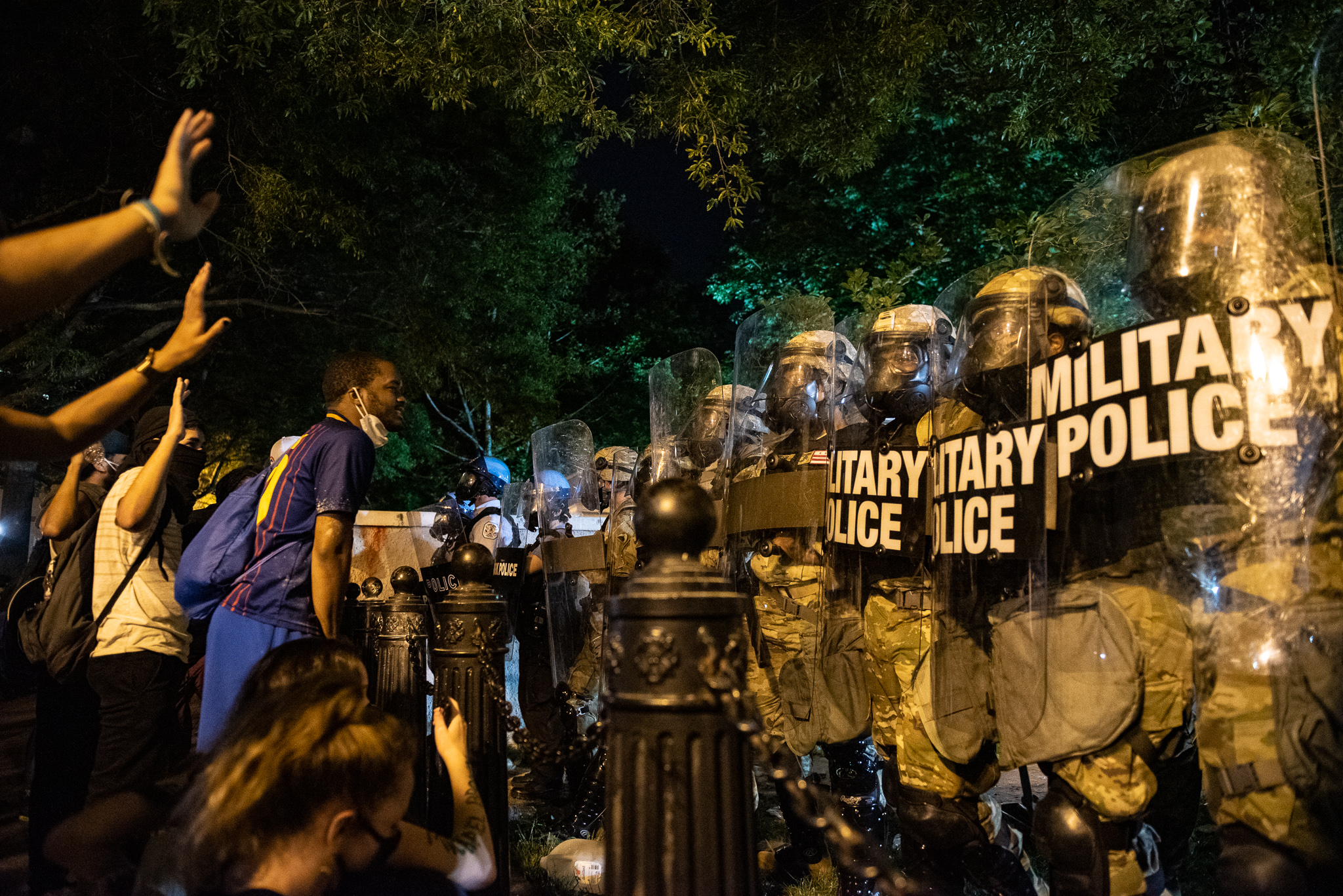
George Floyd protests in Washington DC. H St. Lafayette Square

Anti-racist protests erupted in the wake of the July 5, 2016 shooting of Alton Sterling in Baton Rouge, Louisiana, and the July 6 shooting of Philando Castile in Falcon Heights, Minnesota. On July 7, towards the end of one of these protests in Dallas, Texas, Micah Xavier Johnson ambushed and fired upon a group of police officers, killing five officers and injuring nine others. Two civilians were also wounded. Johnson was an Army Reserve Afghan War veteran who was reportedly angry over police shootings of Black men and stated that he wanted to kill white people, especially white police officers. Following the shooting, Johnson fled inside a building on the campus of El Centro College. Police followed him there, and a standoff ensued. In the early hours of July 8, police killed Johnson with a bomb attached to a remote control bomb disposal robot. It was the first time US law enforcement used a robot to kill a suspect. The shooting was the deadliest incident for US law enforcement officers since the September 11 attacks in 2001 and saw a massive uprising of public support for US police officers in the form of the Blue Lives Matter movement.

The George Floyd protests and riots against police brutality began as local protests in the Minneapolis–Saint Paul metropolitan area of Minnesota before spreading throughout the United States and then worldwide. The protests began in Minneapolis on May 26, 2020, following the murder of George Floyd during an arrest the previous day. Minneapolis Police Department officer Derek Chauvin knelt on Floyd's neck for over nine minutes, asphyxiating him, with the help of three other police. Floyd had been handcuffed and pinned to the ground. Protests quickly spread across the United States and internationally in support of Black Lives Matter. At least twelve major cities declared a curfew on the evening of Saturday, May 30, and as of June 2, governors in 24 states and Washington, D.C. had called in the National Guard, with over 17,000 troops activated.

=== Unite the Right rally ===
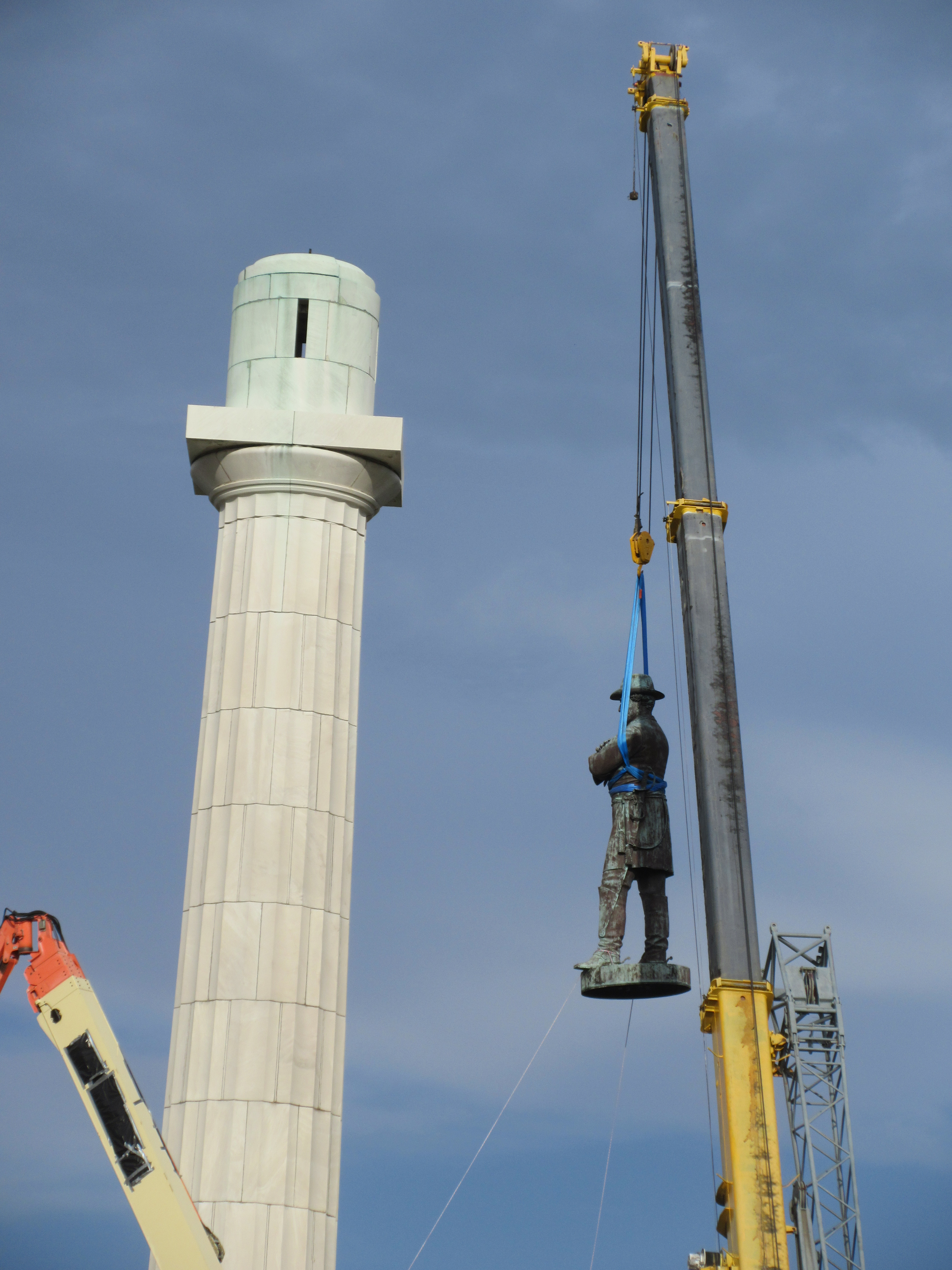
Robert E. Lee monument in New Orleans being lowered as part of a widespread removal of Confederate monuments and memorials, May 19, 2017

On August 13, 2017, Trump condemned violence "on many sides" after a gathering of hundreds of white nationalists in Charlottesville, Virginia, the previous day (August 12) turned deadly. A white supremacist drove a car into a crowd of counter-protesters, killing one woman, Heather Heyer, and injuring 19 others. According to Attorney General Jeff Sessions, that action met the definition of domestic terrorism. During the rally there had been other violence, as some counter-protesters charged at the white nationalists with swinging clubs and mace, throwing bottles, rocks, and paint. Trump did not expressly mention Neo-Nazis, white supremacists, or the alt-right movement in his remarks on August 13, but the following day (August 14) he did denounce white supremacists as he had done as a candidate the previous year. He condemned "the KKK, neo-Nazis, white supremacists, and other hate groups". Then the next day (August 15), he again blamed "both sides".

Many Republican and Democratic elected officials condemned the violence and hatred of white nationalists, neo-Nazis and alt-right activists. Trump came under criticism from world leaders and politicians, as well as a variety of religious groups and anti-hate organizations for his remarks, which were seen as muted and equivocal. The New York Times reported that Trump "was the only national political figure to spread blame for the 'hatred, bigotry and violence' that resulted in the death of one person to 'many sides'", and said that Trump had "buoyed the white nationalist movement on Tuesday as no president has done in generations". White nationalist groups felt "emboldened" after the rally and planned additional demonstrations.

The End Domestic Terrorism rally (sometimes referred to by the slogan "Better dead than red") was a Proud Boys demonstration held in Portland, Oregon, on August 17, 2019. The event received national attention.

== Societal trends ==
=== Demographics ===
In the 2020 United States census the official resident population count of every state in the US including the District of Columbia was 331,449,281. Puerto Rico had a population of 3,285,874 people. For the other island territories of the US the respective populations of each were: American Samoa at 49,710, Guam at 138,836, Northern Mariana Islands at 47,329, US Virgin Islands at 87,146.

Population of the United States 2016–present
Year	Total population
2016 (5-year ACS estimate)	318,558,162
2017 (5-year ACS estimate)	321,004,407
2018 (5-year ACS estimate)	322,903,030
2019 (5-year ACS estimate)	324,697,795
2020 (5-year ACS estimate)	326,569,308
2021 (5-year ACS estimate)	329,725,481
2022 (5-year ACS estimate)	331,097,593
2023 (5-year ACS estimate)	332,387,540
2024 (5-year ACS estimate)	334,922,499

==== Language ====
English was still the most commonly spoken language but the number and percentage of the population that spoke a language apart from English grew from previous decades. President Trump during his second administration would sign an executive order designating English to be the official language of the United States. The usage of emojis was also a popular means of communication.

In 2023 78% percent of people who were 5 and older said they spoke solely English at home with 22% saying they spoke a "Language other than English" with the most common being Spanish. The next languages after Spanish are Mandarin (5.2%), Tagolog (2.6%), Vietnamese (2.3%), and Arabic (1.9%).

=== Religion ===
Religious beliefs in the United States in 2023, according to the Public Religion Research Institute:
1. Christian 66 (65.0%)
2. Unaffiliated 18 (17.7%)
3. Agnostic 5 (4.93%)
4. Atheist 5 (4.93%)
5. Jewish 2 (1.97%)
6. Muslim 1 (0.99%)
7. Hindu 1 (0.99%)
8. Buddhist 1 (0.99%)
9. Unitarian Universalist 0.5 (0.49%)
10. Other religions 2 (1.97%)

The percentage of people unaffiliated with any particular religion grew during this period. The Public Religion Research Institute in 2020 conducted a nationwide poll covering data at the county level reporting that 67% percent were Christian, 18% irreligious (3% were atheist and another 3% agnostic), 1% Muslim, 1% Jewish, 1% Buddhist, 1% being Hindu and 1% belonging to other religions. Another poll conducted in 2023 reported that 66% were Christian, 27% unaffiliated (5% stating they were atheist and the same percentage saying they were agnostic while the rest said nothing in general), 2% Jewish, %1 Muslim, %1 Hindu, %1 Buddhist, 0.5% were Unitarian Universalists and 2% came from other non-Christian faiths.

A November 2022 survey from YouGov reported 51% of respondents as saying religious diversity was a good thing, 28% "Neither good nor bad", 11% said they were not sure and 10% thought it was a bad thing.

=== Science and technology ===
There was a decline in television viewership during this period. A Pew Research Center poll from 2021 reported that in 2015, 76% of American adults received TV via satellite or cable while in 2021 this had declined to 56%. This decline in cable and satellite TV viewership has been attributed to the COVID-19 pandemic and the growth of internet streaming platforms. One medium of information that grew in terms of listenership were podcasts.

==== Computing ====
During this period there was dramatic growth in Artificial Intelligence or AI. There was growth in terms of awareness and how much of the public in the United States interacted with it especially with chatbots. An observable disconnect has been seen between how AI experts and the general public perceive AI with experts perceiving it more positively while the general public perceives it more negatively.

Earthset photographed by Christina Koch of the Artemis II crew during their lunar flyby, April 2026

==== Space exploration ====
The United States began efforts to send humans back to the Moon for the first time since Apollo 17 in 1972 through the Artemis program. The uncrewed Artemis I was launched to lunar orbit in November 2022 and returned to Earth in December 2022. The Artemis II flyby of the Moon in April 2026 was the first crewed mission near the Moon since 1972. It became the furthest human spaceflight and sent the first woman, African American, oldest person, and Canadian, beyond low Earth orbit.

The Ingenuity helicopter probe was launched in 2020 and arrived on Mars in 2021. It made the first powered flight on another celestial body and did 72 flights on Mars until 2024 when its propeller blades were damaged to the point where the probe could not fly anymore.

==== Travel and transportation ====
The 2020 US Census Bureau Community Survey found 91.5% of households had access to at least one car which was a gain from 90.982% in 2015. Electric cars became more common during this period with sales growing.

During the 2010s the number of passengers grew on US airlines on both domestic and international flights consecutively. The COVID-19 pandemic led to a dramatic decline in the number of airline passengers going from its peak during this period of 926.44 million passengers in 2019 to a low of 369.69 million in 2020. In the following years the number of passengers on US airlines began to recover. International travel would end up fully recovering from the downturn in international travel because of the COVID-19 pandemic in 2023 with peak numbers being reached by July of that year. Most Americans visited at least one country in their lives during this period according to a 2023 Pew Research Survey.

Public transportation ridership declined sharply with the start of the COVID-19 Pandemic and has not recovered to pre-pandemic levels. The first private passenger rail line in a century, Brightline opened in Florida in January 2018 going from West Palm Beach to Fort Lauderdale and later expanded to Miami that year in May. The network was later expanded to Orlando in September 2023.

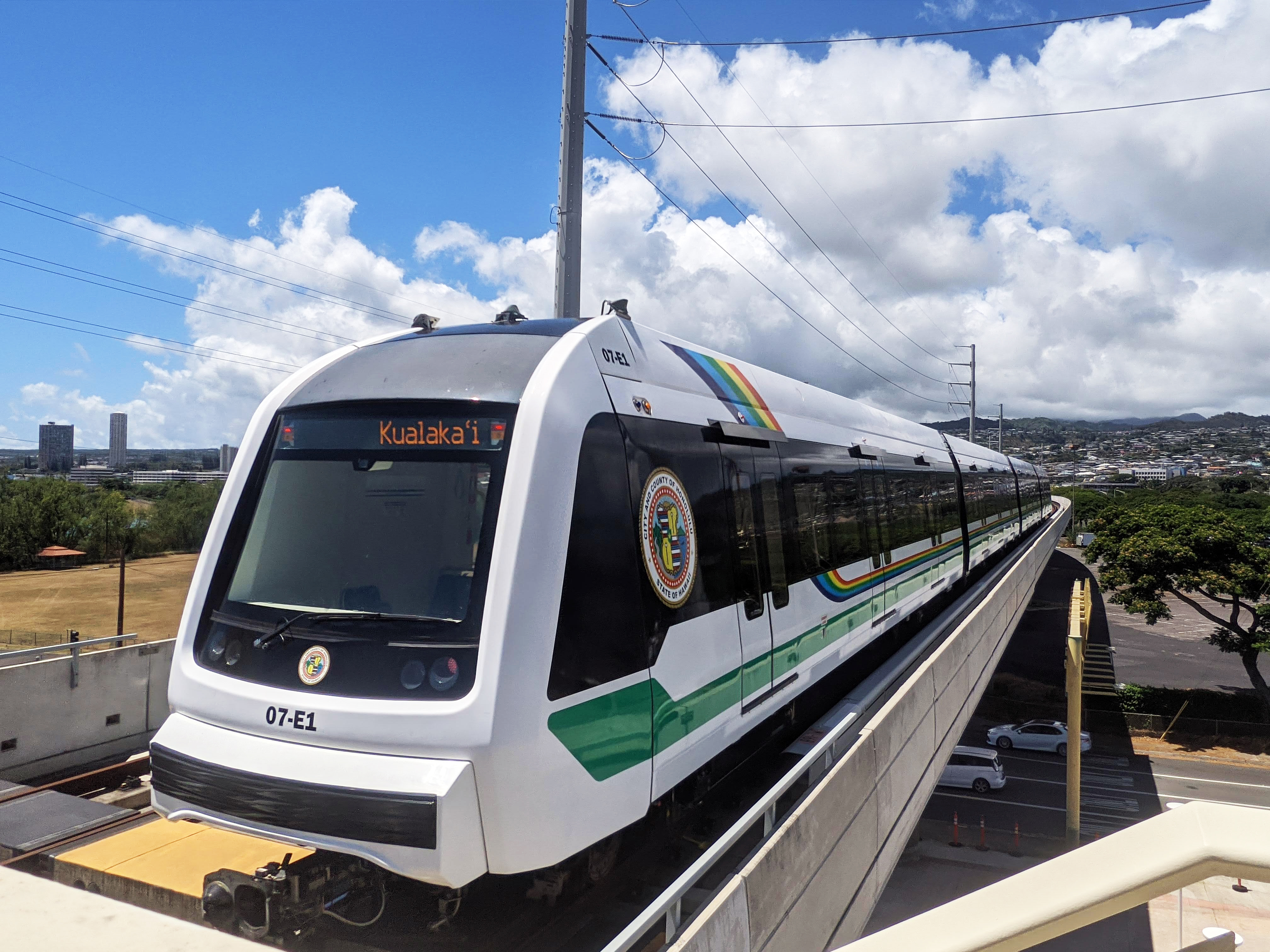
A train for the Honolulu Skyline, a new metro system in the country that began its operation during this period

Honolulu opened the Skyline metro system in 2023, making it the first metro system in Hawaii.

==== Energy ====
During the 2010s and 2020s the United States would see sizeable changes in the country's sources of electricity. Coal as a power source declined in the 2010s going from the top source of electricity to the 4th by 2024. The decline of coal came with the growth of natural gas as a fuel source along with the solar and wind. Solar and wind became the 3rd largest source of electricity for the first time surpassing nuclear in 2023.

The United States also became energy independent for the first time ever since the late 1950s in 2019; meaning that the country produced more energy than it consumed.

=== Family ===
Throughout the 2010s, the national divorce rate continued to decline steadily and the marriage rate initially grew slightly before slightly decreasing during the 2010s; however between 2021 and 2022 the marriage rate did increase. The teen pregnancy rate among those 15–19 fell continuing an overall trend that had been going for many decades prior.

A July 2022 Pew Research Center survey reported that 69% of Americans were in some type of romantic relationship with 51% being married, 11% living with a partner and 8% being in a "committed romantic relationship". 30% were reported as being single and 1% did not give an answer. Online dating was and is popular; the Pew Research Center reported in 2023 that most people (53%) said they had a positive experience with 47% saying they had a negative experience. However harassment from online dating is an issue. A 2024 YouGov survey of adults who were U.S. citizens reported that 11% had been in a polyamorous relationship while 85% had not and 4% said they were not sure.

=== Recreation and leisure ===
Sports along with video games were popular during this period. The number of people who played video games did increase during the COVID-19 Pandemic before it later fell after lockdowns were removed. A ban on states allowing sports betting which was implemented in 1992 was lifted in 2018 by the US Supreme Court.

The youth scouting movement, which was once more prominent in the country, continued its decline during this period in terms of members of the Boy Scouts and Girl Scouts, especially during the pandemic. Boy Scouts of America filed for bankruptcy in 2020 after thousands of former boy scouts sued in court for being abused with a settlement being reached and the organization later leaving bankruptcy. The Boy Scouts of America would later rename themselves to Scouting America in 2025 and the group saw a small growth in the number of members in 2024.

==== Sports ====
Although the United States did not host any Olympic Games in the 2010s and into the mid 2020s, it still participated and came in first place for total medal count in the 2016 Summer Olympics, 2020 Summer Olympics, (Note: The 2020 Summer Olympics were postponed to 2021.) and the 2024 Summer Olympics. The United States is scheduled to host the 2028 Summer Olympics in Los Angeles, and the 2034 Winter Olympics in Salt Lake City. The United States governmental officials boycotted the 2022 Winter Olympics to protest poor treatment of its Uyghur population and "anti-democratic crackdown in Hong Kong", though American athletic teams still participated.

The country hosted the World Games in Birmingham, Alabama in 2022; it was initially scheduled for 2021 but was delayed due to the COVID-19 pandemic.

The 2026 FIFA World Cup was hosted jointly between the United States, Mexico and Canada in different cities throughout the three countries. Cape Verde, Curacao, Jordan and Uzbekistan made their debut appearances at the World Cup that year.

=== Crime and violence ===
Reported crime in the United States (2016–2025)
Year	Violent crime (total)	Property/nonviolent crime (total)	Total
2025	1,044,368	5,133,170	6,177,538
2024	1,202,253	5,846,616	7,048,869
2023	1,235,256	6,270,553	7,505,809
2022	1,266,052	6,359,580	7,625,632
2021	931,599	4,551,120	5,482,719
2020	1,272,597	6,231,850	7,504,447
2019	1,213,775	6,717,891	7,931,666
2018	1,239,076	7,103,920	8,342,996
2017	1,261,786	7,525,626	8,787,412
2016	1,262,062	7,795,949	9,058,011

The crime rate overall in the United States during the 2010s and 2020s continued to decline following a trend which had been occurring since the early 1990s and it was lower compared to previous decades. (Note: In 2015 it was announced a data collection system would be retired and replaced in 2021. In 2021 because of this, the agency participation rate went down that year before going back up again so data should be approached with skepticism. In 2021 62.7% of agencies participated which served 64.8% of the population. The following year 83.3% of agencies participated which served 93.5% of the population.) Violent and nonviolent crime both fell. Yet there was a rise in property crimes particularly car thefts which has been attributed to a trend on TikTok about stealing Kia and Hyundai cars regarding a security vulnerability in them which they responded by doing software upgrades. The number of law enforcement officers increased in the United States every year from 2016 onward with the exception of 2021.

Continuing the increase in high-profile mass school shootings seen in the late 1990s and 2000s, additional school shootings shocked the country in the 2010s and 2020s, the deadliest of which were the Sandy Hook Elementary School shooting (2012), the Parkland high school shooting (2018), and the Uvalde school shooting (2022). These shootings heightened the debate over gun politics and continued the public dialogue about improving mental health care and school safety.

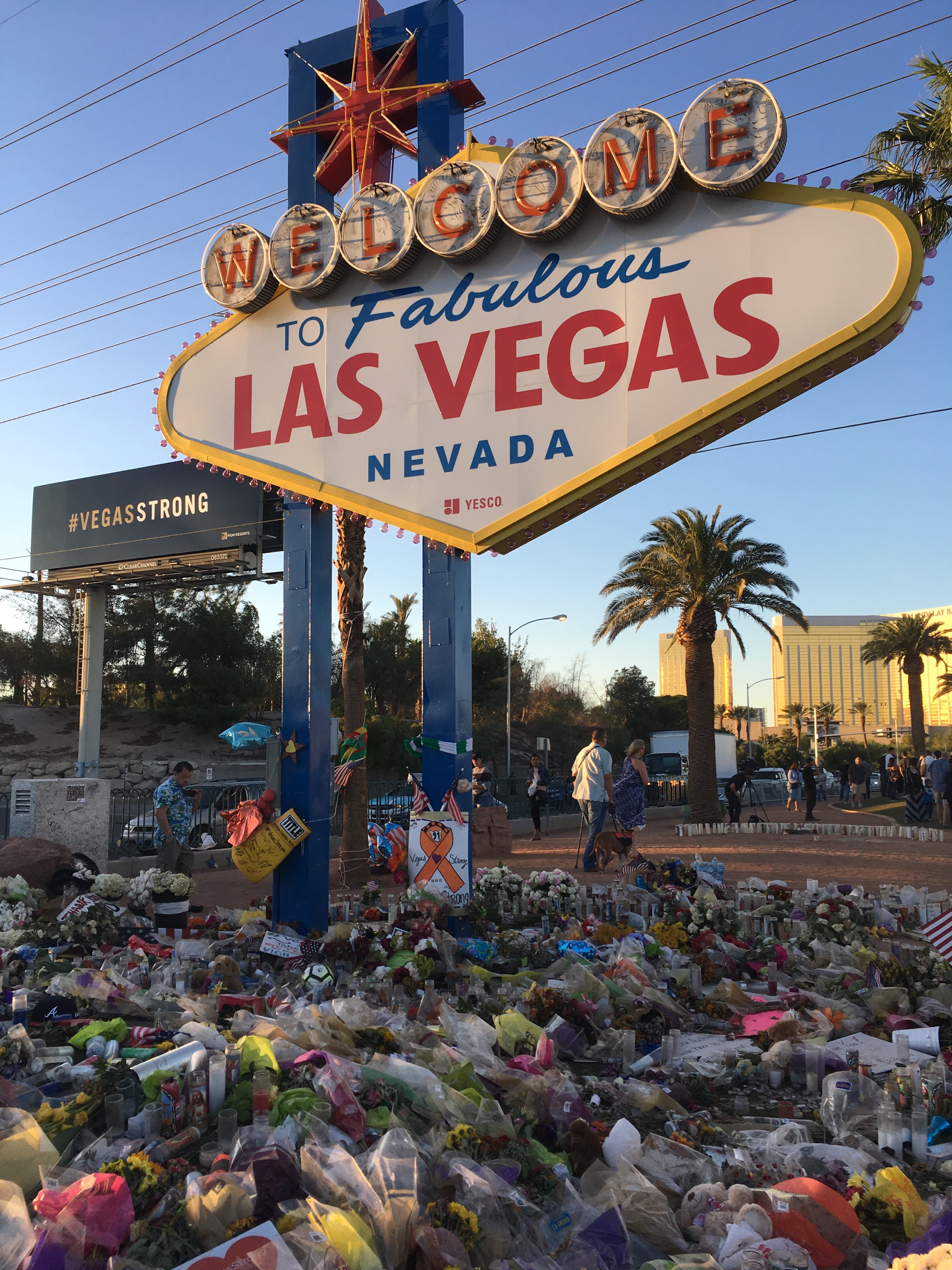
The Las Vegas sign adorned with flowers a week after the deadliest mass shooting in American history took place on the Las Vegas Strip

On June 12, 2016, the Orlando nightclub shooting became the deadliest mass shooting in American history at the time, with 49 people killed at the Pulse nightclub in Orlando, Florida. On October 1, 2017, the Orlando incident was surpassed by the 2017 Las Vegas shooting as the deadliest mass shooting in American history when a gunman fired from his 32nd-floor hotel room of the Mandalay Bay onto a crowd of concertgoers at the Route 91 Harvest music festival, killing 58 and injuring 869 others before committing suicide. This shooting led to increased dialogue and debate over gun control, particularly the use of bump stocks which allowed the shooter to fire his semi-automatic rifle at a rate similar to a fully automatic weapon. Concerns about public event safety and hotel security also became a focus of public dialogue in the wake of this event. In addition, the investigation was the focus of intense scrutiny, particularly as the official reports and timelines changed several times throughout the investigation. This also led to a number of conspiracy theories.

The following month on November 5, a former USAF soldier killed 26 churchgoers at the First Baptist Church in the Sutherland Springs church shooting. It was the worst mass shooting that occurred in both the State of Texas and at an American place of worship in modern history, surpassing the Charleston church shooting of 2015 and the Waddell Buddhist temple shooting of 1991 respectively. The Pittsburgh Synagogue shooting of 2018 also led to major debates on weapon control and brought attention to gaps in reporting to the federal background-check system intended to ban convicted domestic abusers.

==== Hate crimes ====
After a decrease and legislation toughening laws in the 2000s, the late 2010s saw a rise in hate crimes. Hate crimes became the motive of many mass shootings, with race, sexual orientation, and religion becoming prominent targets.

On June 12, 2016, Omar Mateen shot and killed 49 people and himself at a gay nightclub in Orlando, Florida, in what was classified as a terrorist attack and a hate crime against the LGBTQ community. It was the deadliest mass shooting in American history at the time, surpassing the 2007 Virginia Tech shooting. A rise in attacks and killings of transgender individuals also occurred, with attention on underreporting in both statistics and media attention. The 2018 murder of Anthony Avalos and a 2022 mass shooting in Colorado Springs have continually brought renewed attention to attacks against the LGBTQ community.

On October 27, 2018, a gunman opened fire at the Tree of Life synagogue during Shabbat morning services, killing 11 people and injuring six more. The attack was the deadliest ever against the Jewish community in America; many of those killed had been Holocaust survivors. The shooting brought awareness to an increase in American antisemitism.

Hate crimes based on race continued to be the leading motive. White supremacist attacks against Black Americans garnered significant public attention, as did increasing attacks on Americans of Mexican descent and Americans of Asian descent. Examples include the 2019 El Paso Walmart shooting, 2022 Buffalo shooting, and an increase in Anti-Asian attacks during the COVID-19 pandemic.

==== Domestic terrorism and political violence ====
Concurrently to the rise in mass shootings, the late 2010s saw a sharp increase in domestic terror incidents. Several studies attributed this rise to an increase in attacks from groups with links to far right-wing extremism, religious extremism, and white supremacy.

In late October 2018, 16 packages containing pipe bombs were mailed via the US Postal Service to several prominent critics of US President Donald Trump, including leading Democratic Party politicians such as former US President Barack Obama, former US Vice President Joe Biden, and former US Secretary of State Hillary Clinton, as well as CNN offices in New York City. On March 21, 2019, Cesar Sayoc, 57, pleaded guilty to 65 felony charges related to the bombing, including using weapons of mass destruction and domestic terrorism.

2020 was marked by a rise in domestic terrorist threats and widespread conspiracy theories around mail-in voting and COVID-19. The QAnon conspiracy theory, a fringe far-right political movement among conservatives, gained publicity. Multiple major cities were hit by rioting and brawls between far-right groups such as the Proud Boys and left-leaning counter-protestors, such as those affiliated with the left-wing political movement Antifa. In March 2021, FBI director Christopher Wray confirmed an October 2020 report from the Department of Homeland Security that said white supremacists posed the top domestic terrorism threat. Wray noted that the threat from these groups had been elevated to the same level as ISIS. The January 6 United States Capitol attack was considered by many to be a domestic terror attack. The 2022 elections saw continued attempts of intimidation, and concern for attacks, at voting stations and election offices around the country.

Overall, political violence, perpetrated by all sides of the political spectrum, has become more common throughout the 2010s and 2020s. In 2017, a mass shooting targeted a practice session for the annual Congressional Baseball Game, injuring then U.S. House Majority Whip Steve Scalise. In 2020, the FBI announced the arrest of 13 people over a plot to kidnap Michigan governor Gretchen Whitmer. In 2022, Paul Pelosi, spouse to then Speaker of the House Nancy Pelosi, was attacked with a hammer. The attack was motivated by various far-right conspiracy theories. During the 2024 United States presidential election, Donald Trump faced numerous failed assassination attempts, including one in July near Butler, Pennsylvania and another in September in Florida. In December 2024, Brian Thompson, the CEO of UnitedHealthcare, was shot and killed in New York City, sparking debate over the American healthcare system. 2025 saw an attempted arson attack on the Pennsylvania Governor's Residence and the shootings of two Minnesota lawmakers. In September 2025, conservative political activist Charlie Kirk was assassinated at a Turning Point USA event at Utah Valley University. Trump faced another assassination attempt in 2026 at the 2026 White House Correspondents Dinner, which he survived. Also present at the shooting were numerous lawmakers, cabinet members, and political figures.

==== Deployment of federal forces ====
During the Second Trump Administration, Trump has ordered the deployment of federal law enforcement and the National Guard to U.S. cities under various reasons, including crackdowns on crime, protests, and undocumented immigrants. In response to protests against mass deportations in Los Angeles, Trump federalized the California National Guard and deployed U.S. Marines to the city. Trump then used dubious claims of crime in the District of Columbia to invoke the District of Columbia Home Rule Act, which allowed him to take over the District of Columbia Metropolitan Police Department and deploy federal forces to the District. In November 2025, two members of the West Virginia National Guard were shot during their deployment in the District. These deployments often come against the wishes of local elected officials, who have pursued legal action against the Trump administration.

The United States Department of Homeland Security has conducted large-scale operations and raids in cities to apprehend undocumented immigrants. In September 2025, Operation Midway Blitz saw the deployment of agents to the Chicago, Illinois area. Operation Metro Surge saw the deployment of ICE, Border Patrol, and CBP agents to the Twin Cities area of Minnesota. This operation caused widespread unrest in Minnesota as well as the killing of two U.S. citizens by federal law enforcement: Renée Good and Alex Pretti. These killings have spawned anti-ICE demonstrations and a general strike in Minnesota.

== 2025–26 fiscal crises ==
Starting on October 1, the government entered a government shutdown after failing to pass the annual funding bill in the Senate. The shutdown, which lasted until November 12, was finally ended after President Donald Trump signed into effect the funding bill. A second partial government shutdown went into effect on February 13 after US lawmakers failed to reach an agreement on the extension of the previous funding bill. This shutdown lasted until April 30, lasting 76 days, which surpassed the previous one as the longest government shutdown in US history.

In April 2026, the price of eggs had risen 3.2% since the start of President Trump's term, and the price of oil had risen 61%, the latter of which was caused by the Iranian blockage of the Strait of Hormuz, which was caused by the 2026 US-Iranian conflict.

== See also ==
- Outline of United States history
- Timeline of the history of the United States (1990–2009)
- Timeline of the history of the United States (2010–present)
- Timeline of modern American conservatism
- List of federal political scandals in the United States
- 2010s
- 2020s
