= Bibliography of the military–industrial complex =

This bibliography lists selected books and articles related to the military–industrial complex, a political concept describing the relationship between the government, the arms industry, and the military; especially in the United States.

== Cold War ==
- Adams, Gordon (1981). The Iron Triangle: The Politics of Defense Contracting. ISBN 978-0-87871-012-6.
- Adams, Walter (May 1968). "The Military-Industrial Complex and the New Industrial State" (PDF). American Economic Review. 58: 652–665. ISSN 0002-8282.
- Cook, Fred J. (1964). "The Warfare State". The Annals of the American Academy of Political and Social Science. 351: 102–109. ISSN 0002-7162.
- Duscha, Julius (1965). Arms, Money, and Politics. Ives Washburn.
- Eisenhower, Dwight D. (1961). Farewell Address to the American People.
- Koistinen, Paul A. C. (1970). "The "Industrial-Military Complex" in Historical Perspective: The InterWar Years". The Journal of American History. 56 (4): 819. doi:10.2307/1917520.
- Lapp, Ralph E. (1968). The weapons culture. New York: W. W. Norton. ISBN 978-0-393-05356-2.
- Lens, Sidney (1970). The military-industrial complex. Philadelphia: Pilgrim Press. ISBN 978-0-8298-0154-5.
- McDougall, Walter A. (1985). ...The Heavens and the Earth: A Political History of the Space Age. Basic Books. ISBN 978-1-59740-165-4.
- Melman, Seymour (1970). Pentagon Capitalism: The Political Economy of War. McGraw Hill. ISBN 978-0-07-041454-9.
- Melman, Seymour, ed. (1971). The War Economy of the United States: Readings in Military Industry and Economy. New York: St. Martin's Press.
- Melman, Seymour (1972). "Ten Propositions on the War Economy". American Economic Review. 62 (2): 312–18.
- Mills, C. Wright (1956). The Power Elite. Oxford University Press. ISBN 978-0-19-500020-7.
- Molander, Earl A. (1976). "Historical Antecedents of Military-Industrial Criticism". Military Affairs. 40 (2): 59–63. doi:10.2307/1987146. ISSN 0026-3931.
- Mollenhoff, Clark R. (1967). The Pentagon: Politics, Profits and Plunder. New York: G.P. Putnam's Sons.
- Nieburg, Harold L. (1970). In the Name of Science. Quadrangle Books.
- Pierre, Andrew J. (1982). The Global Politics of Arms Sales. Princeton University Press. ISBN 978-0-691-02207-9.
- Proxmire, William (1970). Report from Wasteland: America's Military-Industrial Complex. Praeger Publishers Inc. ISBN 978-0-275-02650-9.
- Pursell, Carroll W. (1972). The Military-industrial complex. Harper and Row. ISBN 978-0-06-045296-4.
- Sampson, Anthony (1977). The Arms Bazaar: From Lebanon to Lockheed. New York: Bantam Books. ISBN 978-0-670-13263-8.
- Shoup, David M. (April 1969). "The New American Militarism". The Atlantic.
- Weidenbaum, Murray L. (1968). "Arms and the American Economy: A Domestic Convergence Hypothesis". The American Economic Review. 58 (2): 428–437. ISSN 0002-8282 – via JSTOR.

== Post–Cold War ==
- Alic, John A. (2021). "The U.S. Politico–Military–Industrial Complex". Oxford Research Encyclopedia of Politics. doi:10.1093/acrefore/9780190228637.013.1870. ISBN 978-0-19-022863-7.
- Andreas, Joel (2001). Dorrel, Frank (ed.). Addicted to War: Why the U.S. Can't Kick Militarism. ISBN 1-904859-01-1.
- Byrne, Edmund F. (2017). "Military Industrial Complex (MIC)". Encyclopedia of Business and Professional Ethics. Springer International Publishing. pp. 1–5. doi:10.1007/978-3-319-23514-1_209-1. ISBN 978-3-319-23514-1.
- St. Claire, Jeffery (2005). Grand Theft Pentagon: Tales of Corruption and Profiteering in the War on Terror. Common Courage Press. ISBN 978-1-56751-336-3.
- Cockburn, Andrew (2019). "The Military–Industrial Virus: How bloated budgets gut our defenses". Harper's Magazine. 338 (2029): 61–67.
- Cockburn, Andrew (2021). "Why America Goes to War: Money drives the US military machine". The Nation. 313 (6): 24–27.
- Dunlap, Charles J. (2011). "The Military-Industrial Complex". Daedalus. 140 (3): 135–147. ISSN 0011-5266 – via JSTOR.
- Hartung, William D. (2001). "Eisenhower's Warning: The Military–Industrial Complex Forty Years Later". World Policy Journal. 18 (1). Archived from the original on 2005-09-10.
- Hartung, William D. (2010). Prophets of War: Lockheed Martin and the Making of the Military-Industrial Complex. New York: Nation Books. ISBN 978-1-4596-0893-1.
- Hartung, William D.; Freeman, Ben (2025). The Trillion Dollar War Machine: How Runaway Military Spending Drives America into Foreign Wars and Bankrupts Us at Home. Bold Type Books. ISBN 978-1-64503-063-8.
- Hooks, Gregory (2008). "Military–Industrial Complex, Organization and History". Encyclopedia of Violence, Peace, & Conflict (2nd ed.). pp. 1278–1286. doi:10.1016/B978-012373985-8.00109-4. ISBN 978-0-12-373985-8.
- Hossein-zadeh, Ismael (2006). The Political Economy of US Militarism. New York: Palgrave MacMillan. ISBN 978-0-230-60228-1.
- Johnson, Chalmers (2004). The Sorrows of Empire: Militarism, Secrecy, and the End of the Republic. New York: Metropolitan Books. ISBN 978-0-8050-7797-1.
- Keller, William W. (1995). Arm in Arm: The Political Economy of the Global Arms Trade. New York: Basic Books. ISBN 978-0-465-02667-8.
- Kurth, James (1999). "Military–Industrial Complex". In Chambers II, John Whiteclay (ed.). The Oxford Companion to American Military History. Oxford University Press. pp. 440–442. ISBN 978-0-19-507198-6.
- Lassman, Thomas C. (2015). "Putting the Military Back into the History of the Military–Industrial Complex: The Management of Technological Innovation in the U.S. Army, 1945–1960". Isis. 106 (1): 94–120 – via JSTOR.
- Ledbetter, James (2011). Unwarranted Influence: Dwight D. Eisenhower and the Military-Industrial Complex. Yale University Press. ISBN 978-0-300-15305-7.
- Lynn, William J. (2014). "The End of the Military-Industrial Complex: How the Pentagon Is Adapting to Globalization". Foreign Affairs. 93 (6): 104–106, 107–110 – via JSTOR.
- Mathews, Jessica T. (2019). "America's Indefensible Defense Budget". The New York Review of Books. LXVI (12): 23–24.
- Nelson, Lars-Erik (2000). "Military–Industrial Man". New York Review of Books. 47 (20): 6.
- Pasztor, Andy (1995). When the Pentagon Was for Sale: Inside America's Biggest Defense Scandal. Scribner. ISBN 0-684-19516-X.
- Preble, Christoper (2008). "Military–Industrial Complex". In Hamowy, Ronald (ed.). The Encyclopedia of Libertarianism. Thousand Oaks, CA: Sage; Cato Institute. pp. 328–329. ISBN 978-1-4129-6580-4.
- Roland, Alex (2021). Delta of Power: The Military–Industrial Complex. Baltimore: Johns Hopkins University Press. ISBN 978-1-4214-4181-8.
- Ritter, Daniel P.; McLauchlan, Gregory (2008). "Military–Industrial Complex, Contemporary Significance". Encyclopedia of Violence, Peace, & Conflict (Second ed.). pp. 1266–1278. doi:10.1016/B978-012373985-8.00104-5. ISBN 978-0-12-373985-8.
- Sweetman, Bill (2000). "In search of the Pentagon's billion dollar hidden budgets – how the US keeps its R&D spending under wraps". Jane's International Defence Review. Archived from the original on 2005-04-21.
- Thorpe, Rebecca U. (2014). The American Warfare State: The Domestic Politics of Military Spending. University of Chicago Press. ISBN 978-0-226-12407-0.
- Turse, Nick (2008). The Complex: How the Military Invades Our Everyday Lives. Metropolitan Books. ISBN 978-0-8050-7896-1.
- Weinberger, Sharon (2006). Imaginary Weapons. New York: Nation Books. ISBN 978-1-56025-849-0.

== See also ==
- List of bibliographies on American history
- Bibliography of United States military history
