= National Commission for Economic Conversion and Disarmament =

The National Commission for Economic Conversion and Disarmament was founded in 1988, with preliminary work starting as early as November 1987. The key principals behind the commission were Seymour Melman together with Jonathan Feldman and Robert Krinsky (students of Melman). The three, conceived of the commission as the extension of conversion activities, initiated at Columbia University linked to the Corliss Lamont Fellowship program in Economic Conversion and Disarmament.

The commission promoted public education related to economic conversion and disarmament, culminating in a series of conferences, workshops and organizing projects. Among the most significant was "The U.S. After the Cold War: Claiming the Peace Dividend", a national town meeting held on May 2, 1990, involving political leaders, scholars, activists and concerned citizens. Another key milestone was the support which former House Speaker Jim Wright gave to national conversion legislation, naming a comprehensive conversion bill HR 101 (corresponding to the 101st Session of Congress). The commission published a newsletter, The New Economy, and a series of briefing papers related to conversion and disarmament.

The commission supported multilateral disarmament and comprehensive conversion policies. The commission board included members of the United States Congress, trade union presidents, scholars and political leaders. In addition to Melman, key board members included Marcus Raskin, John Kenneth Galbraith, George McGovern, Ted Weiss, and various presidents of the Machinists Union (IAM).
