= Apobaterion =

Apobaterion (Greek ἀποβατήριον) may refer to:

- a farewell speech
- offerings made to the gods upon a safe landing
- a "place of landing", used of the landing of Noah's Ark, see Mount Judi
