= Joe Biden's farewell address =

2025 final official speech of US President Joe Biden

- Part of the presidency of Joe Biden and the second presidential transition of Donald Trump
- President Joe Biden delivers his farewell address to the nation in the Oval Office of the White House.
- Date: January 15, 2025
- Time: 8:00 p.m. EST
- Duration: 17 minutes
- Location: Oval Office, White House Washington, D.C., U.S.
- Type: Speech
- Participants: President Joe Biden
- Outcome: The Biden administration ends and the second Trump administration begins at noon EST on January 20, 2025.
- Media: Video

Joe Biden's farewell address was the final official speech of Joe Biden as the 46th president of the United States, delivered in the Oval Office on January 15, 2025.

== Background ==
Biden served his single term as the 46th President of the United States, winning the 2020 presidential election against Republican incumbent president Donald Trump. He was inaugurated on January 20, 2021. However, Trump refused to accept his loss and attempted to overturn the election results. While in office, Biden signed the American Rescue Plan Act, Infrastructure Investment and Jobs Act, CHIPS and Science Act, and Inflation Reduction Act in response to the COVID-19 pandemic and subsequent recession. He appointed Ketanji Brown Jackson to the Supreme Court of the United States. In his foreign policy, the U.S. reentered the Paris Agreement. Biden oversaw the complete withdrawal of U.S. troops that ended the war in Afghanistan, leading to the Taliban seizing control. He responded to the Russian invasion of Ukraine by imposing sanctions on Russia and authorizing aid to Ukraine. During the Gaza war, Biden condemned the actions of Hamas as terrorism, strongly supported Israel's military efforts, and sent limited humanitarian aid to the Gaza Strip. A temporary ceasefire proposal he backed was adopted shortly before he left office. Democrats controlled both houses of Congress until Republicans won a slim majority in the House of Representatives in the 2022 elections. Republicans took control of the Senate after the 2024 elections.

Concerns about Biden's age and health persisted throughout his term. He became the first president to turn 80 while in office. He began his presidency with majority support, but saw his approval ratings decline significantly throughout his presidency, in part due to public frustration over inflation, which peaked at 9.1% in June 2022 but dropped to 2.9% by the end of his presidency. Biden initially ran for re-election and, after the Democratic primaries, he became the party's presumptive nominee in the 2024 presidential election. After his poor performance in the first presidential debate, renewed scrutiny from across the political spectrum about his cognitive ability led him to ultimately withdraw from the race. Biden immediately endorsed Vice President Kamala Harris to replace him in his place as the party's presidential nominee. Harris subsequently became the Democratic presidential nominee at the 2024 Democratic National Convention with Tim Walz as her running mate, but they subsequently lost the general election to Trump and JD Vance. Biden's administration is ranked favorably by historians and scholars, diverging from public assessments of his tenure. He is the oldest living former U.S. president, the oldest living former U.S. vice president, and the oldest person to have served as president.

After Trump's victory, Biden and Trump met and commenced the presidential transition. During the period of Trump's being president-elect, he planned on having billionaires like Vivek Ramaswamy (before Ramaswamy's withdrawal) and Elon Musk in his second presidential administration. Once Trump was inaugurated on January 20, 2025, the Democratic Party would lose control of the presidency in addition to falling short of a majority in the House and Senate. The party also had a minority of state legislature seats and governorships.

== Address ==
Biden began his speech at 8:00 p.m. EST from the Oval Office. Biden's wife Jill, his son Hunter, Hunter's wife Melissa, their son Beau, Biden's granddaughter Finnegan, and vice president Kamala Harris and her husband Doug Emhoff were present in the Oval Office during the speech. He initially covered the history of the United States and described the Statue of Liberty as a representation of the U.S. Biden claimed that an oligarchy was taking hold in the U.S., invoking Dwight D. Eisenhower's farewell address, in which Eisenhower argued that the military–industrial complex was influencing the country; he criticized the "tech–industrial complex". He boasted of provisions to combat climate change in the Inflation Reduction Act. Biden indirectly criticized Meta Platforms's decision to end its fact-checking program. He also wished the incoming Trump administration "great success".

== Tech–industrial complex ==
Biden popularized the expression "tech–industrial complex" in his farewell address.

U.S. President Joe Biden used the term in his farewell address to the nation on January 15, 2025: The term alluded to Dwight D. Eisenhower's warning of the military–industrial complex in his farewell address and what Politico described as "echoing Roosevelt's language in calling out the 'robber barons' of a new dystopian Gilded Age". Since Elon Musk purchased Twitter, widespread allegations that the social media company has been manipulating its algorithm to promote right-wing content as well as to suppress left-wing content have been made. A Biden aide demurred when asked if Biden was referring to Elon Musk, but said that the billionaire "was certainly an example of one".

The comments came amid large financial donations by tech leaders to Donald Trump's second presidential inauguration and actions on the leaders' part seen as deferential to the president-elect. It also came amidst surging stock prices of "The Magnificent Seven", seven tech companies whose combined value rose 46% in 2024, vastly beating the S&P 500 share index. Other tech leaders described as part of the tech–industrial complex included Mark Zuckerberg, Jeff Bezos, Satya Nadella, Sundar Pichai, Shou Zi Chew, Tim Cook, and Vivek Ramaswamy.

== See also ==
- Barack Obama's farewell address
- Donald Trump's first farewell address
