= Chance for Peace speech =

1953 speech by U.S. President Eisenhower

- Part of Cold War
- Date: April 16, 1953
- Venue: Statler Hotel
- Location: Washington, D.C., United States; 38.9025°N 77.0372°W
- Also known as: "Cross of Iron" speech
- Type: Presidential address
- Theme: Cold War, global disarmament, human cost of military spending, international peace
- Cause: Death of Soviet Premier Joseph Stalin (March 1953) and subsequent geopolitical shifts
- Motive: To challenge the new Soviet leadership to join a mutual effort toward global de-escalation and peace
- Target: USSR leadership and the global public
- Organised by: American Society of Newspaper Editors
- Participants: Dwight D. Eisenhower
- Outcome: Widely praised as one of Eisenhower's finest speeches, though it failed to achieve a long-term breakthrough in Cold War relations
- Features the famous quote: "Every gun that is made, every warship launched, every rocket fired signifies, in the final sense, a theft from those who hunger and are not fed..."

The Chance for Peace speech, also known as the Cross of Iron speech, was an address given by U.S. president Dwight D. Eisenhower on April 16, 1953, shortly after the death of Soviet leader Joseph Stalin. Speaking only three months into his presidency, Eisenhower likened arms spending to stealing from the people, and evoked William Jennings Bryan in describing "humanity hanging from a cross of iron." Although Eisenhower, a former military man, spoke against increased military spending, the Cold War deepened during his administration and political pressures for increased military spending mounted. By the time he left office in 1961, he felt it necessary to warn of the military–industrial complex in his final address.

== Background ==
Eisenhower took office in January 1953, with the Korean War in a stalemate. Three and a half years prior, the Soviet Union had successfully detonated the atomic bomb named RDS-1, and appeared to reach approximate military parity with the United States. Political pressures for a more aggressive stance toward the Soviet Union mounted, and calls for increased military spending did as well. Stalin's death on March 5, 1953, briefly left a power vacuum in the Soviet Union and offered a chance for rapprochement with the new regime, as well as an opportunity to decrease military spending.

== The speech ==
The speech was addressed to the American Society of Newspaper Editors, in Washington D.C., on April 16, 1953. Eisenhower took an opportunity to highlight the cost of continued tensions and rivalry with the Soviet Union. While addressed to the American Society of Newspaper Editors, the speech was broadcast nationwide, through use of television and radio, from the Statler Hotel. He noted that not only were there military dangers (as had been demonstrated by the Korean War), but an arms race would place a huge domestic burden on both nations:

Every gun that is made, every warship launched, every rocket fired signifies, in the final sense, a theft from those who hunger and are not fed, those who are cold and are not clothed.
This world in arms is not spending money alone. It is spending the sweat of its laborers, the genius of its scientists, the hopes of its children. The cost of one modern heavy bomber is this: a modern brick school in more than 30 cities. It is two electric power plants, each serving a town of 60,000 population. It is two fine, fully equipped hospitals. It is some fifty miles of concrete pavement. We pay for a single fighter with a half-million bushels of wheat. We pay for a single destroyer with new homes that could have housed more than 8,000 people. . . . This is not a way of life at all, in any true sense. Under the cloud of threatening war, it is humanity hanging from a cross of iron.

== Legacy ==
Eisenhower's "humanity hanging from a cross of iron" evoked William Jennings Bryan's Cross of Gold speech. As a result, "The Chance for Peace speech", colloquially, became known as the "Cross of Iron speech" and was seen by many as contrasting the Soviet Union's view of the post-World War II world with the United States' cooperation and national reunion view.

Despite Eisenhower's hopes as expressed in the speech, the Cold War deepened during his time in office. His farewell address was "a bookend" to his Chance for Peace speech. In that speech, he implored Americans to think to the future and "not to become the insolvent phantom of tomorrow", but the large peacetime military budgets that became established during his administration have continued for half a century.
