= Joel Andreas =

American sociologist

Joel Andreas is an American author and college professor. He holds a Ph.D. in sociology from the University of California in Los Angeles, and currently teaches at Johns Hopkins University in Baltimore, which he joined in 2003. His research interests include political contention, social inequality, and social change in China today.

== Early life and academic career ==
Andreas spent his early childhood in Detroit, and became interested in political activism when he accompanied his parents to political demonstrations against the Vietnam War. His younger brother, Peter, now a professor at Brown University, described their later childhood after their parents split. Their father, Carl, was more conservative than their mother, Carol Rich Andreas. Carl was benefits manager for the United Auto Workers and Carol a leader of the Michigan Women's Liberation Coalition. After the divorce, she took the children to Berkeley, California.

After working in an automobile plant and as a printer, Andreas attended University of Illinois at Chicago then proceeded to take a PhD in sociology at University of California at Los Angeles.

In 2017, he received a grant from the American Council of Learned Societies to convene a conference, "Land Dispossession in Rural China and India."

== Graphic novels ==
Prior to the publishing of Rise of the Red Engineers in 2009 many of Andreas's published writings had been graphic novels. The first of these was The Incredible Rocky, an unauthorized biography of the Rockefeller family. Although Andreas wrote the book while still in high school, it went on to sell nearly 100,000 copies. Next came Made with Pure Rocky Mountain Scab Labor, meant to support a strike by Coors Brewing Company workers. His latest graphic novel is Addicted to War: Why the U.S. Can't Kick Militarism, which has been approved by the San Francisco School District as a supplemental book to be used by high school history teachers.

Andreas's style of illustrated books was originally inspired by those of Eduardo "Rius" del Río.

== Published works ==
- The Incredible Rocky (PDF) (1975). New York: NACLA, ISBN 0-9596607-0-4. Archived from the original on July 23, 2011.
- Made with Pure Rocky Mountain Scab Labor
- Dorrel, Frank (ed). Addicted to War: Why the U.S. Can't Kick Militarism (2002). Oakland, California: AK Press, ISBN 1-904859-02-X.
- —— (2019). Disenfranchised: The Rise and Fall of Industrial Citizenship in China. New York: New York : Oxford University Press. ISBN 9780190052607.
- —— (2009). Rise of the Red Engineers : The Cultural Revolution and the Origins of China's New Class. Stanford, Calif.: Stanford, Calif. : Stanford University Press. ISBN 9780804760775.
- —— (2007). "The Structure of Charismatic Mobilization: A Case Study of Rebellion During the Chinese Cultural Revolution". American Sociological Review. 72 (3): 434–458 (25). doi:10.1177/000312240707200306. S2CID 16214909.
- —— (2004). "Leveling the Little Pagoda: The Impact of College Examinations, and Their Elimination, on Rural Education in China". Comparative Education Review. 48: 1–47. doi:10.1086/379840. S2CID 146462106.
- —— (2002). "Battling over Political and Cultural Power During the Chinese Cultural Revolution". Theory and Society. 31 (4): 463–519. doi:10.1023/A:1020949030112. S2CID 55652966.
