= Barack Obama's farewell address =

- Part of the presidency of Barack Obama and the first presidential transition of Donald Trump
- President Barack Obama delivers his farewell address to the nation at the McCormick Place in Chicago, Illinois.
- Date: January 10, 2017
- Time: 9:00 p.m. EST
- Duration: 51 minutes
- Location: McCormick Place, Chicago, Illinois, U.S.
- Type: Speech
- Participants: President Barack Obama
- Outcome: The Obama administration ends and the first Trump administration begins at noon EST on January 20, 2017.
- Media: Video

Barack Obama's farewell address was the final public speech of Barack Obama as the 44th President of the United States, delivered on January 10, 2017 at 9:00 p.m. EST. The farewell address was broadcast on various television and radio stations and livestreamed online by the White House. An estimated 24 million people watched the address live on television.

== Background ==
Obama served his two terms as the 44th President of the United States, first winning the 2008 presidential election against Republican nominee John McCain and then winning the 2012 presidential election against Republican nominee Mitt Romney. Obama was the first African American to serve as president of the United States. While in office, his administration addressed the 2008 financial crisis (including a major stimulus package), oversaw the passage and implementation of the Patient Protection and Affordable Care Act, partially extended Bush tax cuts, took executive action on immigration reform, and took steps to combat climate change and carbon emissions. He appointed Sonia Sotomayor and Elena Kagan to the Supreme Court of the United States. In his foreign policy, Obama also authorized the raid that killed Osama bin Laden, signed the New START treaty with Russia, signed the Paris Agreement, and negotiated rapprochements with Iran and Cuba. Democrats controlled both houses of Congress until Republicans won a majority in the House of Representatives in the 2010 elections. Republicans took control of the Senate after the 2014 elections, and Obama continued to grapple with Congressional Republicans over government spending, immigration, judicial nominations, and other issues.

In the 2016 presidential election, Obama was ineligible to seek reelection to a third term due to the restrictions of the Twenty-second Amendment. In June 2016, Obama endorsed his former Secretary of State, Hillary Clinton, to succeed him as president. He addressed the 2016 Democratic National Convention on July 27 in support of Clinton as the Democratic Party's nominee, and continued to campaign for her throughout the 2016 general election campaign season. However, Hillary Clinton would unexpectedly lose the general election to Republican nominee Donald Trump on November 8, after failing to receive enough votes in the Electoral College, despite receiving a plurality of the national popular vote. After Trump's victory, Obama and Trump met and commenced the presidential transition, during the period of Trump's being president-elect. Once Trump was inaugurated on January 20, 2017, the Democratic Party would lose control of the presidency in addition to falling short of a majority in the House and Senate. The party also had a minority of state legislature seats and governorships. President Obama's approval ratings were nearly at 60 percent at the time of his farewell speech.

== Venue ==
In a break with recent tradition, President Obama did not deliver his farewell address at the White House. Instead, he gave the speech at the McCormick Place convention center in his home city of Chicago, less than 4 miles (6.4 km) from Grant Park, where he delivered his 2008 election victory speech. McCormick Place was also the same venue where Obama delivered his 2012 reelection victory speech. The event was open to the public, with free tickets being distributed on a first-come, first-served basis on January 7.

== Composition ==
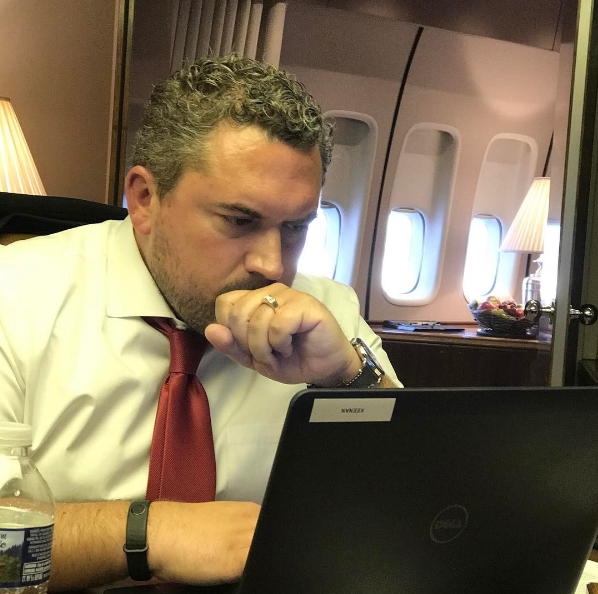
Keenan checks Obama's farewell address one last time aboard Air Force One en route to Chicago.

On January 2, 2017, President Obama released a post on the White House blog publicly announcing that he would deliver his farewell address in his hometown of Chicago, and stated that he was "just beginning" to write his remarks and that he was "thinking about them as a chance to say thank you for this amazing journey, to celebrate the ways you've changed this country for the better these past eight years, and to offer some thoughts on where we all go from here."

The farewell address was written by President Obama, who dictated passages to Cody Keenan, the White House Director of Speechwriting. The President and Keenan went through at least four drafts of the speech. Former White House speechwriter Jon Favreau and former senior advisor David Axelrod also contributed to the drafting process.

== Summary ==
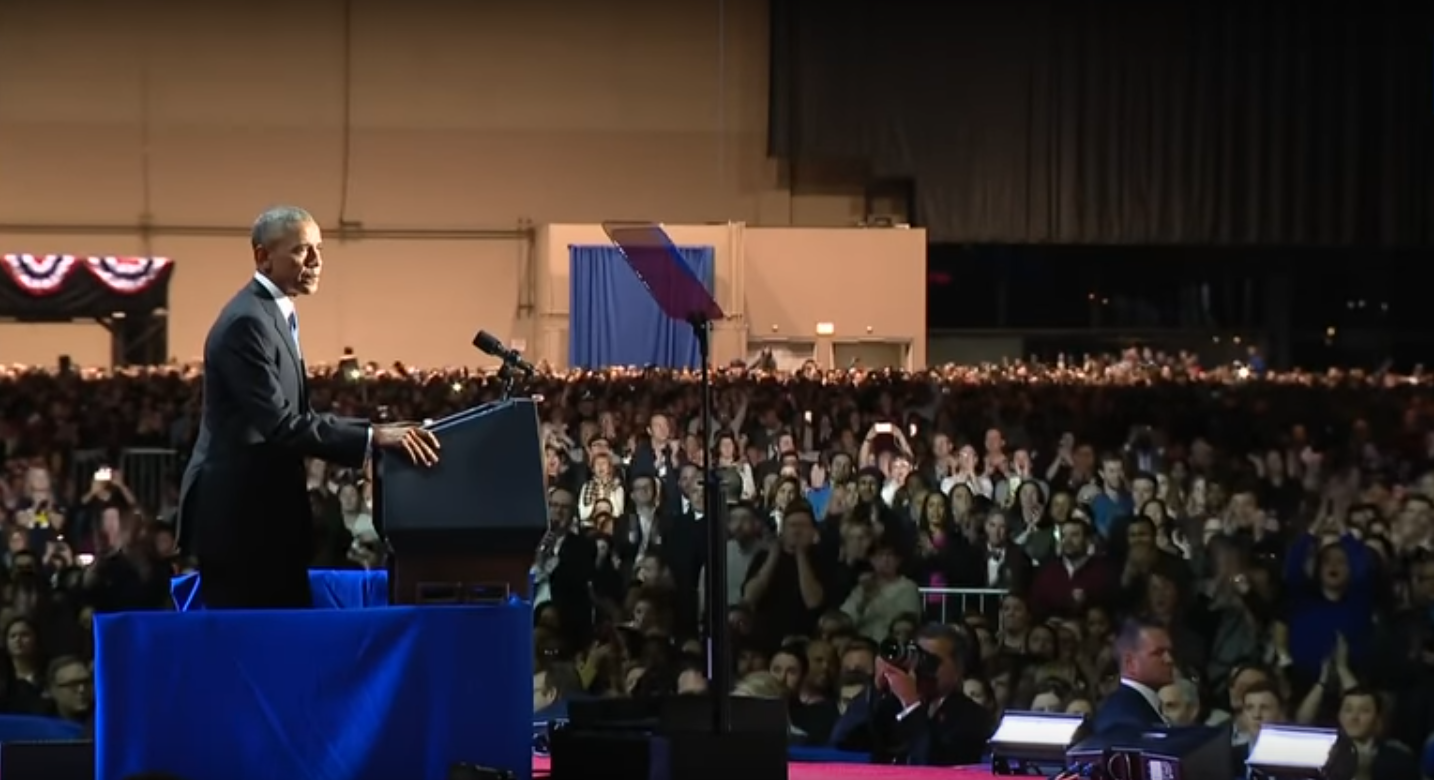
Obama delivers the address.

During the speech, Obama referred to advancements made during his presidency, such as reversing the Great Recession, creating many new jobs, shutting down Iran's nuclear weapons programme and achieving marriage equality. Obama suggested one who is frustrated with elected officials in their state should run for office themselves. Additionally, he elaborated upon the values of the first lady Michelle Obama and his daughters to himself and the nation. Obama also addressed class divides and racial tensions following Trump’s surprise victory: “After all, if every economic issue is framed as a struggle between a hard-working white middle class and undeserving minorities, then workers of all shades will be left fighting for scraps while the wealthy withdraw further into their private enclaves”. The president noted that Americans of both parties were doing the country a disservice by subscribing to facts that adhere to their confirmation bias.

At the denouement, Obama restated the slogan from his initial 2008 presidential campaign once more: "Yes we can. Yes we did, yes we can. Thank you, God bless you. May God continue to bless the United States of America. Thank you."

== See also ==
- Donald Trump's first farewell address
- Joe Biden's farewell address
