= Military–industrial complex =

Concept in military and political science

The expression military–industrial complex (MIC) describes the relationship between a country's military and the defense industry that supplies it, seen together as a vested interest which influences public policy. A driving factor behind the relationship between the military and the defense corporations is that both sides benefit—one side from obtaining weapons, and the other from being paid to supply them.

The concept of a military-industrial complex is unique to the United States, or at least use of the term with reference to other countries entails significant ambiguity as to the meaning. The expression gained popularity after a warning of the relationship's harmful effects, in the farewell address of U.S. president Dwight D. Eisenhower in 1961. The term has also been used in relation to Russia, especially since the beginning of the Russo-Ukrainian war.

== Eisenhower ==
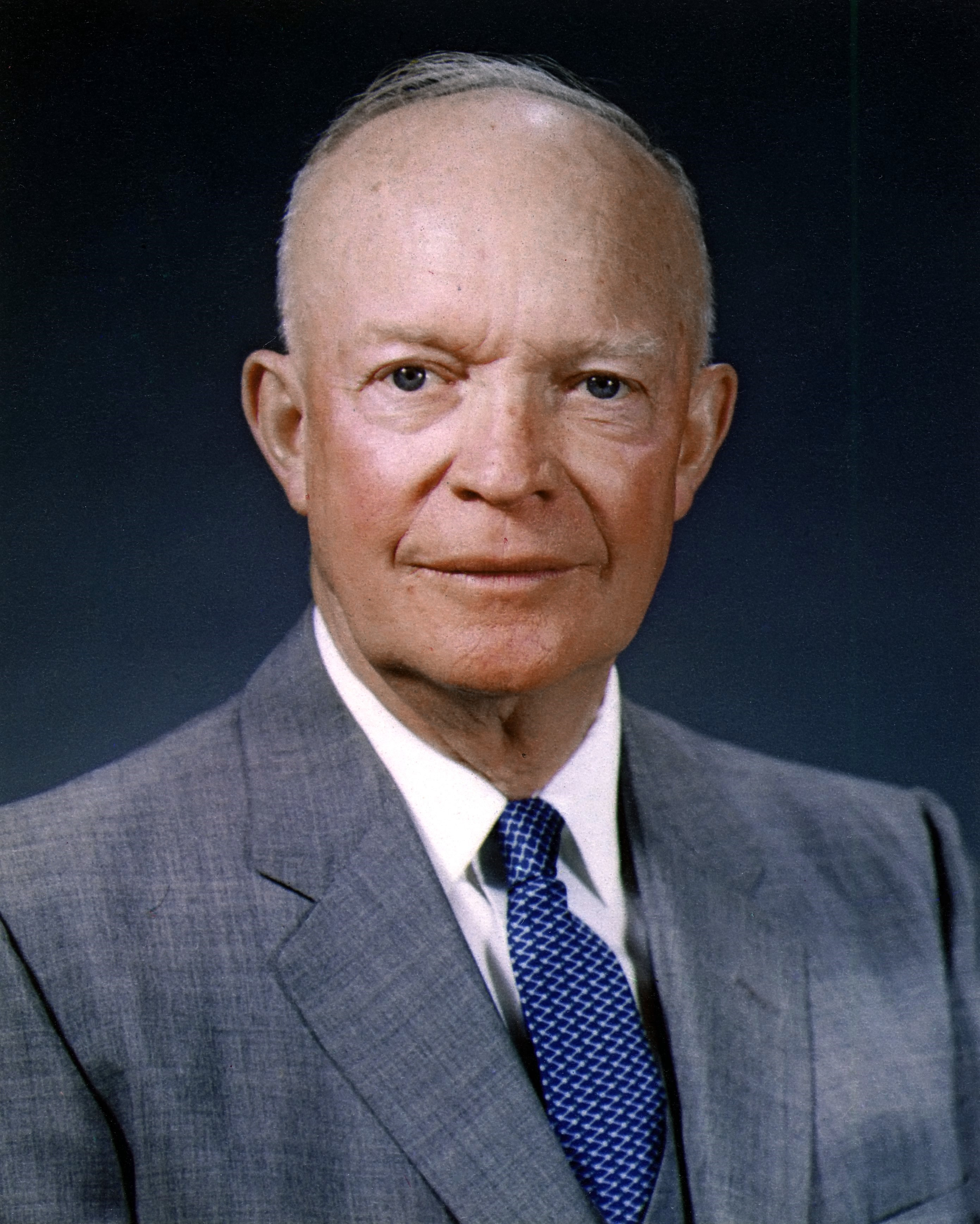
In his farewell address, U.S. President Dwight D. Eisenhower famously warned U.S. citizens about the "military–industrial complex".

Eisenhower's farewell address, January 17, 1961. The term military–industrial complex is used at 8:16. Length: 15:30

U.S. president Dwight D. Eisenhower used the term in his Farewell Address to the Nation on January 17, 1961:

A vital element in keeping the peace is our military establishment. Our arms must be mighty, ready for instant action, so that no potential aggressor may be tempted to risk his own destruction... This conjunction of an immense military establishment and a large arms industry is new in the American experience. The total influence—economic, political, even spiritual—is felt in every city, every statehouse, every office of the federal government. We recognize the imperative need for this development. Yet we must not fail to comprehend its grave implications. Our toil, resources and livelihood are all involved; so is the very structure of our society. In the councils of government, we must guard against the acquisition of unwarranted influence, whether sought or unsought, by the military–industrial complex. The potential for the disastrous rise of misplaced power exists, and will persist. We must never let the weight of this combination endanger our liberties or democratic processes. We should take nothing for granted. Only an alert and knowledgeable citizenry can compel the proper meshing of the huge industrial and military machinery of defense with our peaceful methods and goals so that security and liberty may prosper together. [emphasis added]

The speech was authored by Ralph E. Williams and Malcolm Moos and was foreshadowed by a passage in the 1954 book Power Through Purpose coauthored by Moos. The degree to which Eisenhower and his brother Milton shaped the speech is unclear from surviving documents. Planning commenced in early 1959; however, the earliest archival evidence of a military–industrial complex theme is a late-1960 memo by Williams that includes the phrase war based industrial complex. A wide range of interpretations have been made of the speech's meaning.

While the term military–industrial complex is often ascribed to Eisenhower, he was neither the first to use the phrase, nor the first to warn of such a potential danger. The first known use of military-industrial complex was by Winfield W. Riefler in 1947. (Note: An earlier use in 1931 referred to a specific steel-producing region of the Soviet Union, rather than a relationship between political entities, according to James Ledbetter.) Riefler attributed the outcome of the war to the balance of aggregate economic potentials of the belligerents which he termed "military-industrial complexes". C. Wright Mills's 1956 book The Power Elite is thematically similar to Eisenhower's farewell address and was used as a conceptual framework for the military–industrial complex debate in the 1960s and 1970s. Mills said that American society had cleaved into a powerful elite of military and corporate chieftains set against a powerless mass society.

== United States ==
=== Vietnam war ===
The phrase rose to prominence in the years following Eisenhower's farewell address, as part of opposition to the Vietnam War. John Kenneth Galbraith said that he and others quoted Eisenhower's farewell address "for the flank protection it provided" when criticizing military power given Eisenhower's "impeccably conservative" reputation.

Labor leaders and activists adopted the phrase and imbued it with new meanings. The earliest documented reference to Eisenhower's speech by activists of the New Left appears to be the Port Huron Statement which used military-industrial complex more in the sense of C. Wright Mills's power elite than Eisenhower's sense. According to James Ledbetter, Eisenhower was likely mentioned in the Port Huron Statement to provide gravitas that a direct reference to Mills would have lacked. While the general concerns expressed about a military-industrial complex in the Port Huron Statement share roots with the thinking of Eisenhower's speechwriters, the Port Huron Statement recast the concept of a military-industrial complex in the mold of false consciousness.

Martin Luther King Jr. delivered a sermon in 1963 that depicted the military-industrial complex as a force of fear and coercion:

Millions of citizens are deeply disturbed that the military-industrial complex too often shapes national policy, but they do not want to be considered unpatriotic. Countless loyal Americans honestly feel that a world body such as the United Nations should include even Red China, but they fear being called Communist sympathizers.

During the early 1960s, military-industrial complex became a floating signifier associated with populist discontent over collectivism, automation, and elites. Clark Kerr wrote that intellect had become an instrument of the military-industrial complex. Mario Savio predicted that the Free Speech Movement at UC Berkeley would likely spread to other universities that he said served the military-industrial complex. These pronouncements marked a shift from Eisenhower's future-tense warning that a military-industrial complex might someday threaten liberty, to an assumption that it had already corrupted American universities.

Dow Chemical became synonymous with industrial complicity in the Vietnam War after 1966 when it signed an Air Force contract to manufacture napalm. Although Dow was a relatively minor player in the arms industry, its association with napalm resulted in intense criticism. Ramparts published particularly gruesome accounts of napalm use in Vietnam as part of the magazine's activism opposing the war. Picketers carried signs outside a Dow office saying "Napalm Burns Babies, Dow Makes Money." A Dow executive said, "I would hate for Dow to come out of Viet Nam with the 'Merchants of Death' label that was pinned on du Pont after the first World War; and yet, unless we come to grips with this problem, it is likely to happen."

Opposition to industrial firms and universities became increasingly violent toward the end of the 1960s. Nine shareholder meetings were attacked in 1970 including those of Boeing and Gulf Oil. Marv Davidov started the Honeywell Project on the premise that Honeywell's production of cluster munitions was complicity in war crimes. The Honeywell Project purchased shares of Honeywell to gain access to the 1970 shareholder meeting. Thousands of protestors attended, cutting the meeting short. Hundreds began throwing bottles at the Honeywell headquarters and were then teargassed by Minneapolis police. Following the start of the Cambodian campaign and the Kent State shootings, Honeywell Project members participated in a large-scale strike at University of Minnesota. They demanded that the university evict the Reserve Officers' Training Corps, divest from arms makers, and cease all military research.

University research on chemical and biological weapons faced particular criticism at the University of Pennsylvania, Stanford University, and MIT. Congress responded by passing the Mansfield Amendment of 1969 to restrict the scope of university research that could be sponsored by the military. Stanford responded by spinning off military-sponsored research to SRI International. MIT did the same by spinning off Draper Laboratory.

Exposure of COINTELPRO and the revelation in 1967 that the National Student Association was involved in overseas activities funded by the CIA contributed to a general sense that society was being militarized. J. William Fulbright said that the military was manipulating public opinion via propaganda to garner support both for itself and the Vietnam War.

The concept of the military-industrial complex expanded among opponents of the Vietnam War to encompass the idea that any association with industry was tantamount to complicity in an unjust war. An intellectual tradition developed that put forth provocative theories and fierce criticism. Activists focused on ties between military spending and the civilian economy. One area of elaboration was a focus on Congress and corporate lobbying. During the 1970s, an academic publishing boom occurred on the subject of the military-industrial complex with specific attention paid to partisan politics, regional military spending, Congressional committees, and defense subcontractors. The most strident critics voiced the opinion that militarism is an inherent aspect of the U.S.

Non-governmental organizations and public intellectuals took up the military-industrial complex concept around the time that two books associated with the Institute for Policy Studies were published: The Economy of Death and The Pentagon Watchers. The latter was written by a group of students including Derek Shearer and Leonard Rodberg and opens by arguing that a growing military-industrial complex was pushing America toward fascism. The Brookings Institution published Government Contracting and Technological Change which described the military as a profligate spender and focused particularly on large budget overruns during the 1950s. SANE lobbied for arms control and nuclear test ban treaties. The Quaker organization NARMIC formed in 1969 for the purpose of distributing and publishing information about the military-industrial complex.

The Council on Economic Priorities debuted in 1969 with the publication of Efficiency in Death which focused on cluster bombs. While the book was presented as a dispassionate presentation of data collected by NARMIC on arms makers, it insinuated that any personal association with these companies was to be complicit in the gruesome napalm killing of Vietnamese civilians. Efficiency in Death is an early example of advocacy for socially responsible investing.

Seymour Melman, co-founder of SANE, devoted his career to advocating for economic conversion. From 1962 until 1970 he published academic analyses focused on the mechanics of converting the military industries to purely civilian economic activities. He argued that the arms industry distracted talented workers from more important civilian work, citing the guns versus butter model. Lloyd J. Dumas likewise said that military spending consumes resources that could instead contribute to economic growth. Melman turned acerbic in 1970 with the publication of Pentagon Capitalism in which he described the American economy as being thoroughly controlled by the military-industrial complex which he described as "parasitic".

Murray Weidenbaum said that the military-industrial complex directly harms defense contractors. His free market perspective was that dependency on government contracts reduces the growth potential of a company. He cautioned against convergence of the military and its suppliers, pointing to his former employer Boeing as an example of a company that owed its success to focussing on commercial, rather than military, customers. John Kenneth Galbraith, on the other hand, said that society would be better off if the arms industry were nationalized because this would save taxpayers money. Proxmire said that contractors such as Lockheed Aircraft were already on "corporate welfare".

=== War on terror ===
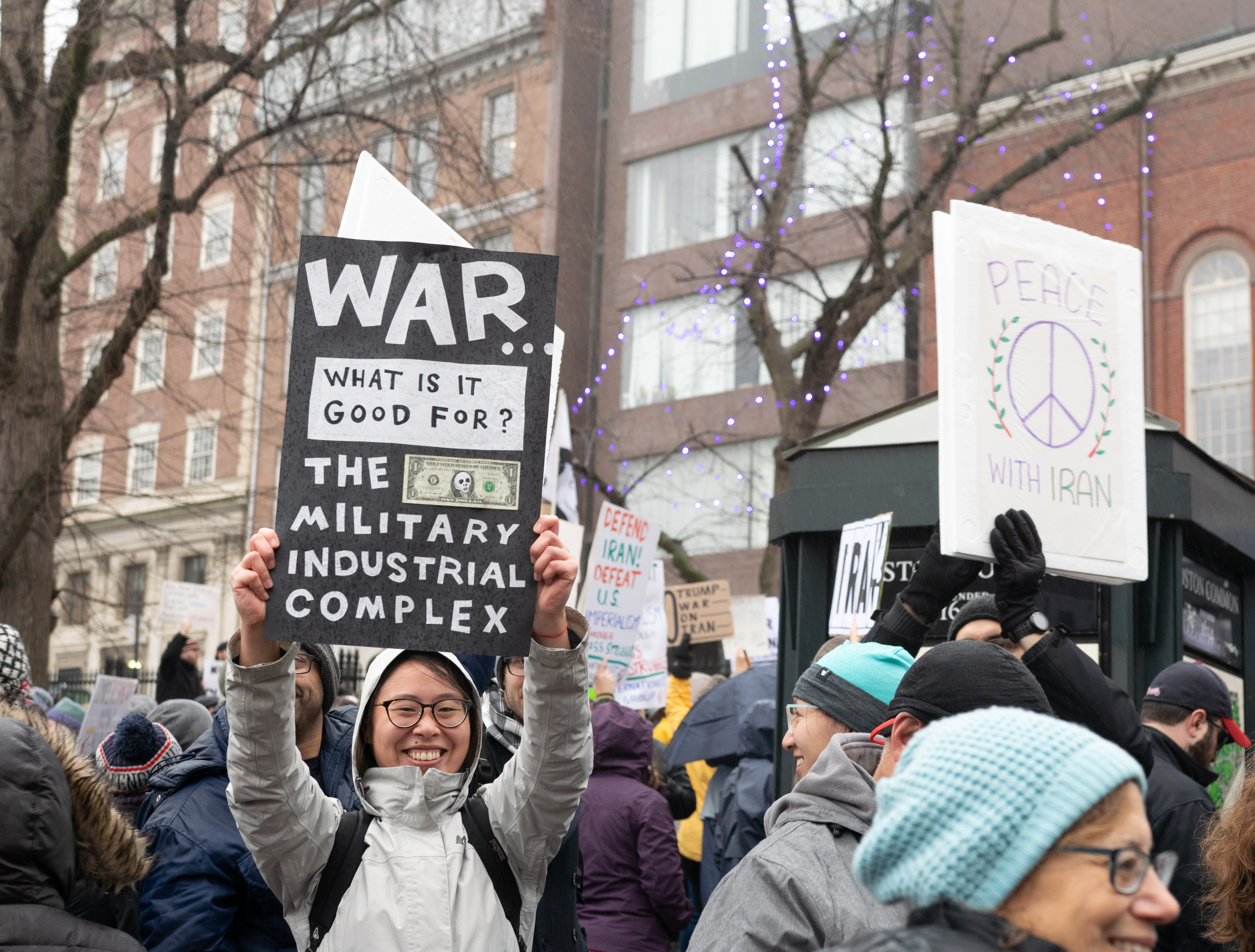
Anti-war protestor with sign criticizing the military–industrial complex

The war on terror caused a revival of military-industrial complex in popular culture. Why We Fight depicted the military-industrial complex as being the prime mover behind the Iraq War and described Eisenhower's farewell address as having foreshadowed this dynamic. Why We Fight focused particular attention on the Dick Cheney / Halliburton controversy. Liberals blamed the Iraq War on the military-industrial complex and dismissed George W. Bush as a supporter of the complex.

A 2018 poll concluded that 3 in 4 Americans believe that "a group of unelected government and military officials" are either definitely or probably "secretly manipulating or directing" the Government.

=== Spending concerns ===
Concerns over the economic burden of defense feature prominently in ideas of American decline. Paul Kennedy said in The Rise and Fall of the Great Powers that the debate over the proper level of defense spending is highly controversial in America and that the evidence doesn't point simply in one direction. He said that wealth and military power are closely related since each is required for the other, but that imperial overstretch leads to long-term decline of national power.

Constituting as it now does the greatest single purchaser in the American market, with all the power that implies, anchored in long-term contractual obligations that defy the normal budgetary discretion of Congress, its tentacles now reaching into almost every congressional district and distorting the electoral situations wherever they reach, this military-industrial establishment has become a veritable addiction of American society ...

— George F. Kennan

Scholars J. Paul Dunne and Elisabeth Sköns argued that, during the Cold War, the monopsonistic structure of the arms market, and high potential for profit, influenced firms to specialize in defense. These firms would seek to obtain contracts for advanced weapons programs, and would understate risk or cost to win these contracts. Risk was borne by the government, and emphasis was placed on performance instead of cost. The military would continually request additions and improvements, termed gold-plating, allowing renegotiation that generally benefited the contractor. Many contractors were in near-monopoly positions. According to Dunne and Sköns, these market conditions constituted a military–industrial complex (a group with vested interests in high military spending) that led to increased costs, corruption, and inefficiency. Dunne and Sköns argue that, while the meaning of military–industrial complex is sometimes vague, with no consistent theoretical foundation, there exists an MIC which influences military spending policy.

=== Proxmire ===
Proxmire's The Economics of Military Procurement was highly influential among critics of the military-industrial complex.

William Proxmire was the chief advocate for the idea of the military-industrial complex as an unaccountable bureaucracy that wastes resources in order to turn a profit. He achieved prominence in this role in 1968 when he was featured on the front page of the New York Times after giving a press conference where he named 23 defense contractors who he said were engaged in "shocking abuse". Proxmire was quoted as saying: "I think this is an excellent example of the military industrial complex at work, with the victim being ... the taxpayer". James Ledbetter said that Proxmire's attacks on the military-industrial complex were interpreted as a proxy for opposition to the Vietnam War. Proxmire said that the C-5A Galaxy jet was "one of the greatest fiscal disasters in the history of military contracting." He secured the testimony of U.S. Air Force whistleblower A. Ernest Fitzgerald before Congress. Fitzgerald testified in 1968 that cost overruns on the C-5A would reach $2 billion (equivalent to $14 billion in 2025) due to underestimation of costs, ineffective cost controls, and perverse incentives inherent in the repricing formula of the contract. The Air Force responded by saying that the actual overrun was half what Fitzgerald claimed. Proxmire said the Air Force was concealing the full extent of the overrun and pressed the Government Accountability Office to investigate the entire project. Proxmire called Congress a "pushover for the Pentagon" which is a view that others adopted. Arnold Kanter said that Congress rarely opposed the military budget requested by the President.

=== Connotations in U.S. politics ===
The phrase military-industrial complex is often employed as a pejorative. Some scholars say that it suggests the existence of a conspiracy. David S. Rohde compares its use in U.S. politics by liberals to that of the phrase deep state by conservatives.

In the half century since Eisenhower uttered his prophetic words, the concept of the military–industrial complex has become a rhetorical Rorschach blot—the meaning is in the eye of the beholder. The very utility of the phrase, the source of its mass appeal, comes at the cost of a precise, universally accepted definition.

— James Ledbetter

== Russia ==
While there are many references to a Russian or Soviet military–industrial complex, this is partly the result of word-for-word translation that fails to account for the nuances of Russian and English grammar. Voenno-promyshlennyi kompleks is the Russian term commonly translated into English as military–industrial complex. However, the adjectival voenno- (military) modifies promyshlennyi (industrial) rather than the complex. In other words, it refers to the military industries taken together as a group, or what is known as a defense industrial base in English.

According to Philip Luck of the Center for Strategic and International Studies, the Russo-Ukrainian war has "created a new class of economic beneficiaries—industries and individuals profiting from the war—who now have a vested interest in sustaining Putin's war economy". Russian political scientist Ekaterina Schulmann refers to this as a new "military–industrial class" whose welfare depends on the continuation of the war. Likewise, Luke Cooper of the Peace and Conflict Resolution Evidence Platform writes that "Russia has created a rent-based military industrial complex whose elites have an interest in large scale military spending". He says that while this military–industrial complex would have an incentive to oppose peace negotiations, "it seems plausible that the militarisation of the economy would remain a priority in a post-war situation regardless", justified by the "threat" from the West.

=== Soviet Union ===
The Red Army sought control over Soviet industry in the 1920s during Lenin's reign, but Stalin actively prevented the formation of a military-industrial complex that could have challenged his power. He used a divide and rule strategy to prevent collusion between military and industrial factions. Although Stalin needed a strong military to defend himself against external threats and used the Soviet military command to execute industrialization and the transition to a command economy, he also came to fear military and industrial leaders. Stalin structured incentives so that military and industrial actors gained more from rivalry and cheating one another than from cooperation.

The heavily militarized economy of the Soviet Union illustrates the dangers inherent in militarism, despite the lack of a military-industrial complex. A climate of secrecy and control, rigid centralized allocation of resources, economic isolation from the rest of the world, and unquestioning acceptance of government actions were all predicated on national security. The economic and societal costs were in many cases not tracked, or were withheld from civilians. Because these costs were hidden in the Soviet system, but exposed by the transition to a market economy, many Russians blame the new market economy of the Russian Federation for creating these costs in the first place.

== Similar terms ==
Military-industrial complex has become a snowclone connoting triumph of the profit motive over rational policy. Examples of phrases using the template include:

- Animal–industrial complex
- Climate-industrial complex—climate change denial
- Corporate consumption complex.
- Entertainment–industrial complex
- Medical–industrial complex
- Organic-industrial complex—marketing of processed foods involving greenwashing
- Pharmaceutical–industrial complex
- Prison-industrial complex—criticism of prison system expansion
- Real estate industrial complex—2008 financial crisis

== Academic debate ==
The value of military-industrial complex for academic analysis was questioned by numerous scholars within a few years of the idea's introduction. However, Steve J. Rosen said in 1973 that C. Wright Mills's theory of the military-industrial complex is "a most useful analytical construct".

The notion of military‐industrial complexes, or MICs, has, however, become so politically and conceptually loaded as to make it almost meaningless as an analytical concept, especially when studying the years prior to 1939.

— Miller, Turnbull, and Jari Ojala

Linda Weiss said that military-industrial complex has impeded economic research by promoting an assumption that businesses involved in the arms industry are an enclave walled off from the rest of the economy. She said that this assumption is exemplified by Ann Markusen's comments that the military-industrial complex is a "separate but not equal segment of U.S. industry" "dominated by large firms" that's "inflexible" and "unable to shift easily to commercial production". Weiss said that this view has prevented recognition of the significant ways in which government defense activities have shaped the U.S. civilian economy.

== See also ==
- Arms race
- Deterrence theory
- Economics of defense
- Iron triangle
- Last Supper (Defense industry)
- Military–civil fusion
- Military–industrial complex bibliography
- Military Keynesianism
- War profiteering
