= Donald Trump's first farewell address =

- Part of the first presidency of Donald Trump and the presidential transition of Joe Biden
- President Donald Trump delivers his farewell address to the nation in the Blue Room of the White House.
- Date: January 19, 2021
- Duration: 19 minutes
- Location: Blue Room, White House 1600 Pennsylvania Ave., Washington, D.C., United States
- Type: Speech
- Participants: President Donald Trump
- Outcome: The first Trump administration ends and the Biden administration begins at noon EST on January 20, 2021.
- Media: Video

Donald Trump's first farewell address was the final official speech of Donald Trump as the 45th President of the United States, delivered as a recorded, online video message on January 19, 2021. The farewell address was delivered the day before Joe Biden, who defeated him in the 2020 United States presidential election, was sworn in as his successor. Trump was the first president to fail to attend his successor's inauguration since Richard Nixon in 1974.

The official archived Trump White House website highlighted Trump's sentiments that:

"To serve as your President has been an honor beyond description. Thank you for this extraordinary privilege. And that’s what it is—a great privilege and a great honor. [...] With the support and prayers of the American people, we achieved more than anyone thought possible. Nobody thought we could even come close. [...] This, I hope, will be our greatest legacy: Together, we put the American people back in charge of our country. [...] We are, and must always be, a land of hope, of light, and of glory to all the world. This is the precious inheritance that we must safeguard at every single turn."

Trump would eschew public appearances in the months following his term, but he soon resumed speeches and would win in the 2024 United States presidential election.

== Background ==
Trump served his first term as the 45th President of the United States, winning the 2016 presidential election against Democratic nominee Hillary Clinton. He was inaugurated on January 20, 2017. While in office, Trump cut back spending to major welfare programs, enacted tariffs, withdrew from the Trans-Pacific Partnership negotiations and signed the USMCA, a successor agreement to NAFTA, grew the national debt through spending increases and tax cuts for the rich, and enacted a unilateral foreign policy based in offensive realism. He appointed Neil Gorsuch, Brett Kavanaugh, and Amy Coney Barrett to the Supreme Court of the United States. Republicans controlled both houses of Congress until Democrats won a majority in the House of Representatives in the 2018 elections. Democrats took control of the Senate after the 2020 elections.

Trump was involved in many controversies related to his policies, conduct, and false or misleading statements, including an investigation into the Trump campaign's alleged coordination with the Russian government during the 2016 election, the House of Representatives impeaching him in December 2019 for abuse of power and obstruction of Congress after he solicited Ukraine to investigate Joe Biden (he was acquitted by the Senate in February 2020), his family separation policy for migrants apprehended at the U.S.–Mexico border, limitations on the number of immigrants permitted from certain countries (many of which were Muslim-majority), demand for the federal funding of the Mexico–United States border wall that resulted in the longest federal government shutdown in U.S. history, withdrawal from the Iran nuclear deal, withdrawal from the Paris Accords, attempts to repeal the Affordable Care Act (ACA), and loosening of the enforcement of numerous environmental regulations.

His re-election loss to Biden came amidst a series of international crises, including the COVID-19 pandemic and resulting recession, and protests and riots following the police murder of George Floyd. In the aftermath of the election, Trump repeatedly made false claims that widespread electoral fraud had occurred and that only he had legitimately won the election. (Note: Attributed to multiple references:) Although most resulting lawsuits were either dismissed or ruled against by numerous courts, (Note: Attributed to multiple references:) Trump nonetheless conspired with his campaign team to submit documents in several states (all of which had been won by Biden) which falsely claimed to be legitimate electoral votes for President Trump and Vice President Mike Pence. (Note: Attributed to multiple references:) After the submission of these documents, the Trump campaign intended that the presiding officer of the United States Senate, either President of the Senate Pence or President pro tempore Chuck Grassley, would claim to have the unilateral power to reject electors during the January 6, 2021 vote counting session; the presiding officer would reject all electors from the several states in which the Trump campaign had submitted false documents, leaving 232 votes for Trump and 222 votes for Biden, thereby overturning the election results in favour of Trump. (Note: Attributed to multiple references:) The plans for January 6 failed to come to fruition after Pence refused to follow the campaign's proposals. (Note: Attributed to multiple references:) Trump nevertheless urged his supporters on January 6, 2021, to march to the Capitol while the joint session of Congress was assembled there to count electoral votes and formalize Biden's victory, leading to hundreds storming the building and interrupting the electoral vote count; as a result, the House impeached Trump for incitement of insurrection on January 13, 2021, making him the only federal officeholder in American history to be impeached twice. The Senate would later acquit him for the second time on February 13, 2021, after he had already left office. Once Biden was inaugurated on January 20, 2021, the Republican Party would lose control of the presidency in addition to falling short of a majority in the House and Senate.

== Venue ==
Trump delivered his recorded address in the Blue Room of the White House.

== Speech ==
The speech was reminiscent of Trump's campaign stump speech, emphasizing the highlights of his term in office. He wished incoming President Biden well (without directly mentioning his name), noting that the success and security of the country depended on his success as leader, while also implicitly warning Biden not to change or reverse some of his own policies upon taking over. Trump closed the speech on an optimistic note, stating his belief that his Make America Great Again movement was only just beginning, espousing confidence that it will continue to be a force in American politics. In doing so, he again suggested interest in either running for president again in 2024 himself or choosing a successor to run in his position. Nearly two years after leaving office, Trump officially announced his candidacy for president in 2024, on November 15, 2022. Trump became the Republican presidential nominee on July 15, 2024, and was elected to a second non-consecutive term as the 47th president of the United States on November 6, 2024. Trump is expected to give a second farewell address sometime before the end of his second presidency on January 20, 2029.

== See also ==
- Barack Obama's farewell address
- Joe Biden's farewell address
