= Farewell speech =

Speech given by an individual leaving a position or place

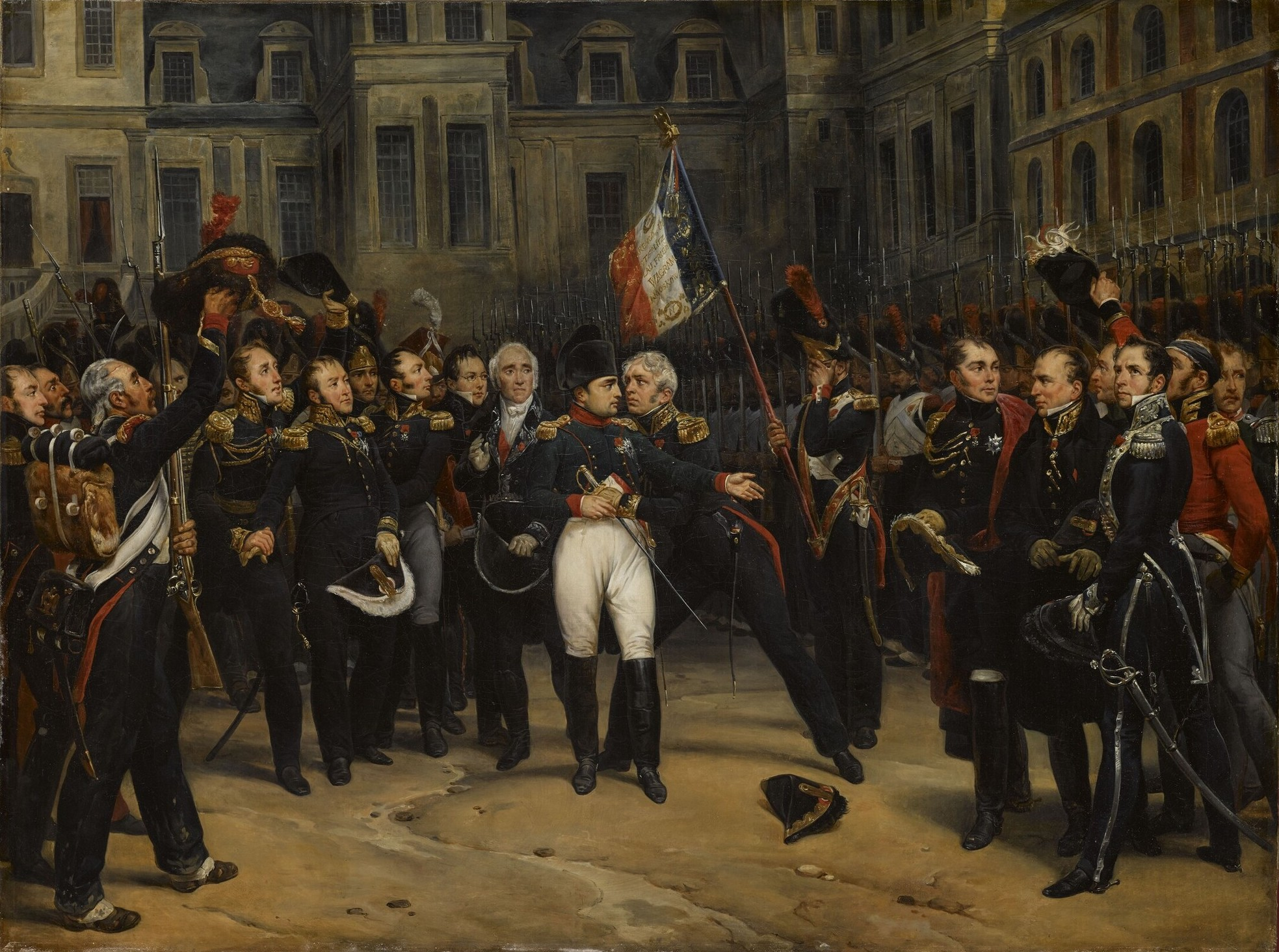
Napoleon saying farewell to the Old Guard at the Palace of Fontainebleau, after his first abdication (1814)

A farewell speech or farewell address is a speech given by an individual leaving a position or place. They are often used by public figures such as politicians as a capstone to the preceding career, or as statements delivered by persons relating to reasons for their leaving. The term is often used as a euphemism for "retirement speech," though it is broader in that it may include geographical or even biological conclusion.

In the Classics, a term for a dignified and poetic farewell speech is apobaterion (ἀποβατήριον), standing opposed to the epibaterion, the corresponding speech made upon arrival.

== U.S. presidential farewell addresses ==
Many U.S. presidential speeches have been given the moniker "farewell address" since George Washington's address in 1796. Some notable examples:

- George Washington – Washington's Farewell Address in which he warned of the dangers of political parties and foreign alliances.
- Dwight D. Eisenhower – Eisenhower's farewell address in which he warned of the military–industrial complex.
- Barack Obama – Obama's farewell address made from Chicago, breaking tradition of holding one in the White House.
- Donald Trump – Trump's first farewell address, delivered as a recorded, online video message from the White House.
- Joe Biden – Biden's farewell address in which he warned of the tech–industrial complex.

== Other notable farewell speeches ==
- Muhammad – Farewell Sermon, 6 March 632.
- The speech of Aeneas to Helenus and Andromache, Aeneid, Book III.
- Napoleon Bonaparte – First abdication, April 6, 1814 (see Treaty of Fontainebleau (1814)).
- Napoleon Bonaparte – Farewell to the Old Guard, April 20, 1814.
- Napoleon Bonaparte – Second abdication, June 22, 1815 (see Abdication of Napoleon, 1815).
- Abraham Lincoln – Farewell address to the people of Springfield, Illinois before departing to be inaugurated as President of the United States.
- Robert E. Lee – Farewell address to the Army of Northern Virginia, the day after the end of the American Civil War.
- Douglas MacArthur – farewell speeches before Congress and U.S. Military Academy; "old soldiers never die, they only fade away" and "duty, honor, country".
- Salvador Allende - Issued a farewell speech during the 1973 Chilean coup.
