= Lincoln High School (Yonkers, New York) =

School in New York State, U.S.

Coordinates: 40.921559°N 73.87416°W

- 375 Kneeland Avenue; Yonkers, New York 10704; United States

Information
- Type: Public High School
- Motto: We Care... We Learn... We Lead
- School district: Yonkers Public Schools
- Principal: Ian Sherman
- Staff: 71.58 (FTE)
- Grades: 9-12
- Enrollment: 1,103 (2022–2023)
- Student to teacher ratio: 15.41
- Colors: Purple & white
- Athletics: Lincoln Lancers
- Mascot: Lancer
- Website: www.yonkerspublicschools.org/lincoln

Lincoln High School is located in Yonkers, New York. It is one of the seven public high schools in the city and has an enrollment of about 1200 students. The front portion of the building was opened in 1953 as Southeast Yonkers Jr., Sr. High School with grades six through eight. It was completed in 1955 and renamed Lincoln Junior-Senior High School the following year. After the first year, sixth grade was dropped and ninth grade added and when the building was completed it became Lincoln Junior-Senior High School, enrolling grades seven through twelve. In the 1970s, the junior high grades were sequentially eliminated and the school became a four-year, grade nine to twelve, high school. Some members of the class of 1976 went to the school for grades seven to twelve (the last class to do so). It was not named for United States President Abraham Lincoln. The school was named Lincoln High School after the Lincoln Park area of Yonkers where it is located. The first graduating class, which went continuously from sixth grade to 12th grade, graduated in 1960. A very high percentage of that class went on to college and several of its graduates returned to Lincoln as teachers. The school colors are purple and white. Its mascot is a knight holding a lance, and its athletic teams are known as the Lincoln Lancers. Both colors and mascot were chosen by the class of 1960.

== Academy of Finance ==
The Academy of Finance is a specialized high school program that prepares students for careers in the financial services industry through coursework and on-the-job experience. Because of growth in the financial services industry, many firms face an overwhelming need for more qualified employees. The Academy of Finance at Lincoln High School, in partnership with the Yonkers Chamber of Commerce, works to fill local employment needs by preparing students for careers in the financial services industry. Developed in 1982 by American Express and the New York Public Schools, the program was initiated in Yonkers in 1989.

Academy students complete a four-year curriculum that includes courses in: computer technology, word processing/spread sheets/database design, PowerPoint presentations/web page design, accelerated accounting, economics, e-commerce, entrepreneurship, financial planning, banking and credit, public speaking, college electives, and insurance.

Additionally, students learn office dress codes and etiquette, resume preparation, and interview skills.

In 2009–2010, The academy graduated 44 seniors who were awarded over $2.5 million in scholarships.

=== Academy of Finance Advisory Board ===
Lincoln High School's Academy of Finance has an advisory board whose mission is to sustain and support the development of Yonkers' youth in their quest for personal and academic success in high school, in higher education, and throughout their career. The advisory board consists of corporate personnel, representatives from institutions of higher learning, representatives from community-based non-profits, local and regional government representatives, and small-business owners and employees who offer supplemental resources to the academy. The advisory board provides classroom speakers, mentors, job-shadowing venues, funding for programs, and paid internships for Academy students.

== Arts Academy ==
The Arts Academy offers majors in instrumental music, vocal music, stagecraft, and visual arts. Students have the opportunity to learn from renowned visiting artists as well as participate in activities at performing art centers such as the Manhattan Theater Club, the Lincoln Center Institute, and S.U.N.Y. Purchase. The faculty of the Arts Academy all have a background as professional performers and artists as well as having strong academic backgrounds. Students from the Arts Academy demonstrated their excellence by winning 7 National Gold Awards in a competition held in Nashville, Tennessee.

== Science Research Academy ==
The Science Research academy is an academy in Lincoln High School which specializes in science related topics.

== Pre-Teaching and Educational Services Academy ==
In the Pre-Teaching and Educational Services Academy, college-bound students are prepared for post-secondary study that can lead to professional certification in teaching, psychology, social work, counseling, and related fields. Students study both traditional and Montessori teaching methods using state-of-the-art technology and electronic information systems. In addition, practical training experiences during the school year and paid summer internships and mentoring are offered in collaboration with local colleges, universities, and The Lincoln Center for the Performing Arts. There is also an affiliation with “Today’s Students, Tomorrow’s Teachers” program which mentors students through college to prepare them for future careers in teaching.

== Notable alumni ==
- Lloyd J. Dumas, economist
- Lovette George (class of 1979), actress
- Dustin Hogue, basketball player
- Jerry Mander (class of 1953), activist and writer
