= Last Supper (defense industry) =

1993 dinner at The Pentagon

Figure showing rapid consolidation of military contractors into five major companies after the Cold War

The "Last Supper" was a July 21, 1993, dinner at The Pentagon attended by representatives of major United States defense contractors to discuss industry consolidation in the wake of plans to decrease defense spending after the end of the Cold War. Hosted by then-U.S. Secretary of Defense Les Aspin and Deputy Secretary of Defense William Perry, representatives were told the US government expected to be unable to support the existing number of firms in the industry, and that projections indicated only a few in each sector would survive upcoming budget cuts. The name was coined by Norm Augustine, then the head of Martin Marietta and an attendee at the dinner.

The number of major defense contractors in the U.S. would decline from 51 to 5 in the following years, consolidating the industry into the "Big Five" by 1997. These were Lockheed Martin, Raytheon, Boeing, General Dynamics, and Northrop Grumman, who, as of 2023, remain the top five contractors of the U.S. federal government. Although defense spending did decrease slightly in the early 90s, spending would later continue to rise steadily after 2001 and the September 11 attacks. The consolidation thus resulted in the "Big Five" military contractors to grow far larger than they would have without consolidation, leading to monopoly and antitrust concerns in the modern day.

== Background ==
The recent end of the Cold War had raised calls for a peace dividend, which prompted the government under George H. W. Bush and later Bill Clinton to begin reducing defense spending, resulting in a decline of about 15% from 1991 to 1996. Thus, even before 1993, steady acquisitions of declining firms by larger ones had begun to occur.

The "Last Supper" took place early on in Bill Clinton's administration, as a signal to defense contractors that the government would not pursue antitrust action against mergers and acquisitions in the industry. The stated expectation of the government was that the industry would contract, causing smaller firms to close and larger ones to consolidate, and that the government would not interfere. Informing the representatives was intended, along with ensuring the decline of spending was controlled, to avoid the associated postwar recession that was typical of the ends of other wars, such as after World War II.

== Subsequent events ==
Consolidation proceeded quickly after 1993, and by 1997 the "Big Five" consolidations were already complete. At this point monopoly concerns had begun to emerge, especially after an announcement by Lockheed Martin to acquire Northrop Grumman in July 1997, which would create a firm that controlled 25% of the Department of Defense's procurement budget. Furthermore, although defense spending had decreased by 15% since 1991, the number of major contractors had declined from 51 to 5, more than 90%, representing a significant concentration of revenue.

Norman Augustine, CEO of Lockheed Martin until April 1997, cited the replacement of Secretary of Defense William Perry by William Cohen to have marked a significant change in government attitude to the consolidation it had previously allowed. The Lockheed Martin acquisition of Northrop Grumman was blocked in 1998, and further consolidation slowed down afterwards.

== See also ==
- Military–industrial complex
