= Ralph E. Williams =

American veteran and personal aide

Ralph E. Williams (October 21, 1917 - September 4, 2009) was born at Pecos, Texas and earned a B.B.A. at the University of Texas at Austin in 1938.

In June 1941 Williams was commissioned an ensign in the United States Navy Reserve but would transfer to the regular active duty Navy in 1943. He was present on Ford Island, Pearl Harbor, during the Japanese attack. For the duration of World War II, Williams served in the Pacific theater at Pearl Harbor and Tarawa. In the immediate postwar period, Williams was a faculty member at the Naval War College and later served as assistant to the Chief of Naval Operations and the United States Secretary of the Navy.

From 1958 to 1961, Williams was a member of Dwight D. Eisenhower's White House staff as assistant to Eisenhower's Naval aide, Captain Evan P. Aurand. It was during this period that Williams (also working as a speechwriter) and Malcolm Moos coined the term "military-industrial complex" that Eisenhower used in his farewell address.

Following his departure from the White House, Williams was assigned to the Naval Supply Center at Pearl Harbor, where he served as comptroller until he retired in 1965 with the rank of captain. After his retirement he entered civil service and worked under the mineral resources secretary for the United States Department of the Interior. By the time he retired from public service in 1982, Williams was staff assistant to the director of the United States Geological Survey.
