= Konversiya =

Mikhail Gorbachev's economic policy

Konversiya (Cyrillic: Конверсия), Russian for "conversion" and used here in the sense of economic conversion was an economic policy initiated by Mikhail Gorbachev in the final years of the Soviet Union and which continued into the early years of post-Soviet Russia.

His aim was to divert resources and economic capacity from military production to civilian production. These measures, carried out from 1987 onwards, were only moderately successful.

Gorbachev first attempted to implement konversiya in the context of the 1987 INF Treaty and continued it in the defence budget cuts of the following year. In theory, once free of the demands of military procurement, manufacturers could spend capacity on consumer goods and other products to enhance civil society. Such a shift in production would also decrease the Soviet Union's reliance on importing such goods from Western nations. All of this assumed that manufacturers would find the switch easy and that only minimal retraining and retooling would be required to make this change. In a 1989 speech to the United Nations, Gorbachev suggested that plans for such conversion should be implemented world-wide, in parallel with arms reduction.

== Implementation ==
In practice, konversiya was not as easy as this. Defence manufacturers found themselves under-resourced to develop and manufacture new classes of goods. Furthermore, this "bottom up" approach left it to individual manufacturers to determine how to spend capacity, without taking into account broader market forces. At the same time, the Soviet government's capability to provide central planning and guidance was severely eroded. Initial challenges included deciding what exactly to produce, to whom to sell it, how to source the necessary raw materials, and how to finance new production. Additionally, the economies of defence markets are fundamentally different from consumer markets: the former is characterised by highly complex products developed largely irrespective of cost, and the latter by simple products produced cheaply.

As a result, freed-up capacity was not efficiently converted to civil production, and many products that were manufactured turned out to be economically unviable. Managers of manufacturing plants began to jokingly refer to konversiya as diversiya (диверсия, "sabotage") or konvulsiya (конвульсия, "convulsions") or talk about "falling under" konversiya in the sense of "falling under a bus".

== Konversiya in post-Soviet Russia ==
Following the dissolution of the Soviet Union, Russian government reforms from 1992 onwards exacerbated the situation by privatising large chunks of the defence industry without addressing these gaps in decision-making. Many of the newly privatised suffered because the loss of historical income impacted their ability to cover fixed costs, particularly wages. This led to a temporary freeze on privatisation on 19 August 1993.

Once privatisation recommenced in a more controlled way in 1994, manufacturers were able to convert capacity more efficiently, but by then the maligned term konversiya began to fall out of use. Notably, financial-industrial groups (финансово-промышленные группы — finansovo-promyshlennye gruppy) spontaneously arose within various industries which were able to help fill the void in manufacturing strategy left by the absence of central planning.

== Sources ==
- Cooper, Julian (1995). "Conversion Is Dead, Long Live Conversion!". Journal of Peace Research. 32 (2): 129–32. doi:10.1177/0022343395032002001.
- Sánchez-Andrés, Antonio (1995). "The transformation of the Russian defence industry". Europe-Asia Studies. 47 (8): 1269–92. doi:10.1080/09668139508412321.
- Van Metre, Lauren (1990). "Defence Conversion in the Soviet Union: Will it Succeed?". Soviet Union/Union Soviétique. 17 (3): 259–80.
