= Rise of the Red Engineers =

2009 book by Joel Andreas

Rise of the Red Engineers : The Cultural Revolution and the Origins of China's New Class
- Author: Joel Andreas
- Publisher: Stanford University Press
- Publication date: 2009

Rise of the Red Engineers : The Cultural Revolution and the Origins of China's New Class is authored by Joel Andreas, published in 2009 and published in Chinese in 2017.

== Comments ==
- Dong Guoqiang: "It is not only very wise in discussing strategies, but is also innovative in research content."
- Zheng Xiaowei: "Rise of the Red Engineers is a powerful and lucid book in the fields of Chinese studies, sociology, and comparative politics."
