= Ann Markusen =

Economist focused on arts and the military-industrial complex

- Education: Michigan State University
- Organization: University of Minnesota

Ann Markusen is Professor Emerita at the Humphrey School of Public Affairs of University of Minnesota. She as an economist focused on regional quality-of-life, arts, and development. During the early 2000s, she wrote several books about the military-industrial complex and economic conversion. She held faculty positions at Rutgers University, Northwestern University, University of California, Berkeley, and the University of Colorado. From 2010 to 2011 she held the UK Fulbright Distinguished Chair at the Glasgow School of Art.

== Bibliography ==
- DiGiovanna, Sean; Markusen, Ann (2003). From Defense to Development?. Routledge. ISBN 9780415322911.
