= Second Gilded Age =

Proposed time period of the United States

- Late 20th century – Current
Gilded Age
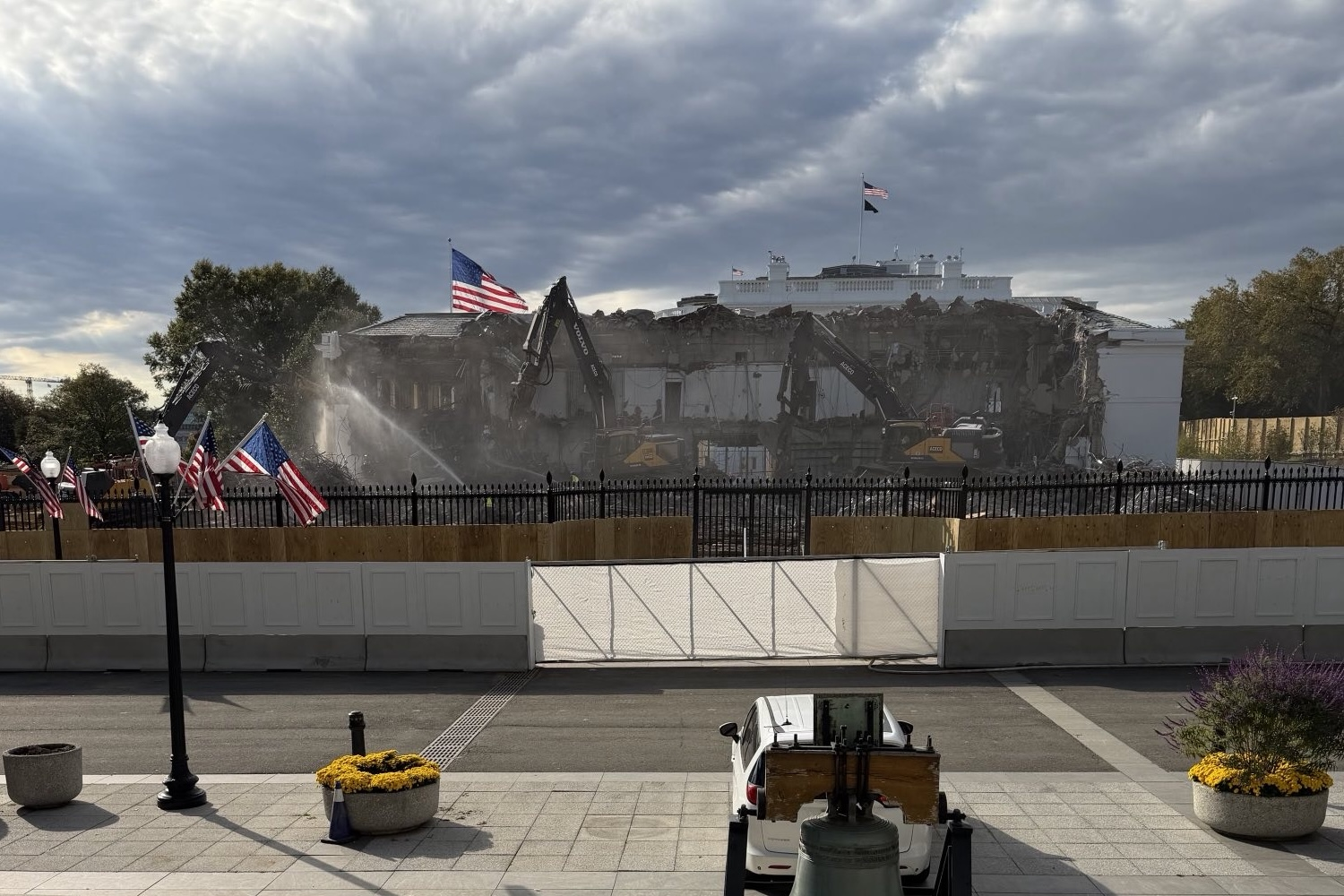
- The East Wing of the White House was demolished in October 2025.
- Location: United States
- Including: Sixth Party System: Reagan Era; Post–Cold War era; Seventh Party System
- Presidents: Ronald Reagan (1981–1989); George H. W. Bush (1989–1993); Bill Clinton (1993–2001); George W. Bush (2001–2009); Barack Obama (2009–2017); Donald Trump (2017–2021, 2025–present); Joe Biden (2021–2025)
- Key events: Junk bonds scandal; Dot-com bubble; Great Recession; We are the 99% movement; AI bubble

The Second Gilded Age is a proposed time period of United States history said to have begun between the 1980s and 2010s and continued up to the present. The Second Gilded Age is so named for its resemblance to the First Gilded Age of the 1870s to 1890s, a period marked by laissez-faire capitalism, political corruption, and wealth inequality. Historians disagree over what exact time period constitutes the Second Gilded Age, while others argue that no such period exists.

A second Gilded Age has been proposed several times, starting in the late 20th century. Proposed start times include the junk bonds scandal in the 1980s, the dot-com bubble of the 1990s, the collateralized debt obligations of the 2000s, and the 1 percent of the 2010s. These proposals largely agree that wealth inequality and political corruption are as rampant as in the First Gilded Age, due in part to the implementation of neoliberal policies. Other proposals argue that race relations and civil rights comparisons are more apparent.

Other authors dispute the characterization, arguing the similarities to the First Gilded Age are merely surface level. These authors claim that the underlying causes of the Second Gilded Age differ from those of the First Gilded Age, and thus the underlying solutions must differ as well.

== Causes ==
Economists and historians often cite shareholder primacy as one of the main factors of the Second Gilded Age. Shareholder primacy has been criticized for putting the interests of corporate owners over the needs of workers.

== Comparisons ==
=== Economics ===
According to Henry Giroux, the United States has entered a Second Gilded Age "more savage and anti-democratic than its predecessor" as a result of the implementation of neoliberalism and contemporary market fundamentalism.

Many authors draw comparisons between the obscene fortunes of Gilded Age figures such as William Randolph Hearst and Second Gilded Age figures such as Elon Musk, both men who took control of media empires to push political agendas. Where Hearst took control of newspapers, Musk took control of the platform formerly known as Twitter. Hearst and Musk have both been criticized for using their newly acquired empires to spread misinformation and antisemitism.

=== Politics ===
Business and technology decabillionaires attend a dinner hosted by Donald Trump and Melania Trump in the State Dining Room of the White House on September 4, 2025.

The Gilded Age was a time of rampant political corruption, and many authors liken it to the corruption of the modern day. "Bailout billionaires" have been accused of purchasing politicians and using dark money and super PACs to buy elections.

In his farewell address, U.S. President Joe Biden warned that an emerging American oligarchy and tech–industrial complex posed risks to America in what Politico described as "echoing Roosevelt's language in calling out the 'robber barons' of a new dystopian Gilded Age." These comments were made in the context of several tech billionaires who made large donations to the 2024 presidential campaign of Donald Trump and his second inauguration. It also came during surging stock prices of "The Magnificent Seven," a group of tech companies whose combined value rose 46% in 2024, vastly beating the S&P 500 share index.

==== Civil rights ====
Some authors have pointed out similarities between the loss of civil rights after the Reconstruction Era and the stripping of civil rights in the modern day. The Supreme Court gutted the Civil Rights Act of 1866 in 1883, just as it gutted sections of the Voting Rights Act of 1965 in 2013, in both cases helping to undermine Black Americans of the right to vote. While the legal discrimination of Jim Crow has been overturned, still today, a de facto racist criminal justice system overlooks or enables police racial discrimination. In 2025, President Donald Trump ended federal diversity, equity, and inclusion programs.

Xenophobia continued to gain legal protections in the First Gilded Age, finally culminating in the Chinese Exclusion Act in 1882, fully banning immigration from most of East and South Asia until being overturned during the civil rights era. This approach has been compared to Obama, Trump, and Biden era policies on immigration through the US–Mexico border such as Remain in Mexico. Trump further instituted travel bans from 15 countries, until they were revoked by Biden. Trump's second administration has overseen mass deportations, while the Supreme Court ruled that immigration agents in California could continue to stop and detain people based on characteristics such as race, language spoken, and occupation.

=== Public response ===
According to The New Hampshire Gazette, the response from more radical elements of the general public to the excesses of the First Gilded Age are similar to what is emerging in the Second Gilded Age with the killing of Brian Thompson, in particular the anarchist tradition of propaganda of the deed.

By contrast, labor historian Steve Fraser emphasized in his 2015 book The Age of Acquiescence that there has been a marked decline in political resistance during the Second Gilded Age. In a New York Times review of Fraser's book, Naomi Klein summarizes the author's thesis:

What fueled the resistance to the first Gilded Age, [Fraser] argues, was the fact that many Americans had a recent memory of a different kind of economic system, whether in America or back in Europe. Many at the forefront of the resistance were actively fighting to protect a way of life, whether it was the family farm that was being lost to predatory creditors or small-scale artisanal businesses being wiped out by industrial capitalism. Having known something different from their grim present, they were capable of imagining – and fighting for – a radically better future. It is this imaginative capacity that is missing from our second Gilded Age.

== Debate and discourse ==
Some authors argue that the Second Gilded Age is misnamed, and that these comparisons are unfounded or only surface-level.

The First Gilded Age coincided with America's Second Industrial Revolution, as America moved from the use of coal to being powered by oil, thanks in large part to the efforts of captains of industry such as John D. Rockefeller and Henry Ford. Some authors have argued that the Second Gilded Age remains a time of deindustrialization, as working-class wages continue to fall and workers turn to the gig economy.

Historian Julie Greene argues that while the First Gilded Age and Second Gilded Age "share certain important characteristics, these are profoundly different historical moments." She says that while during the First Gilded Age there were serious attempts to mitigate the worst excesses of the new industrial capitalism of the time, the Second Gilded Age has seen almost the exact opposite, "as capitalists and their ideological and political supporters push to see how far they can go to ensure the unchallenged hegemony of corporate and property rights." She attributes this to several factors, including the neoliberal era starting in the 1970s, the collapse of the Soviet Union, and the reform and opening up in China. Greene argues that the Soviet collapse and Chinese liberalization represented the collapse of the two biggest alternatives to capitalism. In turn, this made it easier for employers to allow fundamental rights to disappear, as workers no longer felt that they had real alternatives. She concludes ultimately that "the slow climb toward a more humane capitalism and the rapid descent away from it constitute two very different experiences."

== See also ==
- Atari Democrat
- Big Tech
- Democratic backsliding in the United States
- Epstein class
- Neoliberalism in the United States
- Reaganomics
- Second Cold War
- Trillionaires
- Wealth inequality in the United States
