= Dustin Hogue =

American basketball player (born 1992)

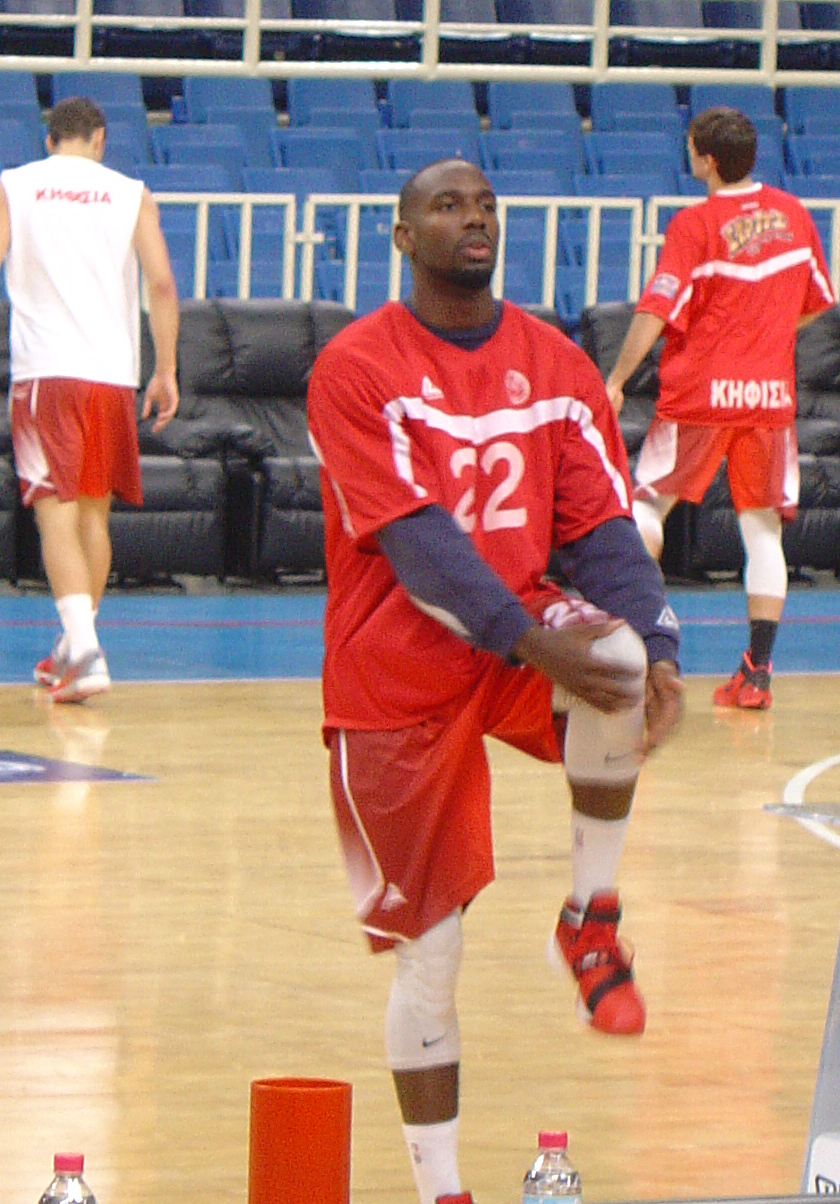
- Hogue in action with Nea Kifissia against AEK Athens in 2016

Pallacanestro Cantù
- Position: Center / power forward
- League: Serie A2

Personal information
- Born: June 30, 1992 (age 34) Yonkers, New York, U.S.
- Listed height: 6 ft 6 in (1.98 m)
- Listed weight: 220 lb (100 kg)

Career information
- High school: Lincoln (Yonkers, New York)
- College: Indian Hills CC (2011–2013); Iowa State (2013–2015)
- NBA draft: 2015: undrafted
- Playing career: 2015–present

Career history
- 2015–2016: Nea Kifissia
- 2016–2019: Dolomiti Energia Trento
- 2019–2021: BC Enisey
- 2021–2022: U-BT Cluj-Napoca
- 2022–2023: Prometey
- 2023: Promitheas Patras
- 2023–2024: Real Sebastiani Rieti
- 2024–present: Pallacanestro Cantù

Career highlights
- Romanian League champion (2022); Romanian League All-Star (2022); VTB League All-Star (2021); Greek League rebounding leader (2016)

Dustin Vidal Morgan Hogue (born June 30, 1992) is an American professional basketball player for Pallacanestro CantùPallacanestro Cantù of the Serie A2. He played college basketball for Indian Hills Community College and Iowa State Cyclones. Hogue entered the 2015 NBA draft, but was not selected in the draft's two rounds.

== High school career ==
Hogue played high school basketball at Lincoln in Yonkers, New York. He was ranked as the No. 208 player in New York.

== College career ==
=== Indian Hills ===
Hogue chose to play college basketball for Indian Hills college after finishing highschool at Lincoln High School. As a sophomore, he averaged 12.9 points and 5.4 rebounds in 25 games making 49.4 percent of his shots from the field. He was named in the Second-Team All-Region XI. His team went 24–1 in the 25 games he appeared in. As a freshman, he averaged 10.6 points and 5.7 rebounds. Indian Hills finished seventh at the NJCAA Division I national tournament in 2012.

=== Iowa State ===
As a junior, he was transferred from Indian Hills, to Iowa State University. In his first season, he played and started at all 36 games averaging 11.6 points and 8.4 rebounds being the second in the Big 12 in rebounding. Houge shot 57.3 percent from the field, including 34.4 percent from behind the arc. He was named to the NCAA Tournament All-East Region Team after scoring a career-high 34 points against Connecticut in the Sweet 16. He had his first career double-double came against No. 7 Michigan when he scored 12 points and grabbed 10 rebounds. In the 2014–15 season his numbers dipped to 9.3 points and 4.9 rebounds, but he averaged four fewer minutes of playing time. He did, however, improve his 3-point shooting during his last season from 34 percent to 43 percent. He scored in double figures 16 times this season and 37 times in his career.

== Professional career ==
After going undrafted in the 2015 NBA draft, Hogue signed with the Greek club Nea Kifissia for the 2015–16 Greek Basket League season. At the end of the full season, Hogue went on to average 12.5 points, 8.1 rebounds, 1.4 assists, and 0.9 steals in 28 games for Kifissia. He was the top rebounder of the Greek Basket League's regular season phase. During the season, Hogue scored in double figures 20 times, having also 11 double-doubles in points and rebounds.

On June 29, 2016, Hogue signed with Aquila Basket Trento for the 2016–17 season.

In July 2017, Hogue signed with Korean club Goyang Orion Orions.

In July 2017, Hogue signed with Turkish club Pınar Karşıyaka.

In November 2017, Hogue signed with Italian club Orlandina Basket. However Orlandina Basket was unable to finalize the deal with him. According to a decision taken by FIBA, Hogue was still bound with the South Korean team of Goyang Orion Orions, so he could not be registered with another organization.

On December 14, 2017, Hogue signed again with Italian club Aquila Basket Trento.

On July 29, 2019, he signed a contract with BC Enisey of the VTB United League. Hogue averaged 11 points and 6 rebounds per game. He re-signed with BC Enisey on July 16, 2020.

On July 22, 2021, he signed with U-BT Cluj-Napoca of the Romanian Liga Națională.

On July 1, 2022, he signed with Prometey of the Latvian-Estonian Basketball League.

On January 9, 2023, Hogue signed with Greek club Promitheas Patras for the rest of the season. In 14 domestic league matches, he averaged 7.7 points and 4 rebounds, playing around 19 minutes per contest.

=== College statistics ===
Year	Team	GP	GS	MPG	FG%	3P%	FT%	RPG	APG	SPG	BPG	PPG
2013–14	Iowa State	36	36	29.9	.573	.344	.664	8.4	1.0	.8	.6	11.6
2014–15	Iowa State	34	34	26.2	.557	.431	.550	4.9	1.1	.7	.3	9.3
Career		70	70	28.1	.556	.388	.617	6.7	1.1	.7	.4	10.5

== Personal life ==
Dustin is the son of Douglas and Alicia Hogue. His brother Doug Hogue played as a linebacker for the NFL's Detroit Lions, Carolina Panthers and Winnipeg Blue Bombers.

Dustin is married to Sara formally Federico the women’s head golf coach at Weber State University. They got married in July 2023. They share one daughter, Jayla.

== Career statistics ==
=== Domestic Leagues ===
==== Full season ====
Legend
GP	Games played	MPG	Minutes per game	FG%	Field goal percentage
3P%	3-point field goal percentage	FT%	Free throw percentage	RPG	Rebounds per game
APG	Assists per game	SPG	Steals per game	BPG	Blocks per game
PPG	Points per game	**Bold**	Career high		Led the league

Note: Only games in the primary domestic competitions are included. Therefore, games in cup or European competitions are left out.

Year	Team	League	GP	MPG	FG%	3P%	FT%	RPG	APG	SPG	BPG	PPG	
2015–16	(Greece) Nea Kifissia	GBL	28		30.5	.489	.273	.660	8.1	1.4	1.0	0.1	12.5
