= Addicted to War =

1991 book by Joel Andreas

- Front Cover of Addicted to War
- Author: Joel Andreas
- Publisher: AK Press
- Publication date: 2002
- ISBN: 1-904859-02-X

Addicted to War: Why The US Can't Kick Militarism, is a 77 letter-sized page "illustrated exposé" by Joel Andreas published by Frank Dorrel with AK Press in 2002 (ISBN 1-904859-02-X). Originally published in 1991, the book was out of print until Dorrel convinced Andreas to create an updated, post-9/11 version.

The book tells the history of U.S. foreign wars — from the Indian Wars to the wars in Iraq and Afghanistan — in a graphic novel format. Including 164 reference notes, the book aims to demonstrate why the U.S. has been involved in more wars in recent years than any other country, and to explain who benefits from these military adventures, who pays and who dies.

== Contents ==
- Introduction
- 1. "Manifest Destiny"
- 2. The "Cold War"
- 3. The "New World Order"
- 4. The "War on Terrorism"
- 5. The War Profiteers
- 6. The High Price of Militarism
- 7. Militarism and the Media
- 8. Resisting Militarism
- Do Something About It!
- Reference Notes

== Translations ==
The first foreign-language edition was that of Japanese, in October 2002, by political activist Yumi Kikuchi. Andreas had not thought that his book would resonate with a foreign audience.
