= Seymour Melman =

American economist (1917–2004)

Seymour Melman (December 30, 1917 – December 16, 2004) was an American professor emeritus of industrial engineering and operations research at Columbia University's Fu Foundation School of Engineering and Applied Science.

He wrote extensively for fifty years on economic conversion, the ordered transition from military to civilian production by military industries and facilities. Author of The Permanent War Economy and Pentagon Capitalism, he was an economist, writer, and gadfly of the military-industrial complex.

== Biography ==
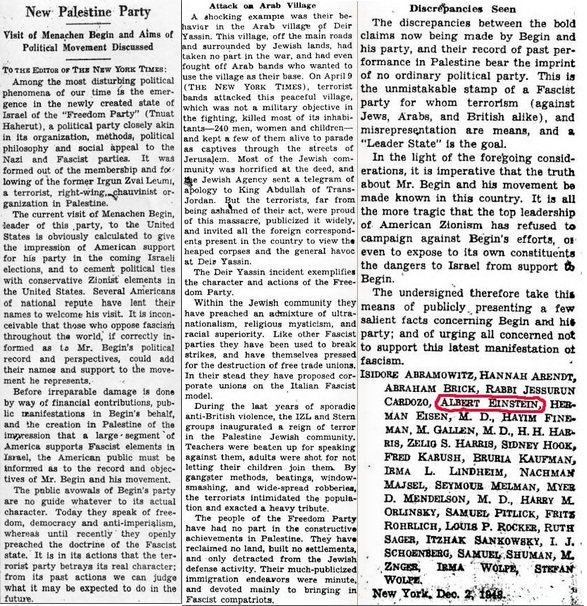
Albert Einstein, Seymour Melman and others letter

Seymour Melman was born in New York City on December 30, 1917. He studied at the De Witt Clinton High School in the Bronx and received his undergraduate degree from the City College of New York in 1939. After graduation he received a travel fellowship and traveled to Palestine and Europe between 1939 and 1940.

Upon returning to the United States he served for two years as the secretary of the Student Zionist Federation. Soon after the attack on Pearl Harbor, he served in the US Army as a First Lieutenant in the Coast Artillery Corps. Afterwards he served on the National Industrial Conference Board. He became a graduate student at Columbia University in January 1945 and received his Ph.D. in economics in June 1949. He joined the Columbia faculty that year and was a popular instructor until he retired from teaching in 2003.

Melman was the former President of the Association for Evolutionary Economics, Vice President of the New York Academy of Sciences, co-chair of SANE (Committee for a Sane Nuclear Policy), chair of The National Commission for Economic Conversion and Disarmament, and a participant in the Reindustrialization of the United States Project.

In 1976 SANE's New York City conference on "The Arms Race and the Economic Crisis" featured Melman, and won an economic conversion plank in the Democratic party platform.

Melman died in his Manhattan home of an aneurysm on December 16, 2004.

== Work ==
Melman was part of a circle of intellectuals with epicenters in various networks. He was associated with the Frame of Reference group led by University of Pennsylvania Professor Zellig Harris, which culminated in Harris's posthumous book The transformation of capitalist society. He also fraternized with a group of scholars at Columbia University that included the sociologist Robert S. Lynd. And he was connected to a wide network of national and international scholars and activists concerned with disarmament, economic conversion and economic democracy, including Noam Chomsky, Marcus Raskin, Harley Shaiken, John Ullmann, Lloyd J. Dumas, and John Kenneth Galbraith, among many others.

He was also on the advisory board of FFIPP-USA (Faculty for Israeli-Palestinian Peace-USA), a network of Palestinian, Israeli, and International faculty, and students, working in for an end of the Israeli occupation of Palestinian territories and a just peace.

The legacy of Seymour Melman's work continues in a fellowship and research program supported by the Institute for Policy Studies in Washington, D.C. and through the work of his former colleagues in the Economic Reconstruction network.

=== Quotations ===
"The joy of accomplishing production. It's a great thing. The work I've been doing now for some time is writing an article, writing a book, or researching something. It's an accomplishment. It's a great thing. No, more exactly, it's living. It's being alive. To be productive is to be alive."

"A bomb equivalent to 20 million tons of TNT would cause an intense fire called a 'fire storm' in an area about 2,000 square miles (5,200 km^{2}) around the area of the blast. And in such an area it would be futile, desperately futile to construct what are called 'fallout shelters'".

== Publications ==
- 1956. Dynamic factors in industrial productivity. New York, Wiley.
- 1958. Decision Making and Productivity.
- 1958. Inspection for Disarmament. Editor.
- 1961. The Peace Race.
- 1962. No Place to Hide Fallout Shelters-Fact and Fiction. Editor.
- 1962. Disarmament; Its Politics And Economics. Editor.
- 1965. Our Depleted Society
- 1968. In the name of America; the conduct of the war in Vietnam by the armed forces of the United States as shown by published reports, compared with the laws of war binding on the United States Government and on its citizens. With Melvyn Baron and Dodge Ely. New York: Clergy.
- 1970. The defense economy; conversion of industries and occupations to civilian needs. New York: Praeger.
- 1970. Pentagon Capitalism: The Political Economy of War. New York: McGraw-Hill.
- 1971. The war economy of the United States; readings on military industry and economy. New York: St. Martin's Press.
- 1983. Profits without Production.
- 1985. The Permanent War Economy: American Capitalism in Decline NY: Simon & Schuster.
- 1988. The Demilitarized Society: Disarmament & Conversion. Montreal: Harvest House.
- 1992. Rebuilding America: A New Economic Plan for the 1990s. Westfield NJ: Open Media.
- 2001. After Capitalism: From Managerialism to Workplace Democracy. New York: Knopf.

== See also ==
- Military-industrial complex
