= Dwight D. Eisenhower's farewell address =

1961 speech by U.S. President Dwight D. Eisenhower

Dwight D. Eisenhower's Farewell Address
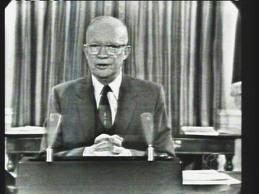
- President Dwight Eisenhower delivers his farewell address
- Date: January 17, 1961
- Location: Oval Office, White House, Washington, D.C.
- Type: Farewell address
- Theme: The dangers of the military–industrial complex, the balance of government programs, and long-term national security
- Filmed by: Nationwide television networks (CBS, NBC, ABC)
- Participants: Dwight D. Eisenhower
- Outcome: Popularized the term "military–industrial complex" and serves as a foundational warning on corporate-military influence in American politics

The final public speech of Dwight D. Eisenhower as the 34th president of the United States was delivered in a television broadcast on January 17, 1961. Best known for advocating that the nation guard against the potential influence of the military–industrial complex, the speech also expressed concerns about planning for the future and the dangers of massive spending, especially deficit spending, the prospect of the domination of science through federal funding and, conversely, the domination of science-based public policy by what he called a "scientific-technological elite". Eisenhower played a significant role in the creation of this "elite" and its position of power, and thus there is an element of irony in his warning against it. This speech and Eisenhower's Chance for Peace speech have been called the "bookends" of his administration.

== Background ==
Eisenhower served as president for two full terms from January 1953 to January 1961, and was the first U.S. president to be term-limited from seeking re-election again. He had overseen a period of considerable economic expansion, even as the Cold War deepened. Three of his national budgets had been balanced, but spending pressures mounted. Eisenhower's New Look policy, based around a high-technology strategy, played a significant role in expanding the size of the defense research industry. The recent presidential election had resulted in the election of John F. Kennedy, and the oldest American president in a century was about to hand the reins of power to the youngest elected president.

A draft speech that Eisenhower planned to deliver in 1958, but abandoned, focused on the same theme of balanced military spending as in his eventual farewell address. The draft focused on the "lack of stability in defensive strength" meaning that defense spending goes through fads of exorbitant spending and starvation driven by cycles of fear and apathy.

== The speech ==
Eisenhower's farewell address, January 17, 1961. Length 15:30.

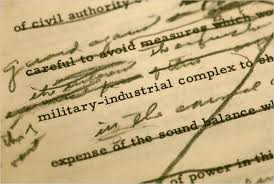
A draft of the farewell address, showing handwritten edits.

As early as 1959, Eisenhower began working with his brother Milton and his speechwriters, including his chief speechwriter Malcolm Moos, to develop his final statement as he left public life. It went through at least 21 drafts. The speech was "a solemn moment in a decidedly unsolemn time", warning a nation "giddy with prosperity, infatuated with youth and glamour, and aiming increasingly for the easy life."

As we peer into society's future, we – you and I, and our government – must avoid the impulse to live only for today, plundering for our own ease and convenience the precious resources of tomorrow. We cannot mortgage the material assets of our grandchildren without risking the loss also of their political and spiritual heritage. We want democracy to survive for all generations to come, not to become the insolvent phantom of tomorrow.

Despite his military background and being the only general to be elected president in the 20th century, he warned the nation with regard to the corrupting influence of what he describes as the "military–industrial complex".

Until the latest of our world conflicts, the United States had no armaments industry. American makers of plowshares could, with time and as required, make swords as well. But we can no longer risk emergency improvisation of national defense. We have been compelled to create a permanent armaments industry of vast proportions. Added to this, three and a half million men and women are directly engaged in the defense establishment. We annually spend on military security alone more than the net income of all United States corporations.

Now this conjunction of an immense military establishment and a large arms industry is new in the American experience. The total influence—economic, political, even spiritual—is felt in every city, every Statehouse, every office of the Federal government. We recognize the imperative need for this development. Yet, we must not fail to comprehend its grave implications. Our toil, resources, and livelihood are all involved. So is the very structure of our society.

In the councils of government, we must guard against the acquisition of unwarranted influence, whether sought or unsought, by the military-industrial complex. The potential for the disastrous rise of misplaced power exists and will persist. We must never let the weight of this combination endanger our liberties or democratic processes. We should take nothing for granted. Only an alert and knowledgeable citizenry can compel the proper meshing of the huge industrial and military machinery of defense with our peaceful methods and goals, so that security and liberty may prosper together.

=== Scientific-technological elite ===
He also expressed his concomitant concern for corruption of the scientific process as part of this centralization of funding in the Federal government, and vice versa:

Akin to, and largely responsible for the sweeping changes in our industrial-military posture, has been the technological revolution during recent decades.

In this revolution, research has become central, it also becomes more formalized, complex, and costly. A steadily increasing share is conducted for, by, or at the direction of, the Federal government.

The prospect of domination of the nation's scholars by Federal employment, project allocation, and the power of money is ever present and is gravely to be regarded.

Yet in holding scientific discovery in respect, as we should, we must also be alert to the equal and opposite danger that public policy could itself become the captive of a scientific-technological elite.

== Legacy ==
Although it was much broader, Eisenhower's speech is remembered primarily for its reference to the military-industrial complex. The phrase gained acceptance during the Vietnam War era. The speech has been adapted as an oratory for orchestra and orator. Footage of the speech is featured in the opening of the 1991 film JFK.

In 2025, President Joe Biden invoked the "military-industrial complex" phrasing from Eisehower's address in his own farewell address, saying that he was "concerned about the potential rise of a tech-industrial complex that could pose real dangers for our country."
