= Lloyd J. Dumas =

American macroeconomist (born 1945)

Lloyd Jeff Dumas (born May 18, 1945) is a professor of Political Economy, Economics, and Public Policy at the School of Economic, Political and Policy Sciences at the University of Texas at Dallas.

Dumas' focus areas include the economics of peace, economic conversion, the macroeconomics of military spending, climate change and economic solutions, human reliability regarding dangerous technologies, economic development and international economic consultancy accountability.

Dumas has published more than 120 works in eleven languages in books and journals on economics, engineering, sociology, history, public policy, philosophy, military studies and peace science. He has been quoted as an authority by Time, Business Week, Science, Der Spiegel, Chicago Tribune, Christian Science Monitor, and the Washington Post (not an exhaustive list). His extensive publications include those found in newspapers/magazines, including the New York Times, Los Angeles Times, International Herald Tribune, Boston Globe, Technology Review, Defense News, Dallas Morning News and the Baltimore Sun, and the International Herald Tribune. Among numerous radio interviews, he has appeared more than once on KERA's (90.1 FM) think with Krys Boyd.

== Biography ==
Dumas was born in Yonkers, New York, on May 18, 1945. He studied at Lincoln High School in Yonkers and received his undergraduate and graduate degrees from Columbia University. He received a B.A. in Mathematics in 1967, an M.S. in Industrial Engineering in 1968 and a Ph.D. in Economics in 1972. He taught economics at the City University of New York and industrial and management engineering at Columbia University before moving to Dallas, Texas, where he is on the faculty in the School of Economics, Political and Policy Science at UT-Dallas.

Like his mentor, Seymour Melman, Professor Dumas has committed his career to studying the effects of military/defense spending on the economy. He has served on the boards of SANE (Committee for a Sane Nuclear Policy) and Economists for Peace and Security.

== Work ==
=== Books ===
His books include Lethal Arrogance: Human Fallibility and Dangerous Technologies (New York: St. Martin's Press/Palgrave Macmillan, December 1999); The Socio-Economics of Conversion: From War to Peace (New York: M.E. Sharpe, Inc., 1995); Making Peace Possible: The Promise of Economic Conversion (Oxford: Pergamon Press, 1989); and The Overburdened Economy: Uncovering the Causes of Chronic Unemployment, Inflation and National Decline (Berkeley: University of California Press, 1986). Forthcoming books include The Peacekeeping Economy, scheduled to be released in the Winter of 2011 by Yale University Press.

=== Public speaking ===
Dumas has spoken at more than 250 conferences and special lectures since 1980, including symposia sponsored by the Sandia National Laboratories, the Los Alamos National Laboratory, the U.S. Department of State, the United Nations, the World Bank and the Russian Academy of Sciences (at that time, the "Soviet Academy of Sciences"), as well as professional meetings of economists, sociologists, political scientists, physicists, engineers, historians, physicians, management scientists, teachers, labor unions and members of Congress. He has addressed the United Nations, testified at city, state and federal government hearings, and discussed the policy implications of his work on more than 300 TV and radio programs in the U.S., former Soviet Union, Canada, Europe and the Pacific. From 1991–93, he was Vice Chair of the Governor's Task Force on Economic Transition of the State of Texas.

=== Economic Impacts of the Department of Energy on the State of New Mexico ===
He has analyzed the effects of federal government spending for "a Nuclear Watch of New Mexico project to evaluate the Department of Energy's (DOE) economic impact on the state of New Mexico" (p. 1).

=== University of New Mexico ===
While on a one-semester sabbatical from UT-Dallas in Fall 1997, he held the Garrey Carruthers Distinguished Chair in the Honors Program at the University of New Mexico in Albuquerque. While at UNM-Albuquerque, he gave numerous public talks and seminars for faculty.

=== Other work ===
Other areas of his work include accountability issues about economic advisors' behavior in international economic development. Together with Janine Wedel, he organized and chaired the conference and working group "Building Accountability into International Economic Development Advising" in Pułtusk, Poland (September 21–24, 2003). A related monograph, co-authored by Janine Wedel and Greg Callman, titled "Confronting Corruption, Building Accountability: Lessons From the World of International Development Advising," will be published by Palgrave in 2010.

Organizations with which Dumas has collaborated or for which he has made contributions include the Swedish Chapter of International Physicians for the Prevention of Nuclear War (Swedish: Svenska Lakäre mot Kernvapen (SLMK)), Physicians for Social Responsibility, and Nuclear Watch of New Mexico. On more than one occasion, Professor Dumas spoke at meetings organized by SLMK, for example, at meetings held in Moscow with the Russian Foreign Ministry, the Rosatom (Russian: Росатом)—at that time, the Ministry for Atomic Energy of the Russian Federation (Russian: Министерство по атомной энергии Российской Федерации), or MinAtom (МинАтом), and the Russian Duma (Russian Parliament).

His work has received noteworthy attention from notable persons such as Amitai Etzioni, Professor Kosta Tsipis of the Massachusetts Institute of Technology, the late Kenneth Boulding, John Kenneth Galbraith, Jan Tinbergen (Nobel Laureate in Economics), and Retired USN Rear Admiral Eugene Carroll. Etzioni was the Series Editor for the series "Studies in Socio-Economics," a culmination of research presented at the International Society for the Advancement of Socio-Economics. A book edited by Dumas, The Socio-Economics of Conversion from War to Peace, was included in the series. (See Publications for a complete citation for this book.)

Of Dumas' contribution to macroeconomic theory, Kenneth Boulding wrote in the preface to Dumas' book, The Overburdened Economy, "This is a very important book. ... Lloyd Dumas has challenged one of the implicit assumptions of the Keynesian Revolution ... the assumption that all activity which is paid for must be productive. His questioning of this assumption may well set off a reorganization of the economic information system ... Dumas's work is a very valuable contribution to the coming transformation of economic thought" (p. xi). In praise of the same book (see blurbs or dust jacket), Galbraith wrote "This is a book of real substance by a scholar of high competence. ... I urge for it and for Professor Dumas the attention they both deserve." and Jan Tinbergen wrote "[The Overburdened Economy] throws much light on the problem of the deceleration of economic growth of both the USA and the Soviet Union."

== Publications ==
=== Books ===
- The Peacekeeping Economy: Using economic relationships to build a more peaceful, prosperous, and secure world (Yale University Press, 2011).
- The Technology Trap: Where human error and malevolence meet powerful technologies (Greenwood Press, 2010).
- Lethal Arrogance: Human Fallibility and Dangerous Technologies (New York: St. Martin's Press/Palgrave, December 1999)
- The Overburdened Economy: Uncovering the Causes of Chronic Unemployment, Inflation and National Decline, preface by Kenneth Boulding, former President of the American Economics Association. (Berkeley: University of California Press, 1986)
- The Conservation Response: Strategies for the design and operation of energy-using systems, Lexington Books, 1976.

=== Edited volumes ===
- The Socio-Economics of Conversion: From War to Peace, preface by Amitai Etzioni, President, American Sociological Association (New York: M.E. Sharpe, Inc., 1995). Editor and contributor.
- Making Peace Possible: The Promise of Economic Conversion (Oxford: Pergamon Press, 1989). Edited with Marek Thee; author of the first and last chapters.
