= Economic conversion =

Process of moving from military to civilian markets

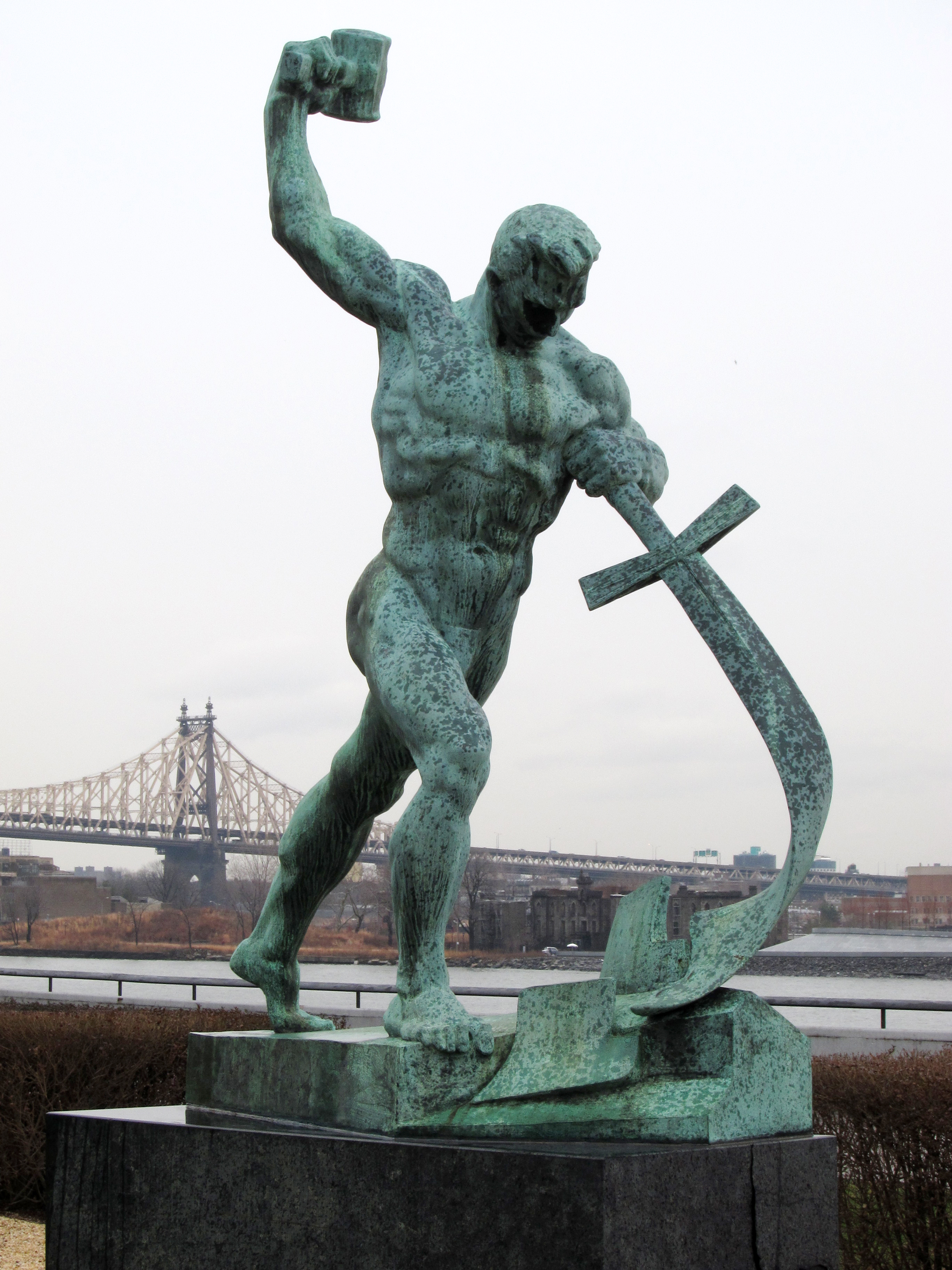
Let Us Beat Swords into Plowshares in the United Nations garden (1957)

Economic conversion, defence conversion, or arms conversion, is a technical, economic and political process for moving from military to civilian markets. Economic conversion takes place on several levels and can be applied to different organizations. In terms of levels (roughly corresponding to geographic scales), conversion can take place at the level of new innovation projects, divisions within multi-divisional firms, companies, and national economies. In terms of objects, conversion can govern workers (i.e. retraining), firms (in terms of workers, capital, facilities and real estate) and land (in terms of real estate). Some of these scales obviously overlap. Organizations that can be converted include defense firms, military bases, and defense laboratories.

Conversion should be distinguished from economic diversification although the two processes overlap. Conversion involves the maximum reuse of military committed resources, with the emphasis on reuse of existing personnel. The key personnel within defense firms are engineers and factory workers, and managers skilled in managing innovations. Another key emphasis in conversion is in the area of new product development. Diversification can involve financial manipulation, e.g. in purchasing new firms, which leaves in place existing commitments to military production. Sometimes however, economic conversion requires purchase of another firm to supply "complementary capacities." Generally, conversion can be supported by various factors that help defense firms overcome specialization.

== History context ==
Among the key periods associated with economic conversion have been the postwar conversion after World War II, numerous experiments in diversification (with conversion of defense engineers' skills) in the period after the Vietnam War in the 1970s, and similar efforts after the Cold War. Various militarist and corporate critics battled labor and peace advocates during these conversion openings, with the former usually winning the day.

During the '50s, Western citizens and policymakers were impressed by the extensive impact on everyday life of civilian applications derived from military technologies, which were developed during the last years of World War II. This happened within an institutional framework in which military and civilian Research and Development activities were separated, and the allocation of public and private resources was primarily addressed towards the military needs and the priorities of national security systems.

Since the 1960s, the military (deficit) spending was followed in Western countries by a large debate on the conversion from military to civilian industrial and technological activities. Two decades later, the issue on what was the existing hierarchy between the military and civilian R&D, was widely overcome by the concept of “dual-use” technologies, suggesting that military industrial firms and their products could be somewhere used for civilian purposes, and vice versa.

Conversion (Russian: Конверсия — Konversiya) became a deliberate economic strategy of Mikhail Gorbachev in the final years of the Soviet Union, as he pursued large decreases in military spending. This was not particularly effective during his time in office, but saw better results in post-Soviet Russia.

Since the beginning of the Clinton's presidency in 1993, the American hi-tech companies were allowed to export a wide range of their products all over the world without prior Government approval. The new trade policies fostered the interchange with China, but ignored their long-term impact for national security and the need of intelligence agencies and government officials to track how those technologies were effectively used and to avoid them be improperly diverted to terrorist or foreign military uses.

In the contemporary period, from the late 1990s to the present day (circa 2010) the prospects for conversion have been constrained by regional conflicts, the so-called "war on terror", and consolidation within the defense industry through mergers, acquisitions and regional production networks. These barriers have decreased the incentives to shift into civilian markets for various firms, except for those more on the periphery of defense acquisition. Nevertheless, the potential debate over mega military systems like specific jet fighter programs or Trident (in the U.K.) as well as an overall climate of fiscal austerity might pressure or encourage some military firms to go civilian. Arms control agreements related to nuclear weapons might also lower the projected demand for some military suppliers. Ultimately, the extension of civilian markets for defense firms might be encouraged by building up the demand for civilian industrial markets like mass transit, alternative energy and sustainable, civilian infrastructure.

== Modern thought ==
In modern times, a key figure in promoting the idea of economic conversion was the late Seymour Melman (1917–2004), a professor at Columbia University in the United States. In recent times, the idea has also been promoted by various scholars and activists, particularly during the 1980s and 1990s, in Europe, the United States, Israel and South Africa. Following the end of the Cold War, great attention was placed on the prospects for economic conversion.

Regarding differences in the 1970s and the postwar era, Seymour Melman noted that: "The problem of conversion from military to civilian work is fundamentally different now from the problem that existed after World War II. At that time, the issue was reconversion; the firms could and did go back to doing the work they had been involved in before the war. They could literally draw the olds sets of blueprints and tools from the shelf and go to work on the old products. At the present time, the bulk of military production is concentrated in industries, firms, or plants that have been specialized for this work, and frequently have no prior history of civilian work" (The Defense Economy, 1970: 7).

Detailed empirical studies conducted by Seymour Melman, John Ullmann, Lloyd J. Dumas, Catherine Hill, Greg Bischak, Ann Markusen, Michael Oden, Jonathan Michael Feldman, and others have shown the technical or economic viability of economic conversion. After the September 11, 2001 attacks and concentrated political power directed towards military-serving interests, the obstacles to conversion have been considerable. Extensive political barriers suggest that conversion promotion requires various forms of institutional transformation and social movement mobilization.

To be successful, conversion must be part of a larger political program involving, military budget reductions, reindustrialization, and infrastructure renewal. For example, if a given defense firm should convert, its production could be easily replaced by output from another firm. Marcus Raskin at the Institute for Policy Studies in Washington, D.C. has developed such a draft treaty for comprehensive disarmament.

== See also ==
- Economics of defense
- Just Transition
- Peace dividend
- Swords into ploughshares
