= Andy Pasztor =

Andy Pasztor is a former journalist with The Wall Street Journal. He is the author of the 1995 book When the Pentagon was for Sale: Inside America's Biggest Defense Scandal. Pasztor also appeared in the 2022 documentary film Downfall: The Case Against Boeing, which examined Boeing's role in two fatal crashes of the Boeing 737 MAX: Lion Air Flight 610 and Ethiopian Airlines Flight 302.

== Journalism controversies ==
=== Burt Rutan ===
On February 24, 2010, Andy Pasztor wrote an article titled "Space Pioneer Burt Rutan Blasts New NASA Plan," claiming that Burt Rutan had written a letter to Congress sharply criticizing President Obama's plans to turn over portions of its human spaceflight program to commercial providers. A couple days later Burt Rutan released a statement saying that "the WSJ chose to cherry-pick and misquote my comments to Cong Wolf."

=== SpaceX ===
Immediately following SpaceX's inaugural launch of the Falcon 9 rocket, Andy Pasztor wrote in a Wall Street Journal article titled "SpaceX Illustrates Privatization Risk" on June 7, 2010, alleging that SpaceX claimed it would require $1 billion to build a passenger launch escape system for its rocket, and that the company would likely require future assistance from US taxpayers. When asked about this, SpaceX CEO Elon Musk responded saying:

Andy Pasztor’s article in the Journal was, I’m sorry to say, rife with errors. He was off by a factor of ten on what it would cost SpaceX to develop a launch escape system. Also, under no circumstances would SpaceX be seeking a financing round from the taxpayers. That doesn’t make any sense."

SpaceX and other launch contractors have received substantial money from U.S. taxpayers in the form of NASA contracts. In May 2011 a Government Accountability Office report titled "Commercial Launch Vehicles: NASA Taking Measures to Manage Delays and Risks" stated that starting in November 2011 SpaceX had, in addition to a contract of $278 million, been awarded $118 million for additional Commercial Orbital Transportation Services ("COTS") risk reduction milestones, bringing the company's total cargo-only contract to $396 million for 12 ISS resupply missions.

In April 2011, SpaceX was awarded $75 million (versus Pasztor's estimate of a billion dollars for the passenger launch escape system alone) as a participant in NASA's CCDev2. In August 2012, NASA announced that, as part of NASA's Commercial Crew Integration Capability program, SpaceX won a $440 million contract.

== Awards ==
- 2007 Gerald Loeb Award for Beat Writing for "A Spotlight on Boeing's Legal and Ethical Scandals"
