= Ismael Hossein-zadeh =

An Iranian born Kurd, Drake professor Ismael Hossein-zadeh came to the United States in 1975 as a foreign student to pursue his college education in economics. After completing his graduate work at the New School for Social Research in New York City he joined Drake University faculty in the fall of 1988, where he taught classes in political economy, comparative economic systems, international economics, history of economic thought and development economics until his retirement in 2011. His published work, consisting of three books and numerous scholarly articles, covers significant topics such as financial instability, economic crises and restructuring policies, currency-trade relations, globalization and labor, economics of war and military spending, and the roots of conflict between the Muslim world and the West. He is the author of the following books:

- Beyond Mainstream Explanations of the Financial Crisis: Parasitic Finance Capital (Routledge 2014); ISBN 978-1-136-19000-1

- The Political Economy of U.S. Militarism (Palgrave–Macmillan 2007);

- Soviet Non-capitalist Development: The Case of Nasser’s Egypt (Praeger Publishers 1989).

Professor Hossein-zadeh died due to a cardiovascular disease on September 20, 2019 and buried in his hometown, Boovanloo village, Shirvan, Iran.

More information on Professor Hossein-zadeh can be viewed on his personal Website .
