= James Ledbetter =

American author and journalist (1964–2024)

- Born: James Lester Ledbetter Jr. October 9, 1964; Manchester, Connecticut, U.S.
- Died: October 28, 2024 (aged 60); New York City, U.S.
- Education: Yale University
- Spouse: Erinn Bucklan (separated)
- Children: 1
- Writing career
- Years active: 1985–2024

James Lester Ledbetter Jr. (October 9, 1964 – October 28, 2024) was an American author, journalist and editor based in New York City.

== Career ==
Ledbetter established his national profile in journalism through a clever ruse. In 1985, as a Yale University undergraduate and avowed progressive, Ledbetter decided to impersonate a right-wing, Reaganite student zealot. He went to the Washington D.C. offices of Accuracy in Academia, a neo-McCarthyite watchdog group, and successfully had himself recruited to join. AIA's mission on the college campuses of the 1980s was to compile lists of allegedly "unpatriotic" left-wing professors, and to submit these lists to the Reed Irvine-led group Accuracy in Media, who would then publicize the names as a warning to American college students nationally to avoid these allegedly "anti-American" academics. Ledbetter then (as an undergraduate) published a scathing exposé of Accuracy in Academia, "Campus Double Agent," in the December 30, 1985, issue of The New Republic.

On graduating college, Ledbetter worked as a speechwriter for Elizabeth Holtzman, Brooklyn Attorney General, from 1986 to 1987. He thereafter worked full-time for Mark Green's public advocacy group in New York City, New Democracy Project, from 1987 to 1988.

=== Journalism ===
Next, Ledbetter worked as an editor for the New York listings magazine Seven Days from 1988 to 1990. Thereafter, still in his mid-twenties, he was hired to write the weekly "Press Clips" column vacated by Alexander Cockburn at The Village Voice from 1990 to 1998.

Next, Ledbetter served as the New York bureau chief at The Industry Standard (www.thestandard.net), a weekly print and online magazine that covered the nascent Internet economy, from 1998 to August 2001, when The Industry Standard suddenly folded. Moving to London in 2001, Ledbetter worked as a senior editor at Time magazine's European Desk from 2002 to 2007. Upon returning to New York, he worked briefly as a senior editor at Fortune magazine.

Ledbetter then worked as an editor-in-chief at online media start-up The Big Money, which served as Slate’s effort at a stand-alone business site. This magazine lasted two years, 2008-2010. He left Slate in 2010 for Thomson Reuters in 2010, where he became the wire service’s first Op-Ed editor. He worked there until January 2014, when he was hired by Inc. magazine as a senior editor. In 2018, Ledbetter became Inc.'s Editor-in-Chief, until early 2020.

Over the decades, Ledbetter's writing also has appeared in several other US publications, including The New York Times, The Washington Post, The Nation, Mother Jones, Vibe, Newsday, and The American Prospect.

Ledbetter served as the chief content officer at Sequoia Capital, and as of 2024 was Observer's executive editor.

=== Books ===
Ledbetter's most recent book is One Nation Under Gold, published in 2017 by Liveright Press. Forbes magazine reviewer Ralph Benko called the book "wildly entertaining as well as informative." Ledbetter's previous works include Unwarranted Influence: Dwight D. Eisenhower and the Military-Industrial Complex, published in 2011 by Yale University Press, Dispatches for the New York Tribune: Selected Journalism of Karl Marx, published in the UK in 2007 and the U.S. in 2008 by Penguin Classics, Starving to Death on $200 Million: The Short, Absurd Life of The Industry Standard, and Made Possible By...: The Death of Public Broadcasting in the United States.

== Personal life ==
James Lester Ledbetter Jr. was born in Manchester, Connecticut, on October 9, 1964. He and his wife, Erinn Bucklan, had a son before separating.

Ledbetter died from a heart attack at his Manhattan residence on October 28, 2024, at the age of 60.
