= Peace dividend =

Political slogan about military funding

Peace dividend was a political slogan popularized by U.S. President George H. W. Bush and British Prime Minister Margaret Thatcher in the light of the 1988–1991 dissolution of the Soviet Union, which described the economic benefit of a decrease in defense spending. The term was frequently used at the end of the Cold War, when many Western nations significantly cut military spending such as Britain's 1990 Options for Change defence review. However, despite reductions in defense spending in both the West and the former Soviet Union, a peace dividend proved elusive both because demilitarization is itself costly and because militarization is more complicated than simple extraction of resources from an economy. The term is closely related to the guns versus butter model.

== In theory ==
While economies do undergo a recession after the end of a major conflict as the economy is forced to adjust and retool, a "peace dividend" refers to a potential long-term benefit as budgets for defense spending are assumed to be at least partially redirected to social programs and/or a decrease in taxation rates. The existence of a peace dividend in real economies is still debated, but some research points to its reality.

A political discussion about the peace dividend resulting from the end of the Cold War involves a debate about which countries have actually scaled back military spending and which have not. The scaling back in defense spending was mainly noticeable in Western Europe and in the Russian Federation. Although United States military spending rapidly fell between 1985 and 1993 and remained flat between 1993 and 1999, it increased strongly after the September 11 attacks, funding conflicts including the war on terror, the War in Afghanistan and the War in Iraq.

U.S. intellectual Noam Chomsky has argued that American military spending was not due to security reasons, but rather a politically consensual mechanism to subsidize technological innovation via massive public military spending to benefit defense corporations and their partners. Therefore, Chomsky asserts that there is no interest in the U.S. toward a peace dividend when peace arrives. On the contrary, the fall of the Soviet Union allowed the U.S. to look for new external wars to justify the desired military spending at home.

== In practice ==
Over time, from the beginning of the Cold War to the present, the defense aspect has played a smaller or larger part of society, fluctuating according to different conditions.

=== Europe ===
European nations were sharply criticised by a December 2023 Wall Street Journal article for the lack of progress on arming themselves since Russia's invasion of Ukraine in 2022. Provided examples included Denmark having no heavy artillery or air defence, France only having 90 howitzers, and Germany only having two days of ammunition stored. Noting that West Germany used to have 7,000 tanks, the article pointed out that now-unified Germany has only 200. In addition, military production is low in volume.

Countries in the European Union such as Germany have long been reducing their military spending. With a NATO member's average spending in 1989 being 4% of GDP, the number of tanks and equipment has been slashed alongside spending. In 2014, that same spending had dropped to 1.4%. The Washington Post described Germany as having the most "stunning" turnaround after 2022. The peace dividend also affected the structure of Europe's militaries. Many European countries abolished conscription and moved to professional armies. The peace dividend not only shows itself in the military sphere, but economically as well. When the Russian 2022 invasion of Ukraine began, it was discovered how unprepared and dependent some European countries were on Russian energy and raw materials. Germany had to scramble to build new LNG terminals. Another vulnerability is pipelines and other infrastructure running on the seabed, evidenced by the Nord Stream explosions. The Nord Stream incidents have highlighted similar threats to "critical infrastructure", such as against the energy network or the information network, like undersea cables.

Some countries in Europe, such as Finland, did not abolish their conscription and bought many weapons from the disarming nations, such as M270 and Leopard tanks from the Netherlands. Thus, Finland is among the better-armed nations in Europe today, while the Netherlands receives criticism for no longer having tanks. However, even with these aspects, Finland also had its defense budget go under 2% in the post-Cold War period. Sweden abolished its conscription, but re-implemented it following the Russian annexation of Crimea. Conscription has been further reinforced since the 2022 invasion.

Bruegel estimates that the peace dividend has benefited Europe by 4,200 billion euros over a 30-year period.

The logic behind not spending money on threats like those outlined is that it is thought to spur economic growth by freeing up defense spending for other things. The Conversation states that the peace dividend helped finance the British welfare state, noting that "The UK currently spends slightly over 2% of GDP on defence each year, amounting to some £45 billion in 2021, or about £660 per person. This has fallen substantially over time. In the mid-1950s, the UK spent almost 8% of GDP on defence. That fell to about 4% in 1980, 3% in 1990, and around 2% today. At the same time, spending on the health service has grown from around 3% of GDP in the mid-1950s to more than 7% on the eve of the pandemic." While the peace dividend was somewhat criticised earlier in the 1990s, with the war launched by Russia against Ukraine, the peace dividend came to the fore of societal discussion, and countries' spending on preventing threats started to increase. Not everyone has criticised the peace dividend as a negative; according to one research paper: "This study found that the results varied according to national characteristics and regional environmental characteristics. However, peace dividends generally had a significant impact on national productivity."

==== NATO spending ====
According to a 2023 Econpol report, NATO defense spending increased as a result of Russia's invasion, from an overall pre-war level of 1.7% of GDP to 1.9% in 2023, and 11 nations out of the 30 members (including Sweden, which was not a NATO member at the time) were spending above the 2% level. Poland became the biggest spender per capita and issued the biggest increase to its budget as well. The report noted there is an East-to-West divide, with countries closest to Russia increasing spending the most in general. Some countries reduced their per capita spending during the same 2021-2023 period, such as Portugal, the United States and Croatia.

The Econpol report explains that "Protection against external threats is a public good—and one of the core tasks of a state" ... "Maintaining an armed force, however, is expensive. Many NATO members must consolidate their budgets and have hardly any leeway for significant increases in expenditure." ... "If higher defense spending means making spending cuts elsewhere or raising taxes or public debt, it will be difficult for them to achieve a majority in parliament and elections, which may tempt some of them to simply announce that the 2% target will be reached sometime in the future." However, the report also states in its conclusions that "Clearly, Europe’s peace dividend has come to an end."

==== Role of conscription in the debate ====
In 2024, some countries in Europe, such as Germany and the United Kingdom, have started to debate conscription. The central question is whether they should remain on a 'career' army path or go to some form of conscription. In Germany, there is debate on emulating the "Swedish Model" of limited conscription mentioned above, while the UK is considering either a "citizen army" made up of volunteers or a revival of conscription. In 2017, when Sweden re-introduced conscription, their initial model was based on that of Norway. The Swedish conscription law was originally enacted in 1901, while in 2009, conscription was deactivated during peacetime, though the old law was still left in force. The current conscription model means that both men and women may have to serve as soldiers.

=== North America ===
According to Forbes, the U.S. helped win the Cold War with a high level of defense spending. Defense spending has decreased since the end of the Cold War, in comparison with total federal spending. Regarding predictions that defense spending would drop after the Cold War, it states: "This assessment proved to be accurate, as defense outlays as a share of total federal spending declined thereafter. The decade of the 1990s, in turn, was marked by above-average economic growth of more than 3.5% per annum, low inflation and a federal budget surplus by the end of the decade."

In an article based on an opinion piece by Marco Rubio, it highlighted that the U.S. military fell 41,000 recruits short of its recruitment goals. Rubio criticized the US for the peace dividend not looking good in the U.S. EconoFacts questioned what the current defense budget is spent on, noting that the peace dividend has caused military spending to decrease from 6% of GDP to 3%.

Canada needs to spend an additional $18.2 billion to meet the two percent defense spending goal set by NATO, in addition to the already planned increases. Since the 1970s, Canada's spending has ranked among the lower spenders on defense in the alliance.

=== Oceania ===
In Australia, the term has been linked to the Voice Referendum. There were worries that the downvoting of said proposal could lead to an increase in the culture wars. Other opinions stayed more true to the original definition of the term and expressed worry about how "This reprioritisation of government spending could hurt Western living standards, including Australia’s. The absence of the peace dividend could hit the funding of education, health, lower taxes, the transition to a greener economy, housing and so on, as pressing needs other than defence are pushed to the side." Others have been worried about the peace dividend being too strong in Australia in light of recent world events following the dissolution of the Soviet Union. One such statement reads: "Indeed, it is now well recognised that the Australian Defence Force is in a position similar to that of a decade ago, with little progress made in the way of new capabilities being delivered to the ADF" and highlighting the changing times, also stating that Australia should do more in the defense space.

=== Africa ===
The African Union used the term in its December 2022 newsletter, linking it strongly with peace negotiations. The AU highlighted peace efforts such as the one between the Ethiopian government and the TPLF and that peace treaties would allow African countries to reap peace dividends, such as from good governance.

=== Latin America ===
Viviana García Pinzón highlights the mixed results of the peace dividend in Colombia following the FARC peace agreement. She writes that there have been some advances in democracy and a shifting of public debate to issues like inequality and corruption, but that violence still has not ended despite the agreement. Due to the lack of implementation of the peace accords, Colombia is caught in a middle state between fully gaining the dividends from peace and sliding back towards the previous levels of violence.

== In history ==
=== Ancient Egypt ===
Toby Wilkinson, in his book on Ancient Egypt, states that Thutmose IV had the opportunity to get economic benefits for Egypt by signing peace with the Mitanni. The Pharaoh could then put economic resources into construction projects. Further commenting on the aftermath of the Battle of Kadesh, he writes: "Ramesses II’s strategic aims, the standoff and cessation of hostilities did at least allow him to reap a peace dividend. Resources that might have been expended on foreign military adventures could instead be invested in projects at home". Ramesses could also divert resources to building projects. Building projects usually employed significant amounts of the workforce.

== See also ==
- Deterrence theory
- Guns versus butter model
- Last Supper (defense industry)
