= Frank Dorrel =

US Air Force veteran and activist

Frank Dorrel is an American peace activist. A former United States Air Force personnel, he is now a Veteran for Peace.

Dorrel publishes and distributes Addicted to War, Why The U.S. Can’t Kick Militarism by Joel Andreas. This anti-war comic book is a history of U.S. militarism and has become one of the most popular books in the Peace Movement. It is being used in hundreds of high schools and colleges all over the country.

Dorrel put together a two-hour film titled What I’ve Learned About U.S. Foreign Policy: The War Against The Third World, which has been seen by as many as 2 million people since 2000. He also distributes the film Arlington West by Peter Dudar and Sally Marr.

Dorrel is a member of Veterans For Peace, both local and national chapters. He was in the U.S. Air Force. He helped to start the Arlington West Memorial in Santa Monica, a project of the Los Angeles Chapter of Veterans For Peace. The Arlington West Memorial has been erected next to the Santa Monica Pier each and every Sunday since February 2004.

He is on the board of the Coalition Against Militarism in Our Schools (CAMS) and the executive board of the Office of the Americas.

Dorrel has worked closely with Cole Miller, founder of No More Victims and with many other Peace and Justice organizations in Los Angeles and around the country.

Dorrel has put on many anti-war events in the Los Angeles area in the last six years, many times co-hosting with Don White. During this same time period, Dorrel and his wife Jane, have hosted four or five events each year at their home in Culver City.

== See also ==
- List of peace activists
