= First presidency of Donald Trump =

2017–2021 U.S. presidential administration

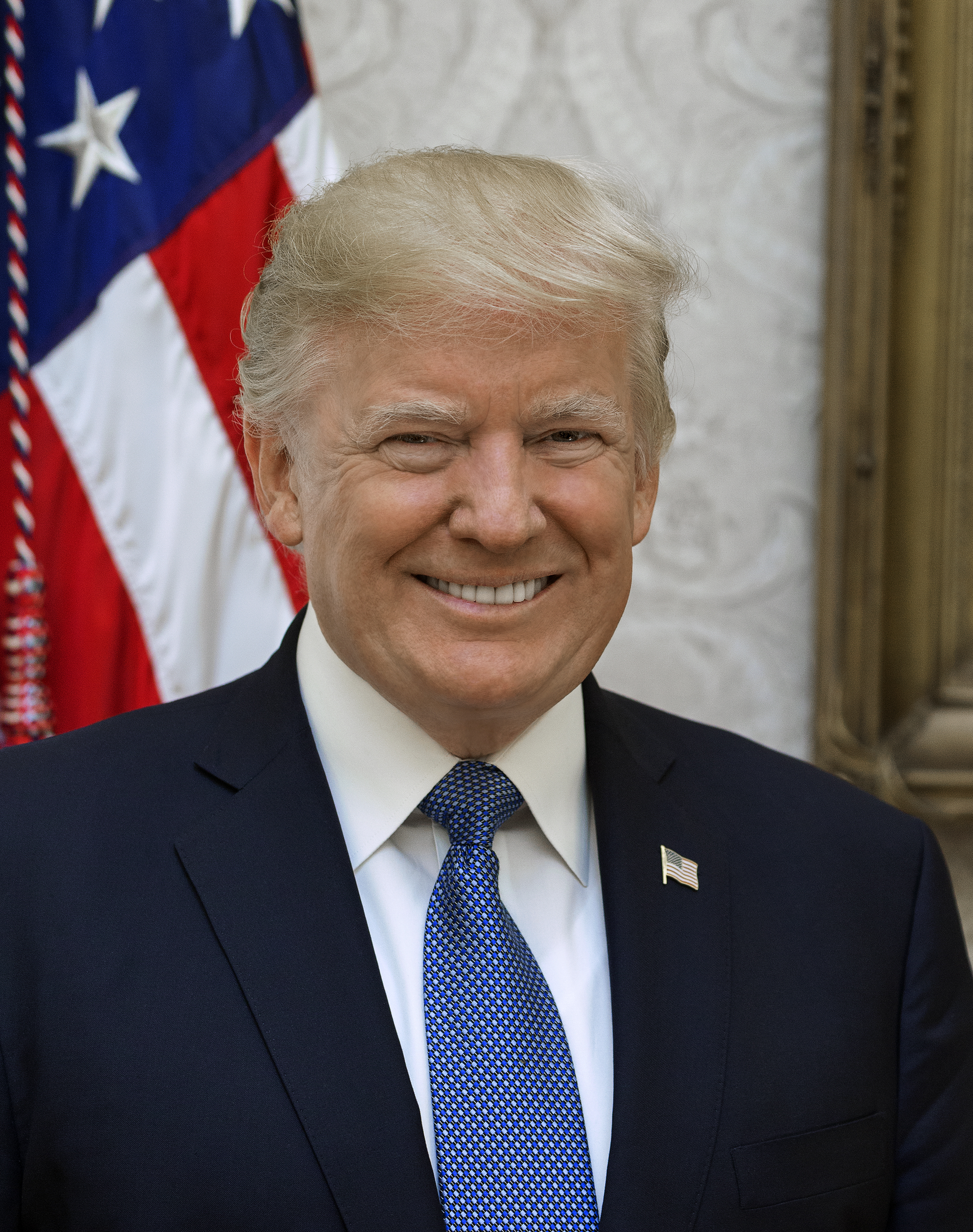
- Official portrait, 2017
- First presidency of Donald Trump; January 20, 2017 – January 20, 2021
- Vice President: Mike Pence
- Cabinet: Full list
- Party: Republican
- Election: 2016
- Seat: White House
- Seal of the President

Donald Trump's first tenure as the president of the United States began on January 20, 2017, when he was inaugurated as the 45th president, and ended on January 20, 2021. Trump, a Republican, took office after defeating Democratic nominee Hillary Clinton in 2016. Upon his inauguration, he became the first president in American history without prior public office or military background. Trump made an unprecedented number of false or misleading statements during his 2016 campaign and first presidency. Alongside Trump's first presidency, the Republican Party also held their majorities in the House of Representatives and the Senate during the 115th U.S. Congress following the 2016 elections, thereby attaining an overall federal government trifecta. Trump's first presidency ended following his re-election defeat to Democratic nominee Joe Biden in 2020.

Trump signed the Tax Cuts and Jobs Act of 2017, the First Step Act, and a partial repeal of the Dodd–Frank Act. He appointed Neil Gorsuch, Brett Kavanaugh, and Amy Coney Barrett to the Supreme Court. Trump sought substantial spending cuts to major welfare programs, including Medicare and Medicaid. He was unsuccessful in his efforts to repeal the Affordable Care Act, but rescinded the individual mandate. Trump reversed numerous environmental regulations, and withdrew from the Paris Agreement on climate change. He enacted various tariffs, triggering retaliatory tariffs from China, Canada, Mexico, and the European Union. He withdrew from the Trans-Pacific Partnership negotiations and signed the United States–Mexico–Canada Agreement (USMCA), a successor to the North American Free Trade Agreement with modest changes. Trump oversaw the third-biggest federal deficit growth of any president; it significantly increased under Trump due to simultaneous spending increases and tax cuts.

Starting in 2018, Trump implemented a controversial family separation policy for migrants apprehended at the United States–Mexico border. His demand for the federal funding of a border wall resulted in the longest U.S. government shutdown in history, a record that stood until 2025, under his his second term. In 2020, he deployed federal law enforcement forces in response to racial unrest.

Trump's "America First" foreign policy was characterized by unilateral actions and a disregard for traditional norms and foreign allies. His administration implemented a major arms sale to Saudi Arabia; denied citizens from six Muslim-majority countries entry into the United States; recognized Jerusalem as the capital of Israel; and brokered the Abraham Accords, a series of normalization agreements between Israel and various Arab states. Trump withdrew United States troops from northern Syria, allowing Turkey to occupy the area. His administration made a conditional deal with the Taliban to withdraw United States troops from Afghanistan in 2021. Trump met North Korea's leader Kim Jong Un three times. He withdrew the United States from the Iran nuclear agreement and later escalated tensions in the Persian Gulf by ordering the assassination of Iranian general Qasem Soleimani.

Robert Mueller's Special Counsel investigation (2017–2019) concluded that Russia interfered to favor Trump's candidacy in the 2016 election and that, while the prevailing evidence "did not establish that members of the Trump campaign conspired or coordinated with the Russian government", possible obstructions of justice occurred during the course of that investigation. Trump attempted to pressure Ukraine to announce investigations into Biden. This triggered Trump's first impeachment by the House of Representatives on December 18, 2019; he was acquitted by the Senate on February 5, 2020.

Trump reacted slowly to the COVID-19 pandemic, ignored or contradicted many recommendations from health officials in his messaging, and promoted misinformation about unproven treatments and the availability of testing. After signing the CARES Act, Trump initiated Operation Warp Speed to facilitate and accelerate the development, manufacturing, and distribution of COVID-19 vaccines.

Following his loss in 2020 to Biden, Trump falsely alleged widespread electoral fraud and initiated an extensive campaign to overturn the results. At a rally on January 6, 2021, Trump urged his supporters to march to the Capitol, where the electoral votes were being counted by Congress in order to formalize Biden's victory. A mob of Trump supporters stormed the Capitol, suspending the count and causing Vice President Mike Pence and other members of Congress to be evacuated. On January 13, the House voted to impeach Trump an unprecedented second time for incitement of insurrection, but he was later acquitted by the Senate again on February 13, after he had already left office.

Trump later ran for re-election again in 2024, and he was successfully re-elected to a second, non-consecutive term, after defeating Democratic nominee Kamala Harris. He started his second presidency on January 20, 2025, as the 47th president, thus becoming the second former U.S. president to return to office. (Note: The first was Grover Cleveland, following his victory in the 1892 presidential election.)

== Election and transition ==
=== 2016 election ===
2016 Electoral College vote results. Five individuals besides Trump and Clinton received electoral votes from faithless electors.

Trump announced his candidacy for the nomination of the Republican Party in the 2016 presidential election on June 16, 2015. In May 2016, Trump secured the Republican nomination. Trump selected Governor Mike Pence of Indiana as his running mate, and the two were officially nominated at the 2016 Republican National Convention.

Early on November 9, 2016, the day after the election, Trump was projected to have secured the presidency. Trump won the presidential election with 304 electoral votes and 46.1% of the popular vote, while Hillary Clinton received 227 electoral votes and 48.2% of the popular vote. (Note: Clinton won a plurality of the nationwide popular vote, receiving nearly 2.9 million more votes than Trump.) Trump thus became the fifth person to win the presidency while losing the popular vote. The electoral votes were certified on January 6, 2017. In the concurrent congressional elections, Republicans secured a government trifecta after retaining their majorities in the House of Representatives and the Senate, and Speaker of the House Paul Ryan and Senate Majority Leader Mitch McConnell both remained in their posts.

=== Transition period and inauguration ===
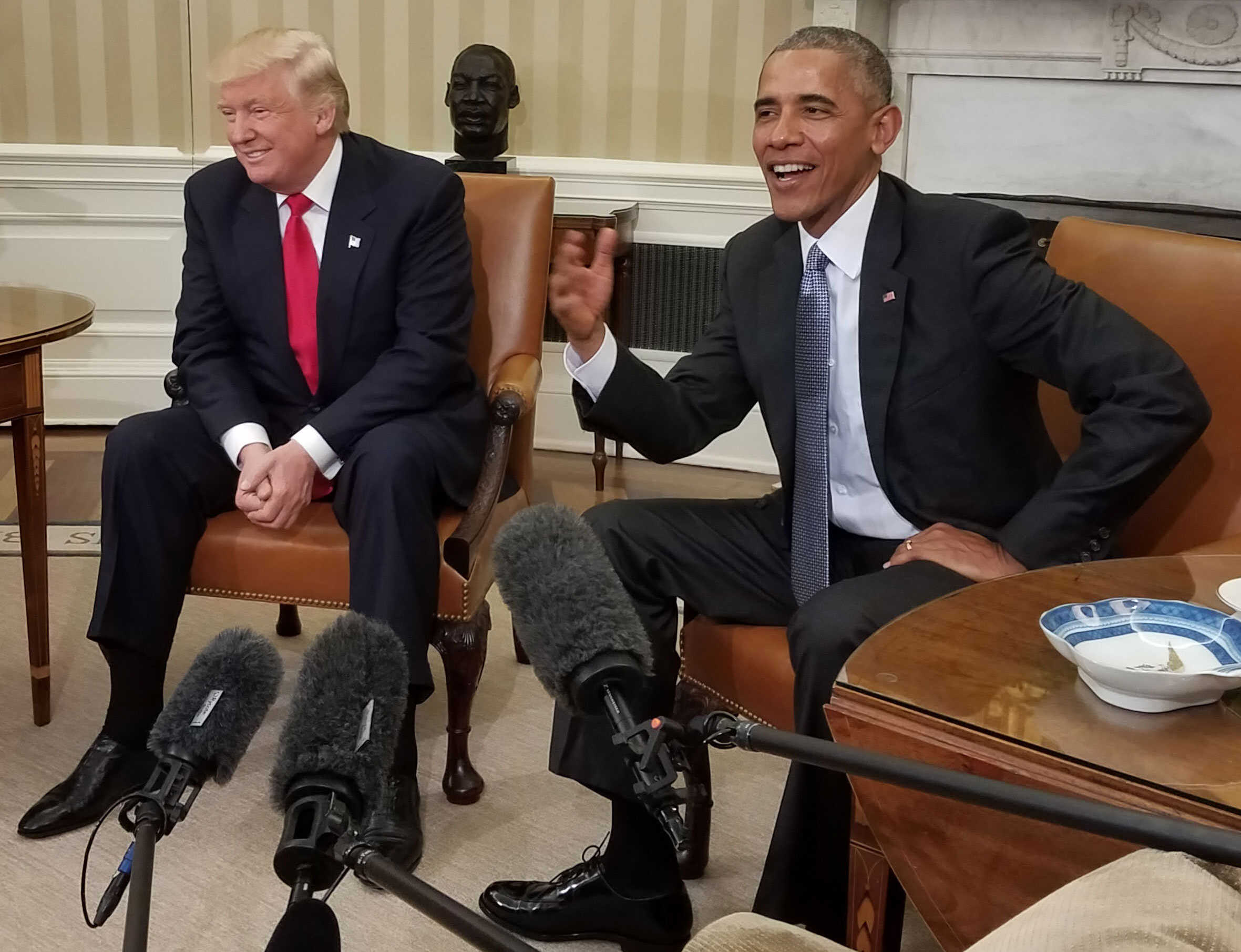
Incumbent president Barack Obama and President-elect Trump in the Oval Office on November 10, 2016

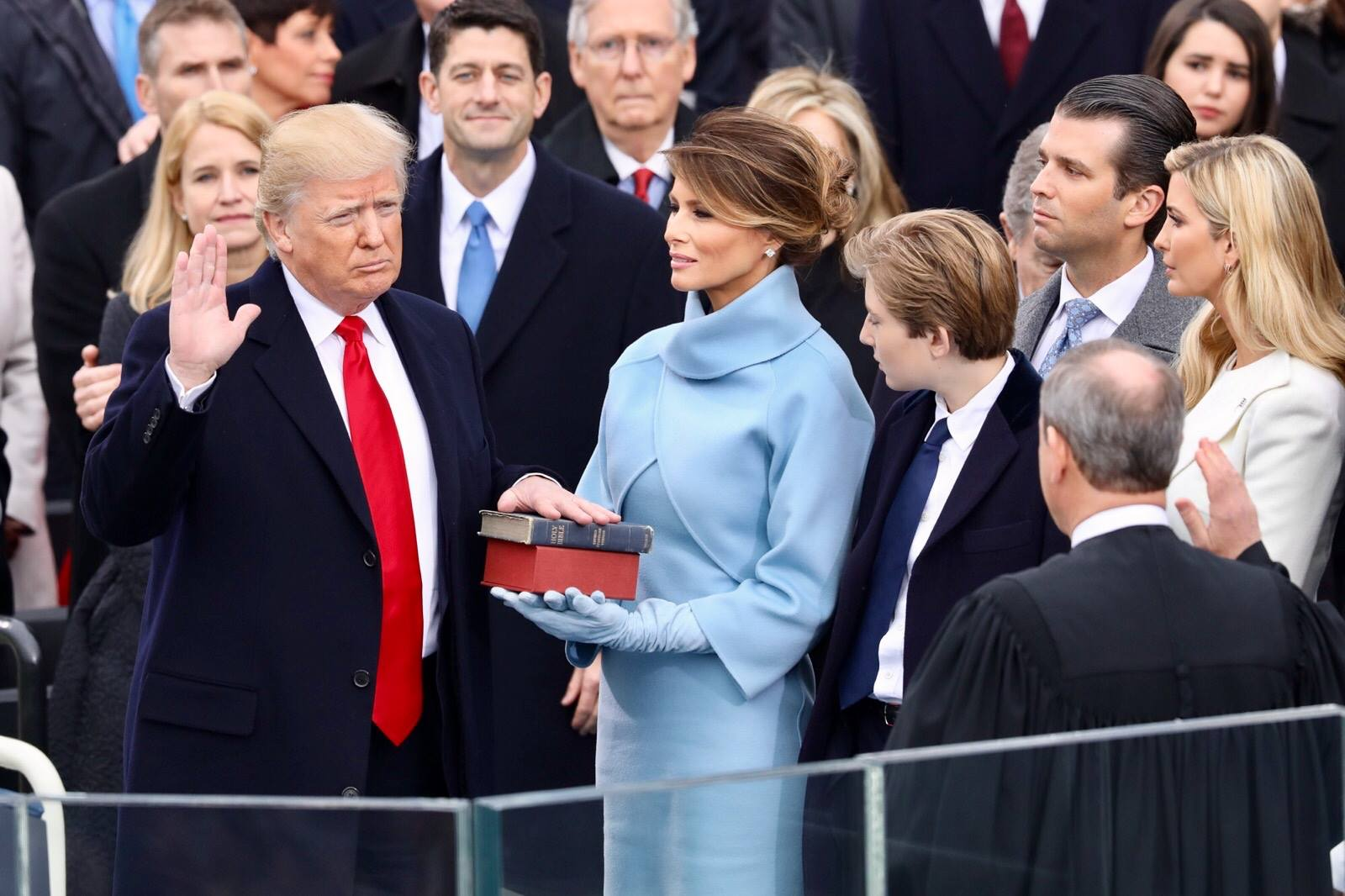
Chief Justice John Roberts administers the presidential oath of office to Trump at the Capitol, January 20, 2017

The presidential transition period began following Trump's victory in the 2016 U.S. presidential election, though Trump had chosen Bill Hagerty to begin planning for the transition in August 2016. During the transition period, Trump announced nominations for his cabinet and administration.

Trump was inaugurated on January 20, 2017, officially assuming the presidency at 12:00 pm, EST. He was sworn in by Chief Justice John Roberts. In his seventeen-minute inaugural address, Trump painted a dark picture of contemporary America, pledging to end "American carnage" caused by urban crime and saying America's "wealth, strength, and confidence has dissipated" by jobs lost overseas. He declared his strategy would be "America First." The largest single-day protest in U.S. history, the Women's March, took place the day after his inauguration and was driven by opposition to Trump and his policies and views.

== Administration ==
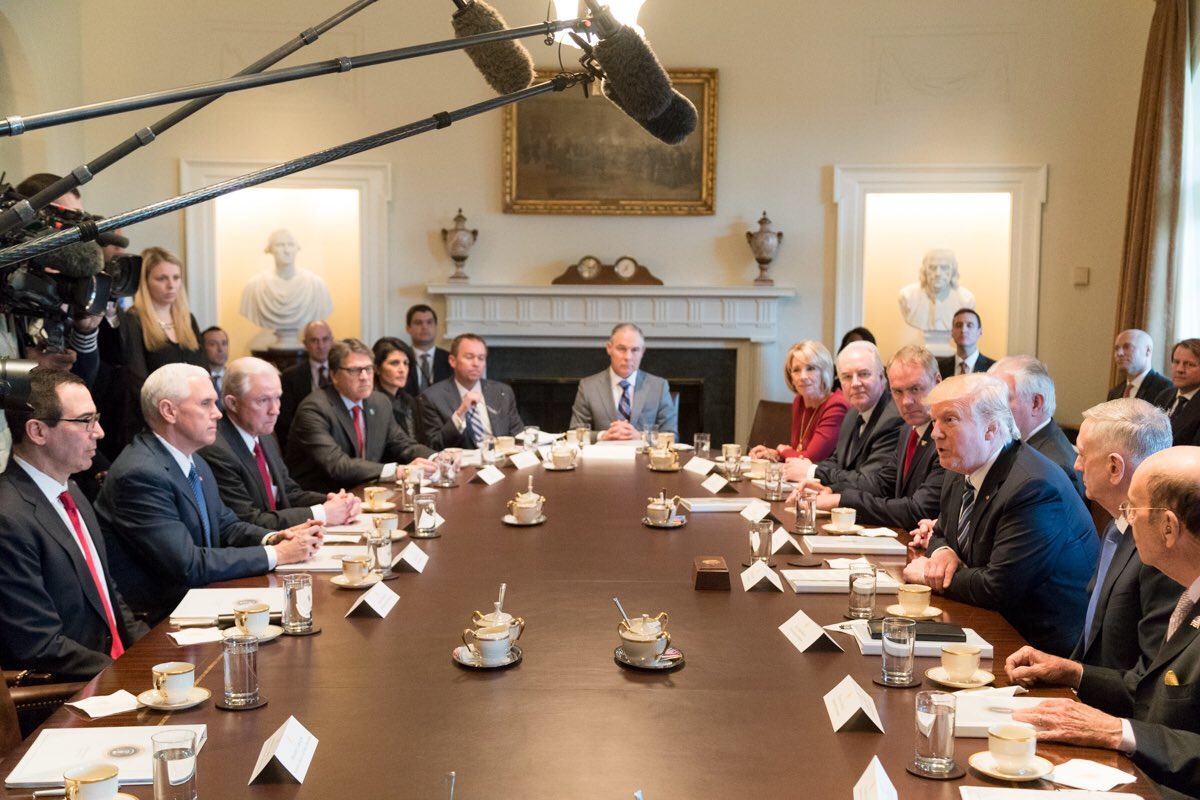
Cabinet meeting, March 2017

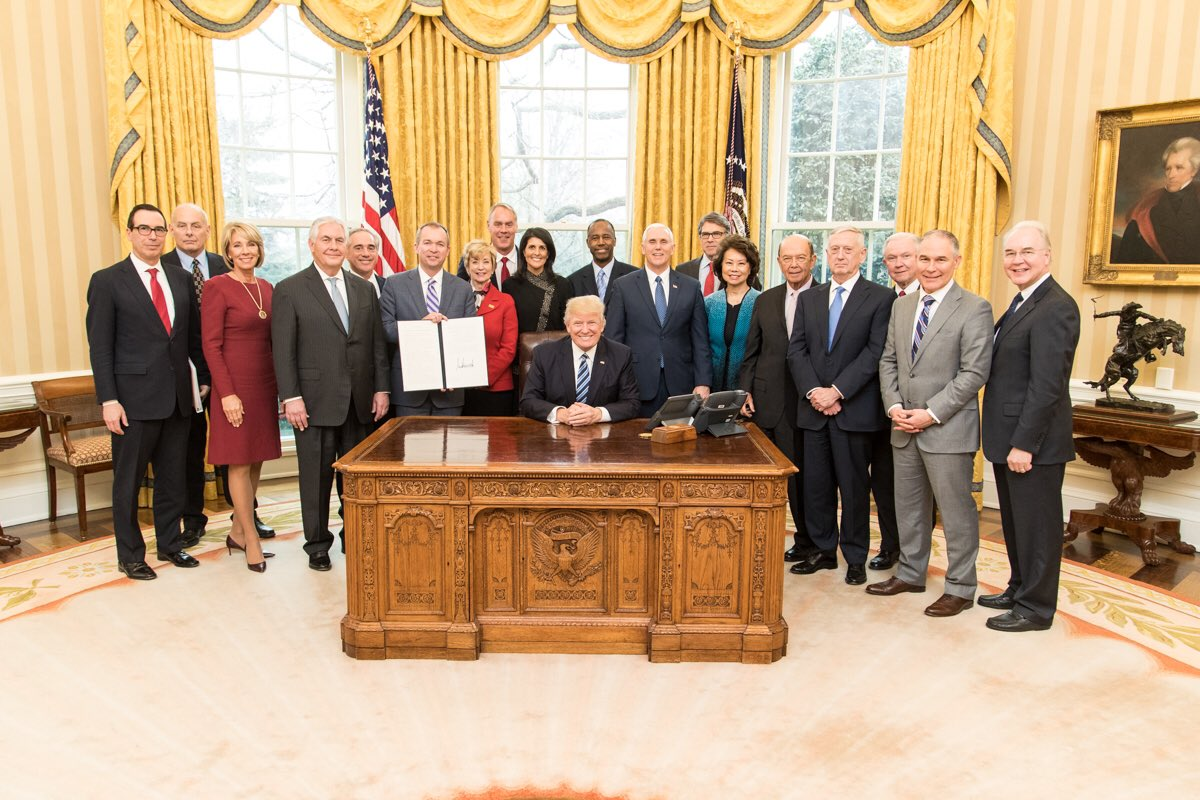

First Trump cabinet
| Office | Name | Term |
| President | Donald Trump | 2017–2021 |
| Vice President | Mike Pence | 2017–2021 |
| Secretary of State | Rex Tillerson | 2017–2018 |
| Mike Pompeo | 2018–2021 |
| Secretary of the Treasury | Steven Mnuchin | 2017–2021 |
| Secretary of Defense | Jim Mattis | 2017–2019 |
| Mark Esper | 2019–2020 |
| Christopher C. Miller (acting) | 2020–2021 |
| Attorney General | Jeff Sessions | 2017–2018 |
| William Barr | 2019–2020 |
| Jeffrey A. Rosen (acting) | 2020–2021 |
| Secretary of the Interior | Ryan Zinke | 2017–2019 |
| David Bernhardt | 2019–2021 |
| Secretary of Agriculture | Sonny Perdue | 2017–2021 |
| Secretary of Commerce | Wilbur Ross | 2017–2021 |
| Secretary of Labor | Alexander Acosta | 2017–2019 |
| Eugene Scalia | 2019–2021 |
| Secretary of Health and Human Services | Tom Price | 2017 |
| Alex Azar | 2018–2021 |
| Secretary of Housing and Urban Development | Ben Carson | 2017–2021 |
| Secretary of Transportation | Elaine Chao | 2017–2021 |
| Secretary of Energy | Rick Perry | 2017–2019 |
| Dan Brouillette | 2019–2021 |
| Secretary of Education | Betsy DeVos | 2017–2021 |
| Secretary of Veterans Affairs | David Shulkin | 2017–2018 |
| Robert Wilkie | 2018–2021 |
| Secretary of Homeland Security | John F. Kelly | 2017 |
| Kirstjen Nielsen | 2017–2019 |
| Chad Wolf (acting) | 2019–2021 |
| Administrator of the Environmental Protection Agency | Scott Pruitt | 2017–2018 |
| Andrew Wheeler | 2018–2021 |
| Director of the Office of Management and Budget | Mick Mulvaney | 2017–2020 |
| Russell Vought | 2020–2021 |
| Director of National Intelligence | Dan Coats | 2017–2019 |
| John Ratcliffe | 2020–2021 |
| Director of the Central Intelligence Agency | Mike Pompeo | 2017–2018 |
| Gina Haspel | 2018–2021 |
| United States Trade Representative | Robert Lighthizer | 2017–2021 |
| Ambassador to the United Nations | Nikki Haley | 2017–2018 |
| Kelly Craft* | 2019–2021 |
| Administrator of the Small Business Administration | Linda McMahon | 2017–2019 |
| Jovita Carranza | 2020–2021 |
| White House Chief of Staff | Reince Priebus | 2017 |
| John F. Kelly | 2017–2019 |
| Mark Meadows | 2020–2021 |
- *Lowered to non-cabinet position following Haley's exit in 2018

The Trump administration was characterized by record turnover, particularly among White House staff. By early 2018, 43% of senior White House positions had turned over. The administration had a higher turnover rate in the first two and a half years than the five previous presidents did over their entire terms.

By October 2019, one in 14 of Trump's political appointees were former lobbyists; less than three years into his presidency, Trump had appointed more than four times as many lobbyists than his predecessor Barack Obama did over the course of his first six years in office.

Trump's cabinet included U.S. senator from Alabama Jeff Sessions as attorney general, banker Steve Mnuchin as Treasury Secretary, retired Marine Corps general James Mattis as Defense Secretary, and ExxonMobil CEO Rex Tillerson as Secretary of State. Trump also brought on board politicians who had opposed him during the presidential campaign, such as neurosurgeon Ben Carson as Secretary of Housing and Urban Development, and South Carolina governor Nikki Haley as Ambassador to the United Nations.

=== Cabinet ===
Days after the presidential election, Trump selected RNC Chairman Reince Priebus as his chief of staff. Trump chose Sessions for the position of attorney general.

In February 2017, Trump formally announced his cabinet structure, elevating the Director of National Intelligence and Director of the Central Intelligence Agency to cabinet level. The Chair of the Council of Economic Advisers, which had been added to the cabinet by Obama in 2009, was removed from the cabinet. Trump's cabinet consisted of 24 members, more than Obama at 23 or George W. Bush at 21.

On February 13, 2017, Trump fired Michael Flynn from the post of National Security Advisor on grounds that he had lied to Vice President Pence about his communications with Russian Ambassador Sergey Kislyak; Flynn later pleaded guilty to lying to the Federal Bureau of Investigation (FBI) about his contacts with Russia. Flynn was fired amidst the ongoing controversy concerning Russian interference in the 2016 election and accusations that Trump's electoral team colluded with Russian agents.

In July 2017, John F. Kelly, who had served as secretary of Homeland Security, replaced Priebus as chief of staff. In September 2017, Tom Price resigned as Secretary of HHS amid criticism over his use of private charter jets for personal travel. Kirstjen Nielsen succeeded Kelly as secretary in December 2017. Secretary of State Rex Tillerson was fired via a tweet in March 2018; Trump appointed Mike Pompeo to replace Tillerson and Gina Haspel to succeed Pompeo as the director of the CIA. In the wake of a series of scandals, Scott Pruitt resigned as Administrator of the Environmental Protection Agency (EPA) in July 2018. Secretary of Defense Jim Mattis informed Trump of his resignation following Trump's abrupt December 19, 2018, announcement that the remaining 2,000 American troops in Syria would be withdrawn, against the recommendations of his military and civilian advisors.

Trump fired numerous inspectors general of agencies, including those who were probing the Trump administration and close Trump associates. In 2020, he fired five inspectors general in two months. The Washington Post wrote, "For the first time since the system was created in the aftermath of the Watergate scandal, inspectors general find themselves under systematic attack from the president, putting independent oversight of federal spending and operations at risk."

=== Dismissal of James Comey ===
Trump dismissed FBI Director James Comey on May 9, 2017, saying he had accepted the recommendations of Attorney General Sessions and Deputy Attorney General Rod Rosenstein to dismiss Comey. Sessions's recommendation was based on Rosenstein's, while Rosenstein wrote that Comey should be dismissed for his handling of the conclusion of the FBI investigation into the Hillary Clinton email controversy. On May 10, Trump met Russian foreign minister Sergey Lavrov and Russian ambassador Sergey Kislyak in the Oval Office. Based on White House notes of the meeting, Trump told the Russians, "I just fired the head of the FBI. He was crazy, a real nut job ... I faced great pressure because of Russia. That's taken off." On May 11, Trump said in a videoed interview, "... regardless of recommendation, I was going to fire Comey ... in fact, when I decided to just do it, I said to myself, I said, you know, this Russia thing with Trump and Russia is a made-up story." On May 18, Rosenstein told members of the U.S. Senate that he recommended Comey's dismissal while knowing Trump had already decided to fire Comey. In the aftermath of Comey's firing, the events were compared with those of the "Saturday Night Massacre" during Richard Nixon's administration and there was debate over whether Trump had provoked a constitutional crisis, as he had dismissed the man leading an investigation into Trump's associates. Trump's statements raised concerns of potential obstruction of justice. In Comey's memo about a February 2017 meeting with Trump, Comey said Trump attempted to persuade him to abort the investigation into Flynn.

== Judicial appointments ==
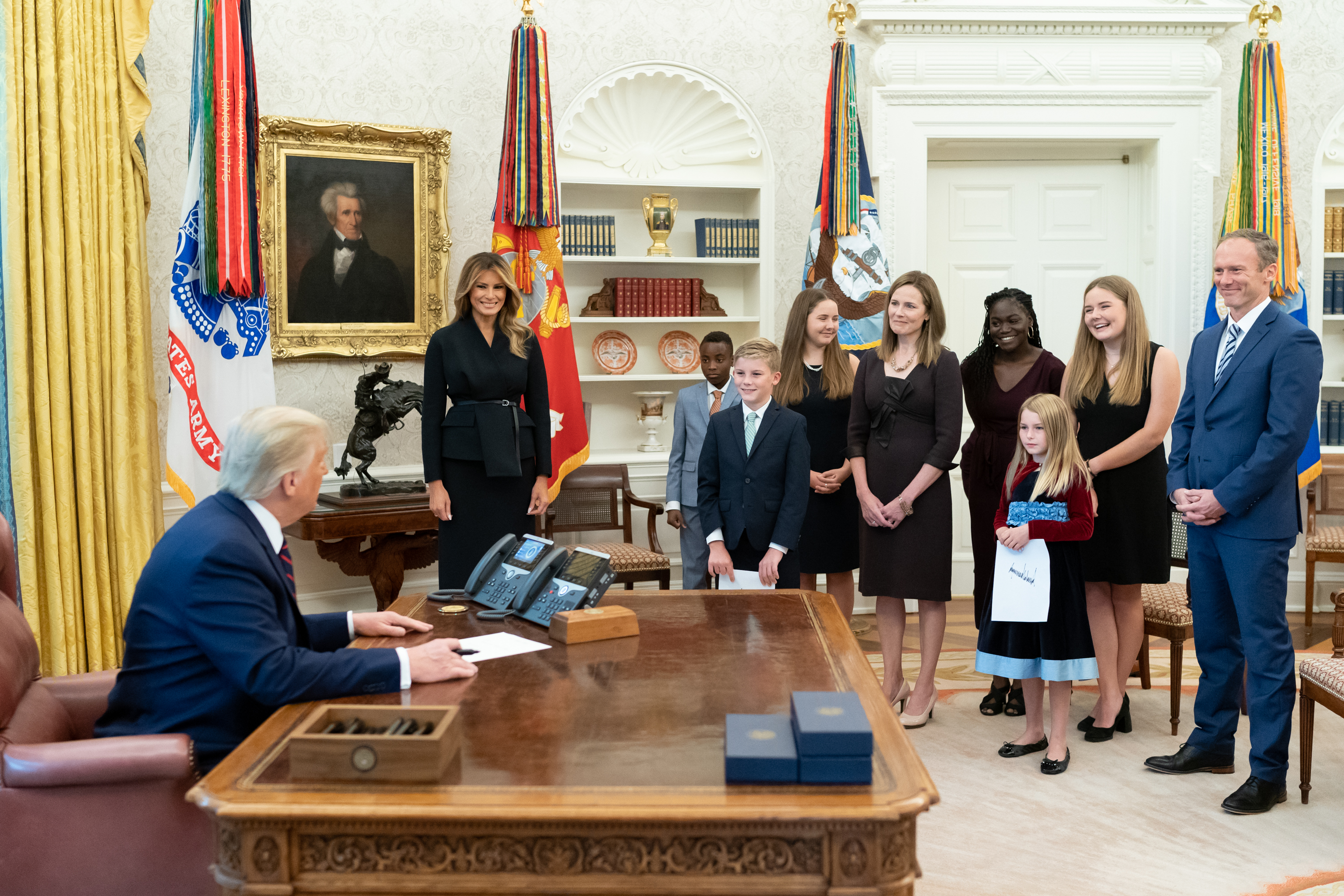
Supreme Court nominee Amy Coney Barrett and her family with Trump on September 26, 2020

After Republicans won control of the U.S. Senate in 2014, only 28.6 percent of judicial nominees were confirmed, "the lowest percentage of confirmations from 1977 to 2018". At the end of the Obama presidency, 105 judgeships were vacant. Senate Republicans, led by Senate Majority Leader Mitch McConnell, prioritized confirming Trump's judicial appointees, doing so rapidly. By November 2018, Trump had appointed 29 judges to the U.S. courts of appeals, more than any modern president in the first two years of a presidential term.

Trump ultimately appointed 226 Article III federal judges and 260 federal judges in total. His appointees, who were usually affiliated with the conservative Federalist Society, shifted the judiciary to the right. A third of Trump's appointees were under 45 years old when appointed, far higher than under previous presidents. Trump's judicial nominees were less likely to be female or ethnic minority than those of the previous administration. Of Trump's judicial appointments to the U.S. courts of appeals (circuit courts), two-thirds were white men, compared to 31% of Obama nominees and 63% of George W. Bush nominees.

=== Supreme Court nominations ===
Trump made three nominations to the Supreme Court: Neil Gorsuch, Brett Kavanaugh, and Amy Coney Barrett:

- Trump nominated Neil Gorsuch in January 2017 to fill the vacancy left by the death of Justice Antonin Scalia in February 2016, which had not been filled by Obama because the Republican-majority Senate did not consider the nomination of Merrick Garland. The Senate confirmed Gorsuch in a mostly party-line vote of 54–45 in April 2017. Gorsuch's confirmation was one of Trump's major first year accomplishments, made as part of a "100‑day pledge".
- Trump nominated Brett Kavanaugh in July 2018 to replace retiring Justice Anthony Kennedy, who was considered a key swing vote on the Supreme Court. The Senate confirmed Kavanaugh in a mostly party-line vote of 50–48 in October 2018 after allegations that Kavanaugh had attempted to rape another student when they were both in high school, which Kavanaugh denied.
- Trump nominated Amy Coney Barrett in September 2020 to fill the vacancy left by the death of Justice Ruth Bader Ginsburg. Ginsburg was considered part of the Court's liberal wing and her replacement with a conservative jurist substantially changed the ideological composition of the Supreme Court. Democrats opposed the nomination, arguing that the court vacancy should not be filled until after the 2020 presidential election. On October 26, 2020, the Senate confirmed Barrett by a mostly party-line vote of 52–48, with all Democrats opposing her confirmation.

== Leadership style ==
Political scientist Daniel W. Drezner writes in The Toddler in Chief that Trump's staff and allies frequently characterized Trump as infantile. He was reported to not read briefing documents, such as the President's Daily Brief, preferring oral briefings. Briefs would be kept short and mention his name repeatedly to keep his attention, and use visuals: "pictures, maps, charts and graphs". He would also watch up to eight hours of television each day, especially Fox News programs, and use their talking points in tweets. He was reportedly angry if the information contradicted his views and statements.

He reportedly fostered chaos as a management technique, resulting in low morale and confusion among staff. He was unable to compromise during the 115th U.S. Congress, which led to gridlock and few legislative accomplishments, despite Republican control of both houses of Congress. Presidential historian Doris Kearns Goodwin found Trump lacked several traits of an effective leader, including humility, empathy, and collaboration, among others

Axios reported in 2018 and 2019 that his working hours were less than the beginning of his presidency, with fewer meetings and more unstructured free time, labelled "executive time".

=== False and misleading statements ===
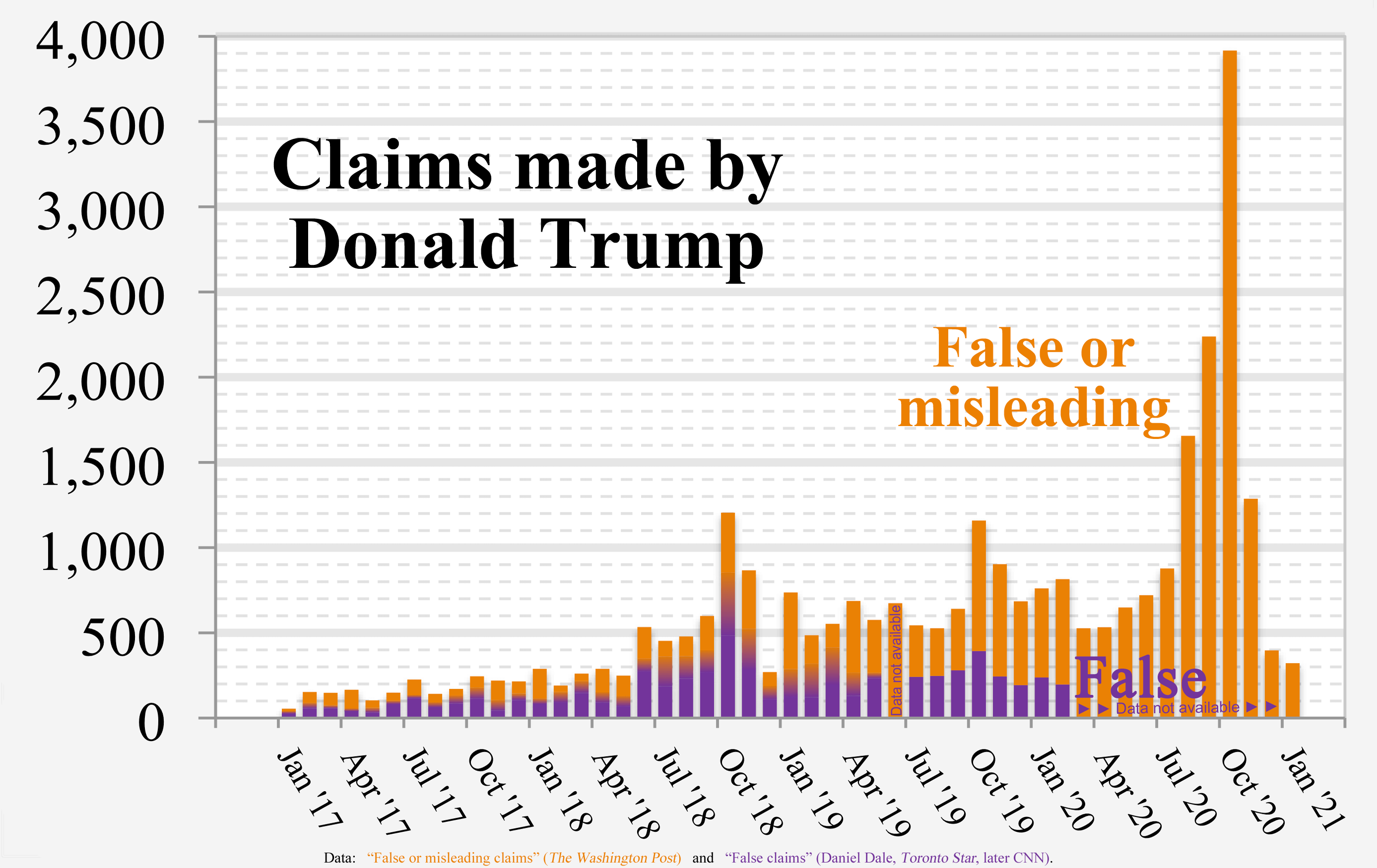
Fact-checkers from The Washington Post (orange), the Toronto Star and CNN (blue) compiled data on "false or misleading claims", and "false claims", respectively. The peaks corresponded in late 2018 to the midterm elections, in late 2019 to his impeachment inquiry, and in late 2020 to the presidential election. The Post reported 30,573 false or misleading claims in four years, an average of more than 20.9 per day.

The number and scale of Trump's statements identified as false by scholars, fact-checkers, and commentators was characterized as unprecedented for an American president, and even in U.S. politics. The New Yorker called falsehoods a distinctive part of his political identity, while Republican political advisor Amanda Carpenter described them as a gaslighting tactic. His White House had dismissed the idea of objective truth, and his campaign and presidency have been described as being "post-truth", and hyper-Orwellian. He disregarded data from federal institutions that was incompatible to his arguments; quoted hearsay, anecdotal evidence, and questionable claims in partisan media; denying reality (including his own statements); and distracting when falsehoods were exposed.

The Washington Post's fact-checking team wrote in 2017 that they could not keep up with "the pace and volume of the president's misstatements." They found that he made more than 30,000 false or misleading claims during his first presidency. Common examples included the economy and jobs, his border wall proposal, his tax legislation, as well as statements regarding prior administrations. Other topics included crime, terrorism, immigration, Russia and the investigation, the Ukraine probe, and the COVID-19 pandemic. Senior administration officials also regularly gave false or misleading statements, which made it difficult for the news media to take official statements seriously.

=== Rule of law ===
Some scholars concluded that during Trump's first presidency, largely due to his actions and rhetoric, the U.S. has experienced democratic backsliding. Prominent Republicans have expressed similar concerns that Trump's perceived disregard for the rule of law betrayed conservative principles.

Early on, Trump wanted the Department of Justice to investigate Hillary Clinton, the Democratic National Committee, and James Comey. He repeated allegations, some of which had already been investigated or debunked. White House counsel Don McGahn advised Trump in 2018 such action would constitute abuse of power and invite possible impeachment. Trump demanded in May 2018 an investigation into whether or not his campaign was infiltrated or surveilled for "political purposes", which was referred to the DOJ inspector general. While it is not illegal, prior presidents have avoided attempts to influence the Department of Justice to prevent perceptions of political interference.

Attorney General Sessions resisted demands by Trump and his allies for such investigations, which frustrated Trump. While criticizing the special counsel investigation in July 2019, Trump falsely claimed that the Constitution ensures that "I have to the right to do whatever I want as president." Trump had on multiple occasions either suggested or promoted views of extending his presidency beyond normal term limits.

Bloomberg News reported in October 2019 that Trump had asked Secretary of State Rex Tillerson to pressure the Justice Department to drop a criminal investigation of Reza Zarrab, which Tillerson refused.

He frequently criticized the judiciary for "unfairly" interfering in his administration's ability to decide policy. Chief Justice Roberts criticized in November 2018 Trump's characterization of a judge who had ruled against him as an "Obama judge". Twenty Republican former U.S. attorneys, including some Republicans, characterized Trump in October 2020 as "a threat to the rule of law in our country." One stated that Trump "views the Justice Department and the FBI as his own personal law firm and investigative agency."

=== Relationship with the news media ===
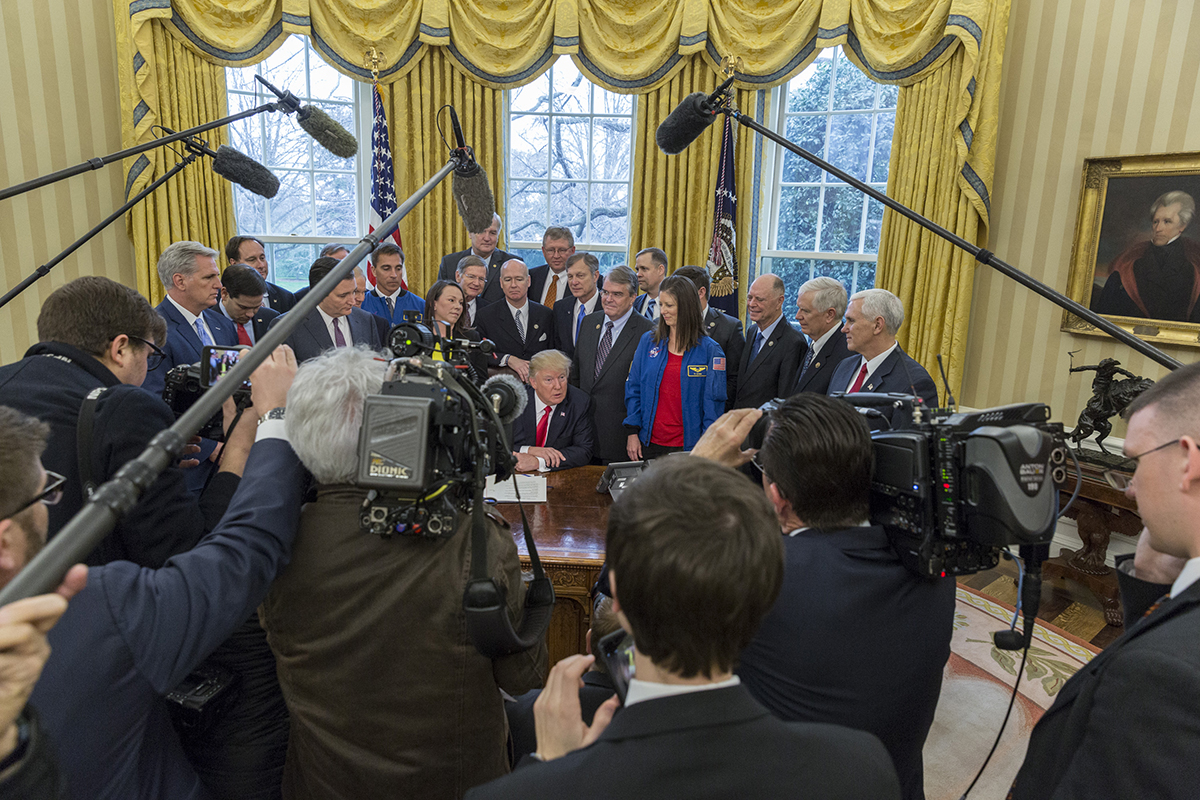
Trump talks to the press in the Oval Office on March 21, 2017, before signing S.422 (the NASA Transition Authorization Act).

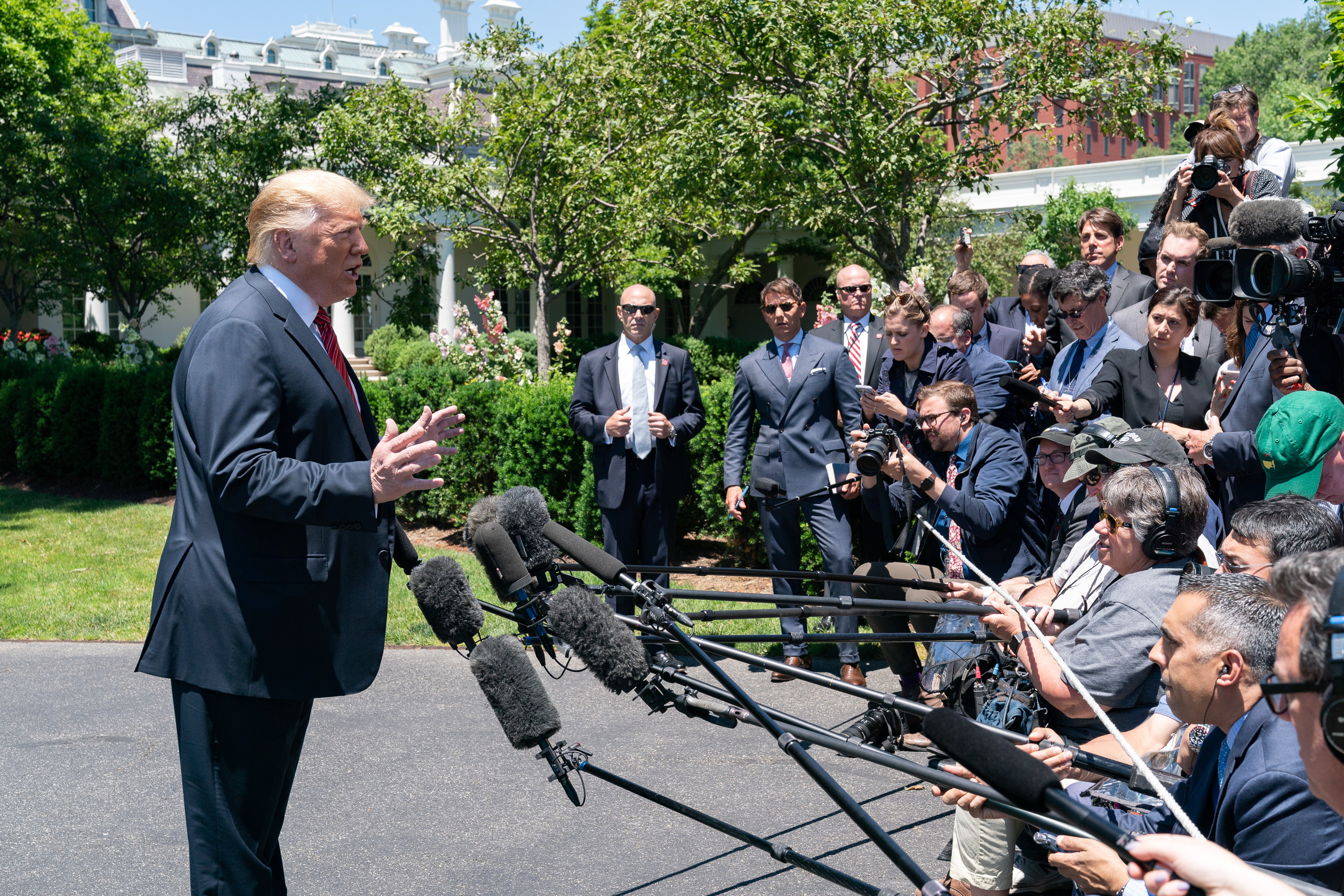
Trump speaks to reporters on the White House South Lawn in June 2019.

Early into his presidency, Trump developed a highly contentious relationship with the news media, repeatedly referring to them as the "fake news media" and "the enemy of the people." As a candidate, Trump had refused press credentials for offending publications but said he would not do so if elected. Trump both privately and publicly mused about taking away critical reporters' White House press credentials. At the same time, the Trump White House gave temporary press passes to far-right pro-Trump fringe outlets, such as InfoWars and The Gateway Pundit, which are known for publishing hoaxes and conspiracy theories.

On his first day in office, Trump falsely accused journalists of understating the size of the crowd at his inauguration and called the news media "among the most dishonest human beings on earth." Trump's claims were notably defended by Press Secretary Sean Spicer, who falsely claimed the inauguration crowd had been the biggest in history, a claim disproven by photographs. Trump's senior adviser Kellyanne Conway then defended Spicer when asked about the falsehood, saying it was an "alternative fact", not a falsehood.

The administration frequently sought to punish and block access for reporters who broke stories about the administration. Trump frequently criticized right-wing media outlet Fox News for being insufficiently supportive of him, threatening to lend his support for alternatives to Fox News on the right. On August 16, 2018, the Senate unanimously passed a resolution affirming that "the press is not the enemy of the people."

The relationship between Trump, the news media, and fake news has been studied. One study found that between October 7 and November 14, 2016, while one in four Americans visited a fake news website, "Trump supporters visited the most fake news websites, which were overwhelmingly pro-Trump" and "almost 6 in 10 visits to fake news websites came from the 10% of people with the most conservative online information diets." Brendan Nyhan, one of the authors of the study, said in an interview, "People got vastly more misinformation from Donald Trump than they did from fake news websites."

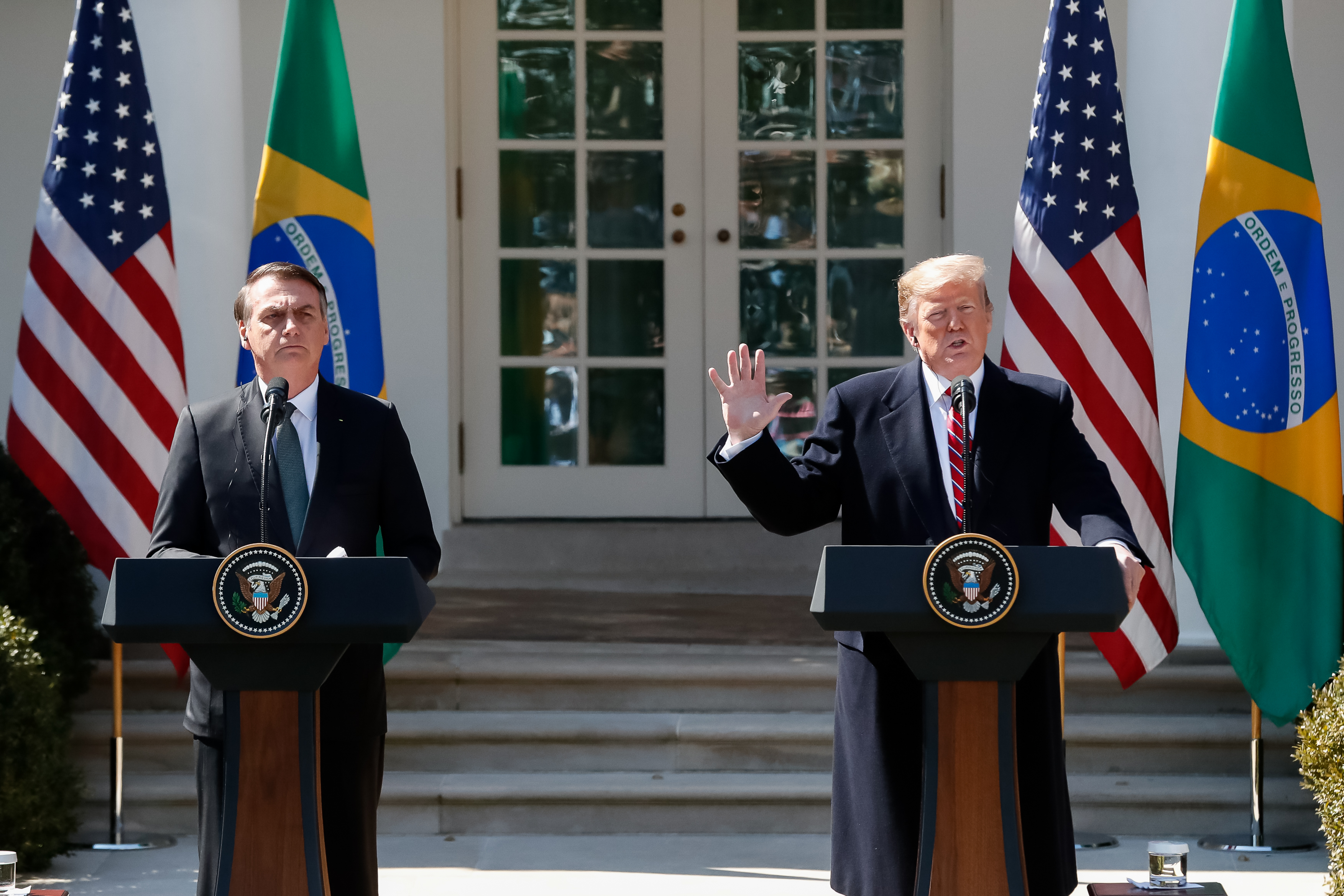
During a joint news conference, Trump said he was "very proud" to hear Brazilian president Jair Bolsonaro use the term "fake news."

In October 2018, Trump praised U.S. representative Greg Gianforte for assaulting political reporter Ben Jacobs in 2017. According to analysts, the incident marked the first time the president has "openly and directly praised a violent act against a journalist on American soil." Later that month, as CNN and prominent Democrats were targeted with mail bombs, Trump initially condemned the bomb attempts but shortly thereafter blamed the "Mainstream Media that I refer to as Fake News" for causing "a very big part of the anger we see today in our society."

The Trump Justice Department obtained by court order the 2017 phone logs or email metadata of reporters from CNN, The New York Times, The Washington Post, BuzzFeed, and Politico as part of investigations into leaks of classified information.

=== Twitter ===
Trump continued his use of Twitter following the presidential campaign. He continued to personally tweet from @realDonaldTrump, his personal account, while his staff tweet on his behalf using the official @POTUS account. His use of Twitter was unconventional for a president, with his tweets initiating controversy and becoming news in their own right. Some scholars have referred to his time in office as the "first true Twitter presidency." The Trump administration described Trump's tweets as "official statements by the President of the United States." The federal judge Naomi Reice Buchwald ruled in 2018 that Trump's blocking of other Twitter users due to opposing political views violated the First Amendment and he must unblock them. The ruling was upheld on appeal.

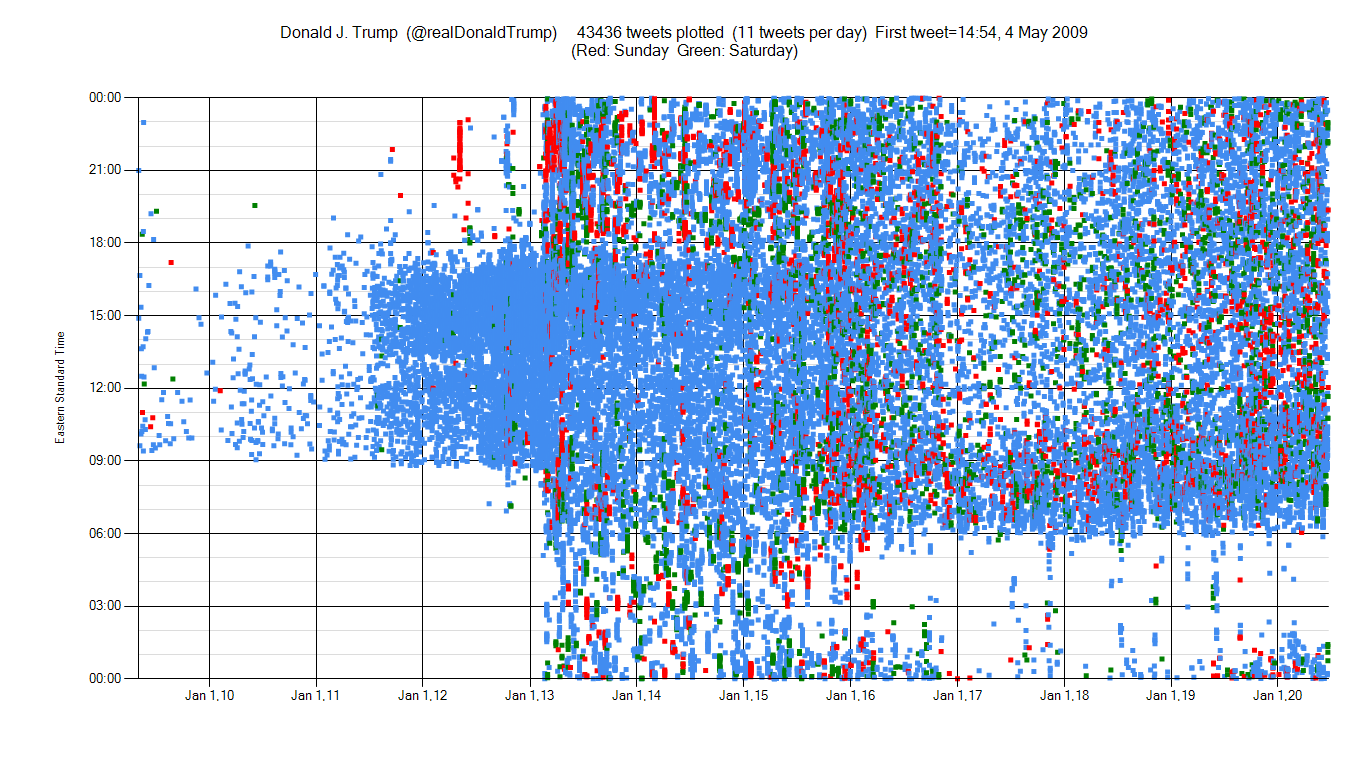
Twitter activity of Donald Trump from his first tweet in May 2009 to September 2017. Retweets are not included.

His tweets have been reported as ill-considered, impulsive, vengeful, and bullying, often being made late at night or in the early hours of the morning. His tweets about a Muslim ban were successfully turned against his administration to halt two versions of travel restrictions from some Muslim-majority countries. He has used Twitter to threaten and intimidate his political opponents and potential political allies needed to pass bills. Many tweets appear to be based on stories Trump has seen in the media, including far-right news websites such as Breitbart and television shows such as Fox & Friends.

Trump used Twitter to attack federal judges who ruled against him in court cases and to criticize officials within his own administration, including then-Secretary of State Rex Tillerson, then-National Security Advisor H. R. McMaster, Deputy Attorney General Rod Rosenstein, and, at various times, Attorney General Jeff Sessions. Tillerson was eventually fired via a tweet by Trump. Trump also tweeted that his Justice Department is part of the American "deep state"; that "there was tremendous leaking, lying and corruption at the highest levels of the FBI, Justice & State" Departments; and that the special counsel investigation is a "WITCH HUNT!" In August 2018, Trump used Twitter to write that Attorney General Jeff Sessions "should stop" the special counsel investigation immediately; he also referred to it as "rigged" and its investigators as biased.

((Twitter Safety))
(@TwitterSafety)
tweeted:

After close review of recent Tweets from the @realDonaldTrump account and the context around them we have permanently suspended the account due to the risk of further incitement of violence.

January 8, 2021

In February 2020, Trump tweeted criticism of the prosecutors' proposed sentence for Trump's former aide Roger Stone. A few hours later, the Justice Department replaced the prosecutors' proposed sentence with a lighter proposal. This gave the appearance of presidential interference in a criminal case and caused a strong negative reaction. All four of the original prosecutors withdrew from the case; more than a thousand former Department of Justice lawyers signed a letter condemning the action. On July 10, Trump commuted the sentence of Stone days before he was due to report to prison.

In response to the mid-2020 George Floyd protests, some of which resulted in looting, Trump tweeted on May 25 that "when the looting starts, the shooting starts." Not long after, Twitter restricted the tweet for violating the company's policy on promoting violence. On May 28, Trump signed an executive order which sought to limit legal protections of social media companies.

On January 8, 2021, Twitter announced that they had permanently suspended Trump's personal account "due to the risk of further incitement of violence" following the Capitol attack. Trump announced in his final tweet before the suspension that he would not attend the inauguration of Joe Biden. Other social media platforms like Facebook, Snapchat, YouTube and others also suspended the official handles of Donald Trump.

== Domestic policy ==
Trump had mixed success in delivering on his domestic policy campaign promises, which included limiting immigration, fortifying public infrastructure, cutting taxes, and repealing the Affordable Care Act. He also worked to encourage space exploration, implement the Tax Cuts and Jobs Act, work on deregulation, address economic growth and unemployment, and work on trade.

Trump was also in office during COVID-19, and directed responses to the pandemic. President Trump also handled relief for three severe hurricanes and several large wildfires and signed the Disaster Recovery Reform Act.

== Foreign policy ==
Trump made 19 international trips to 24 different countries during his first presidency.

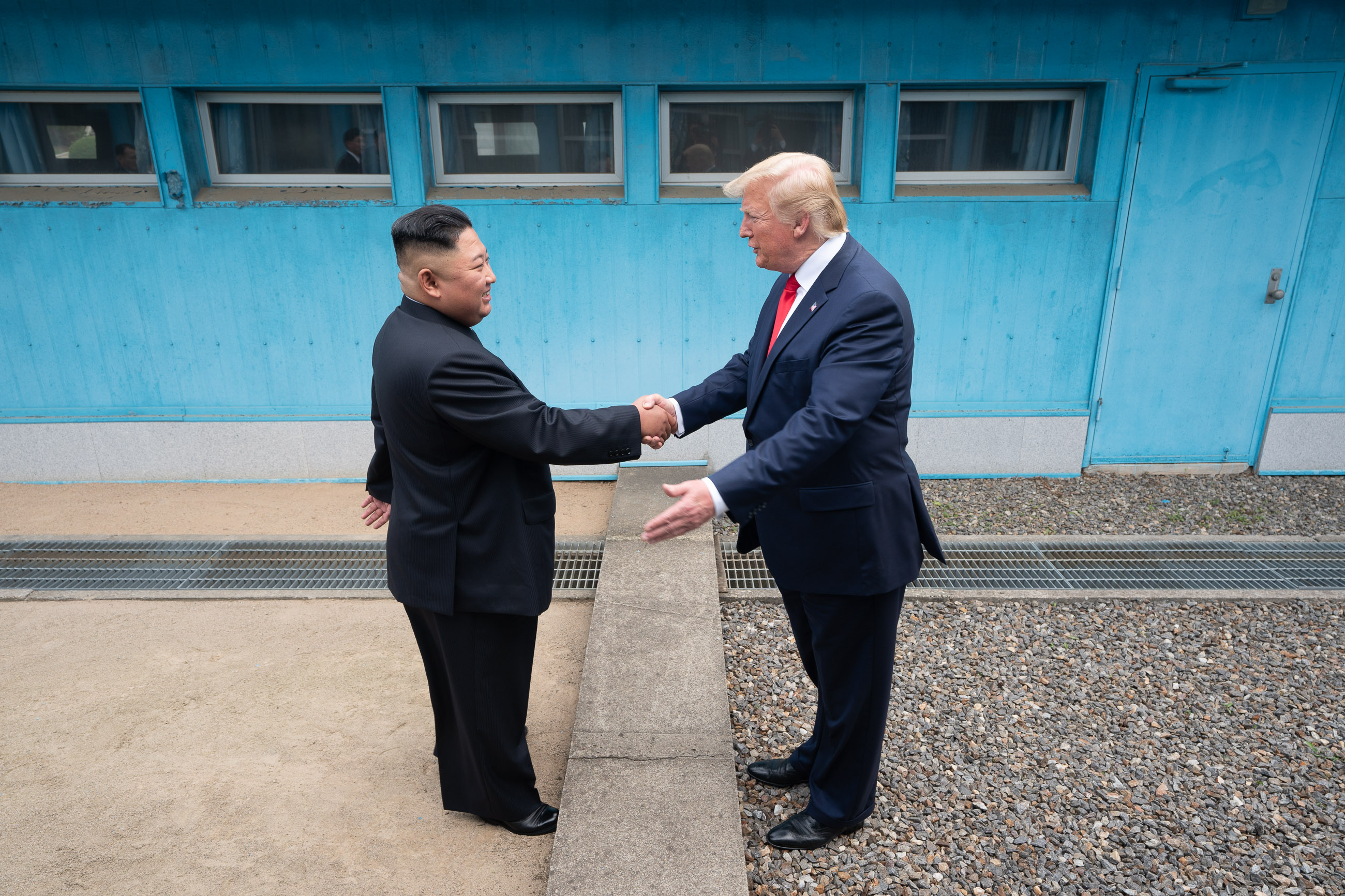
Trump and North Korea's Communist Party leader Kim Jong Un shake hands at the Korean Demilitarized Zone, June 30, 2019

The foreign policy positions expressed by Trump during his presidential campaign changed frequently, so it was "difficult to glean a political agenda, or even a set of clear, core policy values ahead of his presidency". Under a banner of "America First", the Trump administration distinguished itself from past administrations with frequent open admiration of authoritarian rulers and rhetorical rejections of key human rights norms.

Despite pledges to reduce the number of active duty U.S. military personnel deployed overseas, the number was essentially the same three years into Trump's presidency as they were at the end of Obama's.

In August 2019, Trump cancelled a state visit to Denmark by invitation of Queen Margrethe II due to Danish Prime Minister Mette Frederiksen having called Trump's suggestion to purchase Greenland, a territory within the Danish Realm, "an absurd discussion".

On October 27, 2019, ISIS leader Abu Bakr al-Baghdadi killed himself and three children by detonating a suicide vest during the Barisha raid conducted by the U.S. Delta Force in Syria's northwestern Idlib Province.

Trump withdrew from the Open Skies Treaty, a nearly three-decade old agreement promoting transparency of military forces and activities.

=== Defense ===
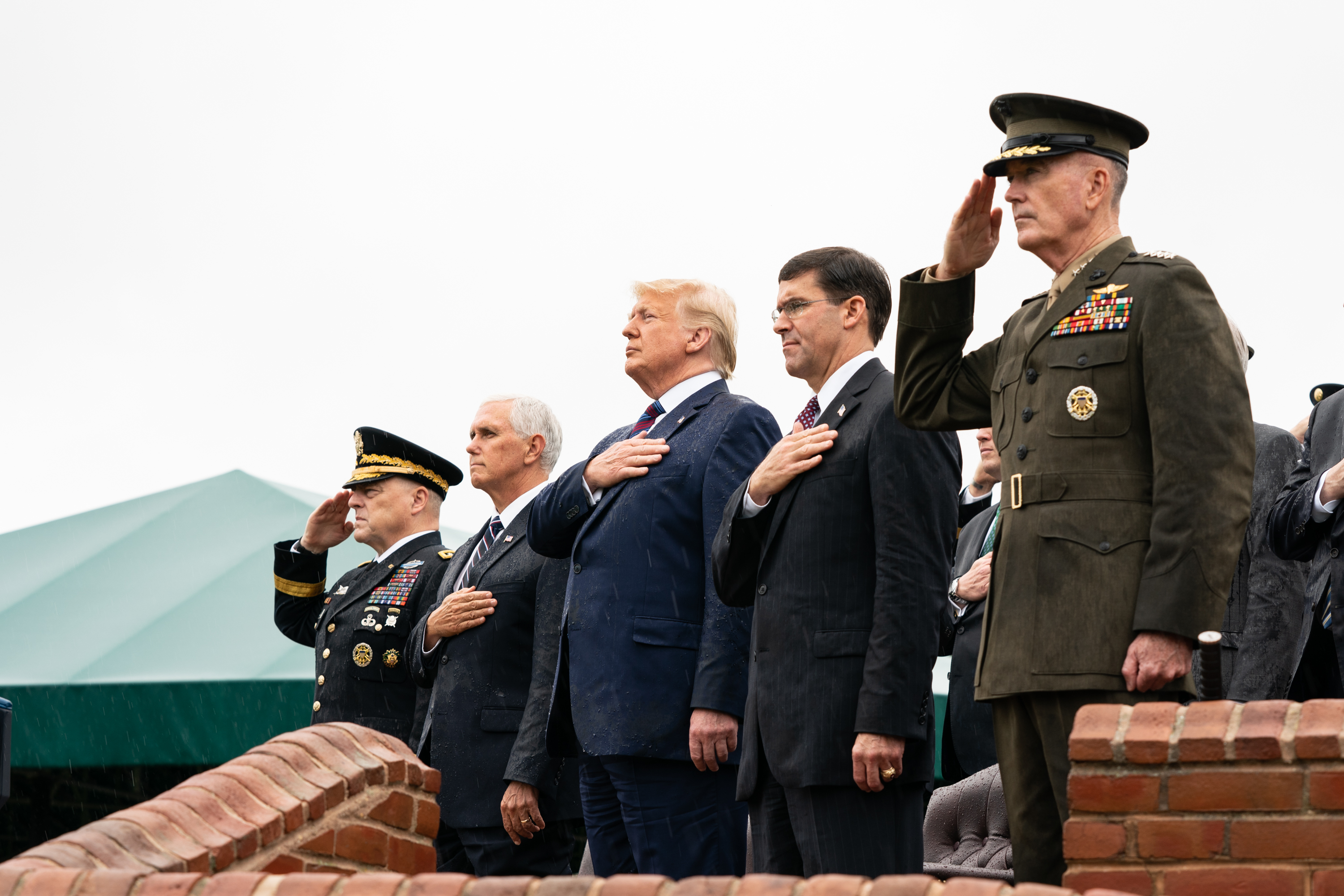
Trump and Vice President Mike Pence at the welcoming ceremony for Chairman of the Joint Chiefs of Staff Mark Milley (left) on September 30, 2019. Outgoing chairman General Joseph Dunford (right) and Secretary of Defense Mark Esper (center-right) are present

As a candidate and as president, Trump called for a major build-up of American military capabilities. Trump announced in October 2018 that the United States would withdraw from the Intermediate-Range Nuclear Forces Treaty with Russia. The goal was to enable the United States to counter increasing Chinese intermediate nuclear missile capabilities in the Pacific. In December 2018, Trump complained about the amount the United States spends on an "uncontrollable arms race" with Russia and China. Trump said that the $716 billion which the United States was spending on the "arms race" was "Crazy!". He had previously praised his own increased defense spending, five months earlier. The total fiscal 2019 defense budget authorization was $716 billion, although missile defense and nuclear programs made up about $10 billion of the total.

During 2018, Trump falsely asserted that he had secured the largest defense budget authorization ever, the first military pay raise in ten years, and that military spending was at least 4.0% of GDP, "which got a lot bigger since I became your president".

Controversy arose in November 2019 after Trump pardoned or promoted three soldiers accused or convicted of war crimes. The most prominent case involved Eddie Gallagher, a Navy SEAL team chief who had been reported to Navy authorities by his own team members for sniping at an unarmed civilian girl and an elderly man. Gallagher faced court martial for the murder of a wounded teenage combatant, among other charges. The medic of his SEAL team was granted immunity to testify against him, but on the witness stand the medic reversed what he had previously told investigators and testified that he himself had murdered the teenage combatant. Gallagher was subsequently acquitted of the murder charge against him, and the Navy demoted him to the lowest possible rank due to his conviction on another charge. The Navy later moved to strip Gallagher of his Trident pin and to eject him from the Navy. Trump intervened to restore Gallagher's rank and pin. Many military officers were enraged by Trump's intervention, as they felt it disrupted principles of military discipline and justice. Secretary of the Navy Richard Spencer protested Trump's intervention and was forced to resign; in his resignation letter, he sharply rebuked Trump for his judgment in the matter. Trump told a rally audience days later, "I stuck up for three great warriors against the deep state."

The Trump administration sharply increased the frequency of drone strikes compared to the preceding Obama administration, in countries such as Afghanistan, Iraq, Somalia, Syria and Yemen, rollbacked transparency in reporting drone strike deaths, and reduced accountability. In March 2019, Trump ended the Obama policy of reporting the number of civilian deaths caused by U.S. drone strikes, claiming that this policy was unnecessary.

=== Afghanistan ===
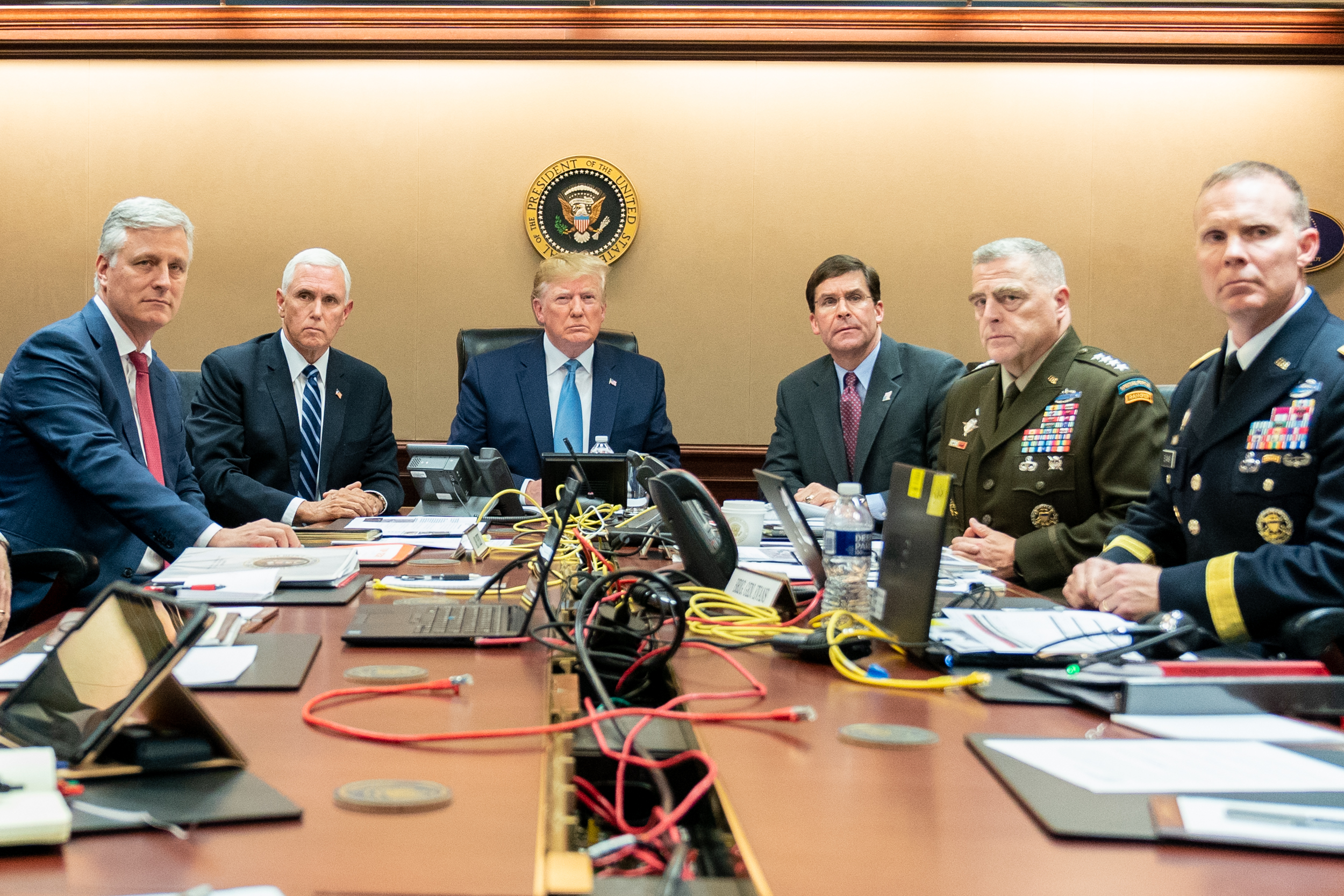
From left: U.S. National Security Advisor Robert O'Brien, Vice President Mike Pence, President Donald Trump, Defense Secretary Mark Esper, Chairman Mark Milley, and Brigadier General Marcus S. Evans overseeing Operation Kayla Mueller in the White House Situation Room, October 26, 2019

The number of U.S. troops deployed to Afghanistan decreased significantly during Trump's presidency. By the end of Trump's term in office troop levels in Afghanistan were at the lowest levels since the early days of the war in 2001. Trump's presidency saw an expansion of drone warfare and a massive increase in civilian casualties from airstrikes in Afghanistan relative to the Obama administration.

In February 2020, the Trump administration signed a deal with the Taliban, which if upheld by the Taliban, would result in the withdrawal of United States troops from Afghanistan by May 2021 (Trump's successor Joe Biden later extended the deadline to September 2021). As part of the deal, the U.S. agreed to the release of 5,000 Taliban members who were imprisoned by the Afghan government; some of these ex-prisoners went on to join the 2021 Taliban offensive that felled the Afghan government.

In 2020, U.S. casualties in Afghanistan reached their lowest level for the entire war. In Iraq, casualties increased, being significantly higher in Trump's term than Obama's second term.

Following the collapse of the Afghan government and the fall of Kabul in August 2021, accusations by Olivia Troye surfaced on Twitter of the Trump Administration deliberately obstructing the visa process for Afghans who had helped U.S. efforts in Afghanistan.

=== China ===
On January 19, 2021, Secretary of State Mike Pompeo announced that the Department of State had determined that "genocide and crimes against humanity" had been perpetrated by China against the Uyghur Muslims and other ethnic minorities in Xinjiang. The announcement was made on the last day of Trump's presidency. The incoming president, Joe Biden, had already declared during his presidential campaign, that such a determination should be made. On January 20, 2021, Pompeo along with other Trump administration officials were sanctioned by China.

=== North Korea ===
After initially adopting a verbally hostile posture toward North Korea and its leader, Kim Jong Un, Trump quickly pivoted to embrace the regime, saying he and Kim "fell in love". Trump engaged Kim by meeting him at two summits, in June 2018 and February 2019, an unprecedented move by an American president, as previous policy had been that a president's simply meeting with the North Korean leader would legitimize the regime on the world stage. During the June 2018 summit, the leaders signed a vague agreement to pursue denuclearization of the Korean peninsula, with Trump immediately declaring "There is no longer a Nuclear Threat from North Korea." Little progress was made toward that goal during the months before the February 2019 summit, which ended abruptly without an agreement, hours after the White House announced a signing ceremony was imminent. During the months between the summits, a growing body of evidence indicated North Korea was continuing its nuclear fuel, bomb and missile development, including by redeveloping an ICBM site it was previously appearing to dismantle – even while the second summit was underway. In the aftermath of the February 2019 failed summit, the Treasury department imposed additional sanctions on North Korea. The following day, Trump tweeted, "It was announced today by the U.S. Treasury that additional large scale Sanctions would be added to those already existing Sanctions on North Korea. I have today ordered the withdrawal of those additional Sanctions!" On December 31, 2019, the Korean Central News Agency announced that Kim had abandoned his moratoriums on nuclear and intercontinental ballistic missile tests, quoting Kim as saying, "the world will witness a new strategic weapon to be possessed by the DPRK in the near future." Two years after the Singapore summit, the North Korean nuclear arsenal had significantly expanded.

During a June 2019 visit to South Korea, Trump visited the Korean Demilitarized Zone and invited North Korean leader Kim Jong Un to meet him there, which he did, and Trump became the first sitting president to step inside North Korea. (Note: Trump later falsely asserted, "President Obama wanted to meet and chairman Kim would not meet him. The Obama administration was begging for a meeting.")

=== Turkey ===
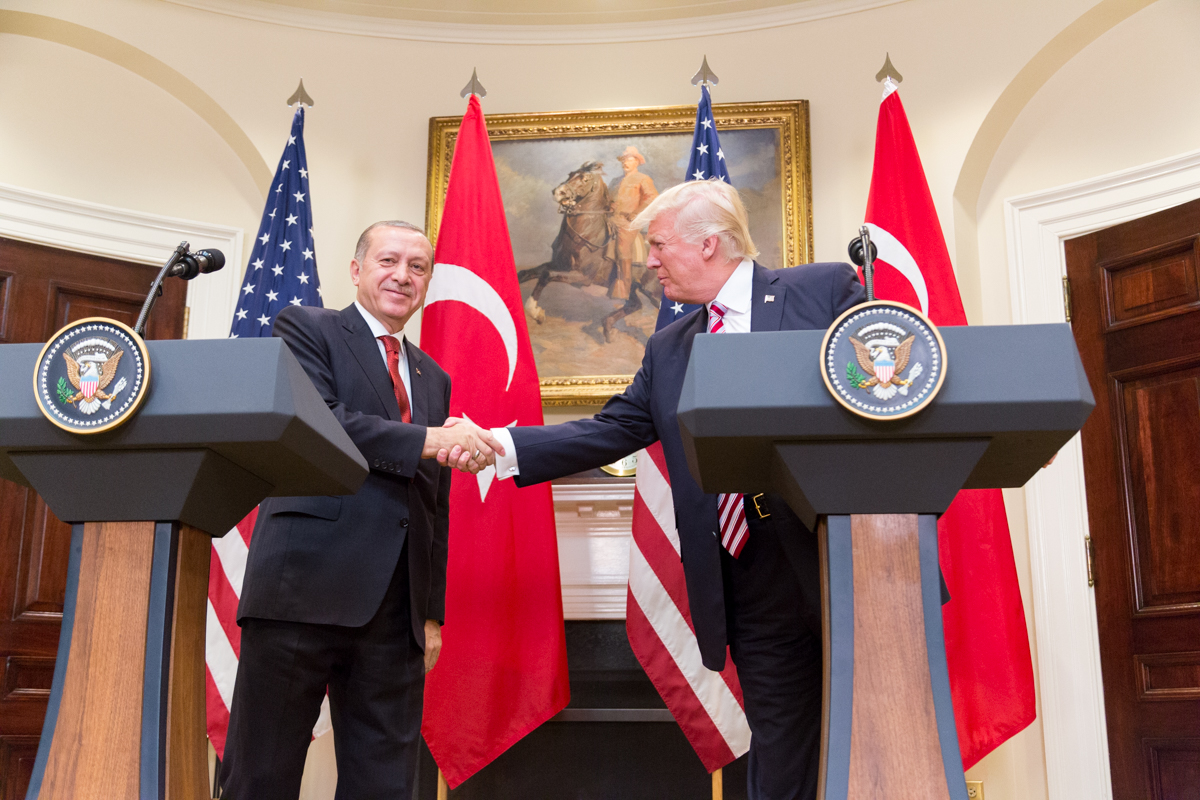
Trump with Turkish president Recep Tayyip Erdoğan, May 16, 2017

In October 2019, after Trump spoke to Turkish president Recep Tayyip Erdoğan, the White House acknowledged that Turkey would be carrying out a planned military offensive into northern Syria; as such, U.S. troops in northern Syria were withdrawn from the area to avoid interference with that operation. The statement also passed responsibility for the area's captured ISIS fighters to Turkey. Congress members of both parties denounced the move, including Republican allies of Trump like Senator Lindsey Graham. They argued that the move betrayed the American-allied Kurds, and would benefit ISIS, Russia, Iran and Bashar al-Assad's Syrian regime. Trump defended the move, citing the high cost of supporting the Kurds, and the lack of support from the Kurds in past U.S. wars. Within a week of the U.S. pullout, Turkey proceeded to attack Kurdish-controlled areas in northeast Syria. Kurdish forces then announced an alliance with the Syrian government and its Russian allies, in a united effort to repel Turkey.

=== Iran ===
During the first Trump administration, U.S.–Iran relations deteriorated sharply as Trump abandoned Obama's engagement strategy. The U.S. withdrew from the nuclear deal (JCPOA), reimposed sanctions, and launched a maximum pressure campaign that imposed over 1,500 sanctions and severely damaged Iran's economy. In response, Iran escalated uranium enrichment and ruled out talks. Tensions rose through 2019 with oil tanker attacks, a downed U.S. drone, and cyber retaliation. The crisis peaked in early 2020 after the U.S. killed Iranian General Qasem Soleimani, prompting Iranian missile strikes. Relations remained hostile through the end of Trump's term.

=== Saudi Arabia ===
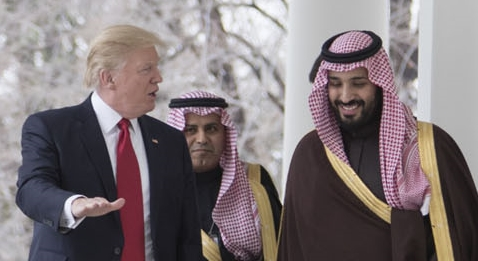
Trump with Prince Mohammad bin Salman, Washington, D.C., March 14, 2017

Trump actively supported the Saudi Arabian-led intervention in Yemen against the Houthis. Trump also praised his relationship with Saudi Arabia's powerful Crown Prince Mohammad bin Salman. On May 20, 2017, Trump and Saudi Arabia's King Salman bin Abdulaziz Al Saud signed a series of letters of intent for the Kingdom of Saudi Arabia to purchase arms from the United States totaling $110 billion immediately, and $350 billion over ten years. The transfer was widely seen as a counterbalance against the influence of Iran in the region and a "significant" and "historic" expansion of United States relations with Saudi Arabia. By July 2019, two of Trump's three vetoes were to overturn bipartisan congressional action related to Saudi Arabia.

In October 2018, amid widespread condemnation of Saudi Arabia for the murder of prominent Saudi journalist and dissident Jamal Khashoggi, the Trump administration pushed back on the condemnation. After the CIA assessed that Saudi crown prince Mohammad bin Salman ordered the murder of Khashoggi, Trump rejected the assessment and said the CIA only had "feelings" on the matter.

=== Israel / Palestine ===
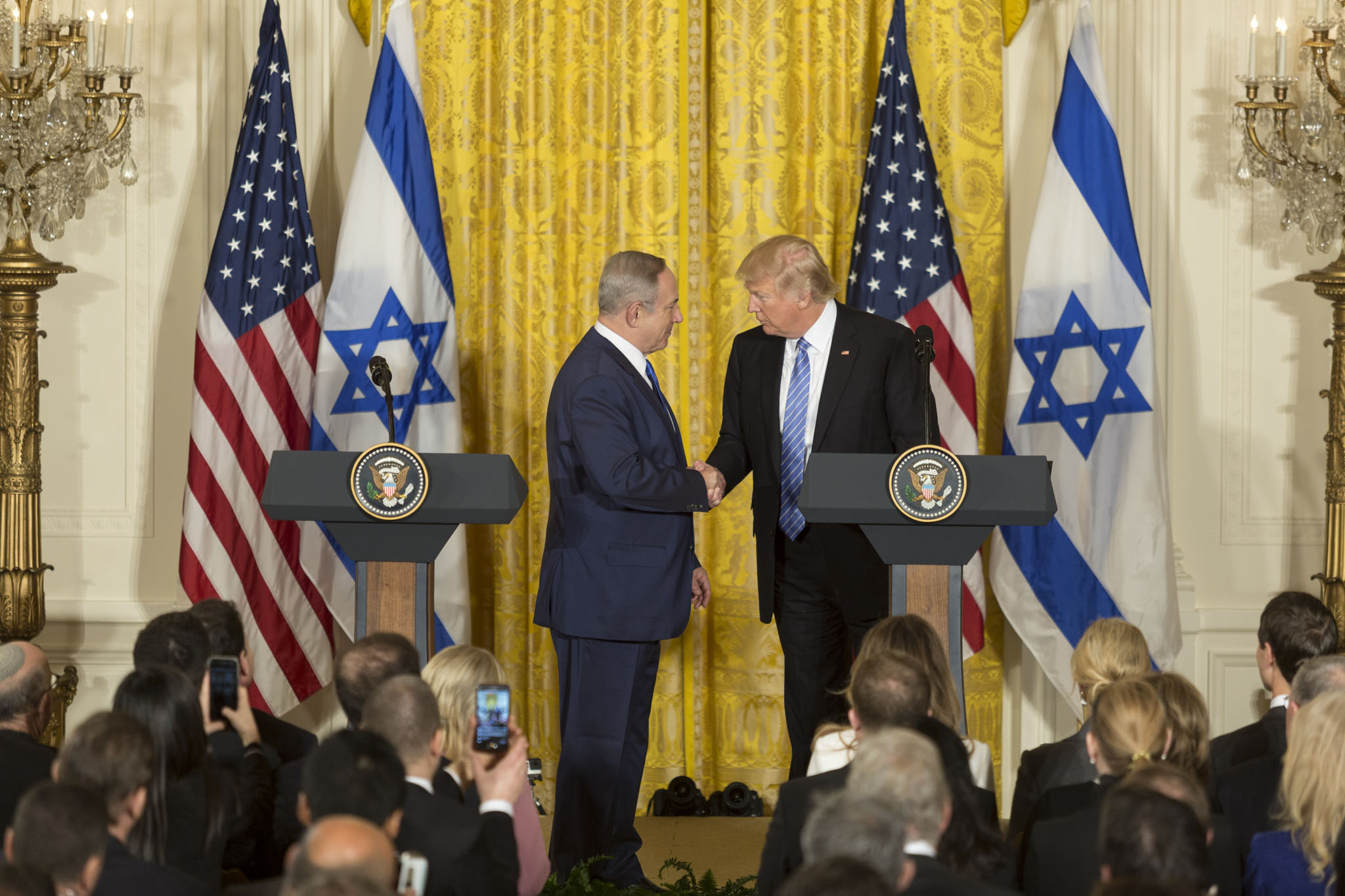
Trump with Israeli prime minister Benjamin Netanyahu, February 15, 2017

Since the Six Day War in 1967, the United States had considered Israeli settlements in the occupied West Bank to be "illegitimate". This status changed in November 2019 when the Trump administration shifted U.S. policy and declared "the establishment of Israeli civilian settlements in the West Bank is not per se inconsistent with international law."

Trump unveiled his own peace plan to resolve the Israeli–Palestinian conflict on January 28, 2020. A step toward improved relations in the region occurred in August 2020 with the first of the Abraham Accords, when Israel and the United Arab Emirates agreed to begin normalizing relations in an agreement brokered by Jared Kushner, an accomplishment described by Foreign Policy as "arguably his administration's first unqualified diplomatic success". The following month, Israel and Bahrain agreed to normalize diplomatic relations in another deal mediated and brokered by the Trump administration. A month later, Israel and Sudan agreed to normalize relations in a third such agreement in as many months. On December 10, 2020, Trump announced that Israel and Morocco had agreed to establish full diplomatic relations, while also announcing that the United States recognized Morocco's claim over the disputed territory of Western Sahara.

=== United Arab Emirates ===
As Donald Trump lost the election bid against Joe Biden, the U.S. State Department notified Congress about its plans to sell 18 sophisticated armed MQ-9B aerial drones to the United Arab Emirates, under a deal worth $2.9 billion. The drones were expected to be equipped with maritime radar, and the delivery was being estimated by 2024. Besides, another informal notification was sent to the Congress regarding the plans of providing the UAE with $10 billion of defense equipment, including precision-guided munitions, non-precision bombs and missiles.

== Russia and related investigations ==
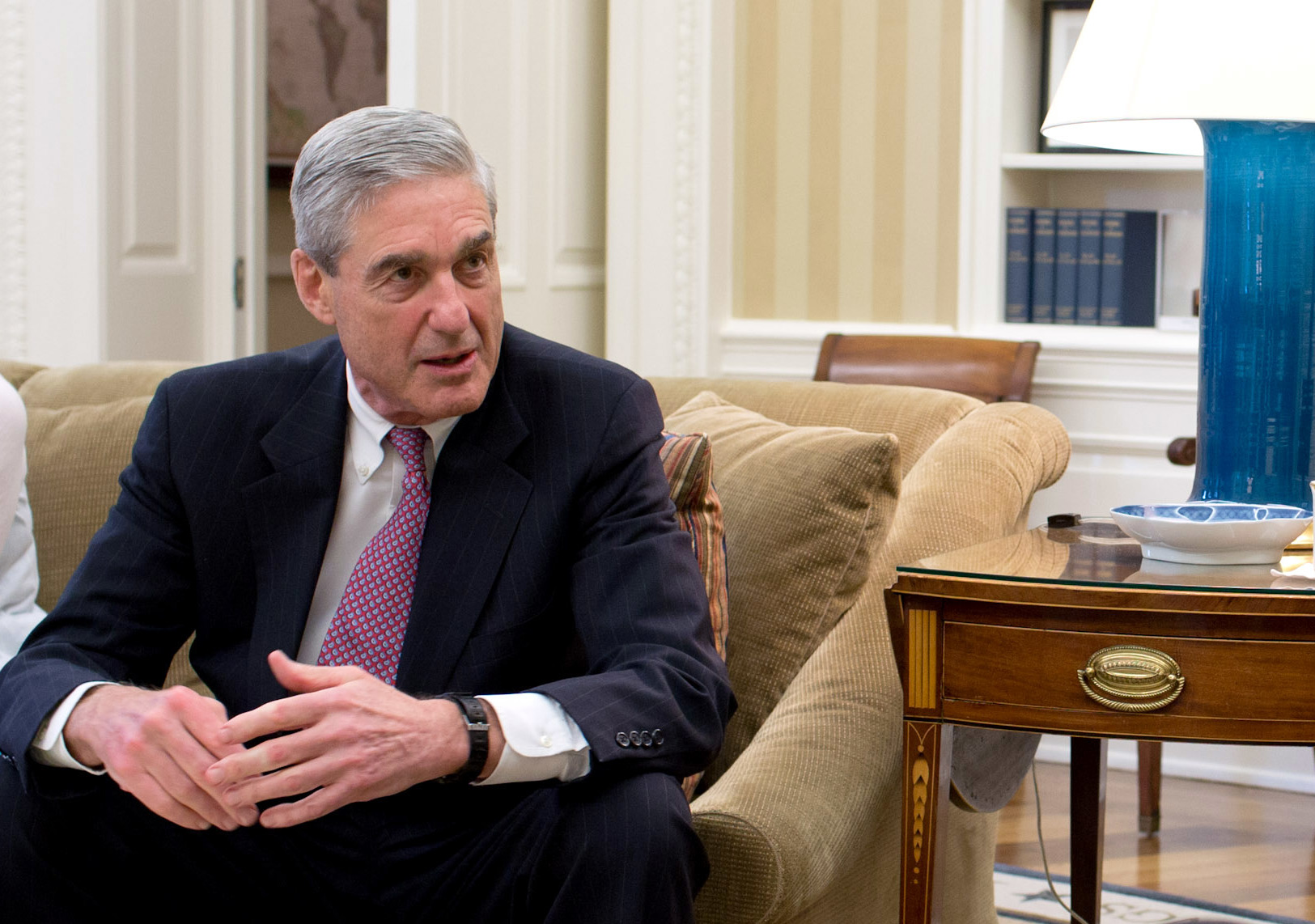
Robert Mueller in the Oval Office c. 2012

American intelligence sources found the Russian government attempted to intervene in the 2016 presidential election to favor the election of Trump, and that members of Trump's campaign were in contact with Russian government officials both before and after the election. In May 2017, the Department of Justice appointed Robert Mueller as special counsel to investigate "any links and/or coordination between Russian government and individuals associated with the campaign of President Donald Trump, and any matters that arose or may arise directly from the investigation".

During his January 2017 confirmation hearings as the attorney general nominee before the Senate, then-Senator Jeff Sessions appeared to deliberately omit two meetings he had in 2016 with Russian ambassador Sergey Kislyak, when asked if he had meetings involving the 2016 election with Russian government officials. Sessions later amended his testimony saying he "never met with any Russian officials to discuss issues of the campaign". Following his amended statement, Sessions recused himself from any investigation regarding connections between Trump and Russia.

In May 2017, Trump discussed highly classified intelligence in an Oval Office meeting with the Russian foreign minister Sergey Lavrov and ambassador Sergey Kislyak, providing details that could expose the source of the information and how it was collected. A Middle Eastern ally (Note: Revealed to be Israel the day after publication in the press.) provided the intelligence which had the highest level of classification and was not intended to be shared widely. The New York Times reported, "sharing the information without the express permission of the ally who provided it was a major breach of espionage etiquette, and could jeopardize a crucial intelligence-sharing relationship." The White House, through National Security Advisor H. R. McMaster, issued a limited denial, saying the story "as reported" was incorrect and that no "intelligence sources or methods" were discussed. McMaster did not deny that information had been disclosed. The following day Trump said on Twitter that Russia is an important ally against terrorism and that he had an "absolute right" to share classified information with Russia. Soon after the meeting, American intelligence extracted a high-level covert source from within the Russian government, on concerns the individual could be at risk due, in part, to Trump and his administration repeatedly mishandling classified intelligence.

In October 2017, former Trump campaign advisor George Papadopoulos pleaded guilty to one count of making false statements to the FBI regarding his contacts with Russian agents. During the campaign he had tried repeatedly but unsuccessfully to set up meetings in Russia between Trump campaign representatives and Russian officials.

Trump went to great lengths to keep details of his private conversations with Russian president Putin secret, including in one case by retaining his interpreter's notes and instructing the linguist to not share the contents of the discussions with anyone in the administration. As a result, there were no detailed records, even in classified files, of Trump's conversations with Putin on five occasions.

Of Trump's campaign advisors and staff, six of them were indicted by the special counsel's office; five of them (Michael Cohen, Michael Flynn, Rick Gates, Paul Manafort, George Papadopoulos) pleaded guilty, while one has pleaded not guilty (Roger Stone). As of December 2020, Stone, Papadopoulos, Manafort, and Flynn have been pardoned by Trump, but not Cohen or Gates.

On June 12, 2019, Trump asserted he saw nothing wrong in accepting intelligence on his political adversaries from foreign powers, such as Russia, and he could see no reason to contact the FBI about it. Responding to a reporter who told him FBI director Christopher Wray had said such activities should be reported to the FBI, Trump said, "the FBI director is wrong." Trump elaborated, "there's nothing wrong with listening. If somebody called from a country, Norway, 'we have information on your opponent' – oh, I think I'd want to hear it." Both Democrats and Republicans repudiated the remarks.

The New York Times reported in June 2021 that in 2017 and 2018 the Justice Department subpoenaed metadata from the iCloud accounts of at least a dozen individuals associated with the House Intelligence Committee, including that of ranking Democratic member Adam Schiff and Eric Swalwell, and family members, to investigate leaks to the press about contacts between Trump associates and Russia. Records of the inquiry did not implicate anyone associated with the committee, but upon becoming attorney general Bill Barr revived the effort, including by appointing a federal prosecutor and about six others in February 2020. The Times reported that, apart from corruption investigations, subpoenaing communications information of members of Congress is nearly unheard-of, and that some in the Justice Department saw Barr's approach as politically motivated. Justice Department Inspector General Michael Horowitz announced an inquiry into the matter the day after the Times report.

=== Special counsel's report ===
In February 2018, when Mueller indicted more than a dozen Russians and three entities for interference in the 2016 election, Trump asserted the indictment was proof his campaign did not collude with the Russians. The New York Times noted Trump "voiced no concern that a foreign power had been trying for nearly four years to upend American democracy, much less resolve to stop it from continuing to do so this year".

In July 2018, the special counsel indicted twelve Russian intelligence operatives and accused them of conspiring to interfere in the 2016 U.S. elections, by hacking servers and emails of the Democratic Party and the Hillary Clinton 2016 presidential campaign. The indictments were made before Trump's meeting with Putin in Helsinki, in which Trump supported Putin's denial that Russia was involved and criticized American law enforcement and intelligence community (subsequently Trump partially walked back some of his comments). A few days later, it was reported that Trump had actually been briefed on the veracity and extent of Russian cyber-attacks two weeks before his inauguration, back in December 2016, including the fact that these were ordered by Putin himself. The evidence presented to him at the time included text and email conversations between Russian military officers as well as information from a source close to Putin.

The redacted version of the Mueller report was released to the public by the Department of Justice on April 18, 2019

On March 22, 2019, Mueller submitted the final report to Attorney General William Barr. Two days later, Barr sent Congress a four-page letter, describing what he said were the special counsel's principal conclusions in the report. Barr added that, since the special counsel "did not draw a conclusion" on obstruction, this "leaves it to the Attorney General to determine whether the conduct described in the report constitutes a crime". Barr continued: "Deputy Attorney General Rod Rosenstein and I have concluded that the evidence developed during the Special Counsel's investigation is not sufficient to establish that the President committed an obstruction-of-justice offense."

On April 18, 2019, a two-volume redacted version of the special counsel's report titled Report on the Investigation into Russian interference in the 2016 Presidential Election was released to Congress and to the public. About one-eighth of the lines in the public version were redacted.

Volume I discusses about Russian interference in the 2016 presidential election, concluding that interference occurred "in sweeping and systematic fashion" and "violated U.S. criminal law". The report detailed activities by the Internet Research Agency, a Kremlin-linked Russian troll farm, to create a "social media campaign that favored presidential candidate Donald J. Trump and disparaged presidential candidate Hillary Clinton", and to "provoke and amplify political and social discord in the United States". The report also described how the Russian intelligence service, the GRU, performed computer hacking and strategic releasing of damaging material from the Clinton campaign and Democratic Party organizations. To establish whether a crime was committed by members of the Trump campaign with regard to Russian interference, investigators used the legal standard for criminal conspiracy rather than the popular concept of "collusion", because a crime of "collusion" is not found in criminal law or the United States Code.

According to the report, the investigation "identified numerous links between the Russian government and the Trump campaign", and found that Russia had "perceived it would benefit from a Trump presidency" and the 2016 Trump presidential campaign "expected it would benefit electorally" from Russian hacking efforts. Ultimately, "the investigation did not establish that members of the Trump campaign conspired or coordinated with the Russian government in its election interference activities." However, investigators had an incomplete picture of what had really occurred during the 2016 campaign, due to some associates of the Trump campaign providing false or incomplete testimony, exercising the privilege against self-incrimination, and having deleted, unsaved, or encrypted communications. As such, the Mueller report "cannot rule out the possibility" that information then unavailable to investigators would have presented different findings.

Volume II covered obstruction of justice. The report described ten episodes where Trump may have obstructed justice as president, plus one instance before he was elected. The report said that in addition to Trump's public attacks on the investigation and its subjects, he had also privately tried to "control the investigation" in multiple ways, but mostly failed to influence it because his subordinates or associates refused to carry out his instructions. For that reason, no charges against the Trump's aides and associates were recommended "beyond those already filed". The special counsel could not charge Trump himself once investigators decided to abide by an Office of Legal Counsel (OLC) opinion that a sitting president cannot stand trial, and they feared charges would affect Trump's governing and possibly preempt his impeachment. In addition, investigators felt it would be unfair to accuse Trump of a crime without charges and without a trial in which he could clear his name, hence investigators "determined not to apply an approach that could potentially result in a judgment that the President committed crimes".

Since the special counsel's office had decided "not to make a traditional prosecutorial judgment" on whether to "initiate or decline a prosecution", they "did not draw ultimate conclusions about the President's conduct". The report "does not conclude that the president committed a crime", but specifically did not exonerate Trump on obstruction of justice, because investigators were not confident that Trump was innocent after examining his intent and actions. The report concluded "that Congress has authority to prohibit a President's corrupt use of his authority in order to protect the integrity of the administration of justice" and "that Congress may apply the obstruction laws to the president's corrupt exercise of the powers of office accords with our constitutional system of checks and balances and the principle that no person is above the law".

On May 1, 2019, following publication of the special counsel's report, Barr testified before the Senate Judiciary Committee, during which Barr said he "didn't exonerate" Trump on obstruction as that was not the role of the Justice Department. He declined to testify before the House Judiciary Committee the following day because he objected to the committee's plan to use staff lawyers during questioning. Barr also repeatedly failed to give the unredacted special counsel's report to the Judiciary Committee by its deadline of May 6, 2019. On May 8, 2019, the committee voted to hold Barr in contempt of Congress, which refers the matter to entire House for resolution. Concurrently, Trump asserted executive privilege via the Department of Justice in an effort to prevent the redacted portions of the special counsel's report and the underlying evidence from being disclosed. Committee chairman Jerry Nadler said the U.S. is in a constitutional crisis, "because the President is disobeying the law, is refusing all information to Congress". Speaker Nancy Pelosi said Trump was "self-impeaching" by stonewalling Congress.

Following release of the Mueller report, Trump and his allies turned their attention toward "investigating the investigators". On May 23, 2019, Trump ordered the intelligence community to cooperate with Barr's investigation of the origins of the investigation, granting Barr full authority to declassify any intelligence information related to the matter. Some analysts expressed concerns that the order could create a conflict between the Justice Department and the intelligence community over closely guarded intelligence sources and methods, as well as open the possibility Barr could cherrypick intelligence for public release to help Trump.

Upon announcing the formal closure of the investigation and his resignation from the Justice Department on May 29, Mueller said, "If we had had confidence that the president clearly did not commit a crime, we would have said so. We did not, however, decide as to whether the president did commit a crime." During his testimony to Congress on July 24, 2019, Mueller said that a president could be charged with obstruction of justice (or other crimes) after the president left office.

=== Counter-investigations ===
Amid accusations by Trump and his supporters that he had been subjected to an illegitimate investigation, in May 2019, Barr appointed federal prosecutor John Durham to review the origins of the Crossfire Hurricane investigation. By September 2020, Durham's inquiry had expanded to include the FBI's investigation of the Clinton Foundation during the 2016 campaign.

In November 2017, Sessions appointed U.S. Attorney John Huber to investigate the FBI's surveillance of Carter Page and connections between the Clinton Foundation and Uranium One, starting in November 2017. The investigation ended in January 2020 after no evidence was found to warrant the opening of a criminal investigation. Special Counsel Robert Mueller's April 2019 report documented that Trump pressured Sessions and the Department of Justice to reopen the investigation into Clinton's emails.

== Ethics ==
The Trump administration was characterized by a departure from ethical norms. Unlike previous administrations of both parties, the Trump White House did not observe a strict boundary between official government activities and personal, political, or campaign activities. Critics went so far as to describe Trump as bringing kleptocracy to America. (Note: Multiple sources:)

=== Role of lobbyists ===
Trump promised during his campaign to "drain the swamp" – referring to entrenched corruption and lobbying in Washington, D.C. – and proposed a series of ethics reforms. Among the administration's first policies was a five-year ban on serving as a lobbyist after working in the executive branch. However, he rolled back that policy as one of his final acts in office. According to federal records and interviews, lobbying during the presidency, particularly through Pence's office, nearly doubled.

=== Potential conflicts of interest ===
Map shows the number of companies owned by Donald Trump that are operating in each country: 1-3 4-8 9-15 Over 15

Trump's presidency caused concerns about conflict of interest with his business ventures. He moved his businesses into a revocable trust, placing his sons, Eric Trump and Donald Trump Jr., at the head of his businesses. However, critics said this would not prevent his input into his businesses and benefitting himself, and he continued to receive quarterly updates on his businesses.

Ethics experts found his plan to address conflicts of interest between his presidency and his business interests to be inadequate. He did not put his business interests in a blind trust or similar, unlike every other president in the last 40 years. He still owned stakes in hundreds of businesses a year into his presidency. Journalist Anne Applebaum reported how Trump properties raised conflicts of interest. The Washington Post reported in a June 2019 analysis that federal officials and GOP campaigns had spent at least $1.6 million at businesses owned by Trump during the first few months of his presidency. The newspaper reported in 2020 that the federal government was also charged over $1 million over the course of the term for officials staying at the properties when Trump visited his properties well over 200 times during his presidency.

Citizens for Responsibility and Ethics in Washington (CREW), the District of Columbia and State of Maryland jointly, and over 200 Democratic members of congress initiated three separate lawsuits against Trump for violations of the Foreign Emoluments Clause in 2017. CREW v. Trump was dismissed the same year for lack of standing. The U.S. Supreme Court dismissed the remaining two lawsuits in January 2021 as Trump was no longer president.

=== Transparency, data availability, and record keeping ===
The Trump administration stopped the longstanding practice of logging visitors to the White House. CNN reported in July 2018 that the White House had ceased publishing public summaries of Trump's phone calls with world leaders, which was common practice in previous administrations. The Washington Post reported in May 2017 that information, such as "workplace violations, energy efficiency, and animal welfare abuses" had been removed or tucked away.

He refused to follow the Presidential Records Act, which requires presidents and their administrations to preserve all official documents for the National Archives. He tore up papers after reading them, and staffers had to collect and tape them back together for the archives. He also took boxes of documents and other items with him when he left the White House, which were later returned. Some of these documents were classified, including at the "top secret" level. Trump sometimes used his personal cellphone to converse with world leaders to avoid record of the conversation. Federal prosecutors empaneled a grand jury in May 2022 to investigate possible mishandling of documents by Trump and other officials in his White House.

=== Hatch Act violations ===
The Office of Special Counsel found 13 senior Trump administration officials in violation of the Hatch Act of 1939, which restricts unelected government employees' involvement in politics, having demonstrated "willful disregard" for the Hatch Act, especially during the 2020 campaign.

=== Security clearances ===
Tricia Newbold, a White House employee working on security clearances, privately told the House Oversight Committee in March 2019 that at least 25 Trump administration officials had been granted security clearances over the objections of career staffers. She also asserted that some of these officials' applications were rejected for "disqualifying issues", which were overturned with inadequate explanation.

The House Oversight Committee subpoenaed former head of White House security clearances Carl Kline, but the administration instructed him not to comply, asserting that the subpoena "unconstitutionally encroaches on fundamental executive branch interests". He eventually gave closed-door testimony before the committee in May 2019, but House Democrats said he did not "provide specific details to their questions".

=== Impeachment inquiry ===
An intelligence official privately filed a whistleblower complaint with the Inspector General of the Intelligence Community, Michael Atkinson, on August 12, 2019. The complaint alleged that in a July 2019 call, Trump had asked Ukrainian president Volodymyr Zelenskyy to investigate potential 2020 rival presidential candidate Joe Biden and his son Hunter Biden to improve his own electoral chances in 2020, as well as investigate the hacking of Democratic National Committee servers, which had been blamed on Russia. Additionally, the whistleblower alleged that the White House attempted to cover up the call records, and that the cancelling Vice President Mike Pence's May 2019 Ukraine trip, and withholding of financial aid from Ukraine was intended to pressure Zelenskyy.

Inspector General Atkinson found the complaint credible and urgent, and transmitted it to acting Director of National Intelligence Joseph Maguire on August 26. By law, Maguire was supposed to forward the complaint to the Senate and House Intelligence Committees within a week, but refused, so Atkinson informed the committees of the existence of the complaint, but not its content.

Trump confirmed on September 22 that he had discussed Biden and corruption with Zelenskyy, defending the call. Trump also confirmed temporarily withholding aid from Ukraine, offering contradicting reasons for the decision.

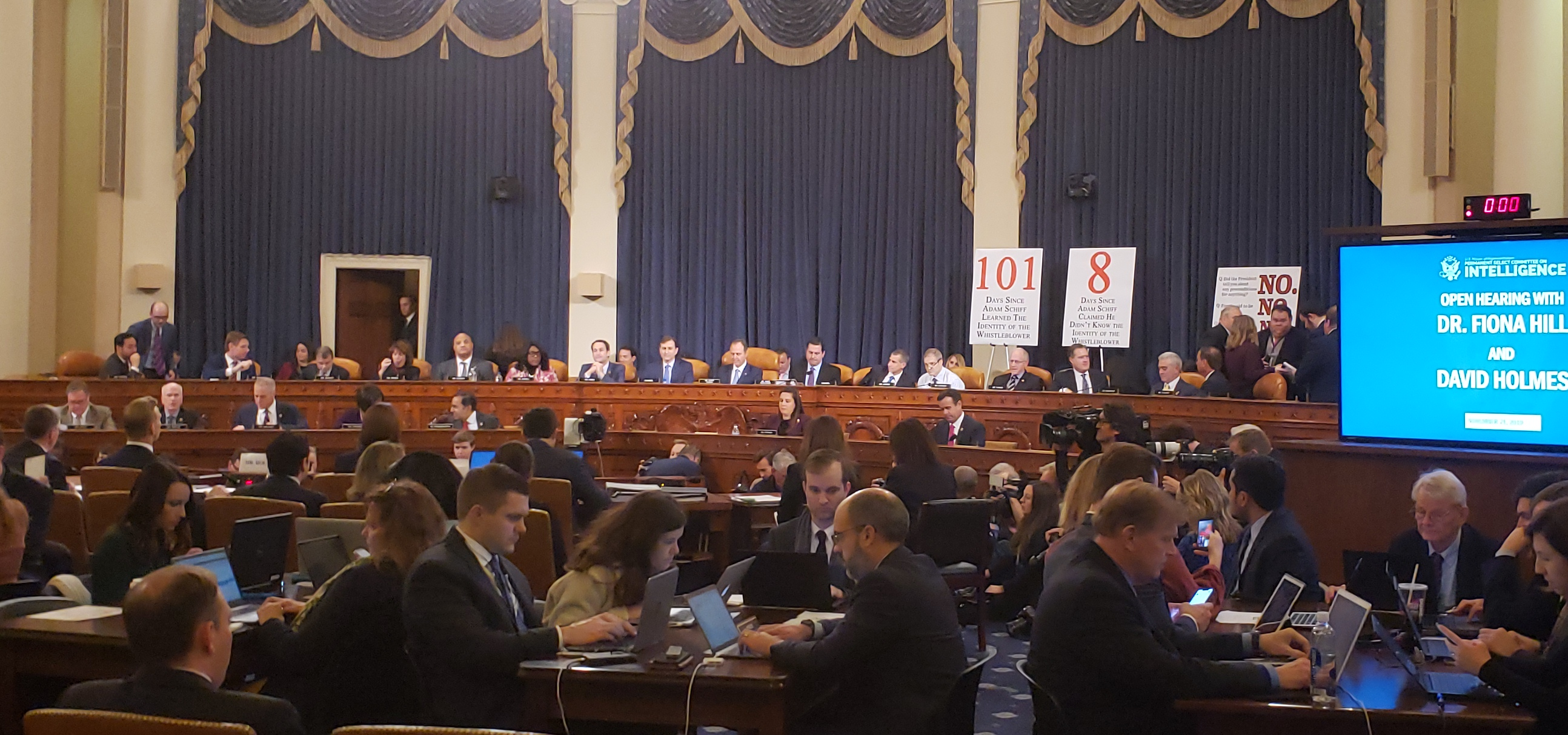
Open hearing testimony of Fiona Hill and David Holmes on November 21, 2019

A formal impeachment inquiry was announced on September 24. The White House released a non-verbatim transcript of the phone call between Trump and Zelensky the next day; while the congressional intelligence committees were allowed to read the whistleblower complaint. The White House declassified the complaint, which was released to the public. The transcript corroborated the main allegations of the complaint.

Congressional Democrats were generally in favor of impeachment, while Republicans defended the president. Ukraine envoy Kurt Volker resigned and three House committees issued a subpoena to Secretary of State Mike Pompeo to schedule depositions for Volker and four other State Department employees, and to compel the release of documents.

=== Use of the office ===
Trump often sought to use the office of the presidency for his own interest. The Justice Department is traditionally independent from the president, but was used to act in Trump's interest during his presidency.

He directed Postmaster General Louis DeJoy attempted to weaken the U.S. postal service by cutting funding and services, to prevent postal votes from being counted during the 2020 election campaign.

He fired, demoted, or withdrew nominations of numerous government officials for actions that harmed his image and personal or political interests, including FBI Director James Comey, Deputy FBI Director Andrew McCabe, U.S. Attorney General Jeff Sessions, and Director of National Intelligence Joseph Maguire.

According to several reports, his and his family's trips in the first month of his presidency cost U.S. taxpayers nearly as much as President Obama's travel expenses for an entire year, which was frequently criticized by Trump during his predecessor's term. The Washington Post reported that his lavish lifestyle is far more expensive to the taxpayers than that of previous presidents.

The Department of Defense Office of Inspector General issued an investigation report in January 2024 on prescription drug records and care between 2017 and 2019, which described improper recording of prescriptions, disposal of controlled substances, and verification of identities, among other problems. The pharmacy dispensed expensive brand name drugs for free, and considerable amounts of money was spent on healthcare for many ineligible White House staff members, employees, and contractors.

== Elections during the first Trump presidency ==
Congressional party leaders
| | | Senate leaders | | House leaders | |
| Congress | Year | Majority | Minority | Speaker | Minority |
|---|---|---|---|---|---|
| 115th | 2017–2018 | McConnell | Schumer | Ryan | Pelosi |
| 116th | 2019–2020 | McConnell | Schumer | Pelosi | McCarthy |
| 117th (Note: 17 days of the 115th Congress (January 3, 2017 – January 19, 2017) took place under President Obama, and 17 days of the 117th Congress (January 3, 2021 – January 19, 2021) took place during Trump's first presidency, with the Republicans also briefly have held a majority in the Senate until January 20, 2021.) | 2021 | McConnell (Note: The Congress began with 51 Republicans, 48 Democrats (including 2 independents who caucus with the Democrats) and 1 vacancy in the Senate. Georgia's class 2 seat was vacant from the start until Democrat Jon Ossoff was seated January 20, 2021. Georgia's class 3 Republican interim appointee Kelly Loeffler served until Democrat Raphael Warnock was also seated on January 20, 2021. The Republicans also briefly have held a majority in the Senate until January 20, 2021.) | Schumer | Pelosi | McCarthy |

Republican seats in Congress
| Congress | Senate | House |
|---|---|---|
| 115th | 52 | 241 |
| 116th | 53 | 200 |
| 117th | 51 | 211 (Note: The Congress began with 211 Republicans, 222 Democrats and 2 vacancies in the House. Louisiana's 5th district seat was vacant due to the death of Republican member elect Luke Letlow before the term started. New York's 22nd district seat was also vacant due to the disputed election until Republican Claudia Tenney would later be declared a winner and sworn in February 11, 2021.) |

=== 2018 midterm elections ===
In the 2018 mid-term elections, Democrats had a blue wave, winning control of the House, while Republicans expanded their majority in the Senate. After the election, Nancy Pelosi replaced Paul Ryan as Speaker of the House, while Kevin McCarthy became the House Minority Leader.

=== 2020 presidential election ===
Trump officially announced his reelection campaign for the Republican nomination in the 2020 presidential election on June 18, 2019. Trump did not face any significant rivals for the 2020 Republican nomination, with some state Republican parties cancelling the presidential primaries in the states. Trump's Democratic opponent in the general election was former vice president Joe Biden of Delaware. The election on November 3 was not called for either candidate for several days. On November 7, the Associated Press along with mainstream media called the race for Joe Biden.

It was the first presidency since that of Herbert Hoover in 1932 in which a sitting president was defeated and his party lost its majorities in both chambers of Congress.

==== Lost reelection and transition period ====
Democrat Joe Biden defeated Trump in the 2020 presidential election

Trump refused to concede, and the administration did not begin cooperating with president-elect Biden's transition team until November 23. In late December 2020, Biden and his transition team criticized Trump administration political appointees for hampering the transition and failing to cooperate with the Biden transition team on national security areas, such as the Defense and State departments, as well as on the economic response to the COVID-19 pandemic, saying that many of the agencies that are critical to their security have incurred enormous damage and have been hollowed out – in personnel, capacity and in morale.

Throughout December and January, Trump continued to insist that he had won the election. In December 2020, reports emerged that U.S. military leaders were on high alert, and ranking officers had discussed what to do if Trump declared martial law. CIA director Gina Haspel and Army general Mark Milley, chairman of the Joint Chiefs of Staff, grew concerned that Trump might attempt a coup or military action against China or Iran. Milley insisted that he be consulted about any military orders from Trump, including the use of nuclear weapons.

Trump filed numerous lawsuits alleging election fraud, tried to persuade state and federal officials to overturn the results, and urged his supporters to rally on his behalf. Although most resulting lawsuits were either dismissed or ruled against by numerous courts, Trump nonetheless conspired with his campaign team to submit documents in several states (all of which had been won by Biden) which falsely claimed to be legitimate electoral certificates for President Trump and Vice President Mike Pence. After the submission of these documents, the Trump campaign intended that the presiding officer of the United States Senate, either President of the Senate Pence or President pro tempore Chuck Grassley, would claim to have the unilateral power to reject electors during the January 6, 2021 vote counting session; the presiding officer would reject all electors from the several states in which the Trump campaign had submitted false documents, leaving 232 votes for Trump and 222 votes for Biden, thereby overturning the election results in favour of Trump. The plans for January 6 failed to come to fruition after Pence refused to follow the campaign's proposals.

==== Electoral vote count and U.S. Capitol attack ====
Trump's statement during the U.S. Capitol attack on January 6, 2021. The video was originally posted on Twitter and shared on other social media before being removed from all platforms for violating various policies

On January 6, 2021, rioters supporting Trump stormed the U.S. Capitol in an effort to thwart a joint session of Congress during which the Electoral College vote was to be certified, affirming the election of former vice president Joe Biden as president and Senator Kamala Harris as vice president.

During an initial rally earlier that morning, Trump encouraged his supporters to march to the U.S. Capitol. Subsequently, pro-Trump attendees marched to the Capitol building, joined other protesters, and stormed the building. Congress was in session at the time, conducting the Electoral College vote count and debating the results of the vote. As the protesters arrived, Capitol security evacuated the Senate and House of Representatives chambers and locked down several other buildings on the Capitol campus. Later that evening, after the Capitol was secured, Congress went back into session to discuss the Electoral College vote, finally affirming at 3:41 a.m. that Biden had won the election.

Five casualties occurred during the event: one Capitol Police officer, and four stormers or protesters at the Capitol, including one rioter shot by police inside the building. At least 138 police officers were injured. Three improvised explosive devices were reported to have been found: one each on Capitol grounds, at the Republican National Committee and Democratic National Committee offices.

==== Aftermath ====
Following the Capitol attack, several cabinet-level officials and White House staff resigned, citing the incident and Trump's behavior.

On January 7, the day after the Electoral College results were certified by Congress, Trump tweeted a video in which he stated, "A new administration will be inaugurated on January 20th. My focus now turns to ensuring a smooth, orderly and seamless transition of power." The State Department subsequently told diplomats to affirm Biden's victory.

On January 12, the House voted in favor of requesting that the vice president remove Trump from office per the Twenty-fifth Amendment; hours earlier, Pence had indicated that he opposed such a measure. The next day, the House voted 232–197 to impeach Trump on a charge of "incitement of insurrection". Ten Republican representatives joined all Democratic representatives in voting to impeach Trump. Trump is the first and only president to be impeached twice. On February 13, the Senate voted 57–43 to convict Trump on a charge of inciting insurrection, ten votes short of the required two-thirds majority, and he was acquitted. Seven Republican senators joined all Democratic and independent senators in voting to convict Trump.

President Trump's first farewell address on January 19, 2021

Trump gave a first farewell address the day prior to the inauguration of Joe Biden. In it he stressed his economic and foreign policy record, and said the country can never tolerate "political violence". Trump did not attend Biden's inauguration, becoming the first departing president in 152 years to refuse to attend his elected successor's inauguration, but he did honor another tradition by leaving Biden a letter on the Resolute desk in the White House.

== Historical evaluations and public opinion ==
=== Historical evaluations ===
Despite claims he won "in a landslide", Trump won the 2016 election with 56.9% of the electoral college—placing the win in approximately the 23rd percentile of all presidential elections.

Trump claimed he won the 2016 electoral vote in a "landslide", but he ranks below most presidents in both the electoral vote (then 46th out of 58 elections; accompanying chart) and popular vote (near the bottom of all elections; shown in chart).

The V-Dem Institute said regarding Trump's presidency that "the speed with which American democracy is currently dismantled is unprecedented in modern history". First-term declines in the Institute's indices of democracy were substantial, to be exceeded only during his second term.

In the 2018 presidential rankings by the Siena College Research Institute, Trump ranked as the third-worst president in history. C-SPAN's 2021 President Historians Survey ranked Trump as the fourth-worst president overall and the worst in the leadership characteristics of Moral Authority and Administrative Skills. Trump's best rated leadership characteristic was Public Persuasion, where he ranked 32nd out of the 44 presidents. Trump ranked last in both the 2018 and 2024 surveys of the American Political Science Association Presidents and Executive Politics section, with self-identified Republican historians ranking Trump in their bottom five presidents.

=== Opinion polling ===
Gallup approval polling, Jan. 2017 – Jan. 2021
Disapprove
Unsure
Approve

In a larger context, Trump's approval rating (Gallup polling) after the first year of his first term was the lowest to date of any president since 1977, exceeded only by the rating of his second term's first year.

At the time of the 2016 election, polls by Gallup found Trump had a favorable rating around 35 percent and an unfavorable rating around 60 percent, while Clinton held a favorable rating of 40 percent and an unfavorable rating of 57 percent. 2016 was the first election cycle in modern presidential polling in which both major-party candidates were viewed so unfavorably. By January 20, 2017, Inauguration Day, Trump's approval rating average was 42 percent, the lowest rating average for an incoming president in the history of modern polling; during his term it was an "incredibly stable (and also historically low)" 36 percent to 40 percent. According to Gallup, Trump's approval rating peaked at 49 percent in several polls in early 2020; this makes him the only president to never reach a 50 percent approval rating in the Gallup poll dating to 1938.

=== Democratic backsliding ===
Since the beginning of Trump's presidency, ratings of how well U.S. democracy is functioning has dropped significantly according to the 2018 Varieties of Democracy Annual Democracy Report, which cites "a significant democratic backsliding in the United States [since the Inauguration of Donald Trump] ... attributable to weakening constraints on the executive." Freedom House also attributed a 2019 decrease in its U.S. rankings to Trump, as did Transparency International in downgrading the United States in its Corruption Perceptions Index. International IDEA labeled the U.S. a "backsliding democracy" after evaluating 2020 and 2021 events, noting Trump's election denial as a historic turning point and the Jan. 6 attack on the U.S. Capitol as raising alarm bells.

== See also ==
- First 100 days of the first Trump presidency
- Bibliography of Donald Trump
- Efforts to impeach Donald Trump
- Government attacks on journalists in the United States during Donald Trump's first presidency
- List of United States presidential vetoes § Donald Trump
- Make America Great Again
- Political positions of Donald Trump
- List of federal political scandals in the United States (21st century)
- Timeline of investigations into Trump and Russia
- Timeline of Russian interference in the 2016 United States elections
- Timeline of Russian interference in the 2016 United States elections (July 2016–election day)
- January 6 United States Capitol attack
