= Tricia Newbold =

American government employee

Tricia Newbold (née Picard) is an American career government employee who has worked in the Executive Office of the President of the United States since 2000. She works as a manager in the White House's Personnel Security Office.

== Personal life ==
Formerly known as Tricia Picard, Newbold is from Madawaska, Maine, where she grew up and graduated from Madawaska High School in 1998. She was born with a rare form of dwarfism.

== Career ==
Newbold has worked in the White House during four presidential administrations, beginning with the Clinton administration in 2000. She eventually took on the role of adjudications manager in the White House, in which capacity she has had to determine whether certain presidential employees should be granted security clearances. In addition to the Clinton and Trump administrations, she also worked under Presidents George W. Bush and Barack Obama.

== Security clearance controversy ==
In January 2019, Newbold was suspended for fourteen days without pay for refusing to cooperate with procedures implemented by her supervisor. She has alleged that this suspension was made in retaliation for attempting to express her concerns about the granting of security clearances by her office. In March 2019, Newbold spoke privately to the House Oversight Committee, claiming that at least 25 Trump administration officials were granted security clearances over the objections of career staffers. Newbold also asserted that some of these officials had previously had their applications rejected for "disqualifying issues", only for those rejections to be overturned with inadequate explanation. On April 1, 2019, Elijah Cummings, the Committee chair, released a letter detailing Newbold's accusations. In a subsequent interview with NBC News, she accused her former boss, Carl Kline, of embarrassing her by moving files to high locations where she could not reach them. Two sources confirmed the allegation to NBC. She had previously filed a complaint against Kline with the Equal Employment Opportunity Commission for this alleged behavior.

According to The Atlantic, Newbold "set an important mark when she became the first official currently serving in Donald Trump's White House to take accusations of wrongdoing to Congress—and to put her name publicly behind them."
