= Carl Kline (White House official) =

Former U.S. White House official

Carl Kline is a former U.S. White House official who was the director of the personnel security office in the Executive Office of U.S. President Donald Trump from May 2017 to January 2019. Prior to working for the White House, Kline was the Chief of Personnel Security for Security Policy and Oversight Directorate at the Department of Defense, and he returned to the Department after leaving the Executive Office.

Multiple sources stated in January 2019 that in at least 30 cases where professional security experts expressed concerns about granting top-secret clearance to specific Trump officials including Jared Kushner, Kline had overruled their concerns. In Kushner's case, a February 2019 New York Times article stated that Kline was carrying out Trump's instructions, but a May 2019 New York Times story clarified that Kline overruled instructions that were given to him and made decisions on his own accord. White House security experts had been overruled only once during the three years preceding the Trump administration.

Also in January 2019, one of Kline's staff members, Tricia Newbold, said Kline retaliated against her for raising concerns about security clearance practices and for discriminating against her on the basis of her height.

The House Oversight Committee subpoenaed Kline, who was at that time working for the Defense Department, to appear before the Committee for an interview on April 23. However White House deputy counsel Michael Purpura instructed Kline not to appear at the deposition, citing constitutional concerns. Kline eventually had a private meeting with the committee on May 1. He reportedly told the committee that he made all the decisions about security clearances himself and that no one in the White House instructed him or tried to influence him.

== See also ==
- Jared Kushner's security clearance
- Timeline of investigations into Trump and Russia (2019)
