= List of countries by past and projected GDP (PPP) =

This is an alphabetical list of countries by past and projected gross domestic product, based on the purchasing power parity (PPP) methodology, not on market exchange rates. These figures have been taken from the International Monetary Fund's World Economic Outlook (WEO) Database, October 2026 Edition. The figures are given or expressed in Millions of International Dollars at current prices.

== IMF estimates ==
=== 1980s ===
IMF estimates (1980s)
Country / territory	1980	1981	1982	1983	1984	1985	1986	1987	1988	1989
Afghanistan										
Albania	5,810	6,722	7,344	7,716	8,154	8,286	8,926	9,074	9,263	10,569
Algeria	77,817	87,735	99,118	108,562	118,779	129,397	131,738	134,057	136,148	148,278
Andorra										
Angola	12,679	13,268	14,088	15,255	16,753	17,888	18,778	20,028	22,006	22,878
Antigua and Barbuda	234	266	283	310	353	392	446	488	531	581
Argentina	200,626	206,994	212,865	229,459	242,496	232,774	254,429	267,327	271,340	262,222
Armenia										
Aruba							659	783	962	1,121
Australia	152,449	173,760	184,613	190,933	210,379	228,873	239,197	257,118	277,507	301,743
Austria	91,960	100,560	108,811	116,243	120,838	127,456	133,065	138,654	144,923	156,460
Azerbaijan										
Bahamas	2,705	2,875	3,245	3,602	3,821	4,104	4,295	4,565	4,832	5,137
Bahrain	6,551	7,370	8,327	9,259	9,994	10,214	10,470	10,599	11,626	12,204
Bangladesh	51,603	58,633	63,736	68,892	75,076	79,947	85,021	90,380	95,588	101,931
Barbados	1,589	1,706	1,723	1,799	1,932	2,015	2,160	2,271	2,433	2,620
Belarus										
Belgium	114,990	125,518	134,067	139,752	148,367	155,587	161,613	169,438	183,698	197,524
Belize	233	256	251	277	319	325	355	444	510	612
Benin	3,772	4,208	4,543	4,627	4,813	5,180	5,430	5,449	5,834	5,890
Bhutan	242	301	345	385	429	462	509	627	747	825
Bolivia	15,050	16,524	16,854	16,806	17,377	17,626	17,519	18,395	19,598	21,138
Bosnia and Herzegovina										
Botswana	1,935	2,290	2,818	3,244	3,581	3,978	4,408	5,190	6,631	7,212
Brazil	524,990	549,376	586,799	589,044	642,696	715,402	784,865	833,276	864,942	927,623
Brunei						9,621	9,549	9,982	10,447	10,740
Bulgaria	44,707	51,530	57,012	61,022	66,133	69,452	74,606	80,048	84,860	87,746
Burkina Faso	2,717	3,053	3,287	3,375	3,552	4,079	4,492	4,592	5,030	5,340
Burundi	1,535	1,884	1,980	2,134	2,214	2,553	2,689	2,908	3,162	3,330
Cape Verde	237	281	307	349	375	421	442	472	518	569
Cambodia								4,839	5,492	5,897
Cameroon	11,150	14,286	16,316	18,115	20,171	22,496	24,507	24,574	23,439	23,928
Canada	290,290	328,886	338,153	360,398	395,431	427,262	445,111	474,716	513,134	545,720
Central African Republic	1,657	2,049	2,098	2,049	2,333	2,497	2,730	2,798	2,946	3,178
Chad	2,267	2,213	2,476	2,976	3,246	3,613	3,905	4,148	4,619	4,893
Chile	38,880	45,202	41,474	41,890	45,956	48,343	52,076	56,878	63,176	72,616
China	272,666	313,686	363,046	418,006	498,923	584,191	648,993	742,889	855,225	926,090
Colombia	77,444	86,702	92,932	98,091	105,037	111,725	120,613	130,238	140,311	150,791
Comoros	381	440	486	520	562	595	620	649	705	726
Democratic Republic of the Congo	23,392	25,847	27,320	28,790	31,274	32,413	34,626	36,432	37,892	38,882
Republic of the Congo	2,770	3,111	3,383	3,600	3,818	4,032	4,210	4,414	5,571	7,021
Costa Rica	9,627	10,299	10,139	10,837	12,130	12,604	13,569	14,568	15,599	17,130
Ivory Coast	20,310	23,009	24,480	24,802	25,184	26,915	28,775	29,341	30,722	32,868
Croatia										
Cyprus	3,092	3,487	3,935	4,307	4,856	5,248	5,545	6,088	6,827	7,669
Czech Republic										
Denmark	63,654	69,160	76,291	81,379	87,976	94,526	100,996	103,980	107,938	112,951
Djibouti										
Dominica	132	160	177	189	204	213	233	254	283	294
Dominican Republic	14,099	16,094	17,379	18,895	19,822	20,015	21,137	23,852	25,226	27,369
Ecuador	24,818	28,225	30,329	30,634	33,073	35,620	37,461	36,097	41,288	43,029
Egypt	88,009	98,453	112,165	126,903	142,029	157,400	168,211	179,745	193,515	207,122
El Salvador	11,174	11,531	11,471	12,104	12,708	13,191	13,482	14,163	14,938	15,673
Equatorial Guinea	86	99	107	117	123	143	142	152	162	166
Eritrea										
Estonia										
Eswatini	878	1,028	1,107	1,144	1,215	1,277	1,545	1,742	1,940	2,206
Ethiopia	11,919	13,047	13,987	15,675	15,866	14,500	16,225	18,934	19,714	20,393
Fiji	1,883	2,185	2,295	2,284	2,606	2,587	2,813	2,675	2,865	3,391
Finland	47,692	52,879	57,880	62,025	66,328	70,846	74,242	78,790	85,819	93,721
France	592,714	656,489	713,811	751,128	791,259	829,911	866,307	910,566	986,702	1,072,406
Gabon	5,946	6,248	6,906	7,320	7,956	8,684	8,672	7,519	8,056	9,664
Gambia	651	645	826	975	933	998	1,042	1,098	1,156	1,253
Georgia										
Germany	922,257	1,010,627	1,064,620	1,123,508	1,196,957	1,261,876	1,318,401	1,370,923	1,472,289	1,589,893
Ghana	11,450	12,063	11,745	11,445	12,970	14,241	15,427	16,862	18,586	20,192
Greece	90,465	97,484	102,338	105,198	111,182	117,581	120,566	120,765	130,385	140,645
Grenada	205	228	252	270	291	318	349	390	415	448
Guatemala	22,281	24,546	25,140	25,464	26,518	27,192	27,767	29,474	31,701	34,243
Guinea	4,583	5,047	5,456	5,743	6,034	6,536	6,875	7,278	8,010	8,657
Guinea-Bissau	553	602	666	669	731	787	794	860	907	971
Guyana	1,996	2,197	2,126	1,955	2,069	2,142	2,180	2,231	2,172	2,145
Haiti	10,200	11,283	11,645	11,920	12,375	12,863	13,158	13,426	13,977	14,360
Honduras	6,047	6,538	6,798	7,128	7,853	8,557	9,195	10,048	10,584	11,299
Hong Kong	33,435	39,963	43,657	48,095	54,816	56,953	64,551	75,012	84,267	89,566
Hungary	67,542	76,051	83,045	86,921	92,452	95,134	98,539	105,072	108,706	113,801
Iceland	2,842	3,244	3,519	3,578	3,860	4,113	4,459	4,960	5,130	5,345
India	361,155	419,070	460,430	513,337	552,184	599,575	640,864	682,786	774,921	853,202
Indonesia	163,519	192,601	209,096	226,395	252,333	270,479	295,759	323,008	357,737	405,538
Iran	172,035	177,584	232,249	268,101	257,944	271,071	249,470	255,213	248,143	273,687
Iraq										
Ireland	27,945	31,357	33,792	34,860	37,275	39,203	40,161	42,655	45,483	49,921
Israel	29,675	34,016	36,633	39,052	41,356	44,562	47,073	51,853	55,595	58,595
Italy	623,346	714,580	761,875	800,965	856,644	908,460	953,256	1,008,060	1,087,383	1,168,316
Jamaica	6,723	7,685	8,411	9,103	9,521	9,734	10,625	11,727	11,655	12,682
Japan	1,046,261	1,194,044	1,309,411	1,410,081	1,525,416	1,654,850	1,743,777	1,870,064	2,064,983	2,251,665
Jordan	9,497	11,952	13,432	14,149	15,462	15,778	17,051	17,947	19,117	17,748
Kazakhstan										
Kenya	21,678	24,702	27,553	29,088	30,620	32,875	35,879	38,904	42,730	46,427
Kiribati	55	63	67	62	74	66	66	68	86	83
South Korea	83,857	98,587	113,543	133,879	153,465	170,886	194,380	224,877	261,055	290,730
Kosovo										
Kuwait		27,307	26,239	28,698	31,292	30,907	34,230	37,935	35,326	46,218
Kyrgyzstan										
Laos	1,916	2,418	2,689	2,878	3,174	3,573	3,821	3,878	3,930	4,488
Latvia										
Lebanon	22,155	24,384	16,366	20,869	31,240	40,059	38,097	45,573	33,871	20,347
Lesotho	599	676	757	811	880	935	990	1,041	1,163	1,281
Liberia										
Libya	71,569	62,640	67,521	66,860	63,520	65,926	59,619	52,114	58,040	64,659
Liechtenstein										
Lithuania										
Luxembourg	6,342	6,998	7,507	7,949	8,625	9,396	10,542	11,230	12,610	14,388
Macau										
Madagascar	8,225	8,121	8,459	8,870	9,351	9,759	10,150	10,524	11,266	12,185
Malawi	2,704	2,805	3,053	3,290	3,592	3,875	3,944	4,108	4,388	4,621
Malaysia	42,296	49,511	55,694	61,492	68,657	70,208	72,447	78,242	89,051	100,928
Maldives	320	378	432	469	570	669	741	827	931	1,057
Mali	5,879	6,580	6,399	6,496	6,541	7,639	7,733	7,863	9,020	9,711
Malta	1,920	2,158	2,294	2,446	2,554	2,698	2,857	3,095	3,422	3,809
Marshall Islands										
Mauritania										
Mauritius	1,917	2,222	2,489	2,597	2,819	3,108	3,479	3,928	4,343	4,714
Mexico	441,519	529,620	562,068	557,070	597,454	628,176	615,639	643,913	674,742	726,623
Federated States of Micronesia										
Moldova										
Mongolia	2,575	3,055	3,514	3,863	4,239	4,622	5,159	5,474	5,959	6,452
Montenegro										
Morocco	28,679	30,524	35,528	36,713	39,688	43,532	48,095	48,033	54,905	58,408
Mozambique	2,294	2,636	2,606	2,283	2,211	2,304	2,296	2,699	3,024	3,346
Myanmar										
Namibia										
Nauru										
Nepal	7,680	9,108	10,036	10,118	11,498	12,591	13,431	13,998	15,607	16,921
Netherlands	171,338	186,585	195,573	206,805	220,950	233,991	246,164	256,931	278,188	302,050
New Zealand	30,344	34,199	37,357	38,772	42,926	44,820	46,550	48,866	50,870	53,097
Nicaragua	6,586	7,596	8,000	8,696	8,869	8,776	8,862	9,017	8,178	8,354
Niger	3,676	4,017	4,358	4,353	3,752	4,169	4,523	4,640	5,133	5,386
Nigeria										
North Macedonia										
Norway	54,648	60,819	64,734	69,920	76,845	83,684	88,824	92,613	95,562	100,332
Oman	9,092	11,654	13,797	16,624	19,619	23,178	24,152	23,762	25,891	27,709
Pakistan	74,903	87,079	99,452	110,362	118,888	133,328	144,666	156,866	172,850	188,265
Palau										
Panama	8,806	10,526	11,775	11,686	12,436	13,463	14,224	14,313	12,835	13,547
Papua New Guinea	3,179	3,520	3,768	4,051	4,156	4,440	4,786	5,040	5,369	5,500
Paraguay	10,645	12,720	13,317	13,418	14,294	15,317	15,666	16,708	18,315	20,140
Peru	52,431	60,525	64,057	60,355	64,911	68,362	78,181	86,318	80,943	72,827
Philippines	85,411	96,693	106,384	112,622	108,141	103,409	109,096	116,620	128,885	142,250
Poland	172,996	170,428	172,189	188,952	195,055	208,994	220,652	231,324	247,350	266,848
Portugal	63,517	71,975	78,076	81,922	83,994	88,068	92,824	102,384	111,655	123,748
Puerto Rico	20,154	22,297	22,953	23,963	26,645	28,054	30,955	33,282	36,698	40,021
Qatar	13,722	14,436	14,069	13,841	16,634	14,924	15,788	16,325	17,695	19,364
Romania	118,891	130,269	143,714	158,302	173,856	179,175	187,169	193,341	199,159	194,965
Russia										
Rwanda	2,120	2,378	2,463	2,714	3,176	3,421	3,682	3,762	3,906	3,827
Samoa	195	194	204	213	225	245	262	270	288	316
San Marino										
São Tomé and Príncipe	137	135	148	147	144	162	155	155	163	175
Saudi Arabia	319,006	359,604	320,316	296,267	294,658	282,054	290,633	288,504	318,392	332,251
Senegal	5,779	6,647	7,611	7,488	8,049	8,576	9,021	9,808	10,093	10,906
Serbia										
Seychelles	268	282	293	302	327	372	382	411	448	513
Sierra Leone	4,804	5,357	5,790	5,922	6,240	6,003	6,132	6,434	6,798	7,414
Singapore	21,412	25,973	29,537	33,319	37,557	38,503	39,806	45,197	52,062	59,599
Slovakia										
Slovenia										
Solomon Islands	219	236	246	266	276	275	280	312	327	354
Somalia										
South Africa	140,741	162,316	171,685	175,114	190,686	194,332	198,280	207,462	223,799	238,145
South Sudan										
Spain	313,983	342,287	367,940	388,666	409,532	432,461	456,308	494,312	538,787	587,933
Sri Lanka	16,908	19,497	21,786	23,389	25,863	28,003	29,790	30,972	32,929	34,991
Saint Kitts and Nevis	121	136	154	157	178	195	217	241	275	303
Saint Lucia	302	347	377	407	456	529	618	658	776	879
Saint Vincent and the Grenadines	182	208	231	245	271	296	319	329	388	409
Sudan	20,603	23,977	26,510	27,132	26,529	27,197	30,501	33,276	35,929	37,869
Suriname	2,545	2,839	2,825	2,786	2,800	2,862	2,850	2,663	3,055	3,248
Sweden	89,267	102,150	109,978	116,519	125,956	132,933	139,814	148,205	157,335	167,695
Switzerland	121,973	135,731	142,200	148,703	158,672	169,840	176,442	183,662	196,199	212,916
Syria	18,923	22,466	24,470	25,836	25,029	27,705	26,918	27,931	32,594	31,817
Taiwan	57,425	68,812	76,579	86,759	98,924	106,960	121,675	140,590	157,227	177,644
Tajikistan										
Tanzania	9,107	10,018	10,701	11,387	12,199	13,164	14,315	15,535	16,791	18,112
Thailand	75,722	87,784	98,198	107,739	118,057	127,445	137,205	153,990	180,604	210,572
Timor-Leste										
Togo	2,635	2,786	2,848	2,807	3,079	3,295	3,471	3,469	3,954	4,278
Tonga	67	83	100	110	164	178	198	206	206	216
Trinidad and Tobago	6,505	7,447	8,207	7,650	7,471	7,389	7,291	7,131	7,093	7,310
Tunisia	13,337	15,405	16,279	17,707	19,397	21,145	21,257	23,244	24,080	25,670
Turkey	161,138	184,082	202,160	220,071	243,571	261,973	285,798	322,248	340,688	354,944
Turkmenistan										
Tuvalu										
Uganda	4,686	5,327	6,120	6,672	6,705	6,710	6,909	7,364	8,256	9,129
Ukraine										
United Arab Emirates	64,139	75,841	74,739	73,588	79,638	80,084	65,955	71,174	71,751	86,296
United Kingdom	524,131	570,520	617,824	668,888	708,572	760,911	800,381	865,003	944,096	1,004,852
United States	2,857,325	3,207,025	3,343,800	3,634,025	4,037,650	4,339,000	4,579,625	4,855,250	5,236,425	5,641,600
Uruguay	14,130	15,761	15,163	14,835	15,146	15,672	17,186	18,653	19,407	20,391
Uzbekistan										
Vanuatu	120	137	149	159	181	188	192	191	194	205
Venezuela	118,319	127,845	139,335	130,521	142,295	148,068	160,232	172,087	189,754	169,746
Vietnam	31,438	36,407	41,807	46,526	52,253	56,935	60,031	63,086	68,642	76,898
Palestine										
Yemen										
Zambia	6,927	8,085	8,334	8,562	8,718	9,105	9,446	9,825	11,114	11,127
Zimbabwe										

=== 1990s ===
IMF estimates between (1990s)
Country / territory	1990	1991	1992	1993	1994	1995	1996	1997	1998	1999
Afghanistan										
Albania	9,868	7,346	6,972	7,822	8,741	9,718	10,796	9,783	10,766	12,326
Algeria	155,058	158,379	164,581	164,939	166,945	177,003	187,093	192,413	204,499	214,029
Andorra										
Angola	22,915	26,553	30,255	34,369	38,793	43,711	49,500	54,016	57,186	59,260
Antigua and Barbuda	621	656	678	731	797	778	845	906	960	1,009
Argentina	268,397	306,605	345,890	376,221	406,656	403,369	433,455	476,692	500,611	490,507
Armenia			6,182	5,439	5,855	6,468	6,973	7,324	7,945	8,330
Aruba	1,209	1,350	1,461	1,605	1,774	1,857	1,915	2,084	2,150	2,210
Australia	317,687	325,194	341,260	363,036	388,866	408,768	432,773	461,022	488,059	516,844
Austria	169,369	181,124	189,130	194,633	203,564	213,377	222,495	231,188	241,952	254,607
Azerbaijan			27,537	21,678	17,785	15,793	16,489	18,263	19,578	22,118
Bahamas	5,385	5,335	5,248	5,388	5,677	6,050	6,421	6,854	7,258	7,887
Bahrain	13,104	13,857	15,182	16,724	17,630	18,346	19,289	20,082	21,292	22,883
Bangladesh	112,028	119,685	128,582	137,650	146,332	156,758	167,006	177,513	188,802	200,415
Barbados	2,628	2,611	2,518	2,599	2,707	2,820	2,985	3,181	3,337	3,395
Belarus			51,009	48,250	43,514	39,502	41,342	46,863	51,390	53,865
Belgium	211,346	222,499	231,053	234,254	246,977	258,168	266,369	281,241	289,982	304,504
Belize	706	816	941	1,022	1,044	1,074	1,105	1,172	1,231	1,366
Benin	6,659	7,175	7,556	8,187	8,530	9,236	9,811	10,553	11,094	11,742
Bhutan	933	1,012	1,057	1,117	1,166	1,262	1,362	1,462	1,567	1,702
Bolivia	22,946	24,941	25,989	27,756	29,677	31,710	33,773	36,075	38,571	39,332
Bosnia and Herzegovina							11,455	14,316	16,476	18,505
Botswana	8,140	8,940	9,125	9,717	9,847	10,903	11,376	12,395	12,331	13,510
Brazil	922,224	963,251	980,605	1,050,674	1,130,355	1,205,024	1,254,191	1,319,129	1,338,467	1,363,758
Brunei	11,264	12,011	12,869	13,214	13,921	14,849	15,556	15,592	15,679	16,386
Bulgaria	82,747	76,345	71,505	64,690	63,650	63,944	68,504	59,849	62,815	58,355
Burkina Faso	5,506	6,209	6,365	6,741	6,976	7,529	8,511	9,205	9,989	10,873
Burundi	3,574	3,909	4,038	3,876	3,807	3,579	3,353	3,425	3,628	3,722
Cape Verde	594	623	657	721	788	865	940	1,029	1,128	1,279
Cambodia	6,186	6,881	7,535	8,025	8,867	9,950	10,730	11,352	12,017	13,735
Cameroon	23,294	23,175	22,980	22,782	22,688	23,929	25,564	27,387	29,050	30,658
Canada	567,292	574,217	592,533	622,697	664,576	696,709	721,447	765,299	804,028	857,326
Central African Republic	3,342	3,427	3,333	3,371	3,876	4,082	3,901	4,131	4,317	4,505
Chad	5,239	5,980	6,262	6,278	6,764	6,852	7,125	7,658	8,282	8,342
Chile	78,099	87,042	98,967	107,987	115,841	128,835	137,734	150,466	158,518	160,321
China	998,104	1,137,147	1,329,114	1,550,224	1,790,780	2,029,733	2,272,927	2,527,583	2,758,784	3,014,854
Colombia	163,132	172,651	184,272	199,411	214,153	230,018	239,044	251,508	255,784	248,498
Comoros	808	784	861	904	886	956	968	1,028	1,040	1,083
Democratic Republic of the Congo	37,687	35,672	32,668	28,938	27,740	29,104	29,063	27,247	26,485	25,839
Republic of the Congo	7,357	7,864	8,380	8,691	8,753	9,290	9,791	9,860	10,863	10,612
Costa Rica	18,410	19,464	21,739	23,834	25,443	27,055	27,923	29,960	32,444	34,268
Ivory Coast	33,727	34,881	35,587	36,365	37,205	40,101	44,158	47,490	50,392	51,931
Croatia			41,902	39,463	42,684	46,470	50,100	54,351	55,985	56,246
Cyprus	8,544	8,899	9,954	10,261	11,098	12,456	12,859	13,426	14,407	15,341
Czech Republic						161,217	171,597	173,516	174,776	179,693
Denmark	119,129	124,953	130,387	133,370	143,427	150,884	158,102	165,921	171,685	179,287
Djibouti		1,579	1,624	1,550	1,562	1,539	1,509	1,516	1,535	1,602
Dominica	322	337	352	368	376	395	415	431	453	461
Dominican Republic	26,844	28,015	31,873	35,032	36,708	39,614	42,744	47,351	51,094	54,903
Ecuador	45,982	49,968	52,954	55,294	58,879	61,468	63,677	67,578	70,570	68,177
Egypt	219,922	232,135	238,138	250,852	266,937	284,753	304,114	327,669	356,345	383,468
El Salvador	17,045	17,886	19,578	21,208	22,677	24,248	24,893	26,117	27,111	28,089
Equatorial Guinea	177	181	246	278	331	428	665	1,678	2,118	2,715
Eritrea			1,723	1,991	2,459	2,569	2,855	3,134	3,231	3,283
Estonia				11,785	11,839	12,348	13,196	15,175	16,012	16,169
Eswatini	2,514	2,644	2,792	2,947	3,082	3,299	3,488	3,658	3,796	3,963
Ethiopia	21,707	20,821	19,399	22,512	23,795	25,781	29,805	31,181	30,211	32,567
Fiji	3,722	3,744	4,063	4,267	4,581	4,799	5,121	5,084	5,208	5,741
Finland	97,434	94,807	93,756	95,229	101,117	107,607	113,589	122,940	131,103	138,794
France	1,143,608	1,197,564	1,242,105	1,266,134	1,324,243	1,385,228	1,429,586	1,490,814	1,559,824	1,633,477
Gabon	10,542	11,566	11,464	12,199	12,922	13,849	14,614	15,719	16,449	15,189
Gambia	1,374	1,451	1,510	1,605	1,584	1,671	1,751	1,806	1,945	2,099
Georgia					9,466	9,916	11,157	12,522	13,045	13,613
Germany	1,743,795	1,893,122	1,975,337	2,002,256	2,098,176	2,174,571	2,237,320	2,318,118	2,393,459	2,478,924
Ghana	21,701	23,506	25,117	26,939	28,480	30,307	32,333	34,797	36,951	39,171
Greece	145,909	155,523	160,177	161,351	168,092	175,219	180,894	190,643	199,412	207,611
Grenada	484	508	515	517	538	561	596	636	719	781
Guatemala	36,626	39,001	41,725	44,166	46,688	49,764	52,094	55,165	58,351	61,366
Guinea	9,370	9,928	10,487	11,277	11,979	12,802	13,646	14,640	15,364	16,199
Guinea-Bissau	1,053	1,168	1,232	1,290	1,356	1,440	1,521	1,640	1,287	1,524
Guyana	2,159	2,366	2,608	2,889	3,201	3,433	3,774	4,076	4,052	4,232
Haiti	14,832	15,528	15,524	15,110	13,642	15,306	16,231	16,958	17,523	18,252
Honduras	12,049	12,043	13,066	14,244	14,579	15,806	16,397	17,446	18,276	18,398
Hong Kong	96,477	105,427	114,553	124,540	134,877	140,973	149,668	160,013	152,293	158,319
Hungary	113,932	103,778	102,891	104,723	110,111	115,277	117,506	123,092	129,265	135,140
Iceland	5,610	5,787	5,719	5,932	6,277	6,416	6,827	7,233	7,827	8,247
India	934,112	975,912	1,052,878	1,129,036	1,229,934	1,350,830	1,479,413	1,565,872	1,681,398	1,856,027
Indonesia	458,588	516,429	562,651	621,811	682,975	754,611	828,503	882,400	775,186	792,374
Iran	322,530	375,840	397,082	400,514	402,120	420,407	455,291	469,397	484,546	501,244
Iraq										
Ireland	55,782	58,615	62,097	65,040	70,344	78,708	87,437	98,503	108,342	121,446
Israel	64,820	70,107	76,835	81,622	89,210	99,873	107,748	113,599	119,495	125,152
Italy	1,236,916	1,297,103	1,337,731	1,357,757	1,416,582	1,488,032	1,538,379	1,595,042	1,642,075	1,693,252
Jamaica	13,798	14,384	15,120	15,820	16,461	17,230	17,587	17,597	17,579	18,003
Japan	2,449,012	2,621,053	2,704,930	2,756,322	2,841,096	2,968,593	3,115,914	3,212,845	3,191,366	3,225,274
Jordan	18,117	17,672	21,121	22,564	24,199	26,177	27,166	28,668	29,920	31,325
Kazakhstan			116,413	108,208	96,616	90,553	92,672	95,872	95,108	99,058
Kenya	50,156	52,547	53,164	54,372	56,939	60,625	64,500	65,882	68,610	71,111
Kiribati	80	79	100	102	106	111	113	117	123	120
South Korea	331,846	380,380	413,759	453,193	506,250	567,184	623,719	674,333	648,233	733,779
Kosovo										
Kuwait	35,371	21,572	40,334	55,796	61,898	64,250	65,818	68,622	71,929	71,642
Kyrgyzstan			10,982	9,780	8,010	7,735	8,434	9,430	9,739	10,237
Laos	4,968	5,341	5,845	6,335	6,998	7,648	8,325	9,053	9,547	10,072
Latvia			15,749	14,284	14,910	14,905	15,527	17,244	18,580	19,374
Lebanon	18,275	26,111	27,906	30,567	33,727	36,670	38,849	43,546	45,753	46,029
Lesotho	1,414	1,572	1,706	1,816	1,951	2,073	2,211	2,323	2,380	2,449
Liberia										
Libya	69,574	85,104	83,087	80,405	84,766	73,189	75,840	75,115	75,446	76,368
Liechtenstein										
Lithuania						25,491	27,318	30,113	32,786	32,889
Luxembourg	15,721	17,657	18,388	19,615	20,799	21,540	22,266	23,995	25,840	28,413
Macau										
Madagascar	13,037	12,628	13,068	13,659	13,945	14,476	15,058	15,884	16,692	17,723
Malawi	5,067	5,695	5,398	6,062	5,553	6,453	7,227	7,836	8,008	8,409
Malaysia	114,136	129,262	143,956	161,951	180,646	202,562	226,902	247,727	232,077	249,791
Maldives	1,052	1,163	1,266	1,366	1,500	1,645	1,827	2,052	2,278	2,477
Mali	9,542	11,113	10,791	11,527	12,432	12,785	13,848	14,667	15,819	16,798
Malta	4,135	4,527	5,005	5,325	5,689	6,207	6,574	7,011	7,331	7,716
Marshall Islands								104	104	104
Mauritania	5,759	5,954	6,198	6,717	6,651	7,457	8,035	7,843	8,152	8,571
Mauritius	5,242	5,660	6,166	6,633	7,055	7,512	8,077	8,683	9,314	9,692
Mexico	793,392	852,839	903,403	951,329	1,014,339	974,397	1,053,937	1,149,291	1,234,092	1,286,036
Federated States of Micronesia						218	215	205	213	219
Moldova			15,242	15,416	10,880	10,950	10,492	10,844	10,253	10,045
Mongolia	6,527	6,127	5,686	5,637	5,880	6,386	6,648	7,026	7,343	7,675
Montenegro										
Morocco	63,039	70,090	69,603	70,538	80,325	76,819	88,754	88,468	96,601	98,487
Mozambique	3,506	3,862	3,651	4,147	4,508	4,700	5,298	6,026	6,726	7,627
Myanmar									32,357	35,582
Namibia	5,375	5,854	6,542	6,588	6,931	7,368	7,742	8,208	8,573	8,987
Nauru										
Nepal	18,367	20,198	21,507	22,863	25,271	26,695	28,635	30,661	31,918	33,821
Netherlands	326,446	345,761	359,259	372,423	391,820	412,563	434,466	460,722	487,582	519,396
New Zealand	55,086	56,203	57,894	62,361	67,239	72,021	76,314	79,527	80,742	85,564
Nicaragua	8,656	8,935	9,175	9,355	10,032	10,848	11,747	12,424	13,030	14,144
Niger	5,514	5,675	5,921	6,081	6,326	6,617	6,745	6,966	7,747	7,839
Nigeria	233,119	239,674	250,513	260,473	266,718	277,408	293,934	307,631	318,852	325,052
North Macedonia			12,503	11,840	11,875	11,990	12,356	12,739	13,318	14,094
Norway	106,126	112,852	119,538	125,887	135,055	143,612	153,509	164,108	170,476	176,662
Oman	31,154	34,154	37,899	41,181	43,678	46,748	48,979	52,902	54,943	55,886
Pakistan	204,273	222,009	244,256	255,289	272,132	291,901	316,860	327,813	343,079	362,485
Palau										
Panama	15,192	17,185	19,019	20,532	21,568	22,406	24,498	26,841	29,420	31,391
Papua New Guinea	5,528	6,261	7,290	8,457	9,544	9,409	10,213	9,730	10,300	10,640
Paraguay	21,754	23,275	24,209	26,007	27,975	30,510	31,557	33,463	33,862	33,872
Peru	71,707	75,777	77,085	83,050	95,264	104,469	109,360	118,450	119,313	122,810
Philippines	152,056	156,513	160,748	168,149	179,251	191,473	206,405	220,854	222,188	232,873
Poland	256,983	247,063	257,831	275,258	295,864	322,389	348,774	379,930	403,340	427,554
Portugal	138,469	147,977	156,086	158,687	164,490	171,813	181,089	192,319	203,831	214,791
Puerto Rico	43,089	45,573	48,739	52,211	55,558	59,303	61,786	65,919	71,005	75,187
Qatar	17,147	17,456	19,715	20,003	20,824	21,337	22,647	29,429	32,811	34,529
Romania	190,909	171,853	160,361	166,669	176,922	193,525	204,849	195,768	188,431	188,900
Russia			1,621,277	1,515,308	1,351,113	1,322,881	1,298,858	1,339,434	1,282,445	1,383,147
Rwanda	3,987	3,945	4,301	3,946	2,342	2,978	3,384	3,955	4,333	4,540
Samoa	307	310	330	343	373	406	443	454	465	468
San Marino								1,057	1,149	1,270
São Tomé and Príncipe	178	186	191	198	207	215	223	229	237	246
Saudi Arabia	377,176	421,989	451,376	463,829	478,249	489,797	515,247	538,007	559,309	563,630
Senegal	11,238	11,915	12,338	12,796	13,040	14,124	14,652	15,310	16,406	17,633
Serbia								51,375	54,728	49,771
Seychelles	572	608	667	732	730	749	838	957	992	1,024
Sierra Leone	7,815	7,434	6,870	7,037	7,438	6,833	5,233	4,387	4,399	4,099
Singapore	67,902	74,894	81,687	93,206	105,759	115,724	126,647	139,545	138,021	147,979
Slovakia				40,986	44,459	48,964	52,912	56,777	59,612	60,169
Slovenia			23,663	24,902	26,781	28,464	29,942	32,033	33,386	35,642
Solomon Islands	375	411	474	505	557	626	648	653	669	675
Somalia										
South Africa	246,272	252,010	252,245	261,409	275,535	290,031	308,041	321,500	326,740	339,316
South Sudan										
Spain	633,398	671,359	692,500	699,600	731,221	777,324	810,722	856,581	904,917	961,271
Sri Lanka	38,541	44,156	43,747	48,132	53,110	57,505	65,679	73,688	73,290	76,467
Saint Kitts and Nevis	331	350	369	398	429	453	489	533	545	574
Saint Lucia	1,002	1,040	1,148	1,182	1,226	1,274	1,335	1,349	1,450	1,510
Saint Vincent and the Grenadines	442	462	503	536	541	595	614	646	680	709
Sudan	39,615	43,832	47,315	49,769	52,618	58,481	62,806	67,759	74,168	78,403
Suriname	3,319	2,958	3,143	3,147	2,989	3,396	3,846	4,186	4,326	4,348
Sweden	174,795	178,668	180,803	181,707	193,040	205,156	212,474	222,762	234,830	248,158
Switzerland	229,038	234,639	239,657	245,133	253,533	260,178	266,443	276,719	287,460	296,289
Syria	36,426	41,698	48,298	53,105	57,241	61,610	64,599	64,997	69,378	68,163
Taiwan	194,504	217,918	241,408	263,970	289,839	315,147	340,738	367,589	387,351	419,277
Tajikistan			7,070	6,434	5,165	4,614	4,494	4,649	4,950	5,206
Tanzania	20,114	21,225	21,836	22,623	23,468	24,815	26,418	27,821	29,177	31,022
Thailand	243,843	273,273	305,298	339,649	374,644	413,558	444,932	440,141	411,110	435,991
Timor-Leste										
Togo	4,700	4,830	4,782	4,096	4,766	5,825	5,702	6,021	5,950	6,188
Tonga	235	257	253	259	270	297	303	306	317	328
Trinidad and Tobago	7,698	8,206	9,240	9,396	9,939	10,534	11,492	12,569	13,743	15,056
Tunisia	28,515	30,699	33,914	35,577	37,655	39,472	42,950	46,191	49,029	52,715
Turkey	402,307	419,766	455,025	503,272	485,974	531,836	579,522	633,892	660,840	649,732
Turkmenistan			9,626	8,869	7,491	7,097	6,743	6,084	6,565	7,756
Tuvalu										
Uganda	10,086	10,613	11,489	12,548	13,802	15,384	16,699	17,772	19,063	20,870
Ukraine			432,917	380,131	299,207	268,362	245,829	242,595	240,553	243,565
United Arab Emirates	110,620	116,850	123,270	126,522	138,850	151,157	162,236	179,172	182,776	192,462
United Kingdom	1,048,216	1,068,290	1,095,605	1,147,094	1,211,680	1,266,868	1,323,842	1,412,623	1,474,973	1,539,346
United States	5,963,125	6,158,125	6,520,325	6,858,550	7,287,250	7,639,750	8,073,125	8,577,550	9,062,825	9,631,175
Uruguay	21,217	22,710	25,070	26,347	28,869	29,047	31,229	33,513	35,421	35,226
Uzbekistan			44,613	44,620	43,203	43,712	45,269	48,444	51,095	54,046
Vanuatu	237	253	265	274	305	315	328	350	358	364
Venezuela	187,488	212,689	230,720	236,839	236,213	250,695	254,780	275,685	279,604	266,630
Vietnam	83,802	91,669	101,915	112,759	125,340	140,177	156,075	171,709	183,649	195,138
Palestine					5,848	6,395	6,591	7,688	8,889	9,762
Yemen										
Zambia	11,477	11,786	12,302	12,584	11,142	11,705	12,661	13,370	13,469	14,294
Zimbabwe									44,909	45,039

=== 2000s ===
IMF estimates (2000s)
Country / territory	2000	2001	2002	2003	2004	2005	2006	2007	2008	2009
Afghanistan			22,742	25,206	26,058	30,054	32,642	37,999	40,227	48,807
Albania	13,481	14,928	15,847	17,054	18,478	20,111	21,954	23,898	26,186	27,231
Algeria	227,195	239,279	256,120	278,153	298,485	324,469	344,175	364,458	380,766	387,712
Andorra	2,198	2,430	2,580	2,859	3,175	3,451	3,729	3,889	3,744	3,567
Angola	62,454	66,546	76,815	81,066	92,752	109,197	125,892	146,112	164,996	169,334
Antigua and Barbuda	1,096	1,070	1,098	1,187	1,290	1,416	1,645	1,847	1,883	1,668
Argentina	497,660	486,430	440,172	489,059	546,962	614,047	683,921	765,725	812,141	768,787
Armenia	8,993	10,078	11,745	13,658	15,478	18,167	21,199	24,767	26,998	23,321
Aruba	2,434	2,592	2,608	2,689	2,963	3,044	3,173	3,360	3,487	3,099
Australia	544,981	571,653	604,609	635,151	679,008	721,561	763,431	818,291	856,260	878,588
Austria	268,679	278,347	286,868	295,871	311,621	328,850	350,074	373,133	385,848	374,305
Azerbaijan	24,027	27,000	30,008	33,724	37,836	49,324	68,370	87,778	99,105	108,950
Bahamas	8,400	8,815	9,194	9,257	9,590	10,226	10,807	11,260	11,210	10,809
Bahrain	25,044	26,246	27,546	29,859	32,802	36,120	39,642	44,093	47,748	49,263
Bangladesh	215,804	231,867	244,496	261,140	282,212	310,085	340,974	374,932	405,137	428,201
Barbados	3,627	3,621	3,706	3,861	4,021	4,311	4,696	4,932	5,062	4,848
Belarus	58,259	62,391	66,565	72,667	83,165	93,888	106,463	118,774	133,423	134,476
Belgium	322,975	333,880	344,855	355,313	377,898	398,797	421,588	448,932	459,625	453,643
Belize	1,568	1,684	1,802	2,015	2,169	2,286	2,463	2,614	2,621	2,626
Benin	12,711	13,690	14,549	15,347	16,457	17,264	18,499	20,137	21,530	22,165
Bhutan	1,861	2,037	2,266	2,520	2,753	3,012	3,300	3,762	4,214	4,500
Bolivia	41,083	42,689	44,513	46,225	49,396	53,091	57,315	61,824	67,207	69,618
Bosnia and Herzegovina	19,765	21,734	23,181	24,553	26,808	28,726	31,215	33,940	36,476	35,598
Botswana	14,406	15,076	16,449	17,677	18,406	19,927	21,781	23,667	24,908	21,517
Brazil	1,455,848	1,509,318	1,579,574	1,629,137	1,769,302	1,883,216	2,018,204	2,198,704	2,355,228	2,366,771
Brunei	18,595	19,292	20,368	21,514	22,116	22,809	24,476	24,193	23,697	23,390
Bulgaria	62,415	66,260	71,241	76,452	83,619	92,327	101,648	111,350	120,451	117,138
Burkina Faso	11,329	12,350	13,088	14,388	15,437	17,300	18,948	20,262	21,850	22,636
Burundi	3,874	4,028	4,186	4,374	4,661	5,018	5,452	5,793	6,192	6,468
Cape Verde	1,403	1,523	1,629	1,786	1,924	2,100	2,362	2,794	3,049	3,021
Cambodia	15,551	16,782	18,519	20,386	22,662	26,672	30,480	34,375	38,206	40,477
Cameroon	32,554	34,727	36,845	39,621	43,555	45,922	49,141	52,657	55,199	56,972
Canada	921,798	960,227	1,004,396	1,042,727	1,103,876	1,175,043	1,243,233	1,303,091	1,341,414	1,310,343
Central African Republic	4,442	4,660	4,832	4,816	4,941	5,246	5,664	6,052	6,330	6,548
Chad	8,456	9,655	10,637	12,444	17,076	18,932	19,415	20,809	21,870	21,710
Chile	172,104	181,530	190,255	203,175	222,563	242,941	265,584	286,877	303,484	301,942
China	3,347,448	3,707,580	4,112,135	4,617,736	5,221,553	6,001,198	6,969,729	8,171,751	9,131,953	10,056,106
Colombia	261,560	271,937	283,078	299,977	324,471	349,528	384,508	421,537	443,765	451,591
Comoros	1,097	1,182	1,256	1,305	1,382	1,506	1,525	1,579	1,673	1,738
Democratic Republic of the Congo	24,274	24,299	25,404	27,624	30,540	34,586	37,474	41,772	45,728	46,270
Republic of the Congo	12,128	11,803	12,104	12,400	12,708	14,314	15,934	15,283	16,560	18,601
Costa Rica	36,377	38,494	40,428	43,006	46,116	49,454	54,714	60,813	64,922	64,752
Ivory Coast	52,009	53,245	53,170	53,483	55,598	58,328	61,038	63,799	66,681	69,274
Croatia	59,677	62,920	67,603	72,778	77,852	83,767	90,726	97,891	101,744	95,398
Cyprus	16,624	17,671	18,613	19,479	21,008	22,718	24,522	26,471	27,965	27,571
Czech Republic	191,133	201,138	207,355	218,429	234,926	257,739	283,284	306,929	321,014	307,496
Denmark	190,169	196,306	200,262	205,117	216,484	228,535	244,581	253,686	257,494	246,185
Djibouti	1,650	1,718	1,801	1,895	2,000	2,127	2,298	2,479	2,673	2,733
Dominica	482	493	486	527	558	579	625	683	745	741
Dominican Republic	58,759	61,565	65,327	65,718	69,230	78,135	87,932	97,014	102,114	103,775
Ecuador	70,482	75,101	80,026	83,960	92,109	100,126	107,694	112,716	122,430	124,529
Egypt	413,265	437,462	458,413	482,391	515,632	555,583	611,912	673,036	735,094	774,195
El Salvador	29,049	29,964	30,909	32,013	33,166	35,133	37,789	39,535	41,154	40,545
Equatorial Guinea	5,845	9,564	11,619	13,561	18,158	20,265	22,248	26,343	31,629	32,252
Eritrea	2,943	3,272	3,423	3,398	3,540	3,745	3,823	3,982	3,270	3,691
Estonia	18,204	19,708	21,402	23,482	25,754	29,091	32,915	36,367	35,167	30,207
Eswatini	4,124	4,261	4,517	4,785	5,092	5,567	6,082	6,524	6,704	6,851
Ethiopia	36,581	40,173	41,450	41,381	47,465	55,122	63,356	72,751	82,458	91,263
Fiji	5,772	6,014	6,303	6,478	7,012	7,138	7,498	7,632	7,856	7,794
Finland	150,104	157,537	162,684	169,233	180,744	191,590	205,437	222,214	228,270	211,130
France	1,743,494	1,815,502	1,864,487	1,920,090	2,021,384	2,126,199	2,256,120	2,374,684	2,426,742	2,375,175
Gabon	15,241	15,919	16,126	16,814	17,385	18,630	18,506	20,241	20,006	19,888
Gambia	2,265	2,450	2,407	2,623	2,883	2,904	2,977	3,151	3,412	3,662
Georgia	14,181	15,192	16,274	18,459	20,054	22,666	25,566	29,562	30,860	29,917
Germany	2,608,076	2,710,349	2,746,222	2,785,422	2,893,797	3,010,989	3,223,574	3,406,637	3,502,937	3,329,070
Ghana	41,499	44,058	46,808	50,173	54,306	59,498	64,901	69,375	77,077	81,958
Greece	221,099	236,591	251,519	271,353	293,635	306,427	336,230	357,450	364,545	351,684
Grenada	839	840	883	985	1,005	1,174	1,162	1,267	1,303	1,225
Guatemala	64,325	67,815	71,513	74,792	79,213	84,373	91,630	100,077	105,364	106,520
Guinea	16,991	18,033	19,311	19,941	20,968	22,294	23,570	26,027	28,017	29,539
Guinea-Bissau	1,576	1,688	1,777	1,807	1,878	2,063	2,184	2,300	2,451	2,526
Guyana	4,270	4,464	4,586	4,646	4,846	4,900	5,311	5,837	6,067	6,307
Haiti	18,828	19,186	19,689	20,777	21,054	22,382	23,480	25,251	26,422	28,150
Honduras	20,187	21,203	22,341	23,818	25,983	28,419	31,220	34,050	36,175	35,512
Hong Kong	174,313	179,238	185,038	194,458	217,060	240,406	265,249	290,047	301,926	296,317
Hungary	144,295	153,546	163,317	173,155	186,624	200,766	215,114	221,673	228,164	214,066
Iceland	8,847	9,394	9,592	10,004	11,056	12,204	13,294	14,848	15,391	14,198
India	1,970,978	2,112,577	2,227,014	2,449,490	2,714,643	3,021,605	3,365,868	3,721,896	3,910,688	4,244,160
Indonesia	850,667	901,512	956,715	1,022,241	1,102,538	1,201,842	1,307,057	1,427,649	1,563,440	1,647,046
Iran	542,562	568,049	623,482	690,719	740,051	787,604	852,486	946,993	967,657	983,433
Iraq	160,302	166,807	155,502	100,445	158,210	165,905	180,664	189,063	208,561	216,939
Ireland	135,875	146,307	157,345	165,288	181,119	197,536	213,781	231,250	225,134	214,984
Israel	138,939	142,519	144,372	149,523	160,555	172,711	188,004	205,192	215,908	219,922
Italy	1,798,832	1,876,238	1,910,540	1,949,556	2,031,486	2,111,165	2,215,431	2,308,730	2,329,129	2,219,165
Jamaica	18,553	19,214	19,644	20,767	21,607	22,484	23,849	24,849	25,121	24,414
Japan	3,396,568	3,482,929	3,540,062	3,659,772	3,837,587	4,031,081	4,219,650	4,408,878	4,441,386	4,203,514
Jordan	33,380	35,834	38,787	41,127	45,720	51,314	57,401	63,892	70,531	74,597
Kazakhstan	111,230	129,088	143,940	160,432	180,560	204,285	233,121	260,747	274,540	279,548
Kenya	72,974	77,586	79,171	83,115	89,306	97,324	106,198	116,548	119,069	123,765
Kiribati	131	130	134	134	137	143	156	165	163	165
South Korea	819,451	877,501	960,147	1,009,207	1,090,064	1,173,244	1,272,859	1,383,719	1,452,749	1,473,693
Kosovo	7,369	7,879	7,966	8,330	8,606	9,276	9,906	11,024	11,440	12,090
Kuwait	76,701	78,595	82,222	98,373	111,362	127,040	140,798	153,278	160,105	149,693
Kyrgyzstan	11,039	11,889	12,071	13,175	14,480	14,908	15,844	17,664	19,366	20,048
Laos	10,962	11,744	12,739	13,793	15,182	16,744	18,806	20,832	22,895	24,734
Latvia	20,970	22,827	24,959	27,597	30,812	35,469	41,252	46,782	46,067	38,917
Lebanon	47,589	50,558	53,090	55,058	60,779	64,231	67,237	75,488	83,920	93,078
Lesotho	2,603	2,750	2,860	3,040	3,187	3,396	3,648	3,935	4,118	4,164
Liberia	3,652	3,837	4,069	2,947	3,147	3,436	3,842	4,463	4,827	5,109
Libya	81,255	85,267	83,365	98,735	107,316	122,435	126,562	138,090	140,521	135,167
Liechtenstein	3,027	3,065	3,102	3,078	3,276	3,557	3,956	4,381	4,380	3,882
Lithuania	34,758	37,902	41,010	46,223	50,461	56,300	62,277	71,062	74,017	63,670
Luxembourg	31,509	33,209	34,813	36,430	38,992	41,213	45,040	50,007	50,816	49,473
Macau		16,711	18,482	21,041	27,362	30,500	35,651	41,919	44,176	45,026
Madagascar	18,933	20,517	18,250	20,431	22,084	23,860	25,923	28,146	30,614	29,577
Malawi	8,666	8,500	8,784	9,468	10,250	10,917	11,782	13,263	14,552	15,861
Malaysia	277,599	285,318	305,373	329,428	361,231	391,097	425,672	464,744	496,587	492,086
Maldives	2,654	2,753	2,966	3,452	3,759	3,442	4,386	4,825	5,360	4,953
Mali	17,052	20,192	21,128	23,656	24,651	26,069	27,865	29,123	30,764	32,643
Malta	7,812	7,928	8,271	8,746	9,018	9,569	10,095	10,890	11,589	11,498
Marshall Islands	110	120	126	127	129	136	140	149	141	147
Mauritania	8,422	8,542	8,795	9,590	10,314	11,549	14,087	14,184	14,409	14,512
Mauritius	10,724	11,318	11,681	12,624	13,521	14,147	15,396	16,725	17,978	18,697
Mexico	1,381,311	1,406,045	1,424,517	1,469,862	1,563,201	1,646,290	1,778,604	1,864,749	1,918,602	1,808,909
Federated States of Micronesia	233	244	248	257	255	270	277	280	278	282
Moldova	10,488	11,378	12,456	13,540	14,933	16,557	17,887	18,922	20,791	19,664
Mongolia	7,939	8,494	9,081	9,941	11,171	12,271	13,682	15,283	16,795	16,549
Montenegro	5,466	5,650	5,847	6,112	6,552	7,041	7,883	8,671	9,448	8,936
Morocco	102,322	112,527	118,065	128,001	137,755	146,306	162,521	171,441	185,094	194,139
Mozambique	7,860	9,069	10,101	11,044	12,271	13,455	15,244	16,855	18,361	19,570
Myanmar	40,906	47,042	52,516	60,620	71,785	84,080	98,207	113,477	124,405	130,661
Namibia	9,513	9,959	10,790	11,386	12,467	13,459	14,421	15,352	16,062	16,209
Nauru					44	45	50	40	49	47
Nepal	36,703	39,641	40,306	42,723	45,926	49,014	52,226	55,471	59,991	63,097
Netherlands	553,617	579,261	589,711	601,943	630,574	663,544	708,213	755,638	786,576	762,379
New Zealand	91,189	95,596	101,651	108,244	116,540	124,058	131,484	139,757	142,222	141,587
Nicaragua	15,058	15,853	16,221	16,958	18,345	19,724	21,106	22,778	24,014	23,367
Niger	7,920	8,687	9,256	9,645	9,940	11,004	12,016	12,729	13,978	14,340
Nigeria	350,759	382,568	445,253	497,190	563,871	622,311	684,649	754,659	824,573	898,963
North Macedonia	15,067	14,934	15,392	16,045	17,247	18,628	20,189	22,078	23,735	23,796
Norway	186,885	195,227	201,150	207,370	222,167	235,938	250,139	265,704	273,050	270,302
Oman	60,691	64,920	65,412	65,240	68,329	72,430	78,151	84,266	93,576	99,786
Pakistan	385,182	408,183	425,401	456,214	504,511	561,945	612,084	660,796	703,464	715,327
Palau	163	179	190	190	201	214	221	228	220	207
Panama	33,453	34,531	35,948	38,526	42,796	47,791	54,121	62,899	70,648	72,230
Papua New Guinea	10,609	10,835	10,986	12,216	12,617	13,566	14,339	15,879	16,137	17,340
Paraguay	33,838	34,311	34,837	37,060	39,601	41,714	45,067	48,798	52,969	53,156
Peru	128,976	132,694	142,106	150,946	162,692	178,339	197,680	220,331	245,071	249,285
Philippines	248,585	261,932	275,888	295,646	323,540	350,178	380,168	415,923	442,354	451,528
Poland	455,864	471,747	485,993	512,881	553,097	589,469	645,442	707,724	752,575	777,056
Portugal	228,039	237,706	243,261	245,755	256,877	267,004	279,711	294,490	301,121	293,519
Puerto Rico	79,406	88,881	92,222	96,244	100,796	101,891	103,552	105,122	105,171	103,753
Qatar	37,764	40,352	43,796	46,441	56,858	63,210	83,458	101,311	121,328	138,023
Romania	198,821	213,906	229,619	239,634	271,738	293,342	326,667	359,788	400,851	381,073
Russia	1,556,696	1,672,634	1,779,247	1,947,833	2,143,132	2,351,723	2,622,193	2,923,515	3,136,188	2,908,738
Rwanda	5,031	5,581	6,416	6,686	7,378	8,322	9,373	10,363	11,743	12,552
Samoa	503	552	593	636	673	740	780	805	849	850
San Marino	1,328	1,433	1,460	1,547	1,661	1,754	1,878	2,065	2,097	1,896
São Tomé and Príncipe	253	265	276	299	319	353	397	421	464	482
Saudi Arabia	603,593	619,310	624,605	692,787	772,818	844,436	899,321	944,133	1,022,350	1,017,683
Senegal	18,734	19,981	20,306	21,865	23,495	25,277	26,663	28,160	29,765	30,773
Serbia	53,981	58,938	63,769	67,992	74,490	81,361	87,141	96,512	103,448	100,815
Seychelles	1,092	1,091	1,122	1,077	1,074	1,207	1,362	1,544	1,541	1,534
Sierra Leone	4,351	5,258	6,751	7,593	8,406	9,253	9,976	10,629	11,250	11,468
Singapore	165,008	166,917	176,161	187,810	212,030	234,787	263,827	295,420	306,723	309,009
Slovakia	62,018	65,269	69,211	74,005	80,091	87,959	98,765	112,415	120,726	114,783
Slovenia	37,724	39,665	41,603	43,780	47,001	50,343	54,962	60,482	63,725	59,252
Solomon Islands	592	557	550	597	660	731	785	836	905	936
Somalia										
South Africa	361,576	379,700	399,869	419,789	450,710	489,373	532,734	576,498	606,355	600,711
South Sudan										
Spain	1,032,718	1,097,356	1,145,117	1,202,046	1,272,813	1,359,343	1,457,923	1,550,334	1,592,322	1,541,773
Sri Lanka	84,781	85,002	89,539	96,731	104,741	114,768	127,379	139,723	150,888	157,191
Saint Kitts and Nevis	666	715	738	724	773	879	936	972	1,054	1,025
Saint Lucia	1,544	1,525	1,556	1,654	1,822	1,871	2,052	2,149	2,297	2,268
Saint Vincent and the Grenadines	737	765	815	882	940	991	1,089	1,153	1,180	1,173
Sudan	86,902	98,515	105,990	114,880	124,028	135,143	148,409	161,172	170,596	166,897
Suriname	4,442	4,765	5,020	5,436	5,990	6,482	7,067	7,629	8,098	8,394
Sweden	265,533	275,206	285,849	296,975	317,706	336,821	363,444	385,329	389,127	374,865
Switzerland	314,281	326,540	332,904	338,452	356,180	378,350	406,389	434,078	453,438	447,308
Syria	71,307	75,596	81,297	81,214	89,154	97,665	105,757	114,786	122,235	130,260
Taiwan	455,849	459,578	492,314	523,242	574,665	624,591	681,005	747,369	767,851	760,120
Tajikistan	5,766	6,497	7,198	8,089	9,187	10,110	11,152	12,347	13,579	14,196
Tanzania	33,290	36,081	39,267	42,799	47,391	52,479	56,619	63,075	67,869	71,963
Thailand	465,732	492,620	531,038	580,453	633,549	680,779	736,636	797,715	827,114	826,467
Timor-Leste	1,655	1,969	1,866	1,861	1,919	2,038	2,014	2,281	2,590	2,870
Togo	6,267	6,460	6,812	7,413	7,538	7,411	7,842	8,155	8,648	9,176
Tonga	349	362	384	392	395	405	409	409	437	417
Trinidad and Tobago	16,460	17,453	18,992	22,054	24,307	26,547	31,247	33,459	35,224	33,732
Tunisia	56,227	59,675	61,404	65,561	71,522	76,337	82,817	90,768	96,437	99,985
Turkey	710,863	687,186	742,777	801,365	904,591	1,017,964	1,123,522	1,212,907	1,247,648	1,194,048
Turkmenistan	9,406	11,579	13,613	16,255	19,145	22,320	25,531	29,123	34,061	36,373
Tuvalu	23	24	26	26	26	25	27	29	32	30
Uganda	22,184	24,672	26,824	29,038	31,549	35,795	39,500	43,841	49,346	53,656
Ukraine	263,755	293,513	313,991	350,661	402,563	427,938	474,535	527,435	549,657	469,335
United Arab Emirates	221,073	229,214	238,440	264,546	297,647	321,885	364,453	386,247	406,254	387,328
United Kingdom	1,645,795	1,723,135	1,779,856	1,873,016	1,968,537	2,086,007	2,197,889	2,325,010	2,370,280	2,277,179
United States	10,250,950	10,581,925	10,929,100	11,456,450	12,217,175	13,039,200	13,815,600	14,474,250	14,769,850	14,478,050
Uruguay	35,329	34,735	32,548	33,458	36,076	39,983	42,906	46,951	51,290	53,796
Uzbekistan	57,370	61,126	64,559	68,599	75,656	83,490	92,520	104,054	115,604	125,738
Vanuatu	394	390	375	399	426	463	517	547	588	610
Venezuela	282,723	298,902	276,666	260,248	316,116	359,668	407,361	455,023	478,984	462,199
Vietnam	213,103	232,925	253,293	277,256	306,888	340,400	375,383	413,041	444,833	471,737
Palestine	9,129	8,465	7,523	8,747	10,951	12,570	12,828	13,675	14,974	16,361
Yemen										
Zambia	15,188	16,356	17,358	18,930	20,806	23,011	25,596	28,485	31,291	34,387
Zimbabwe	44,110	44,899	42,084	35,952	34,604	33,043	32,851	32,593	27,799	30,039

=== 2010s ===
IMF estimates (2010s)
Country / territory	2010	2011	2012	2013	2014	2015	2016	2017	2018	2019
Afghanistan	53,568	58,216	67,583	72,639	75,898	77,358	79,784	83,362	89,369	97,801
Albania	28,584	29,916	30,905	31,746	32,872	33,965	35,831	37,335	39,267	42,110
Algeria	411,260	432,338	450,957	470,557	498,381	519,103	544,473	562,537	583,472	601,471
Andorra	3,539	3,612	3,496	3,430	3,577	3,662	3,834	3,916	4,152	4,395
Angola	180,458	190,794	210,865	224,920	239,501	243,561	241,695	245,679	261,964	279,132
Antigua and Barbuda	1,556	1,557	1,639	1,657	1,723	1,764	1,854	1,938	2,230	2,426
Argentina	856,919	927,110	934,679	973,452	965,522	1,001,097	989,586	1,035,699	1,090,043	1,057,633
Armenia	24,123	25,778	28,136	29,568	31,168	32,475	32,847	35,949	38,233	44,366
Aruba	3,051	3,219	3,245	3,512	3,624	3,790	3,873	4,080	4,279	4,210
Australia	910,857	955,227	1,010,723	1,051,000	1,096,668	1,132,503	1,174,155	1,223,711	1,293,239	1,371,698
Austria	385,707	405,190	415,327	421,337	431,916	441,606	455,241	473,924	500,696	535,947
Azerbaijan	115,787	118,295	123,152	132,566	138,608	141,405	138,375	141,070	151,910	167,158
Bahamas	11,108	11,407	12,258	12,110	12,548	12,791	12,755	13,398	13,855	14,301
Bahrain	52,024	54,122	57,226	61,280	65,034	67,284	70,514	75,333	78,150	83,980
Bangladesh	457,554	497,183	539,467	581,642	627,641	674,975	729,859	791,891	897,768	997,250
Barbados	4,797	4,892	4,841	4,933	5,059	5,067	5,187	5,315	5,551	5,620
Belarus	146,788	157,645	163,154	167,472	174,731	169,599	166,885	174,175	189,021	210,076
Belgium	471,601	490,625	500,840	510,921	528,998	541,776	553,451	571,671	599,541	651,570
Belize	2,695	2,747	2,909	3,079	3,254	3,375	3,406	3,404	3,611	4,051
Benin	22,909	24,075	25,703	28,020	30,321	31,146	32,492	34,935	36,918	40,925
Bhutan	5,025	5,667	6,163	6,482	6,847	7,345	7,978	8,539	8,890	9,464
Bolivia	73,615	79,279	85,156	92,789	99,861	105,766	111,406	118,215	123,812	128,448
Bosnia and Herzegovina	36,343	37,449	37,832	39,380	40,529	42,657	44,459	46,723	50,326	54,963
Botswana	23,983	26,151	26,593	30,048	32,313	31,031	33,582	35,589	36,294	37,153
Brazil	2,575,879	2,733,512	2,837,901	2,972,929	3,039,952	2,959,374	2,889,626	2,980,287	3,187,190	3,333,776
Brunei	24,323	25,755	26,474	26,352	26,139	26,278	25,871	26,684	28,523	30,701
Bulgaria	120,405	125,458	128,751	130,232	133,758	139,586	145,177	151,835	161,044	177,101
Burkina Faso	24,846	27,038	29,319	31,545	33,483	35,119	37,565	40,610	42,426	46,961
Burundi	6,882	7,307	7,774	8,296	8,798	8,533	8,563	8,760	8,936	9,533
Cape Verde	3,114	3,303	3,401	3,481	3,566	3,633	3,825	4,070	4,064	4,442
Cambodia	43,127	47,877	53,214	58,358	62,842	67,760	73,436	80,417	90,470	99,485
Cameroon	59,337	62,607	66,723	71,249	76,636	81,730	86,249	90,903	99,493	108,174
Canada	1,367,261	1,439,250	1,491,786	1,552,463	1,624,889	1,650,628	1,683,619	1,765,763	1,852,988	1,899,695
Central African Republic	6,935	7,375	7,892	5,105	5,198	5,474	5,789	6,159	6,419	7,307
Chad	25,005	26,683	29,600	30,984	32,254	33,579	32,660	32,551	35,607	39,007
Chile	323,495	350,719	379,239	398,454	412,661	425,453	437,025	450,892	478,094	491,729
China	11,255,877	12,573,851	13,813,093	15,139,826	16,557,447	17,883,962	19,277,150	20,974,552	22,862,470	24,777,566
Colombia	477,623	521,347	551,832	590,037	627,322	651,860	671,790	693,117	747,104	807,591
Comoros	1,826	1,941	2,040	2,167	2,251	2,298	2,397	2,533	2,528	2,590
Democratic Republic of the Congo	50,506	55,462	61,392	68,446	74,724	80,213	81,295	86,260	94,448	98,168
Republic of the Congo	20,697	21,590	24,179	24,415	26,492	26,848	24,750	23,783	30,668	31,763
Costa Rica	69,052	73,579	78,609	81,941	86,322	90,304	94,995	100,717	106,835	117,296
Ivory Coast	71,530	69,460	78,440	87,172	96,490	105,997	114,678	125,384	135,828	155,524
Croatia	95,267	97,122	96,722	98,235	99,389	102,639	107,204	112,710	118,823	130,585
Cyprus	28,542	29,253	28,770	27,332	27,315	28,510	30,673	33,018	35,608	39,791
Czech Republic	319,682	332,060	335,636	341,206	354,943	376,002	389,371	416,849	442,611	486,787
Denmark	253,125	261,739	266,599	274,914	283,277	291,914	303,751	318,640	331,591	352,325
Djibouti	2,881	3,155	3,369	3,598	3,924	4,250	4,596	4,933	5,448	5,877
Dominica	755	769	775	780	832	816	847	805	907	1,032
Dominican Republic	113,861	119,919	125,543	133,980	146,007	157,659	169,853	179,696	194,021	215,340
Ecuador	131,120	145,176	156,431	170,567	180,871	182,768	183,236	197,653	207,781	217,496
Egypt	823,938	855,777	891,117	936,209	980,427	1,032,671	1,087,724	1,153,591	1,302,980	1,437,312
El Salvador	41,901	44,397	46,498	48,345	50,029	51,702	53,521	55,706	57,246	60,710
Equatorial Guinea	29,731	32,324	35,662	34,770	35,523	32,586	29,996	28,802	30,232	27,477
Eritrea	4,141	5,314	5,515	5,022	6,690	5,360	5,811	5,322	6,095	6,369
Estonia	31,324	34,402	36,329	37,596	39,522	40,622	42,277	45,459	49,073	53,854
Eswatini	7,198	7,511	8,064	8,518	8,844	9,079	9,435	9,942	9,977	10,912
Ethiopia	102,163	116,158	128,615	143,753	161,322	179,752	195,977	219,854	236,067	259,535
Fiji	8,125	8,517	8,798	9,371	10,069	10,620	10,983	11,778	12,131	11,874
Finland	220,465	230,390	231,105	232,736	235,657	238,954	247,429	260,180	271,632	288,648
France	2,448,190	2,560,729	2,614,334	2,683,576	2,757,557	2,810,938	2,858,559	2,975,790	3,114,876	3,445,275
Gabon	21,615	23,625	25,329	27,181	28,881	30,279	31,206	31,915	34,049	36,169
Gambia	3,926	3,681	3,946	4,128	4,141	4,349	4,476	4,776	5,465	5,950
Georgia	32,383	35,678	38,733	41,415	43,860	45,750	47,778	51,144	55,980	62,388
Germany	3,509,131	3,716,563	3,804,962	3,887,410	4,043,820	4,153,577	4,289,280	4,492,398	4,691,809	4,956,676
Ghana	89,407	103,986	114,842	125,254	131,075	135,097	140,982	155,172	169,625	187,633
Greece	335,691	308,778	288,323	286,568	293,869	295,919	298,636	308,462	319,755	342,312
Grenada	1,233	1,268	1,277	1,329	1,452	1,560	1,633	1,736	1,848	1,907
Guatemala	110,924	117,926	123,695	130,449	138,619	145,631	150,951	158,387	167,561	183,966
Guinea	30,985	32,966	36,192	38,003	41,318	42,176	46,637	53,251	54,637	61,748
Guinea-Bissau	2,700	2,979	2,982	3,132	3,217	3,446	3,664	3,908	3,956	4,118
Guyana	6,663	7,170	7,672	8,087	8,367	8,503	8,910	9,409	9,849	10,694
Haiti	26,882	28,836	29,520	31,321	32,416	33,555	34,488	35,986	35,156	35,396
Honduras	37,285	39,514	41,912	43,815	45,941	48,148	50,498	53,892	55,011	57,523
Hong Kong	320,216	342,558	354,870	372,103	389,042	402,029	414,678	438,128	453,865	459,644
Hungary	218,985	227,805	228,923	237,563	252,179	263,813	272,826	289,157	313,130	345,400
Iceland	14,051	14,539	14,983	15,786	16,368	17,142	18,381	19,363	20,495	22,092
India	4,660,779	5,006,266	5,377,727	5,818,528	6,358,545	6,930,719	7,574,236	8,233,798	9,074,934	9,741,183
Indonesia	1,773,382	1,921,643	2,075,456	2,228,082	2,380,385	2,519,629	2,671,590	2,857,305	3,069,919	3,266,186
Iran	1,053,097	1,135,616	1,113,415	1,115,131	1,191,108	1,185,033	1,274,479	1,336,571	1,319,678	1,212,413
Iraq	233,634	256,449	297,630	325,786	333,908	345,555	405,254	406,286	490,276	511,123
Ireland	221,270	229,464	232,801	241,949	269,299	338,793	346,190	388,004	422,791	457,840
Israel	234,906	253,119	264,091	279,688	295,112	304,367	321,221	341,163	354,660	371,317
Italy	2,280,484	2,343,725	2,312,752	2,309,352	2,349,541	2,392,348	2,444,937	2,528,636	2,609,653	2,787,072
Jamaica	24,356	25,213	25,554	26,047	26,653	27,284	28,304	29,471	30,324	30,618
Japan	4,430,592	4,512,946	4,672,775	4,847,222	4,976,324	5,112,912	5,197,882	5,376,868	5,464,294	5,539,374
Jordan	77,495	81,394	84,903	88,699	93,243	96,482	99,456	103,775	103,471	109,981
Kazakhstan	303,601	333,105	356,272	383,714	407,184	415,073	422,788	447,144	475,138	551,108
Kenya	135,364	145,232	154,695	163,303	174,488	184,856	194,475	205,511	221,492	240,007
Kiribati	169	178	192	211	217	244	263	278	294	309
South Korea	1,595,742	1,688,732	1,763,999	1,853,071	1,945,954	2,021,368	2,105,293	2,216,570	2,347,692	2,407,645
Kosovo	12,842	13,935	14,528	15,242	15,679	16,732	17,789	18,691	19,771	21,053
Kuwait	147,921	165,509	179,762	184,923	189,086	191,972	199,467	193,471	222,102	225,239
Kyrgyzstan	20,196	21,840	22,227	25,073	26,537	27,821	29,303	31,242	30,789	34,956
Laos	27,042	29,804	32,729	35,957	39,369	42,623	46,049	50,105	53,367	56,188
Latvia	37,948	39,906	43,619	45,291	47,045	49,279	51,016	53,695	57,464	61,623
Lebanon	101,723	104,722	109,640	115,730	120,630	122,351	125,521	128,781	132,494	126,060
Lesotho	4,430	4,805	5,127	5,278	5,449	5,699	5,886	5,791	5,778	5,644
Liberia	5,499	6,045	6,676	7,389	7,570	7,641	7,588	7,914	8,496	8,890
Libya	143,687	72,829	138,599	115,588	90,503	90,573	90,070	121,473	129,306	112,565
Liechtenstein	4,244	4,151	4,221	4,507	4,748	4,807	4,970	5,285	5,552	5,642
Lithuania	64,626	70,137	74,569	78,932	83,333	86,499	89,603	95,498	102,894	114,036
Luxembourg	51,958	53,584	55,481	58,216	60,783	62,739	66,488	68,570	70,911	75,251
Macau	57,013	70,772	78,734	88,708	88,413	69,821	69,990	78,310	85,300	84,692
Madagascar	30,122	31,229	32,768	34,092	35,844	37,310	39,169	41,438	42,524	45,498
Malawi	17,157	18,361	19,056	20,388	21,925	22,782	23,520	24,899	25,272	27,521
Malaysia	535,561	575,545	618,352	658,393	710,097	752,573	793,531	854,694	914,713	967,568
Maldives	5,356	5,935	6,188	6,732	7,383	7,740	8,312	9,059	10,361	11,255
Mali	34,882	36,647	36,929	38,793	42,035	45,072	48,233	51,736	54,984	59,534
Malta	12,359	12,739	13,509	14,603	15,991	17,693	18,589	21,377	23,314	25,897
Marshall Islands	157	159	160	169	170	174	180	190	205	230
Mauritania	15,074	16,027	17,055	18,065	19,165	20,383	20,836	22,540	23,550	25,064
Mauritius	19,757	21,000	22,142	23,284	24,604	25,755	27,010	28,581	29,195	30,418
Mexico	1,921,914	2,029,125	2,140,347	2,195,324	2,289,484	2,373,175	2,438,189	2,528,308	2,606,266	2,636,530
Federated States of Micronesia	292	309	309	303	300	317	323	336	346	363
Moldova	21,317	23,022	23,313	25,854	27,619	27,680	29,229	31,002	32,130	35,736
Mongolia	17,975	21,518	24,619	27,955	30,685	31,716	32,494	34,941	39,517	44,457
Montenegro	9,298	9,812	9,746	10,248	10,674	11,044	11,533	12,117	13,208	14,857
Morocco	203,996	219,127	229,926	244,445	255,341	268,907	272,877	291,814	283,691	295,694
Mozambique	21,131	23,106	25,417	27,549	30,187	32,720	34,582	36,130	38,467	41,503
Myanmar	139,188	149,832	162,521	178,343	196,327	209,766	226,071	244,240	291,769	320,969
Namibia	17,397	18,660	19,970	21,450	23,153	24,364	24,604	24,788	25,396	25,470
Nauru	47	55	70	74	88	91	96	92	92	102
Nepal	66,940	70,659	75,336	79,319	85,552	89,779	91,024	100,972	111,087	121,063
Netherlands	781,807	812,115	819,151	832,827	860,993	887,416	917,570	959,996	1,013,552	1,081,371
New Zealand	145,804	151,342	158,068	164,184	173,372	181,367	190,327	200,108	205,575	222,533
Nicaragua	24,694	26,795	29,067	31,019	33,069	34,976	36,919	39,321	37,986	38,779
Niger	15,760	16,464	18,539	19,855	21,543	22,699	24,230	25,897	28,249	32,635
Nigeria	1,012,333	1,083,717	1,151,134	1,233,880	1,334,581	1,382,697	1,373,267	1,409,126	1,466,987	1,581,909
North Macedonia	24,894	26,002	26,365	27,598	29,098	30,500	31,667	32,583	34,873	37,943
Norway	276,337	285,945	299,494	308,469	320,417	330,002	337,440	352,653	385,742	393,766
Oman	103,495	108,688	120,525	128,983	132,926	140,891	149,407	152,545	173,710	171,026
Pakistan	740,417	779,909	819,823	865,929	912,343	955,907	1,004,281	1,069,379	1,129,964	1,162,667
Palau	204	217	226	227	240	263	270	266	270	276
Panama	77,547	88,573	98,908	106,953	113,850	120,958	127,691	137,443	135,303	140,760
Papua New Guinea	19,329	19,946	21,264	22,453	25,938	27,900	29,712	31,313	31,941	33,923
Paraguay	59,772	63,620	64,346	70,868	75,925	78,895	83,044	88,598	90,877	92,185
Peru	273,338	296,630	320,704	345,251	359,632	374,775	393,292	410,419	430,781	455,680
Philippines	490,535	519,973	566,185	614,692	665,098	713,885	772,193	840,501	914,883	988,832
Poland	811,420	872,040	901,488	923,468	976,208	1,028,590	1,069,986	1,145,711	1,228,298	1,362,291
Portugal	302,248	303,199	296,333	298,411	305,859	313,606	322,930	339,609	358,872	389,495
Puerto Rico	104,580	106,355	108,367	109,874	110,457	110,312	109,952	108,692	110,918	119,615
Qatar	164,491	186,860	199,343	214,000	229,341	242,472	252,276	252,949	283,965	283,662
Romania	370,640	395,293	410,318	418,465	443,278	461,516	479,226	527,787	572,200	647,503
Russia	3,076,938	3,265,874	3,460,550	3,581,230	3,670,432	3,631,416	3,673,023	3,807,099	4,205,230	4,579,554
Rwanda	13,638	15,026	16,628	17,711	19,039	20,920	22,315	23,784	26,578	30,337
Samoa	882	935	917	933	956	1,002	1,092	1,127	1,146	1,217
San Marino	1,806	1,686	1,593	1,607	1,624	1,683	1,739	1,775	1,880	1,991
São Tomé and Príncipe	495	515	541	578	617	632	671	711	828	993
Saudi Arabia	1,081,961	1,234,136	1,329,543	1,392,003	1,473,247	1,556,137	1,597,694	1,645,531	1,792,987	1,790,603
Senegal	32,203	33,306	35,284	36,751	39,718	42,639	45,780	50,052	53,794	59,655
Serbia	103,684	105,881	107,374	109,694	109,591	112,041	116,471	121,359	128,962	142,984
Seychelles	1,650	1,780	1,883	2,037	2,170	2,386	2,700	2,940	3,105	3,341
Sierra Leone	12,777	13,968	15,188	16,903	17,090	16,717	17,665	18,690	19,948	20,908
Singapore	358,177	388,287	413,060	440,329	465,629	483,940	507,645	539,095	587,541	601,850
Slovakia	124,067	129,872	134,366	137,614	143,803	152,650	157,103	164,514	171,627	185,363
Slovenia	60,639	62,295	61,605	62,138	64,966	67,139	69,833	74,762	80,094	88,492
Solomon Islands	1,040	1,140	1,189	1,274	1,311	1,345	1,434	1,504	1,581	1,635
Somalia		18,994	19,580	21,040	21,994	23,217	23,139	25,791	23,975	25,014
South Africa	626,493	659,680	688,064	717,168	739,975	756,715	768,982	791,817	782,329	796,183
South Sudan		14,616	7,396	9,574	9,892	9,961	8,718	8,360	6,088	7,797
Spain	1,561,979	1,584,005	1,567,270	1,571,193	1,622,865	1,704,439	1,770,795	1,854,710	1,918,773	2,075,230
Sri Lanka	171,855	190,608	210,917	223,198	241,568	254,065	269,441	291,985	307,238	307,705
Saint Kitts and Nevis	1,037	1,075	1,107	1,188	1,298	1,300	1,364	1,392	1,427	1,497
Saint Lucia	2,307	2,469	2,506	2,492	2,568	2,586	2,710	2,846	3,085	3,316
Saint Vincent and the Grenadines	1,136	1,153	1,186	1,236	1,272	1,320	1,388	1,434	1,541	1,598
Sudan	175,443	173,309	146,516	151,923	161,774	171,286	181,041	185,698	192,299	183,587
Suriname	8,935	9,652	10,097	10,570	10,781	10,510	10,089	10,430	10,705	11,977
Sweden	401,240	422,476	428,559	440,811	458,785	483,362	498,355	516,831	538,902	584,969
Switzerland	467,268	483,860	498,677	516,589	538,888	551,484	567,396	586,026	614,696	645,703
Syria	136,379									
Taiwan	848,181	897,478	934,492	973,996	1,037,722	1,062,698	1,096,022	1,156,502	1,183,021	1,242,247
Tajikistan	15,302	16,774	18,367	20,062	21,779	23,300	25,145	27,412	28,565	32,973
Tanzania	77,469	85,317	91,374	99,231	107,757	115,457	124,558	135,318	146,044	164,885
Thailand	899,363	925,630	1,011,155	1,056,002	1,084,972	1,129,360	1,179,255	1,250,522	1,347,311	1,427,827
Timor-Leste	3,176	3,435	3,668	3,845	4,089	4,230	4,399	4,335	4,544	5,928
Togo	9,831	10,618	11,498	12,374	13,299	14,157	15,111	15,998	17,071	18,743
Tonga	425	463	483	486	504	515	554	582	598	606
Trinidad and Tobago	35,323	35,983	38,350	40,313	42,540	42,692	39,901	38,650	38,984	39,956
Tunisia	104,754	104,727	111,175	115,815	121,473	123,787	126,360	131,520	139,320	148,377
Turkey	1,311,798	1,485,870	1,586,302	1,750,242	1,862,653	1,989,081	2,074,720	2,277,149	2,331,530	2,396,162
Turkmenistan	43,128	53,487	63,677	71,342	76,381	77,736	81,393	86,403	95,622	104,708
Tuvalu	30	33	32	34	35	39	42	45	48	54
Uganda	58,373	64,151	66,870	70,687	76,049	82,899	83,827	91,126	101,321	111,142
Ukraine	494,478	532,161	542,896	552,386	506,022	460,806	476,540	496,522	537,198	604,396
United Arab Emirates	423,127	460,949	491,521	524,473	558,330	603,451	643,652	648,226	723,867	753,928
United Kingdom	2,361,300	2,435,370	2,521,652	2,613,712	2,744,267	2,829,972	2,920,171	3,071,000	3,167,165	3,379,948
United States	15,048,975	15,599,725	16,253,950	16,880,675	17,608,125	18,295,000	18,804,900	19,612,100	20,656,525	21,539,975
Uruguay	58,699	63,002	66,446	70,711	74,272	75,240	77,238	79,990	82,781	87,589
Uzbekistan	137,006	151,199	165,344	181,480	198,883	216,676	233,415	248,763	274,914	293,695
Vanuatu	625	658	677	712	747	780	816	866	908	953
Venezuela	464,719	487,251	517,384	526,599	523,417	507,837	425,622	370,770	298,117	215,183
Vietnam	508,139	551,883	593,103	636,697	689,389	744,402	801,749	872,747	963,333	1,071,756
Palestine	17,517	19,594	21,176	22,548	22,905	23,978	26,351	27,204	28,401	30,494
Yemen					30,988	21,258	20,521	21,723	24,100	25,642
Zambia	38,389	41,363	45,334	48,438	51,594	53,594	56,135	59,154	61,870	62,233
Zimbabwe	36,350	42,402	49,835	51,700	53,888	55,505	56,700	63,379	62,043	75,853

=== 2020s ===
The following list contains the various countries' projected GDP (PPP) from 2020 to 2029. The projections for future years presume that government policies do not change, and assume specific values for oil prices, bond rates, and exchange rates.

IMF estimates (2020s)
Country / territory	2020	2021	2022	2023	2024	2025	2026	2027	2028	2029
Afghanistan	100,898	85,768	86,158	91,415	95,513	99,485				
Albania	41,339	46,071	51,577	55,657	59,382	63,176	67,609	71,981	75,830	79,738
Algeria	558,300	648,896	720,263	777,906	827,351	882,496	947,065	1,008,119	1,060,475	1,114,042
Andorra	4,031	4,650	5,458	5,809	6,187	6,596	6,947	7,287	7,565	7,832
Angola	260,322	301,129	336,249	353,461	380,469	402,720	434,764	463,112	487,938	513,264
Antigua and Barbuda	2,055	2,378	2,764	2,978	3,132	3,312	3,506	3,705	3,876	4,048
Argentina	1,011,999	1,191,725	1,353,704	1,378,464	1,394,435	1,495,304	1,577,460	1,683,427	1,789,772	1,893,951
Armenia	43,553	47,165	56,885	63,943	69,465	76,331	83,239	90,538	97,272	104,031
Aruba	3,120	3,792	4,494	5,106	5,523	6,027	6,458	6,838	7,117	7,352
Australia	1,383,041	1,558,738	1,740,220	1,843,965	1,910,449	1,999,618	2,106,908	2,207,697	2,294,843	2,384,148
Austria	521,842	569,375	642,556	661,406	673,876	697,488	725,583	754,816	779,524	802,200
Azerbaijan	153,048	203,884	228,743	240,533	256,948	267,404	281,143	296,515	310,077	323,725
Bahamas	10,756	12,339	14,963	16,317	17,446	18,586	19,691	20,697	21,505	22,253
Bahrain	78,669	82,672	94,050	101,360	106,969	113,606	104,204	122,466	131,442	137,822
Bangladesh	1,104,316	1,247,561	1,431,553	1,570,999	1,679,286	1,783,639	1,909,362	2,031,954	2,119,887	2,220,995
Barbados	4,660	4,990	6,199	6,548	6,942	7,317	7,699	8,116	8,458	8,791
Belarus	233,301	251,445	257,268	277,928	297,446	309,093	325,565	339,871	350,658	360,432
Belgium	647,546	716,918	799,028	841,928	872,973	904,763	941,290	981,829	1,014,486	1,047,245
Belize	3,767	4,632	5,422	5,653	6,001	6,320	6,657	7,003	7,291	7,578
Benin	42,407	46,468	52,900	58,370	64,326	71,350	78,912	86,930	94,737	103,046
Bhutan	9,884	9,861	11,076	12,056	13,118	14,571	16,111	17,765	19,237	21,022
Bolivia	113,212	133,728	148,647	158,100	160,328	161,945	162,373	164,953	169,190	176,733
Bosnia and Herzegovina	54,010	60,177	67,199	71,109	75,284	79,143	83,688	88,566	93,110	97,725
Botswana	36,107	43,131	48,747	52,197	52,013	53,024	57,197	60,311	63,383	67,123
Brazil	3,359,777	3,787,770	4,180,687	4,478,032	4,749,782	4,986,232	5,266,506	5,533,410	5,784,890	6,039,945
Brunei	31,223	35,347	37,254	39,087	41,712	43,232	45,554	47,607	49,916	51,998
Bulgaria	179,174	203,060	226,446	238,887	253,304	268,022	284,116	300,856	314,920	328,890
Burkina Faso	51,385	54,690	59,548	63,635	68,397	73,938	79,822	86,289	92,293	98,572
Burundi	9,933	10,857	11,845	12,616	13,474	14,414	15,443	16,675	17,677	18,837
Cape Verde	3,536	3,971	4,928	5,358	5,879	6,414	6,961	7,542	8,091	8,662
Cambodia	98,248	103,874	117,416	127,918	139,087	150,385	160,111	171,752	183,585	196,652
Cameroon	114,421	129,022	143,402	153,758	163,255	173,354	184,920	197,579	209,918	222,947
Canada	1,847,839	2,148,927	2,410,494	2,549,714	2,668,533	2,789,540	2,915,715	3,059,620	3,176,984	3,292,284
Central African Republic	8,229	8,887	9,703	10,062	10,725	11,647	12,365	13,176	13,917	14,677
Chad	37,294	43,654	48,955	53,319	57,426	61,958	66,904	72,759	77,700	83,245
Chile	491,181	566,265	619,225	646,791	681,966	717,131	745,751	789,300	825,103	860,462
China	25,777,239	29,438,240	32,522,058	35,555,608	38,289,661	41,260,875	44,554,951	47,798,799	50,739,356	53,598,093
Colombia	785,738	906,033	1,041,871	1,090,034	1,134,649	1,194,444	1,262,046	1,331,434	1,391,600	1,454,896
Comoros	2,603	2,764	3,038	3,246	3,441	3,666	3,899	4,148	4,393	4,638
Democratic Republic of the Congo	104,513	139,045	162,846	183,369	199,452	216,419	235,277	256,489	276,213	296,946
Republic of the Congo	25,583	34,035	36,767	38,668	40,427	42,492	45,476	48,579	51,439	54,484
Costa Rica	111,991	123,332	139,355	151,508	161,733	173,561	185,286	197,763	209,003	220,491
Ivory Coast	160,303	179,178	204,260	225,905	245,638	268,491	294,178	321,944	350,294	381,933
Croatia	123,668	143,189	164,609	177,202	188,697	200,255	211,610	223,289	233,379	243,519
Cyprus	38,673	44,956	52,376	56,307	60,025	63,930	67,972	72,382	76,137	79,923
Czech Republic	479,686	525,243	578,775	600,760	624,241	657,510	692,166	727,354	758,623	788,528
Denmark	365,525	409,688	440,893	462,588	492,741	523,181	560,707	590,124	613,177	634,818
Djibouti	6,108	6,683	7,530	8,344	9,155	9,852	10,754	11,647	12,506	13,432
Dominica	917	1,048	1,185	1,288	1,368	1,467	1,564	1,659	1,740	1,816
Dominican Republic	209,139	245,311	276,596	293,258	315,669	330,838	357,746	385,103	411,288	438,858
Ecuador	202,250	238,845	270,919	286,228	287,852	306,437	325,302	343,927	360,521	377,654
Egypt	1,665,073	1,728,601	1,975,230	2,126,346	2,233,124	2,392,578	2,600,028	2,808,662	3,009,134	3,236,145
El Salvador	58,560	67,623	74,588	79,981	84,158	89,745	96,940	103,990	109,645	115,414
Equatorial Guinea	23,476	29,585	32,720	31,427	32,359	31,269	31,781	32,453	33,655	35,048
Eritrea	6,369									
Estonia	54,074	59,971	64,704	65,162	66,902	69,543	73,391	77,350	80,439	83,400
Eswatini	11,127	12,054	12,965	13,926	14,716	15,839	16,982	18,114	19,124	20,135
Ethiopia	286,176	316,145	360,271	400,583	443,922	497,303	561,348	623,986	689,295	760,310
Fiji	9,805	9,463	11,938	13,598	14,442	15,196	16,005	16,882	17,712	18,599
Finland	294,706	317,782	342,436	350,947	363,513	376,227	395,396	413,411	426,893	440,177
France	3,345,026	3,656,802	4,027,648	4,254,647	4,425,789	4,582,699	4,756,403	4,941,576	5,105,238	5,261,606
Gabon	33,624	44,025	48,602	51,667	54,775	58,034	61,776	65,591	68,810	72,124
Gambia	6,367	7,156	8,088	8,887	9,659	10,482	11,387	12,349	13,249	14,176
Georgia	62,509	70,151	83,398	93,301	104,954	115,754	128,236	139,817	149,845	160,325
Germany	4,920,052	5,289,378	5,772,989	5,928,497	6,080,786	6,255,150	6,550,995	6,830,629	7,045,214	7,242,945
Ghana	192,835	214,867	239,000	255,715	277,601	301,874	329,911	358,087	383,643	410,626
Greece	315,963	354,887	401,227	425,161	445,150	466,339	490,550	515,032	534,692	553,764
Grenada	1,671	1,784	2,052	2,225	2,355	2,534	2,721	2,890	3,034	3,176
Guatemala	190,017	208,107	232,232	249,430	265,325	283,964	305,119	326,723	346,623	366,909
Guinea	74,182	78,952	88,423	97,789	106,781	117,115	129,755	144,217	162,027	181,984
Guinea-Bissau	4,201	4,686	5,251	5,731	6,160	6,689	7,239	7,833	8,355	8,896
Guyana	13,581	18,647	32,632	45,296	66,814	81,813	103,446	124,615	138,948	147,664
Haiti	34,892	35,773	37,683	38,367	37,703	37,646	38,251	39,258	40,351	41,487
Honduras	54,491	63,828	71,220	76,532	81,344	86,617	92,486	98,640	104,809	110,858
Hong Kong	435,301	488,412	504,005	539,375	567,791	603,758	647,727	686,933	713,766	741,403
Hungary	344,108	377,684	421,503	433,833	447,941	461,997	486,618	512,221	534,844	558,626
Iceland	20,830	23,475	27,379	29,884	30,374	31,512	33,036	34,700	36,175	37,741
India	9,558,908	11,109,772	12,808,899	14,262,514	15,680,146	17,351,185	19,192,617	21,185,319	23,125,324	25,181,096
Indonesia	3,223,405	3,530,623	3,983,511	4,341,525	4,676,817	5,045,114	5,483,042	5,944,261	6,382,084	6,842,429
Iran	1,326,318	1,405,065	1,570,931	1,716,738	1,825,208	1,856,013	1,772,668	1,894,274	1,962,136	2,036,232
Iraq	448,956	551,148	636,051	665,230	683,753	698,844	606,636	744,528	810,210	853,636
Ireland	490,944	593,441	687,690	689,890	733,189	812,466	831,069	888,726	933,550	973,818
Israel	375,928	430,115	489,159	517,898	540,252	573,803	619,724	667,503	705,966	745,042
Italy	2,641,205	2,984,161	3,351,411	3,509,149	3,627,214	3,742,786	3,898,990	4,046,754	4,160,985	4,267,500
Jamaica	27,640	29,599	33,755	35,982	36,706	37,703	38,991	41,172	42,802	44,312
Japan	5,499,930	5,812,995	6,305,423	6,600,435	6,773,954	7,032,894	7,324,055	7,605,148	7,809,035	8,004,105
Jordan	114,158	111,289	122,512	131,083	137,877	145,506	154,467	164,344	172,832	181,416
Kazakhstan	565,757	650,470	719,223	784,244	844,549	923,121	996,311	1,077,835	1,138,971	1,204,433
Kenya	250,255	284,129	319,214	350,126	375,829	403,591	436,129	470,793	504,209	539,225
Kiribati	309	350	394	422	453	485	517	546	569	592
South Korea	2,481,996	2,688,008	2,963,732	3,120,435	3,270,551	3,394,879	3,625,973	3,845,924	4,014,026	4,177,745
Kosovo	20,197	23,382	26,123	28,205	30,251	32,162	34,408	36,768	39,030	41,362
Kuwait	182,443	220,886	252,663	257,832	260,538	274,702	236,414	285,613	325,066	338,949
Kyrgyzstan	34,834	39,302	45,885	51,896	59,367	67,691	76,238	84,173	92,386	100,295
Laos	56,769	59,620	65,317	70,244	81,792	88,005	95,090	102,517	108,837	114,824
Latvia	62,223	67,094	73,257	75,288	77,188	80,913	85,532	89,814	93,630	97,338
Lebanon	72,253	60,030	65,234	67,371	65,529	69,944				
Lesotho	5,795	5,858	6,380	6,784	7,299	7,603	7,945	8,260	8,549	8,842
Liberia	8,168	8,084	9,078	9,850	10,508	11,339	12,371	13,407	14,406	15,466
Libya	77,181	90,199	88,305	101,212	108,153	128,618	137,324	145,789	152,815	159,647
Liechtenstein	5,444	6,910	7,045	7,560	7,731	7,935	8,284	8,630	8,914	9,220
Lithuania	115,935	130,492	143,228	149,825	158,246	167,155	177,443	186,849	195,618	204,373
Luxembourg	76,953	89,123	94,440	98,078	100,951	104,270	108,959	114,188	119,008	123,821
Macau	39,121	50,078	43,483	79,088	87,480	93,977	100,333	106,671	112,234	117,802
Madagascar	43,150	46,836	52,257	56,510	60,462	63,987	68,658	74,015	79,042	84,352
Malawi	29,543	33,832	36,582	38,692	40,347	42,439	45,014	47,483	49,684	51,982
Malaysia	931,107	1,022,399	1,194,345	1,283,469	1,384,307	1,493,924	1,624,495	1,752,694	1,865,885	1,983,076
Maldives	6,741	9,834	11,993	13,078	13,860	15,123	15,786	16,904	17,920	18,991
Mali	59,279	62,738	69,707	75,766	81,592	87,843	95,793	104,439	112,463	120,616
Malta	25,760	30,236	33,710	37,456	40,447	43,463	46,813	50,217	53,307	56,492
Marshall Islands	227	243	258	254	267	279	297	313	325	337
Mauritania	26,408	27,635	31,621	35,041	38,067	40,467	43,660	47,030	50,796	54,316
Mauritius	26,999	28,793	33,423	36,306	39,079	41,371	43,920	46,731	49,270	51,859
Mexico	2,454,085	2,684,659	2,983,083	3,191,567	3,321,105	3,425,471	3,594,397	3,772,407	3,933,403	4,094,247
Federated States of Micronesia	361	389	404	423	447	468	491	515	535	551
Moldova	35,647	40,708	41,608	43,686	44,940	47,237	49,567	52,312	55,104	58,104
Mongolia	45,560	50,053	56,326	62,776	67,681	74,217	81,470	88,953	95,879	102,685
Montenegro	12,923	15,080	17,407	19,230	20,347	21,446	22,833	24,211	25,453	26,716
Morocco	286,109	323,485	352,868	379,973	406,708	437,695	472,789	508,109	541,379	575,996
Mozambique	43,455	46,206	51,666	56,541	59,248	60,705	63,380	66,656	69,774	73,290
Myanmar	296,099	231,784	258,362	270,618	274,852	276,412	291,559	306,876	318,118	328,071
Namibia	25,525	27,288	30,815	33,353	35,500	37,065	39,091	41,397	43,506	45,718
Nauru	105	118	127	131	136	143	151	159	165	172
Nepal	122,690	134,000	151,654	160,460	170,622	182,873	195,832	209,564	226,183	242,289
Netherlands	1,091,779	1,215,449	1,367,453	1,410,202	1,461,778	1,523,729	1,599,125	1,671,181	1,729,298	1,784,830
New Zealand	227,883	242,269	266,497	282,592	288,942	297,423	313,675	331,817	347,817	363,413
Nicaragua	41,191	47,305	52,483	56,861	60,406	65,048	69,819	74,753	78,993	83,335
Niger	35,500	38,850	46,562	49,530	55,026	60,368	66,767	73,376	79,396	85,758
Nigeria	1,586,734	1,658,305	1,853,462	1,986,716	2,120,557	2,263,725	2,438,180	2,623,638	2,788,583	2,961,878
North Macedonia	37,052	41,101	45,251	48,147	50,876	54,018	57,790	61,516	64,672	67,877
Norway	375,376	499,939	557,497	580,439	603,782	626,231	657,258	686,984	709,130	730,801
Oman	159,024	174,254	201,607	212,119	221,107	232,365	250,086	263,671	275,840	289,214
Pakistan	1,186,294	1,285,343	1,462,238	1,513,840	1,593,323	1,687,288	1,806,861	1,928,951	2,053,526	2,186,688
Palau	263	242	258	271	311	338	365	386	404	421
Panama	115,991	134,415	159,912	177,796	187,362	200,659	217,782	234,070	249,903	266,755
Papua New Guinea	33,290	34,623	39,212	42,233	44,999	49,053	52,269	56,072	59,203	62,197
Paraguay	94,492	102,943	110,263	120,444	129,297	141,515	152,860	163,977	173,730	183,756
Peru	430,183	514,697	566,994	586,188	622,336	660,631	703,327	746,252	786,174	825,137
Philippines	923,367	1,001,825	1,154,739	1,264,152	1,370,626	1,468,635	1,569,841	1,701,071	1,831,147	1,974,839
Poland	1,391,432	1,544,889	1,742,845	1,812,994	1,919,118	2,041,660	2,181,830	2,307,529	2,413,141	2,520,226
Portugal	370,353	402,683	461,578	493,729	517,590	541,103	570,956	600,005	623,689	646,337
Puerto Rico	120,955	132,334	145,977	152,558	161,436	166,213	171,634	178,805	183,600	188,584
Qatar	229,537	292,655	326,773	344,057	363,278	379,583	331,217	405,715	460,281	494,686
Romania	658,755	724,206	808,416	857,662	887,688	917,231	942,929	994,360	1,040,154	1,089,386
Russia	4,651,430	5,688,268	6,007,002	6,485,661	6,979,167	7,234,599	7,542,897	7,852,113	8,094,734	8,330,942
Rwanda	30,774	37,080	43,625	49,135	54,025	60,644	67,324	74,466	81,296	88,633
Samoa	1,195	1,186	1,299	1,553	1,669	1,785	1,853	1,943	2,027	2,116
San Marino	1,920	2,218	2,561	2,668	2,763	2,879	3,014	3,140	3,242	3,346
São Tomé and Príncipe	1,119	1,272	1,366	1,422	1,480	1,535	1,593	1,674	1,753	1,835
Saudi Arabia	1,498,062	1,929,888	2,315,843	2,415,707	2,543,213	2,730,087	2,728,584	3,037,686	3,249,811	3,424,714
Senegal	63,009	71,874	79,972	86,503	94,452	103,416				
Serbia	144,972	161,766	178,004	191,599	204,269	213,903	228,475	245,042	258,911	273,133
Seychelles	3,058	2,976	3,503	3,823	4,052	4,399	4,593	4,928	5,188	5,451
Sierra Leone	21,516	23,065	26,025	28,542	30,627	32,927	35,399	38,135	40,726	43,395
Singapore	580,620	730,724	814,304	857,087	926,012	998,154	1,082,946	1,150,943	1,204,316	1,258,188
Slovakia	192,849	209,238	225,401	238,792	249,657	258,298	269,179	282,203	295,417	308,462
Slovenia	87,812	97,568	107,281	114,229	119,539	124,581	132,894	140,092	145,993	151,890
Solomon Islands	1,601	1,670	1,743	1,860	1,964	2,089	2,218	2,353	2,470	2,589
Somalia	24,431	24,268	26,726	28,892	30,828	32,608	34,464	36,519	38,468	40,609
South Africa	767,391	841,476	920,123	962,316	992,244	1,029,715	1,075,434	1,123,977	1,164,367	1,206,469
South Sudan	8,622	14,500	14,730	16,087	11,867	17,226	19,674	21,077	22,263	23,438
Spain	1,862,545	2,090,614	2,382,599	2,530,264	2,690,365	2,832,758	3,001,678	3,151,773	3,274,844	3,393,739
Sri Lanka	283,652	317,188	314,864	320,041	344,626	371,218	398,953	426,697	450,584	475,239
Saint Kitts and Nevis	1,256	1,236	1,463	1,588	1,657	1,726	1,816	1,916	2,003	2,095
Saint Lucia	2,698	3,417	4,369	4,710	5,061	5,165	5,403	5,673	5,885	6,092
Saint Vincent and the Grenadines	1,586	1,666	1,874	2,032	2,178	2,289	2,421	2,557	2,680	2,805
Sudan	197,404	171,048	178,681	141,816	117,377	120,467	133,237	158,044	177,446	195,281
Suriname	10,377	11,405	12,514	13,297	13,780	14,710	15,808	16,980	22,215	32,380
Sweden	594,249	651,825	707,141	732,157	765,855	796,995	844,411	890,144	927,350	962,606
Switzerland	642,295	733,644	814,169	853,588	888,667	926,796	975,753	1,018,620	1,059,451	1,092,849
Syria	136,379									
Taiwan	1,366,457	1,512,429	1,663,920	1,745,035	1,883,999	2,102,892	2,406,687	2,589,206	2,728,504	2,852,929
Tajikistan	35,624	39,727	45,969	51,628	57,406	63,867	70,835	78,033	84,585	91,363
Tanzania	186,620	204,686	229,534	250,404	270,849	294,436	322,693	352,546	381,470	411,980
Thailand	1,372,406	1,451,544	1,597,006	1,694,033	1,788,596	1,879,874	1,983,943	2,089,348	2,181,531	2,277,787
Timor-Leste	8,131	9,215	7,847	6,664	6,213	7,129	7,548	8,074	8,542	9,004
Togo	20,669	23,428	26,681	29,397	32,056	34,972	37,956	41,226	44,393	47,724
Tonga	626	648	679	729	758	812	855	898	932	965
Trinidad and Tobago	36,495	41,674	45,145	47,514	49,994	51,058	52,888	55,769	58,703	61,476
Tunisia	142,710	149,106	164,026	170,742	178,177	187,865	198,912	209,352	216,899	224,320
Turkey	2,435,610	2,727,394	3,081,165	3,357,963	3,563,676	3,794,185	4,025,804	4,301,066	4,564,899	4,838,563
Turkmenistan	104,049	115,316	127,686	138,113	146,491	155,724	164,780	174,203	182,317	190,561
Tuvalu	56	59	54	55	61	66	71	75	78	82
Uganda	113,782	127,645	145,207	158,197	171,994	188,338	206,676	234,200	255,990	277,240
Ukraine	656,106	746,471	569,773	623,853	660,615	690,355	720,723	769,422	818,326	866,390
United Arab Emirates	627,902	656,665	756,428	818,544	894,591	975,380	968,842	1,075,837	1,174,765	1,268,134
United Kingdom	3,262,290	3,617,402	4,070,327	4,241,668	4,398,775	4,569,342	4,783,102	4,993,908	5,176,361	5,351,289
United States	21,375,275	23,745,850	26,059,725	27,825,875	29,381,025	30,861,300	32,642,373	34,441,607	35,877,138	37,245,980
Uruguay	87,439	99,971	112,044	117,130	124,126	129,667	135,773	143,407	149,595	155,790
Uzbekistan	299,601	332,356	377,761	416,679	455,882	503,908	561,582	617,058	667,657	719,958
Vanuatu	911	941	1,065	1,169	1,244	1,323	1,416	1,507	1,581	1,652
Venezuela	145,667	153,968	189,878	208,206	232,505	260,133	282,366	311,776		
Vietnam	1,138,632	1,192,059	1,386,227	1,511,045	1,657,482	1,837,522	2,058,905	2,282,972	2,467,693	2,662,915
Palestine	28,610	27,878	31,088	31,940	25,271	27,063				
Yemen	26,054	28,874	30,789	28,974	29,282	29,890	30,433	31,390	32,360	33,469
Zambia	60,176	68,672	77,410	84,624	90,107	95,954	104,733	113,355	121,514	130,346
Zimbabwe	81,074	96,802	109,614	119,729	124,935	138,849	150,672	160,853	172,338	182,990

=== 2030s ===
The following list contains the various countries' projected GDP (PPP) from 2030 to 2031. The projections for future years presume that government policies do not change, and assume specific values for oil prices, bond rates, and exchange rates.

IMF estimates (2030s)
Country / territory	2030	2031
Afghanistan		99,485
Albania	83,831	88,049
Algeria	1,168,516	1,224,110
Andorra	8,097	8,361
Angola	539,922	567,147
Antigua and Barbuda	4,227	4,408
Argentina	1,993,443	2,088,910
Armenia	111,213	118,740
Aruba	7,578	7,803
Australia	2,479,265	2,577,180
Austria	823,712	844,516
Azerbaijan	337,950	352,435
Bahamas	23,008	23,756
Bahrain	144,528	151,611
Bangladesh	2,329,066	2,439,730
Barbados	9,134	9,477
Belarus	369,985	379,219
Belgium	1,080,800	1,113,468
Belize	7,874	8,170
Benin	112,020	121,589
Bhutan	22,803	24,477
Bolivia	185,239	193,545
Bosnia and Herzegovina	102,531	107,431
Botswana	71,071	75,158
Brazil	6,306,412	6,575,931
Brunei	56,457	59,790
Bulgaria	343,280	357,735
Burkina Faso	105,264	112,287
Burundi	19,953	21,205
Cape Verde	9,272	9,909
Cambodia	210,896	226,315
Cameroon	236,862	251,531
Canada	3,409,072	3,530,030
Central African Republic	15,474	16,292
Chad	89,377	95,754
Chile	896,725	933,261
China	56,423,955	59,287,314
Colombia	1,523,185	1,594,741
Comoros	4,895	5,158
Democratic Republic of the Congo	319,010	342,236
Republic of the Congo	57,712	61,042
Costa Rica	232,390	244,607
Ivory Coast	415,499	450,150
Croatia	254,006	264,595
Cyprus	83,866	87,890
Czech Republic	818,445	847,559
Denmark	656,597	677,791
Djibouti	14,434	15,491
Dominica	1,889	1,960
Dominican Republic	468,568	500,337
Ecuador	396,227	415,163
Egypt	3,456,068	3,684,370
El Salvador	121,442	127,617
Equatorial Guinea	36,593	38,081
Eritrea	6,369	
Estonia	86,359	89,309
Eswatini	21,188	22,260
Ethiopia	836,373	916,081
Fiji	19,555	20,572
Finland	453,730	467,009
France	5,419,032	5,572,736
Gabon	75,602	79,138
Gambia	15,162	16,195
Georgia	171,476	183,160
Germany	7,426,096	7,600,337
Ghana	439,043	468,855
Greece	573,236	592,591
Grenada	3,324	3,474
Guatemala	388,242	410,431
Guinea	203,540	225,515
Guinea-Bissau	9,443	10,011
Guyana	154,025	159,015
Haiti	42,766	44,158
Honduras	117,213	123,769
Hong Kong	771,924	802,487
Hungary	583,253	608,161
Iceland	39,377	41,026
India	27,399,440	29,772,046
Indonesia	7,335,028	7,853,300
Iran	2,116,618	2,197,259
Iraq	899,115	946,341
Ireland	1,014,528	1,055,706
Israel	785,868	827,812
Italy	4,374,898	4,478,728
Jamaica	45,859	47,398
Japan	8,200,580	8,391,951
Jordan	190,423	199,605
Kazakhstan	1,272,507	1,341,131
Kenya	576,564	615,781
Kiribati	616	640
South Korea	4,336,556	4,494,712
Kosovo	43,818	46,340
Kuwait	353,070	367,197
Kyrgyzstan	107,762	115,485
Laos	120,518	126,303
Latvia	101,135	104,944
Lebanon	69,944	
Lesotho	9,142	9,439
Liberia	16,632	17,833
Libya	166,365	172,876
Liechtenstein	9,532	9,842
Lithuania	213,269	222,103
Luxembourg	128,668	133,495
Macau	123,607	129,534
Madagascar	90,075	96,068
Malawi	54,539	57,145
Malaysia	2,106,861	2,235,413
Maldives	20,118	21,291
Mali	129,312	138,451
Malta	59,845	63,314
Marshall Islands	349	361
Mauritania	57,040	59,789
Mauritius	54,567	57,343
Mexico	4,257,736	4,421,902
Federated States of Micronesia	566	580
Moldova	61,228	64,434
Mongolia	109,837	117,339
Montenegro	28,027	29,366
Morocco	611,015	646,659
Mozambique	81,980	94,327
Myanmar	337,023	345,763
Namibia	47,976	50,286
Nauru	178	185
Nepal	259,217	276,942
Netherlands	1,839,978	1,894,036
New Zealand	378,889	394,711
Nicaragua	87,883	92,557
Niger	92,614	99,867
Nigeria	3,143,310	3,331,295
North Macedonia	71,215	74,619
Norway	752,890	774,654
Oman	303,377	316,625
Pakistan	2,327,635	2,474,394
Palau	437	454
Panama	284,221	302,257
Papua New Guinea	65,319	68,508
Paraguay	194,291	205,157
Peru	865,715	907,089
Philippines	2,129,281	2,291,258
Poland	2,630,712	2,742,389
Portugal	669,235	691,687
Puerto Rico	193,632	198,552
Qatar	530,299	557,356
Romania	1,141,487	1,195,805
Russia	8,570,923	8,806,162
Rwanda	96,612	105,242
Samoa	2,209	2,302
San Marino	3,452	3,556
São Tomé and Príncipe	1,921	2,008
Saudi Arabia	3,610,767	3,805,903
Senegal	103,416	
Serbia	287,974	303,337
Seychelles	5,728	6,013
Sierra Leone	46,234	49,195
Singapore	1,313,909	1,370,022
Slovakia	321,087	332,512
Slovenia	157,967	164,071
Solomon Islands	2,715	2,844
Somalia	42,937	45,426
South Africa	1,251,563	1,296,011
South Sudan	24,740	25,900
Spain	3,515,749	3,637,382
Sri Lanka	501,057	527,580
Saint Kitts and Nevis	2,187	2,279
Saint Lucia	6,299	6,504
Saint Vincent and the Grenadines	2,934	3,065
Sudan	214,830	236,025
Suriname	34,023	35,634
Sweden	998,002	1,033,465
Switzerland	1,133,625	1,167,276
Syria	136,379	
Taiwan	2,985,014	3,095,082
Tajikistan	98,183	105,372
Tanzania	444,269	479,034
Thailand	2,378,266	2,479,911
Timor-Leste	9,475	9,947
Togo	51,286	55,042
Tonga	998	1,031
Trinidad and Tobago	63,844	66,157
Tunisia	231,908	239,420
Turkey	5,127,025	5,424,686
Turkmenistan	199,107	207,904
Tuvalu	85	87
Uganda	299,426	322,077
Ukraine	915,173	964,496
United Arab Emirates	1,339,271	1,410,481
United Kingdom	5,527,491	5,703,175
United States	38,604,620	39,960,668
Uruguay	162,182	168,613
Uzbekistan	775,248	833,589
Vanuatu	1,725	1,798
Venezuela	311,776	
Vietnam	2,867,110	3,082,883
Palestine	27,063	
Yemen	34,774	36,260
Zambia	139,808	149,729
Zimbabwe	194,226	205,896

== GDP (PPP) milestones by countries ==
The following is a list of countries reaching a certain threshold of GDP (PPP) in a specific year according to International Monetary Fund. As for the Soviet Union, its GDP (PPP) reached US$2.66 trillion in 1990, but it is unknown in which year did its economy surpass the 1 trillion and 2 trillion hallmark.

=== 1–6 trillion ===
1 trillion USD		2 trillion USD		3 trillion USD		5 trillion USD		6 trillion USD	
Year	Country	Year	Country	Year	Country	Year	Country	Year	Country
1969	United States	1977	United States	1981	United States	1988	United States	1991	United States
bef 1990	Soviet Union	bef 1990	Soviet Union	1996	Japan	2004	China	2006	China
1980	Japan	1988	Japan	1999	China	2011	India	2014	India
1981	West Germany	1993	Germany	2005	India	2015	Japan	2022	Japan
1987	Italy	1995	China	2005	Germany	2021	Russia	2022	Russia
1989	France	2001	India	2008	Russia	2021	Germany	2024	Germany
1989	United Kingdom	2004	Russia	2014	Brazil	2025	Indonesia	2028	Indonesia*
1991	China	2004	Italy	2017	United Kingdom	2026	Brazil*	2029	Brazil*
N/A	Russia	2004	France	2018	France	2028	United Kingdom*		
1992	India	2005	United Kingdom	2018	Indonesia	2028	France*		
1993	Brazil	2006	Brazil	2022	Italy	2030	Turkey*		
1994	Mexico	2011	Mexico	2022	Turkey				
2000	Spain	2012	Indonesia	2023	Mexico				
2002	Canada	2015	South Korea	2023	South Korea				
2003	Indonesia	2016	Turkey	2026	Spain*				
2003	South Korea	2019	Spain	2027	Canada*				
2005	Turkey	2021	Canada	2027	Saudi Arabia*				
2008	Saudi Arabia	2022	Saudi Arabia	2028	Egypt*				
2010	Iran	2023	Egypt	2030	Nigeria*				
2010	Nigeria	2024	Nigeria	2031	Taiwan*				
2012	Thailand	2025	Taiwan	2031	Vietnam*				
2012	Australia	2025	Poland						
2014	Taiwan	2026	Australia*						
2015	Egypt	2026	Vietnam*						
2015	Poland	2027	Thailand*						
2015	Argentina	2027	Bangladesh*						
2016	Pakistan	2028	Pakistan*						
2018	Netherlands	2029	Iran*						
2019	Vietnam	2030	Philippines*						
2020	Bangladesh	2030	Malaysia*						
2021	Malaysia	2031	Argentina*						
2021	Philippines								
2022	Colombia								
2025	South Africa								
2026	Singapore*								
2027	Kazakhstan*								
2027	Switzerland*								
2027	United Arab Emirates*								
2027	Algeria*								
2028	Romania*								
2028	Belgium*								
2030	Ireland*								
2031	Sweden*								

* Future predictions are marked with an asterisk.

=== 10–50 trillion ===
10 trillion USD		20 trillion USD		30 trillion USD		40 trillion USD		50 trillion USD	
Year	Country	Year	Country	Year	Country	Year	Country	Year	Country
2000	United States	2017	China	2022	China	2025	China	2028	China*
2009	China	2018	United States	2025	United States				
2021	India	2027	India*						

== See also ==
- List of countries by GDP (nominal)
- List of countries by GDP (nominal) per capita
- List of countries by past and projected GDP (nominal)
- List of countries by past and projected GDP (nominal) per capita
- List of countries by GDP (PPP)
- List of countries by GDP (PPP) per capita
- List of countries by past and projected GDP (PPP) per capita
